= List of Allium species =

Allium is a genus with around 1000 species, making it one of the largest plant genera in the world.

The number of accepted species in the genus Allium varies depending on the source, but as of November 2024, World Flora Online accepts 969 species, while Plants of the World Online accepts 1077 species:

== A ==
- Allium aaseae Ownbey – South Idaho onion
- Allium abanticum Brullo & Salmeri
- Allium abbasii R.M.Fritsch
- Allium abramsii (Ownbey & Aase ex Traub) McNeal – Abrams' allium
- Allium acidoides Stearn
- Allium aciphyllum J.M.Xu
- Allium acuminatum Hook. – tapertip onion
- Allium acutiflorum Loisel.
- Allium adenanthum Brullo & Salmeri
- Allium adiyamanense Yıld. & Kılıç
- Allium aegilicum Tzanoud.
- Allium aeginiense Brullo, Giusso & Terrasi
- Allium aetnense Brullo, Pavone & Salmeri
- Allium affine Ledeb.
- Allium afghanicum Wendelbo
- Allium aflatunense B.Fedtsch.
- Allium × agarmyschicum N.Friesen & Seregin
- Allium agrigentinum Brullo & Pavone
- Allium akaka S.G.Gmel. ex Schult. & Schult.f.
- Allium akirense N.Friesen & Fragman
- Allium aksekiense Özhatay, Koyuncu & E.Kaya
- Allium aktauense F.O.Khass. & Esankulov
- Allium alabasicum Y.Z.Zhao
- Allium aladaghense Memariani & Joharchi
- Allium alaicum Vved.
- Allium alamutense Razyfard, Zarre & R.M.Fritsch
- Allium alaschanicum Y.Z.Zhao
- Allium albanicum Brullo, C.Brullo, Cambria, Giusso & Salmeri
- Allium albiflorum Omelczuk
- Allium albotunicatum O.Schwarz
- Allium albovianum Vved.
- Allium alekii R.M.Fritsch & M.V.Agab.
- Allium alexandrae Vved.
- Allium alexeianum Regel
- Allium alibile A.Rich.
- Allium alpinarii Özhatay & Kollmann
- Allium altaicum Pall.
- Allium altissimum Regel
- Allium altoatlanticum Seregin
- Allium altyncolicum N.Friesen
- Allium amethystinum Tausch
- Allium ampeloprasum L. – Broadleaf wild leek
- Allium amphibolum Ledeb.
- Allium amplectens Torr. – Narrowleaf onion
- Allium anacoleum Hand.-Mazz.
- Allium anatolicum Özhatay & B.Mathew
- Allium anceps Kellogg – twinleaf onion
- Allium angulosum L. – Mouse garlic
- Allium anisopodium Ledeb. – thread-leaf chive
- Allium anisotepalum Vved.
- Allium ankarense Yıld.
- Allium antalyense Eren, Çinbilgel & Parolly
- Allium antiatlanticum Emb. & Maire
- Allium anzalonei Brullo, Pavone & Salmeri
- Allium apergii Trigas, Iatroú & Tzanoud.
- Allium apolloniense Biel, Kit Tan & Tzanoud.
- Allium apulum Brullo, Guglielmo, Pavone & Salmeri
- Allium arampatzisii Ioannidis & Tzanoud.
- Allium archeotrichon Brullo, Pavone & Salmeri
- Allium arkitense R.M.Fritsch
- Allium arlgirdense Blakelock
- Allium armenum Boiss. & Kotschy
- Allium armerioides Boiss.
- Allium aroides Popov & Vved.
- Allium arsuzense Eker & Koyuncu
- Allium artemisietorum Eig & Feinbrun
- Allium asarense R.M.Fritsch & Matin
- Allium ascalonicum L. – shallot
- Allium aschersonianum Barbey
- Allium asclepiadeum Bornm.
- Allium asirense B.Mathew
- Allium asperiflorum Miscz. ex Grossh.
- Allium assadii Seisums
- Allium atropurpureum Waldst. & Kit. – purple-flowered onion
- Allium atrorubens S.Watson – dark red onion
- Allium atrosanguineum Schrenk
- Allium atroviolaceum Boiss.
- Allium aucheri Boiss.
- Allium auriculatum Kunth
- Allium austrodanubiense N.Friesen & Seregin
- Allium austroiranicum R.M.Fritsch
- Allium austrokyushuense M.Hotta
- Allium austrosibiricum N.Friesen
- Allium autumnale P.H.Davis
- Allium autumniflorum F.O.Khass. & Akhani
- Allium aybukeae H.Duman & Eksi
- Allium ayhan-toprakii Yıldırım
- Allium azaurenum Gomb.
- Allium aznavense R.M.Fritsch
- Allium azutavicum Kotukhov

== B ==
- Allium backhousianum Regel
- Allium baekdusanense Y.N.Lee
- Allium baeticum Boiss.
- Allium bajtulinii Bajtenov & I.I.Kamenetskaya
- Allium bakhtiaricum Regel
- Allium balansae Boiss.
- Allium balcanicum Brullo, Pavone & Salmeri
- Allium balkhanicum (R.M.Fritsch & F.O.Khass.) R.M.Fritsch
- Allium baluchistanicum Wendelbo
- Allium barsczewskii Lipsky
- Allium barthianum Asch. & Schweinf.
- Allium basalticum Fragman & R.M.Fritsch
- Allium bassitense J.Thiébaut
- Allium baytopiorum Kollmann & Özhatay – Baytop's onion
- Allium beesianum W.W.Sm.
- Allium bekeczalicum Lazkov
- Allium bellulum Prokh.
- Allium beypazariense Koçyiğit, Özhatay & E.Kaya
- Allium bidentatum Fisch. ex Prokh. & Ikonn.-Gal.
- Allium bigelovii (also A. bigelowii) S.Watson
- Allium bilgeae Yıld.
- Allium bilgilii H.Duman & Eksi
- Allium bingoelense Yıld. & Kılıç
- Allium birkinshawii Mouterde
- Allium bisceptrum S.Watson – twincrest onion, Aspen onion
- Allium bisotunense R.M.Fritsch
- Allium blandum Wall.
- Allium blomfieldianum Asch. & Schweinf.
- Allium boissieri Regel
- Allium bolanderi S.Watson – Bolander's onion
- Allium bornmuelleri Hayek
- Allium borszczowii Regel
- Allium botschantzevii Kamelin
- Allium bourgeaui Rech.f.
- Allium brachyodon Boiss.
- Allium brachyscapum Vved.
- Allium brachyspathum Brullo, Pavone & Salmeri
- Allium bracteolatum Wendelbo
- Allium brandegeei S.Watson – Brandegee's onion
- Allium brevicaule Boiss. & Balansa
- Allium brevidens Vved.
- Allium brevidentatum F.Z.Li
- Allium brevidentiforme Vved.
- Allium brevipes Ledeb.
- Allium breviscapum Stapf
- Allium brevistylum S.Watson – shortstyle onion
- Allium brulloi Salmeri
- Allium brussalisii Tzanoud. & Kypr.
- Allium bucharicum Regel
- Allium bungei Boiss.
- Allium burdickii (Hanes) A.G.Jones
- Allium burjaticum N.Friesen
- Allium burlewii Davidson – Burlew's onion

== C ==
- Allium caeruleum Pall.
- Allium caesioides Wendelbo
- Allium caesium Schrenk
- Allium caespitosum Siev. ex Bong. & C.A. Mey.
- Allium calabrum (N.Terracc.) Brullo, Pavone & Salmeri
- Allium calamarophilon Phitos & Tzanoud.
- Allium callidyction C.A.Mey. ex Kunth
- Allium callimischon Link
- Allium calocephalum Wendelbo
- Allium calyptratum Boiss.
- Allium campanulatum S.Watson – dusky onion
- Allium canadense L. – meadow garlic, wild garlic
- Allium canariense (Regel) N.Friesen & P.Schönfelder
- Allium candargyi Karavok. & Tzanoud.
- Allium candolleanum Albov
- Allium capitellatum Boiss.
- Allium cappadocicum Boiss. & Balansa
- Allium caput-medusae Airy Shaw
- Allium cardiostemon Fisch. & C.A.Mey.
- Allium carinatum L. – keeled garlic
- Allium carium Brullo & Salmeri
- Allium carmeli Boiss.
- Allium caroli-henrici Wendelbo
- Allium carolinianum Redouté
- Allium caspium (Pall.) M.Bieb.
- Allium cassium Boiss.
- Allium castellanense (Garbari, Miceli & Raimondo) Brullo, Guglielmo, Pavone & Salmeri
- Allium cathodicarpum Wendelbo
- Allium cepa L. – garden onion
- Allium cephalonicum Brullo, Pavone & Salmeri
- Allium cernuum Roth – nodding onion, wild onion, lady's leek
- Allium chalcophengos Airy Shaw
- Allium chalkii Tzanoud. & Kollmann
- Allium chamaemoly L.
- Allium chamaespathum Boiss.
- Allium chamarense M.M.Ivanova
- Allium changduense J.M.Xu
- Allium chienchuanense J.M.Xu
- Allium chinense G.Don – rakkyo
- Allium chitralicum F.T.Wang & Tang
- Allium chiwui F.T.Wang & Tang
- Allium chloranthum Boiss.
- Allium chloroneurum Boiss.
- Allium chlorotepalum R.M.Fritsch & M.Jaeger
- Allium chodsha-bakirganicum Gaffarov & Turak.
- Allium choriotepalum Wendelbo
- Allium chorkessaricum F.O.Khass. & Tojibaev
- Allium chrysantherum Boiss. & Reut.
- Allium chrysanthum Regel
- Allium chrysocephalum Regel
- Allium chychkanense R.M.Fritsch
- Allium circassicum Kolak.
- Allium circinatum Sieber
- Allium circumflexum Wendelbo
- Allium cirrhosum Vand.
- Allium cisferganense R.M.Fritsch
- Allium cithaeronis Bogdanovic, C.Brullo, Brullo, Giusso, Musarella & Salmeri
- Allium clathratum Ledeb.
- Allium clausum Vved.
- Allium clivorum R.M.Fritsch
- Allium colchicifolium Boiss.
- Allium columbianum (Ownbey & Mingrone) P.M.Peterson, Annable & Rieseberg – Columbian onion
- Allium commutatum Guss.
- Allium compactatum Brullo & Salmeri
- Allium condensatum Turcz. – Oriental yellow chive
- Allium confragosum Vved.
- Allium consanguineum Kunth
- Allium constrictum (Ownbey & Mingrone) P.M.Peterson, Annable & Rieseberg – Grand Coulee onion
- Allium convallarioides Grossh.
- Allium corsicum Jauzein, J.-M.Tison, Deschâtres & H.Couderc
- Allium coryi M.E.Jones – yellowflower onion
- Allium costatovaginatum Kamelin & Levichev
- Allium crameri Asch. & Boiss.
- Allium cratericola Eastw. – cascade onion
- Allium cremnophilum Brullo, Pavone & Salmeri
- Allium crenulatum Wiegand
- Allium cretaceum N.Friesen & Seregin
- Allium crispum Greene – crinkled onion
- Allium cristophii Trautv.
- Allium croaticum Bogdanovic
- Allium crystallinum Vved.
- Allium cucullatum Wendelbo
- Allium cupani Raf.
- Allium cupuliferum Regel
- Allium curtum Boiss. & Gaill.
- Allium cuthbertii Small – striped garlic
- Allium cyaneum Regel
- Allium cyathophorum Bureau & Franch.
- Allium cylleneum Brullo, Pavone & Salmeri
- Allium cyprium Brullo, Pavone & Salmeri
- Allium cyrilli Ten.
- Allium czelghauricum Bordz. – Czelghaurian onion
- Allium czemalense (N.Friesen) N.Friesen

== D ==
- Allium daghestanicum Grossh.
- Allium damascenum Feinbrun
- Allium daninianum Brullo, Pavone & Salmeri
- Allium darwasicum Regel
- Allium dasyphyllum Vved.
- Allium decaisnei C.Presl
- Allium deciduum Özhatay & Kollmann
- Allium decipiens Fisch. ex Schult. & Schult.f.
- Allium decoratum Turginov & Tojibaev
- Allium delicatulum Siev. ex Schult. & Schult.f.
- Allium deneliae Balos
- Allium dentigerum Prokh.
- Allium denudatum Redouté
- Allium derderianum Regel
- Allium deserti-syriaci Feinbrun
- Allium desertorum Forssk.
- Allium diabolense (Ownbey & Aase ex Traub) McNeal – wild onion
- Allium dichlamydeum Greene – coastal onion
- Allium dictuon H.St.John – blue mountain onion
- Allium dictyoprasum C.A.Mey. ex Kunth
- Allium dictyoscordum Vved.
- Allium dilatatum Zahar.
- Allium dinsmorei Rech.f.
- Allium diomedeum Brullo, Guglielmo, Pavone & Salmeri
- Allium dirphianum Brullo, Guglielmo, Pavone, Salmeri & Terrasi
- Allium djimilense Boiss. ex Regel
- Allium dodecadontum Vved.
- Allium dodecanesi Karavok. & Tzanoud.
- Allium doenmezii Mutlu & Karakus
- Allium dolichomischum Vved.
- Allium dolichostylum Vved.
- Allium dolichovaginatum R.M.Fritsch
- Allium douglasii Hook. – Douglas' onion
- Allium drobovii Vved.
- Allium drummondii Regel – Drummond's onion, prairie onion
- Allium drusorum Feinbrun
- Allium dshungaricum Vved.
- Allium ducissae Bartolucci, Iocchi & F.Conti
- Allium dumebuchum H.J.Choi
- Allium dumetorum Feinbrun & Szel.
- Allium durangoense Traub

== E ==
- Allium ebusitanum Font Quer
- Allium eduardi Stearn ex Airy Shaw
- Allium efeae Özhatay & I.Genç
- Allium egorovae M.V.Agab. & Ogan.
- Allium ekeri E.Kaya & Koçyigit
- Allium ekimianum Eksi, Koyuncu & Özkan
- Allium elaounii El Mokni
- Allium elburzense Wendelbo
- Allium eldivanense Özhatay
- Allium elegans Drobow
- Allium elegantulum Kitag.
- Allium ellisii Hook.f.
- Allium elmaliense Deniz & Sümbül
- Allium elmendorfii M.E.Jones ex Ownbey – Elmendorf's onion
- Allium enginii Özhatay & B.Mathew
- Allium erdelii Zucc.
- Allium eremoprasum Vved.
- Allium ericetorum Thore
- Allium eriocoleum Vved.
- Allium ertugrulii Demir. & Uysal
- Allium erubescens K.Koch
- Allium erythraeum Griseb.
- Allium erzincanicum Özhatay & Kandemir
- Allium esfahanicum R.M.Fritsch
- Allium esfandiarii Matin
- Allium euboicum Rech.f.
- Allium eugenii Vved.
- Allium eulae Cory ex T.M.Howard
- Allium eurotophilum Wiggins
- Allium eusperma Airy Shaw
- Allium exaltatum (Meikle) Brullo, Pavone, Salmeri & Venora
- Allium exile Boiss. & Orph.

== F ==
- Allium falcifolium Hook. & Arn. – scytheleaf onion
- Allium fanjingshanense C.D.Yang & G.Q.Gou
- Allium fantasmasense Traub
- Allium farashinense Balos & Geçit
- Allium farctum Wendelbo
- Allium farreri Stearn
- Allium fasciculatum Rendle
- Allium favosum Zahar.
- Allium fedtschenkoi Nábelek
- Allium feinbergii Oppenh.
- Allium feqiyeteyranii Fırat
- Allium ferganicum Vved.
- Allium fethiyense Özhatay & B.Mathew
- Allium fetisowii Regel
- Allium fibriferum Wendelbo
- Allium fibrillum M.E.Jones – blue Mountain onion
- Allium filidens Regel
- Allium filidentiforme Vved.
- Allium fimbriatum S.Watson – fringed onion
- Allium fistulosum L. – Welsh onion
- Allium flavellum Vved.
- Allium flavescens Besser
- Allium flavidum Ledeb.
- Allium flavum L. – yellow onion
- Allium formosum Sennikov & Lazkov
- Allium forrestii Diels
- Allium franciniae Brullo & Pavone
- Allium fraseri (Ownbey) Shinners
- Allium frigidum Boiss. & Heldr.
- Allium fritschii F.O.Khass. & Yengal.
- Allium funckiifolium Hand.-Mazz.
- Allium furkatii R.M.Fritsch
- Allium fuscoviolaceum Fomin
- Allium fuscum Waldst. & Kit.
- Allium fussii A.Kern.

== G ==
- Allium gabardaghense Firat
- Allium galanthum Kar. & Kir.
- Allium galileum Brullo, Guglielmo, Pavone & Salmeri
- Allium garbarii Peruzzi
- Allium garganicum Brullo, Pavone, Salmeri & Terrasi
- Allium gasyunense Mouterde
- Allium gemiciana Yıld. & Kılıç
- Allium geyeri S.Watson – Geyer's onion
- Allium giganteum Regel
- Allium gilanense Bagheri & R.M.Fritsch
- Allium gilgiticum F.T.Wang & Tang
- Allium gillii Wendelbo
- Allium glaciale Vved.
- Allium glandulosum Link & Otto – gland onion
- Allium glomeratum Prokh.
- Allium glumaceum Boiss. & Hausskn.
- Allium goekyigitii Ekim, H.Duman & Güner
- Allium goloskokovii Vved.
- Allium gomphrenoides Boiss. & Heldr.
- Allium gooddingii Ownbey – Goodding's onion
- Allium gorumsense (Regel) Boiss.
- Allium goulimyi Tzanoud.
- Allium goumenissanum Ioannidis & Tzanoud.
- Allium gracillimum Vved.
- Allium gramineum K.Koch
- Allium grande Lipsky
- Allium graveolens (R.M.Fritsch) R.M.Fritsch
- Allium greuteri Brullo & Pavone
- Allium griffithianum Boiss.
- Allium grisellum J.M.Xu
- Allium grosii Font Quer
- Allium grumm-grshimailoi Kamelin & Namz.
- Allium guanxianense J.M.Xu
- Allium guatemalense Traub
- Allium gubanovii Kamelin
- Allium guicciardii Heldr.
- Allium gunibicum Miscz. ex Grossh.
- Allium gusaricum Regel
- Allium guttatum Steven
- Allium gypsaceum Popov & Vved.
- Allium gypsodictyum Vved.

== H ==
- Allium habibii F.O.Khass.
- Allium haemanthoides Boiss. & Reut. ex Regel
- Allium haematochiton S.Watson – redskin onion
- Allium halfetiense Balos
- Allium hamedanense R.M.Fritsch
- Allium hamrinense Hand.-Mazz.
- Allium haneltii F.O.Khass. & R.M.Fritsch
- Allium haussknechtii Nábelek
- Allium hedgei Wendelbo
- Allium heldreichii Boiss.
- Allium helicophyllum Vved.
- Allium hemisphaericum (Sommier) Brullo
- Allium henryi C.H.Wright
- Allium herderianum Regel
- Allium hermoneum (Kollmann & Shmida) Brullo, Guglielmo, Pavone & Salmeri
- Allium heteronema F.T.Wang & Tang
- Allium heterophyllum D.F.Xie & X.J.He
- Allium hexaceras Vved.
- Allium hickmanii Eastw. – Hickman's onion
- Allium hierosolymorum Regel
- Allium hindukuschense Kamelin & Seisums
- Allium hintoniorum B.L.Turner
- Allium hippocraticum Brullo & Salmeri
- Allium hirtovaginatum Kunth
- Allium hirtovaginum Candargy
- Allium hissaricum Vved.
- Allium hoffmanii Ownbey ex Traub – beegum onion
- Allium hollandicum R.M.Fritsch
- Allium hookeri Thwaites
- Allium hooshidaryae Mashayekhi, Zarre & R.M.Fritsch
- Allium horvatii Lovrić
- Allium hoshabicum Firat
- Allium howellii Eastw. – Howell's onion
- Allium huber-morathii Kollmann, Özhatay & Koyuncu
- Allium humile Kunth
- Allium huntiae Traub
- Allium hyalinum Curran – glassy onion
- Allium hymenorhizum Ledeb.
- Allium hymettium Boiss. & Heldr.
- Allium hypsistum Stearn

== I ==
- Allium ilgazense Özhatay
- Allium iliense Regel
- Allium inaequale Janka
- Allium incomptum Kierstead & Lindstrand
- Allium inconspicuum Vved.
- Allium incrustatum Vved.
- Allium inderiense Fisch. ex Bunge
- Allium inops Vved.
- Allium insubricum Boiss. & Reut.
- Allium insufficiens Vved.
- Allium integerrimum Zahar.
- Allium intradarvazicum R.M.Fritsch
- Allium inutile Makino
- Allium ionandrum Wendelbo
- Allium ionicum Brullo & Tzanoud.
- Allium iranicum (Wendelbo) Wendelbo
- Allium iranshahrii R.M.Fritsch
- Allium isakulii R.M.Fritsch & F.O.Khass.
- Allium isauricum Hub.-Mor. & Wendelbo
- Allium israeliticum Fragman & R.M.Fritsch
- Allium istanbulense Özhatay, Koçyigit, Brullo & Salmeri
- Allium ivasczenkoae Kotukhov
- Allium izmirense Pirhan

== J ==
- Allium jacquemontii Kunth
- Allium jaegeri R.M.Fritsch
- Allium jakuticum Sinitsyna & N.Friesen
- Allium jaxarticum Vved.
- Allium jepsonii (Ownbey & Aase ex Traub) S.S.Denison & McNeal – Jepson's onion
- Allium jesdianum Boiss. & Buhse
- Allium jichouense X.G.Ma, H.Sun & D.Q.Huang
- Allium jodanthum Vved.
- Allium joharchii F.O.Khass. & Memariani
- Allium jubatum J.F.Macbr.
- Allium jucundum Vved.
- Allium judaeum Ben-Natan & Fragman
- Allium juldusicola Regel
- Allium julianum Brullo, Gangale & Uzunov
- Allium junceum Sm.

== K ==
- Allium kandemirii I.Genç & Özhatay
- Allium karacae Koyuncu
- Allium karamanoglui Koyuncu & Kollmann
- Allium karataviense Regel
- Allium karelinii Poljak.
- Allium karistanum Brullo, Pavone & Salmeri
- Allium karsianum Fomin
- Allium karvounis Brullo, Giusso & Musarella
- Allium karyeteini Post
- Allium kaschianum Regel
- Allium kastambulense Kollmann
- Allium kasteki Popov
- Allium kayae Özhatay & Koyuncu
- Allium kazerouni Parsa
- Allium keeverae D.B.Poind., Weakley & P.J.Williams
- Allium kermesinum Rchb.
- Allium keusgenii R.M.Fritsch
- Allium kharputense Freyn & Sint.
- Allium khozratense R.M.Fritsch
- Allium kiiense (Murata) Hir.Takah.bis & M.Hotta
- Allium kingdonii Stearn
- Allium kirilovii N.Friesen & Seregin
- Allium kirindicum Bornm.
- Allium koelzii (Wendelbo) Perss. & Wendelbo
- Allium koenigianum Grossh.
- Allium kokanicum Regel
- Allium koksuense R.M.Fritsch, N.Friesen & S.V.Smirn.
- Allium kollmannianum Brullo, Pavone & Salmeri
- Allium komarowii Lipsky
- Allium kondarinum Kamelin
- Allium kopetdagense Vved.
- Allium kopsedorum R.M.Fritsch
- Allium koreanum H.J.Choi & B.U.Oh – Korean rocky chive
- Allium korolkowii Regel
- Allium kossoricum Fomin
- Allium kotschyi Boiss.
- Allium koyuncui H.Duman & Özhatay
- Allium kuhrangense Akhavan, Saeidi & R.M.Fritsch
- Allium kuhsorkhense R.M.Fritsch & Joharchi
- Allium kujukense Vved.
- Allium kunthianum Vved.
- Allium kuramense F.O.Khass. & N.Friesen
- Allium kurdistanicum Maroofi & R.M.Fritsch
- Allium kurssanovii Popov
- Allium kurtzianum Asch. & Sint. ex Kollmann
- Allium kwakense (R.M.Fritsch) R.M.Fritsch
- Allium kysylkumi Kamelin

== L ==
- Allium lachnophyllum Paine
- Allium lacunosum S.Watson – pitted onion
- Allium lagarophyllum Brullo, Pavone & Tzanoud.
- Allium lalesaricum Freyn & Bornm.
- Allium lamondiae Wendelbo
- Allium lasiophyllum Vved.
- Allium latifolium Jaub. & Spach
- Allium lazikkiyense Koçyigit, Özhatay & E.Kaya
- Allium ledebourianum Schult. & Schult.f.
- Allium lefkadense Brullo, Giusso & Musarella
- Allium lehmannianum Merckl. ex Bunge
- Allium lehmannii Lojac.
- Allium lemmonii S.Watson – Lemmon's onion
- Allium lenkoranicum Miscz. ex Grossh.
- Allium lepsicum R.M.Fritsch, N.Friesen & S.V.Smirn.
- Allium leptomorphum Vved.
- Allium leucanthum K.Koch
- Allium leucocephalum Turcz. ex Ledeb.
- Allium leucosphaerum Aitch. & Baker
- Allium levichevii F.O.Khass., Esankulov & Sulejm.
- Allium libani Boiss.
- Allium lilacinum Klotzsch
- Allium liliputianum Koçyigit, Özhatay & E.Kaya
- Allium lineare L.
- Allium linearifolium H.J.Choi & B.U.Oh – linear-leaf chive
- Allium lipskyanum Vved.
- Allium listera Stearn
- Allium litardierei J.-M.Tison
- Allium litvinovii Drobow ex Vved.
- Allium lojaconoi Brullo, Lanfr. & Pavone
- Allium longanum Pamp.
- Allium longicollum Wendelbo
- Allium longifolium (Kunth) Spreng.
- Allium longipapillatum R.M.Fritsch & Matin
- Allium longiradiatum (Regel) Vved.
- Allium longisepalum Bertol.
- Allium longispathum Redouté
- Allium longistylum Baker – riverside chive
- Allium longivaginatum Wendelbo
- Allium lopadusanum Bartolo, Brullo & Pavone
- Allium loratum Baker
- Allium lusitanicum Lam.
- Allium luteolum Halácsy
- Allium lutescens Vved.
- Allium lycaonicum Siehe ex Hayek

== M ==
- Allium maackii (Maxim.) Prokh. ex Kom.
- Allium macedonicum Zahar.
- Allium machmelianum Post
- Allium macleanii Baker
- Allium macranthum Baker
- Allium macrochaetum Boiss. & Hausskn.
- Allium macropetalum Rydb. – largeflower wild onion, desert onion
- Allium macrostemon Bunge – long-stamen chive
- Allium macrostylum Regel
- Allium macrum S.Watson – rock onion
- Allium madidum S.Watson – swamp onion
- Allium maghrebinum Brullo, Pavone & Salmeri
- Allium mahneshanense Razyfard, Zarre & R.M.Fritsch
- Allium mairei H.Lév.
- Allium majus Vved.
- Allium makrianum C.Brullo, Brullo, Giusso & Salmeri
- Allium malyschevii N.Friesen
- Allium maniaticum Brullo & Tzanoud.
- Allium mannii Traub & T.M.Howard
- Allium maowenense J.M.Xu
- Allium maraschicum Koçyigit & Özhatay
- Allium marathasicum Brullo, Pavone & Salmeri
- Allium mardinense Balos, Akan & Yıldırım
- Allium mareoticum Bornm. & Gauba
- Allium margaritae B.Fedtsch.
- Allium margaritiferum Vved.
- Allium marginatum Janka
- Allium marmoratum Seregin
- Allium marschallianum Vved.
- Allium massaessylum Batt. & Trab.
- Allium materculae Bordz.
- Allium matiniae N.Friesen & M.Abbasi
- Allium mauritanicum Brullo, Pavone & Salmeri
- Allium maximowiczii Regel – Oriental chive
- Allium megalobulbon Regel
- Allium mehmetyascharii Eker
- Allium meikleanum Brullo, Pavone & Salmeri
- Allium melanantherum Pančić
- Allium melananthum Coincy
- Allium melanogyne Greuter
- Allium melitense (Sommier & Caruana ex Borg) Cif. & Giacom.
- Allium melliferum Traub
- Allium membranaceum Ownbey ex Traub – papery onion
- Allium meronense Fragman & R.M.Fritsch
- Allium meteoricum Heldr. & Hausskn. ex Halácsy
- Allium mexicanum Traub
- Allium michaelis F.O.Khass. & Tojibaev
- Allium michoacanum Traub
- Allium micranthum Wendelbo
- Allium microdictyon Prokh.
- Allium microspathum Ekberg
- Allium minus (S.O.Yu, S.Lee & W.Lee) H.J.Choi & B.U.Oh – Manchurian aging chive
- Allium minutiflorum Regel
- Allium minutum Vved.
- Allium mirum Wendelbo
- Allium mirzajevii Tscholok.
- Allium moderense R.M.Fritsch
- Allium mogianense (R.M.Fritsch & F.O.Khass.) F.O.Khass. & Yusupov
- Allium moly L. – golden garlic, Lily leek
- Allium monachorum Stepanov
- Allium monanthum Maxim. – Korean wild chive
- Allium mongolicum Regel
- Allium monophyllum Vved. ex Czerniak.
- Allium montanostepposum N.Friesen & Seregin
- Allium montelburzense R.M.Fritsch, Salmaki & Zarre
- Allium montibaicalense N.Friesen
- Allium monticola Davidson – San Bernardino mountain onion
- Allium moschatum L.
- Allium mozaffarianii Maroofi & R.M.Fritsch
- Allium multibulbosum Jacq. syn. A. nigrum
- Allium multiflorum Desf.
- Allium munzii (Ownbey & Aase ex Traub) McNeal – Munz's allium
- Allium murat-sonayi Balos, Sonay & C.Çeçen
- Allium muratozelii Armağan
- Allium myrianthum Boiss.

== N ==
- Allium najafdaricum R.M.Fritsch
- Allium nanodes Airy Shaw
- Allium naqabense Al-Eisawi & Omar
- Allium narcissiflorum Vill.
- Allium nathaliae Seregin
- Allium nazarenum C.Brullo, Brullo, Giusso & Salmeri
- Allium neapolitanum Cirillo – white garlic, Daffodil garlic, Flowering onion
- Allium nebrodense Guss.
- Allium nebularum Stepanov
- Allium negevense Kollmann
- Allium negianum A.Pandey, K.M.Rai, Malav & S.Rajkumar
- Allium nemrutdaghense Kit Tan & Sorger
- Allium neodenticulatum Idrees & Z.Yong Zhang
- Allium nerimaniae Koçyigit & E.Kaya
- Allium neriniflorum (Herb.) G.Don
- Allium nevadense S.Watson – Nevada onion
- Allium nevii S.Watson – Nevius' garlic
- Allium nevsehirense Koyuncu & Kollmann
- Allium nevskianum Vved. ex Wendelbo
- Allium nigrum L. – black garlic
- Allium nikolaii F.O.Khass. & Achilova
- Allium noeanum Reut. ex Regel
- Allium notabile Feinbrun
- Allium nuratavicum (R.M.Fritsch & Beshko) Beshko
- Allium nuristanicum Kitam.
- Allium nutans L.

== O ==
- Allium obliquum L. – twistedleaf garlic
- Allium obtusiflorum Redouté
- Allium obtusum Lemmon – red Sierran onion
- Allium occultum Tzanoud. & Trigas
- Allium ochotense Prokh. – myeongyi, Siberian onion
- Allium oleraceum L. – field garlic
- Allium oliganthum Kar. & Kir.
- Allium olivieri Boiss.
- Allium oltense Grossh.
- Allium olympicum Boiss.
- Allium omeiense Z.Y.Zhu
- Allium opacum Rech.f.
- Allium ophiophyllum Vved.
- Allium oporinanthum Brullo, Pavone & Salmeri
- Allium optimae Greuter
- Allium oreodictyum Vved.
- Allium oreohellenicum Tzanoud., Tsakiri & Raus
- Allium oreophiloides Regel
- Allium oreophilum C.A.Mey.
- Allium oreoprasoides Vved.
- Allium oreoprasum Schrenk
- Allium oreoscordum Vved.
- Allium oreotadzhikorum R.M.Fritsch
- Allium orestis Kalpoutz., Trigas & Constantin.
- Allium orientale Boiss.
- Allium orientalialashanicum L.Q.Zhao & Y.Z.Zhao
- Allium orientoiranicum Neshati, Zarre & R.M.Fritsch
- Allium orosamium Brullo, Giusso & Musarella
- Allium orunbaii F.O.Khass. & R.M.Fritsch
- Allium oschaninii O.Fedtsch.
- Allium ovalifolium Hand.-Mazz.
- Allium ownbeyi Traub
- Allium oxianum F.O.Khass. & Tojibaev

== P ==
- Allium paepalanthoides Airy Shaw
- Allium palaestinum Kollmann ex Fragman & N.Friesen
- Allium palentinum Losa & P.Monts.
- Allium pallasii Murray
- Allium pallens L.
- Allium pamiricum Wendelbo
- Allium pangasicum Turak.
- Allium paniculatum L.
- Allium panjaoense Wendelbo
- Allium panormitanum Brullo, Pavone & Salmeri
- Allium panormitisi Galanos & Tzanoud.
- Allium papillare Boiss.
- Allium papillosum Brullo & Salmeri
- Allium paradoxum (M.Bieb.) G.Don – few-flowered leek
- Allium parciflorum Viv.
- Allium parhamii Memariani
- Allium parishii S.Watson – Parish's onion
- Allium parnassicum (Boiss.) Halácsy
- Allium parryi S.Watson – Parry's fringed onion
- Allium parvulum Vved.
- Allium parvum Kellogg – small onion
- Allium passeyi N.H.Holmgren & A.H.Holmgren – Passey's onion
- Allium pavoneanum Brullo & Salmeri
- Allium pelagicum Brullo, Pavone & Salmeri
- Allium pendulinum Ten. – Italian garlic
- Allium peninsulare Lemmon ex Greene – Mexicali onion
- Allium pentadactyli Brullo, Pavone & Spamp
- Allium perdulce S.V.Fraser – plains onion
- Allium permixtum Guss.
- Allium peroninianum Azn.
- Allium perpendiculum Koçyigit, Özhatay & E.Kaya
- Allium pervariense Firat & Koyuncu
- Allium pervestitum Klokov
- Allium petraeum Kar. & Kir.
- Allium petri F.O.Khass. & R.M.Fritsch
- Allium pevtzovii Prokh.
- Allium phanerantherum Boiss. & Hausskn.
- Allium phariense Rendle
- Allium phitosianum Brullo, Guglielmo, Pavone, Salmeri & Terrasi
- Allium phrygium Boiss. & Balansa
- Allium phthioticum Boiss. & Heldr.
- Allium pictistamineum O.Schwarz
- Allium pignattii Brullo & Salmeri
- Allium pilosum Sm.
- Allium platakisii Tzanoud. & Kypr.
- Allium platycaule S.Watson – broadstemmed onion
- Allium platyspathum Schrenk ex Fisch. & C.A.Mey.
- Allium plummerae S.Watson – Tanners canyon onion
- Allium plurifoliatum Rendle
- Allium podolicum Blocki ex Racib. & Szafer
- Allium pogonotepalum Wendelbo
- Allium polyanthum Schult. & Schult.f.
- Allium polyrhizum Turcz. ex Regel
- Allium ponticum Miscz. ex Grossh.
- Allium popovii Vved.
- Allium porrum L.
- Allium potosiense Traub
- Allium praecox Brandegee – early onion
- Allium praemixtum Vved.
- Allium praescissum Rchb.
- Allium prattii C.H.Wright
- Allium proponticum Stearn & Özhatay
- Allium prostratum Trevir.
- Allium protensum Wendelbo
- Allium pruinatum Link ex Spreng.
- Allium przewalskianum Regel
- Allium psebaicum Mikheev
- Allium pseudoalbidum N.Friesen & Özhatay
- Allium pseudoampeloprasum Miscz. ex Grossh.
- Allium pseudobodeanum R.M.Fritsch & Matin
- Allium pseudocalyptratum Mouterde
- Allium pseudoflavum Vved.
- Allium pseudofraseri T.M.Howard
- Allium pseudohollandicum R.M.Fritsch
- Allium pseudojaponicum Makino – coastal chive
- Allium pseudophanerantherum Rech.f.
- Allium pseudosenescens H.J.Choi & B.U.Oh
- Allium pseudostamineum Kollmann & Shmida
- Allium pseudostrictum Albov
- Allium pseudotelmatum Duchoslav & Jandová
- Allium pseudowinklerianum R.M.Fritsch & F.O.Khass.
- Allium pshikharvicum (R.M.Fritsch & F.O.Khass.) F.O.Khass. & Yusupov
- Allium pskemense B.Fedtsch.
- Allium pueblanum Traub
- Allium pumilum Vved.
- Allium punctum L.F.Hend. – dotted onion
- Allium purpureotunicatum Aytaç, Ekşi & Koçyiğit
- Allium purpureoviride Koyuncu & I.Genç
- Allium pustulosum Boiss. & Hausskn.
- Allium pycnotrichum Trigas, Kalpoutz. & Constantin.
- Allium pyrenaicum Costa & Vayr.
- Allium pythagoricum Brullo & Salmeri

== Q ==
- Allium quercetorum (Seregin) Seregin

== R ==
- Allium ramosum L. – fragrant-flowered garlic
- Allium rausii Brullo, Guglielmo, Pavone, Salmeri & Terrasi
- Allium ravenii F.O.Khass., Shomur. & Kadyrov
- Allium rechingeri Wendelbo
- Allium regelianum A.K.Becker
- Allium regelii Trautv.
- Allium registanicum Wendelbo
- Allium remediorum (R.M.Fritsch) R.M.Fritsch
- Allium retrorsum (Özhatay & Kollmann) Brullo, Guglielmo, Pavone & Salmeri
- Allium reuterianum Boiss.
- Allium rhabdotum Stearn
- Allium rhetoreanum Nábelek
- Allium rhizomatum Wooton & Standl.
- Allium rhodiacum Brullo, Pavone & Salmeri
- Allium rhodopeum Velen.
- Allium rhynchogynum Diels
- Allium rinae F.O.Khass., Shomur. & Tojibaev
- Allium ritsi Iatroú & Tzanoud.
- Allium robertianum Kollmann
- Allium robinsonii L.F.Hend. – Robinson's onion
- Allium roborowskianum Regel
- Allium robustum Kar. & Kir.
- Allium rollovii Grossh.
- Allium rosenbachianum Regel
- Allium rosenorum R.M.Fritsch
- Allium roseum L. – rosy garlic
- Allium rothii Zucc.
- Allium rotundum L.
- Allium rouyi Gaut.
- Allium roylei Stearn
- Allium rubellum M.Bieb.
- Allium rubens Spreng.
- Allium rubriflorum (Adamović) Anackov, N.Friesen & Seregin
- Allium rubrovittatum Boiss. & Heldr.
- Allium rude J.M.Xu
- Allium ruhmerianum Asch. ex E.A.Durand & Barratte
- Allium rumelicum Koçyigit & Özhatay
- Allium runemarkii Trigas & Tzanoud.
- Allium runyonii Ownbey – Runyon's onion
- Allium rupestre Steven
- Allium rupestristepposum N.Friesen
- Allium rupicola Boiss. ex Mouterde

== S ==
- Allium sabalense R.M.Fritsch
- Allium sabulosum Steven ex Bunge
- Allium sabzakense Wendelbo
- Allium sacculiferum Maxim. – northern plain chive, triangular chive
- Allium sahandicum R.M.Fritsch
- Allium sairamense Regel
- Allium salinum A.I.Baranov & Skvortsov
- Allium samniticum Brullo, Pavone & Salmeri
- Allium samothracicum Tzanoud., Strid & Kit Tan
- Allium samurense Tscholok.
- Allium sanandajense Maroofi & R.M.Fritsch
- Allium sanbornii Alph.Wood – Sanborn's onion
- Allium sandrasicum Kollmann, Özhatay & Bothmer
- Allium sannineum Gomb.
- Allium saposhnikovii Nikitina
- Allium saralicum R.M.Fritsch
- Allium sarawschanicum Regel
- Allium sardoum Moris
- Allium saricanense Balos, Sonay & Koçyiğit
- Allium sarychelekense Krassovsk.
- Allium sativum L. – cultivated garlic
- Allium savii Parl.
- Allium savranicum (Nyman) Oxner
- Allium saxatile M.Bieb.
- Allium scaberrimum J.Serres
- Allium scabriflorum Boiss.
- Allium scabriscapum Boiss.
- Allium schachimardanicum Vved.
- Allium scharobitdinii F.O.Khass. & Tojibaev
- Allium schergianum Boiss.
- Allium schischkinii Sobolevsk.
- Allium schisticola R.M.Fritsch, Moazzeni & Dolatyari
- Allium schistosum N.Friesen & Seregin
- Allium schmitzii Cout.
- Allium schoenoprasoides Regel
- Allium schoenoprasum L. – wild chive
- Allium schrenkii Regel
- Allium schubertii Zucc. – Schubert's garlic
- Allium schugnanicum Vved.
- Allium scilloides Douglas ex S.Watson – fragile onion
- Allium scorodoprasum L. – sand leek, rocambole, Korean pickled-peel garlic
- Allium scorzonerifolium Desf. ex Redouté
- Allium scotostemon Wendelbo
- Allium scrobiculatum Vved.
- Allium seirotrichum Ducell. & Maire
- Allium semenovii Regel
- Allium senescens L. – aging chive, German garlic
- Allium serbicum Vis. & Pancic
- Allium sergii Vved.
- Allium serpenticola Eker
- Allium serpentinicum I.Genç & Özhatay
- Allium serra McNeal & Ownbey – jeweled onion
- Allium setifolium Schrenk ex Fisch. & C.A.Mey.
- Allium severtzovioides R.M.Fritsch
- Allium sewerzowii Regel
- Allium shahinii H.Duman & Eksi
- Allium sharsmithiae (Ownbey & Aase ex Traub) McNeal – Mount Hamilton onion
- Allium shatakiense Rech.f.
- Allium shelkovnikovii Grossh.
- Allium shevockii McNeal – Spanish needle onion
- Allium shinasii Armağan
- Allium shirnakiense Behçet & Rüstem.
- Allium sibthorpianum Schult. & Schult.f.
- Allium siculum Ucria
- Allium sieheanum Hausskn. ex Kollmann
- Allium sikkimense Baker
- Allium simillimum L.F.Hend. – Simil onion
- Allium sinaiticum Boiss.
- Allium sindjarense Boiss. & Hausskn. ex Regel
- Allium sinkiangense F.T.Wang & Y.C.Tang
- Allium sintenisii Freyn
- Allium siphonanthum J.M.Xu
- Allium sipyleum Boiss.
- Allium siskiyouense Ownbey ex Traub – Siskiyou onion
- Allium sivasicum Özhatay & Kollmann
- Allium smyrnaeum Brullo & Salmeri
- Allium sochense R.M.Fritsch & U.Turak.
- Allium songpanicum J.M.Xu
- Allium sordidiflorum Vved.
- Allium sosnovskyanum Miscz. ex Grossh.
- Allium spathaceum Steud. ex A.Rich.
- Allium spathulatum F.O.Khass. & R.M.Fritsch
- Allium speculae Ownbey & Aase – little River Canyon onion
- Allium sphaerocephalon L. – round-headed leek, round-headed garlic, Ball-head onion
- Allium sphaeronixum Koçyiğit, Salmeri, Özhatay, E.Kaya & Brullo
- Allium spicatum (Prain) N.Friesen
- Allium spirophyllum Wendelbo
- Allium splendens Willd. ex Schult. & Schult.f. – glittering chive
- Allium sprengeri Regel
- Allium spurium G.Don
- Allium stamatiadae Trigas
- Allium stamineum Boiss.
- Allium staticiforme Sm.
- Allium stearnianum Koyuncu, Özhatay & Kollmann
- Allium stellatum Nutt. ex Ker Gawl. – autumn onion, prairie onion
- Allium stellerianum Willd.
- Allium stenopetalum Boiss. & Kotschy ex Regel
- Allium stephanophorum Vved.
- Allium stipitatum Regel
- Allium stocksianum Boiss.
- Allium stoloniferum Ownbey & T.D.Jacobson
- Allium stracheyi Baker
- Allium straussii Bornm.
- Allium strictum Schrad.
- Allium struzlianum Ogan.
- Allium stylosum O.Schwarz
- Allium suaveolens Jacq.
- Allium subakaka Razyfard & Zarre
- Allium subangulatum Regel
- Allium subhirsutum L.
- Allium subkopetdagense (R.M.Fritsch & F.O.Khass.) R.M.Fritsch
- Allium subnotabile Wendelbo
- Allium subscabrum (Regel) R.M.Fritsch
- Allium subtilissimum Ledeb.
- Allium subvillosum Salzm. ex Schult. & Schult.f.
- Allium sulaimanicum N.Khan, A.Sultan & N.Friesen
- Allium sulphureum Vved.
- Allium sultaniae-ferhanii Balos
- Allium sultaniae-ismailii Yıldırım
- Allium sunhangii F.O.Khass., Tojibaev & Yusupov
- Allium suworowii Regel
- Allium svetlanae Vved. ex Filim.
- Allium symiacum Galanos & Tzanoud.
- Allium synnotii G.Don
- Allium szovitsii Regel

== T ==
- Allium taciturnum Vved.
- Allium taeniopetalum Popov & Vved.
- Allium taishanense J.M.Xu
- Allium taiwanianum S.S.Ying
- Allium talassicum Regel
- Allium talijevii Klokov
- Allium talyschense Miscz. ex Grossh.
- Allium tanguticum Regel
- Allium taquetii H.Lév. & Vaniot – Halla chive
- Allium tardans Greuter & Zahar.
- Allium tardiflorum Kollmann & Shmida
- Allium tarkhankuticum Seregin
- Allium taschkenticum F.O.Khass. & R.M.Fritsch
- Allium tatyanae F.O.Khass. & F.Karimov
- Allium tauricola Boiss.
- Allium tchihatschewii Boiss.
- Allium tekesicola Regel
- Allium tel-avivense Eig
- Allium telaponense Traub
- Allium telmatum Bogdanovic, Brullo, Giusso & Salmeri
- Allium tenuicaule Regel
- Allium tenuiflorum Ten.
- Allium tenuissimum L.
- Allium teretifolium Regel
- Allium tetraploideum M.J.Li & X.J.He
- Allium texanum T.M.Howard
- Allium textile A.Nelson & J.F.Macbr. – textile onion
- Allium therinanthum C.Brullo, Brullo, Fragman, Giusso & Salmeri
- Allium thessalicum Brullo, Pavone, Salmeri & Tzanoud.
- Allium thunbergii G.Don – Thunberg's chive
- Allium tianmuense Z.H.Chen & Yue L.Xu
- Allium tianschanicum Rupr.
- Allium tingitanum Brullo, Pavone & Salmeri
- Allium togashii H.Hara
- Allium tokalense Kamelin & Levichev
- Allium toksanbaicum N.Friesen & Veselova
- Allium tolmiei Baker – Tolm's onion
- Allium tourneuxii Chabert
- Allium trachycoleum Wendelbo
- Allium trachyscordum Vved.
- Allium transvestiens Vved.
- Allium traubii T.M.Howard
- Allium trautvetterianum Regel
- Allium tribracteatum Torr. – threebract onion
- Allium trichocnemis J.Gay
- Allium trichospathum Brullo & Salmeri
- Allium tricoccum Aiton – wild leek, ramp
- Allium trifoliatum Cirillo
- Allium trifurcatum (F.T.Wang & Tang) J.M.Xu
- Allium tripedale Trautv.
- Allium tripterum Nasir
- Allium triquetrum L. – threecorner leek, Three-cornered leek
- Allium truncatum (Feinbrun) Kollmann & D.Zohary
- Allium tschimganicum B.Fedtsch.
- Allium tschulaktavicum Bajtenov & Nelina
- Allium tsinlingense Xun & P.L.Liu
- Allium tubergenii Freyn
- Allium tuberosum Rottler ex Spreng. – Chinese chive, garlic chive, Oriental garlic
- Allium tubiflorum Rendle
- Allium tuchalense F.O.Khass. & Noroozi
- Allium tulipifolium Ledeb.
- Allium tuncelianum (Kollmann) Özhatay, B.Mathew & Siraneci
- Allium tuolumnense (Ownbey & Aase ex Traub) S.S.Denison & McNeal – serpentine onion
- Allium turakulovii (R.M.Fritsch & F.O.Khass.) F.O.Khass. & Yusupov
- Allium turcicum Özhatay & Cowley
- Allium turcomanicum Regel
- Allium turkestanicum Regel
- Allium turtschicum Regel
- Allium tuvinicum (N.Friesen) N.Friesen
- Allium tytthanthum Vved.
- Allium tytthocephalum Schult. & Schult.f.
- Allium tzanoudakisanum Brullo, Pavone & Salmeri

== U ==
- Allium ubipetrense R.M.Fritsch
- Allium ubsicola Regel
- Allium umbilicatum Boiss.
- Allium undulatipetalum İ.Genç & N.Özhatay
- Allium unifolium Kellogg – oneleaf onion, one-leaved onion
- Allium urmiense Kamelin & Seisums
- Allium ursinum L. – ramson, buckram

== V ==
- Allium valdecallosum Maire & Weiller
- Allium valdesianum Brullo
- Allium valentinae Pavlov
- Allium validum S.Watson – Pacific onion, swamp onion
- Allium vallivanchense R.M.Fritsch & N.Friesen
- Allium variegatum Boiss.
- Allium vasilevskajae Ogan.
- Allium vavilovii Popov & Vved.
- Allium verticillatum Regel
- Allium vescum Wendelbo
- Allium victorialis L. – victory onion, Alpine leek, alpine broad-leaf allium
- Allium victoris Vved.
- Allium vineale L. – wild garlic, crow garlic, Stag's garlic
- Allium vinicolor Wendelbo
- Allium virgunculae Maek. & Kitam.
- Allium viridiflorum Pobed.
- Allium viridulum Ledeb.
- Allium vodopjanovae N.Friesen
- Allium vvedenskyanum Pavlov

== W ==
- Allium wallichii Kunth
- Allium warzobicum Kamelin
- Allium weissii Boiss.
- Allium wendelboanum Kollmann
- Allium wendelboi Matin
- Allium weschniakowii Regel
- Allium wiedemannianum Regel
- Allium willeanum Holmboe
- Allium winklerianum Regel
- Allium woronowii Miscz. ex Grossh.

== X ==
- Allium xiangchengense J.M.Xu
- Allium xichuanense J.M.Xu
- Allium xiphopetalum Aitch. & Baker

== Y ==
- Allium yanchiense J.M.Xu
- Allium yildirimlii Dural
- Allium yongdengense J.M.Xu
- Allium yosemitense Eastw. – Yosemite onion
- Allium yuanum F.T.Wang & Tang

== Z ==
- Allium zagricum R.M.Fritsch
- Allium zaissanicum Kotukhov
- Allium zaprjagajevii Kassacz
- Allium zebdanense Boiss. & Noë
- Allium zergericum F.O.Khass. & R.M.Fritsch
