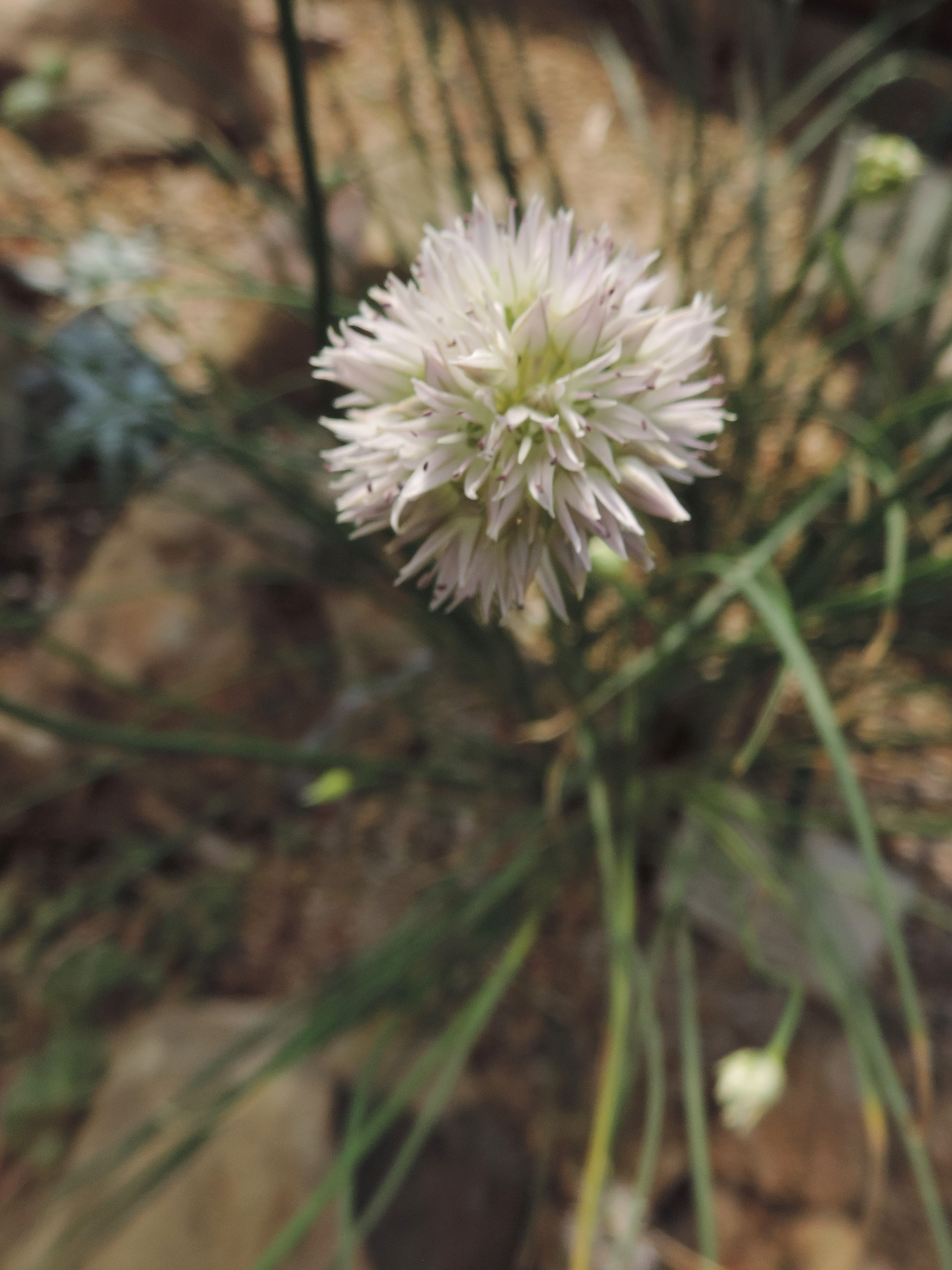

Scientific classification
- Kingdom: Plantae
- Clade: Tracheophytes
- Clade: Angiosperms
- Clade: Monocots
- Order: Asparagales
- Family: Amaryllidaceae
- Subfamily: Allioideae
- Genus: Allium
- Species: A. glomeratum

Binomial name
- Allium glomeratum Prokh.

= Allium glomeratum =

Species of flowering plant

Allium glomeratum is a Central Asian species of onion native to Xinjiang, Kyrgyzstan, Tajikistan, and Kazakhstan. It occurs at elevations of 1500–3000 m.

Allium glomeratum produces one round bulb up to 20 mm across. Scapes are up to 30 cm tall. Flowers are pale purple.

== See also ==
- List of Allium species
