= Allium therinanthum =

Scientific classification
- Kingdom: Plantae
- Clade: Embryophytes
- Clade: Tracheophytes
- Clade: Spermatophytes
- Clade: Angiosperms
- Clade: Monocots
- Order: Asparagales
- Family: Amaryllidaceae
- Subfamily: Allioideae
- Genus: Allium
- Species: A. therinanthum

Binomial name
- Allium therinanthum Brullo

Species of flowering plant

Allium therinanthum or summer garlic is a species of garlic that is found in the Mount Hermon area in Israel.

== See also ==
- List of Allium species
