= Allium eduardii =

贺兰韭 he lan jiu

Scientific classification
- Kingdom: Plantae
- Clade: Tracheophytes
- Clade: Angiosperms
- Clade: Monocots
- Order: Asparagales
- Family: Amaryllidaceae
- Subfamily: Allioideae
- Genus: Allium
- Subgenus: A. subg. Rhizirideum
- Species: A. eduardii

Binomial name
- Allium eduardii Stearn ex Airy Shaw

Synonyms
- Allium fischeri Regel 1875, illegitimate homonym not Besser 1830; Allium eduardi alternate spelling

Species of flowering plant

Allium eduardii is a plant species native to Russia, Mongolia, and northern China (Hebei, Nei Mongol (Inner Mongolia), Ningxia and Xinjiang).

Allium eduardii has narrowly egg-shaped bulbs up to 10 mm across. Scapes are round in cross-section, up to 30 cm tall. Leaves are narrow and tubular, shorter than the scape. Umbel is hemispheric with purple flowers.
