= Allium chodsha-bakirganicum =

Scientific classification
- Kingdom: Plantae
- Clade: Tracheophytes
- Clade: Angiosperms
- Clade: Monocots
- Order: Asparagales
- Family: Amaryllidaceae
- Subfamily: Allioideae
- Genus: Allium
- Subgenus: Allium subg. Melanocrommyum
- Species: A. chodsha-bakirganicum

Binomial name
- Allium chodsha-bakirganicum Gaffarov & Turak.

Species of flowering plant

Allium chodsha-bakirganicum is a plant species endemic to Kyrgyzstan.
