= Allium teretifolium =

西疆韭 xi jiang jiu

Scientific classification
- Kingdom: Plantae
- Clade: Tracheophytes
- Clade: Angiosperms
- Clade: Monocots
- Order: Asparagales
- Family: Amaryllidaceae
- Subfamily: Allioideae
- Genus: Allium
- Species: A. teretifolium

Binomial name
- Allium teretifolium Regel

Synonyms
- Allium grimmii Regel

Species of flowering plant

Allium teretifolium is a plant species native to Xinjiang, Kazakhstan and Kyrgyzstan.

Allium teretifolium produces clusters of narrow bulbs, each about 10 mm in diameter. Scapes are up to 50 cm long, round in cross-section. Leaves are tubular, about 1 mm wide, shorter than the scape. Flowers are pink or violet.
