= Allium pevtzovii =

昆仑韭 kun lun jiu

Scientific classification
- Kingdom: Plantae
- Clade: Tracheophytes
- Clade: Angiosperms
- Clade: Monocots
- Order: Asparagales
- Family: Amaryllidaceae
- Subfamily: Allioideae
- Genus: Allium
- Species: A. pevtzovii

Binomial name
- Allium pevtzovii Prokh.

Species of flowering plant

Allium pevtzovii is a Chinese species of wild onion found only in the southwestern part of Xinjiang Uygur Province in extreme western China.

Allium pevtzovii has a cluster of narrow, cylindrical bulbs. Scapes are up to 25 cm (9.8 in) tall. Umbel is a dense cluster of red, lustrous flowers.
