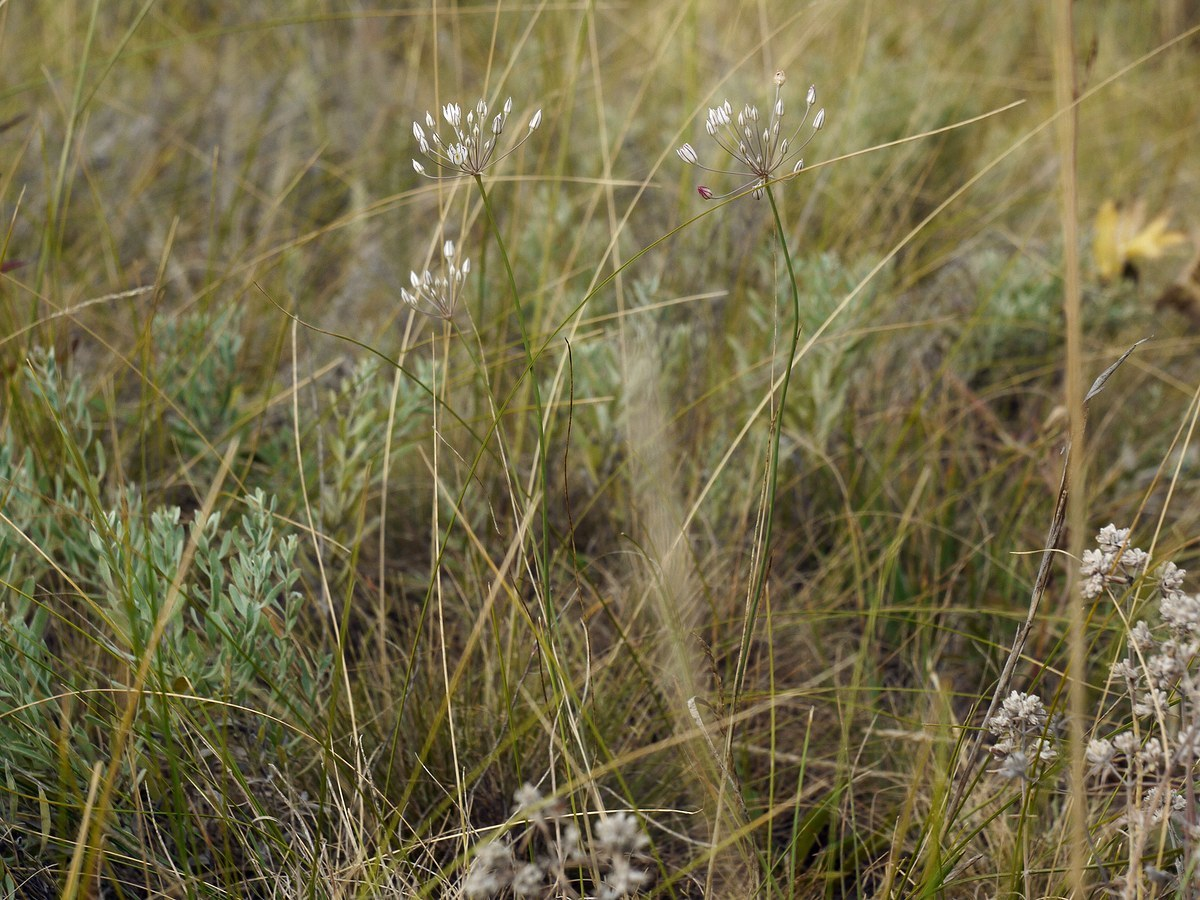
- In bloom in Ukraine

Scientific classification
- Kingdom: Plantae
- Clade: Tracheophytes
- Clade: Angiosperms
- Clade: Monocots
- Order: Asparagales
- Family: Amaryllidaceae
- Subfamily: Allioideae
- Genus: Allium
- Species: A. inaequale

Binomial name
- Allium inaequale Janke

= Allium inaequale =

Species of plant

Allium inaequale is a species of wild onion in the family Amaryllidaceae, native to Ukraine, Crimea, central and southern European Russia, the northern Caucasus, and Kazakhstan. There it is often found growing on kurgans (burial mounds).
