= Allium bellulum =

Scientific classification
- Kingdom: Plantae
- Clade: Tracheophytes
- Clade: Angiosperms
- Clade: Monocots
- Order: Asparagales
- Family: Amaryllidaceae
- Subfamily: Allioideae
- Genus: Allium
- Species: A. bellulum

Binomial name
- Allium bellulum Prokh.

Species of flowering plant

Allium bellulum is a species of flowering plant in the family Amaryllidaceae. The species is native to Kazakhstan and Russia, and was described in 1930.

== Taxonomy ==
The species was described by Jaroslav Ivanovic Prokhanov in 1930.

== Distribution ==
Allium bellulum is native to the temperate biome of Kazakhstan and Krasnoyarsk, Russia.

== Description ==
Allium bellulum has underground storage organs.

== Nomenclature ==
In Russian, Allium bellulum is known as Лук красивенький (Luk krasiven'kij).
