= Allium elegans =

Scientific classification
- Kingdom: Plantae
- Clade: Tracheophytes
- Clade: Angiosperms
- Clade: Monocots
- Order: Asparagales
- Family: Amaryllidaceae
- Subfamily: Allioideae
- Genus: Allium
- Species: A. elegans

Binomial name
- Allium elegans Drobow

Species of flowering plant

Allium elegans is a species of flowering plants. It is native to Tadzhikistan, Uzbekistan and Kirgizistan.
