= Allium chiwui =

冀韭 ji jiu

Scientific classification
- Kingdom: Plantae
- Clade: Tracheophytes
- Clade: Angiosperms
- Clade: Monocots
- Order: Asparagales
- Family: Amaryllidaceae
- Subfamily: Allioideae
- Genus: Allium
- Species: A. chiwui

Binomial name
- Allium chiwui Xu, Jie Mei

Species of flowering plant

Allium chiwui is a plant species endemic to the Chinese Province of Hebei. The plant grows on slopes at elevations of 2100–2500 m.

Allium chiwui produces bulbs up to 15 mm in diameter. Scapes are up to 30 cm tall. Leaves are linear, flat, shorter than the scape. Umbels are hemispheric, with many white or yellow flowers crowded together.
