= Allium leucocephalum =

白头韭 bai tou jiu

Scientific classification
- Kingdom: Plantae
- Clade: Tracheophytes
- Clade: Angiosperms
- Clade: Monocots
- Order: Asparagales
- Family: Amaryllidaceae
- Subfamily: Allioideae
- Genus: Allium
- Species: A. leucocephalum

Binomial name
- Allium leucocephalum Turcz. ex Ledeb.

Species of flowering plant

Allium leucocephalum is an Asian species native to Buryatiya, Zabaykalsky Krai, Mongolia, Inner Mongolia, Gansu, and Heilongjiang.

Allium leucocephalum produces one or two bulbs, each up to 13 mm across. Scape is up to 60 cm tall. Leaves are more or less tubular, shorter than the scape. Umbel is spherical crowded with many white or very pale yellow flowers.
