= Allium azutavicum =

Scientific classification
- Kingdom: Plantae
- Clade: Tracheophytes
- Clade: Angiosperms
- Clade: Monocots
- Order: Asparagales
- Family: Amaryllidaceae
- Subfamily: Allioideae
- Genus: Allium
- Species: A. azutavicum

Binomial name
- Allium azutavicum Kotukhov

Species of flowering plant

Allium azutavicum is a rare plant species endemic to Kazakhstan.
