= Allium dolichostylum =

Scientific classification
- Kingdom: Plantae
- Clade: Tracheophytes
- Clade: Angiosperms
- Clade: Monocots
- Order: Asparagales
- Family: Amaryllidaceae
- Subfamily: Allioideae
- Genus: Allium
- Species: A. dolichostylum

Binomial name
- Allium dolichostylum Vved.

Synonyms
- Allium pseudoxiphopetalum Wendelbo

Species of plant

Allium dolichostylum is an Asian species of onion native to Kazakhstan, Uzbekistan, Kyrgyzstan, Afghanistan and Pakistan. It is a perennial herb up to 50 cm tall, with a dense umbel of purple flowers.
