= Allium humile =

Small Alpine Onion 雪韭 xue jiu

Scientific classification
- Kingdom: Plantae
- Clade: Tracheophytes
- Clade: Angiosperms
- Clade: Monocots
- Order: Asparagales
- Family: Amaryllidaceae
- Subfamily: Allioideae
- Genus: Allium
- Species: A. humile

Binomial name
- Allium humile Kunth

Synonyms
- Allium govanianum Wall. ex Baker; Allium nivale Jacquem. ex Hook.f. & Thomson

Species of plant

Allium humile is an Asian species of wild onion found at high elevations (4000–4500 m) in India (Jammu-Kashmir, Uttarakhand, Uttar Pradesh, Himachal Pradesh), Nepal, northern Pakistan, Tibet, and Yunnan.

Allium humile has narrow, cylindrical bulbs. Scape is up to 15 cm tall, slightly compressed. Leaves are flat, fleshy, linear, about 5 mm wide. Umbel is hemispheric, crowded with many flowers. Tepals are white with yellowish-green midveins.

The species formerly included a variety Allium humile var. trifurcatum F.T.Wang & Tang which is since 1991 called Allium trifurcatum (F.T.Wang & Tang) J.M.Xu.
