= Allium umbilicatum =

Scientific classification
- Kingdom: Plantae
- Clade: Embryophytes
- Clade: Tracheophytes
- Clade: Spermatophytes
- Clade: Angiosperms
- Clade: Monocots
- Order: Asparagales
- Family: Amaryllidaceae
- Subfamily: Allioideae
- Genus: Allium
- Subgenus: A. subg. Allium
- Species: A. umbilicatum

Binomial name
- Allium umbilicatum Boiss.

Synonyms
- Allium aitchisonii Regel; Allium scabrellum Boiss. & Buhse

Species of flowering plant

Allium umbilicatum is a species of flowering plant in the family Amaryllidaceae. It is a wild onion native to Pakistan, Afghanistan, Turkmenistan, Uzbekistan, Iran, and Tajikistan. It is a herbaceous perennial up to 40 cm (16 in) tall, with an egg-shaped bulb up to 15 mm long. The leaves are tubular. The umbels are hemispherical and densely crowded with many pink flowers.
