= Allium yongdengense =

永登韭 yong deng jiu

Scientific classification
- Kingdom: Plantae
- Clade: Tracheophytes
- Clade: Angiosperms
- Clade: Monocots
- Order: Asparagales
- Family: Amaryllidaceae
- Subfamily: Allioideae
- Genus: Allium
- Species: A. yongdengense

Binomial name
- Allium yongdengense Xu, Jie Mei

Species of plant

Allium yongdengense is a plant species native to the Gansu and Qinghai regions in China.

Allium yongdengense has a cluster of narrow bulbs each up to 5 mm in diameter. Scape is generally less than 20 cm tall. Leaves are shorter than the scape, about 1 mm across. Umbels have only a few purplish flowers.
