= Allium melliferum =

Scientific classification
- Kingdom: Plantae
- Clade: Tracheophytes
- Clade: Angiosperms
- Clade: Monocots
- Order: Asparagales
- Family: Amaryllidaceae
- Subfamily: Allioideae
- Genus: Allium
- Species: A. melliferum

Binomial name
- Allium melliferum Traub

Species of flowering plant

Allium melliferum is a species of plant in the amaryllis family and is native to Mexico.
