= Allium brevidentatum =

矮齿韭 ai chi jiu

Scientific classification
- Kingdom: Plantae
- Clade: Tracheophytes
- Clade: Angiosperms
- Clade: Monocots
- Order: Asparagales
- Family: Amaryllidaceae
- Subfamily: Allioideae
- Genus: Allium
- Species: A. brevidentatum

Binomial name
- Allium brevidentatum F.Z. Li

Species of plant

Allium brevidentatum is a plant species endemic to the Province of Shandong in eastern China. It grows on sun-lit hillsides.

Allium brevidentatum produces a cylindrical bulb. Scape is up to 30 cm tall, mostly round in cross-section but with a few fine angles near the top. Flowers are pale yellow-green.
