= Allium chitralicum =

Scientific classification
- Kingdom: Plantae
- Clade: Tracheophytes
- Clade: Angiosperms
- Clade: Monocots
- Order: Asparagales
- Family: Amaryllidaceae
- Subfamily: Allioideae
- Genus: Allium
- Subgenus: Allium subg. Melanocrommyum
- Species: A. chitralicum

Binomial name
- Allium chitralicum F.T. Wang & Tang

Synonyms
- Allium badakhshanicum Wendelbo; Allium chitralicum var. bifoliatum F.T.Wang & Tang; Allium pauli Vved.

Species of plant

Allium chitralicum is a plant species found in the Himalayas of Afghanistan, Tajikistan and Pakistan. It has an egg-shaped bulb up to 15 mm long, narrow leaves, and rose-colored flowers.
