= Allium heteronema =

异梗韭 yi geng jiu

Scientific classification
- Kingdom: Plantae
- Clade: Tracheophytes
- Clade: Angiosperms
- Clade: Monocots
- Order: Asparagales
- Family: Amaryllidaceae
- Subfamily: Allioideae
- Genus: Allium
- Species: A. heteronema

Binomial name
- Allium heteronema F.T. Wang & T. Tang

Species of plant

Allium heteronema is a plant species endemic to Sichuan in China. It grows on hillsides at elevations of 1600–2300 m.

Allium heteronema has bulbs about 1 cm across. Scapes are up to 30 tall. Leaves are about the same length as the scape. Umbel has only a few bluish-purple flowers.
