= Allium bolanderi =

Bolander's onion

Scientific classification
- Kingdom: Plantae
- Clade: Tracheophytes
- Clade: Angiosperms
- Clade: Monocots
- Order: Asparagales
- Family: Amaryllidaceae
- Subfamily: Allioideae
- Genus: Allium
- Species: A. bolanderi

Binomial name
- Allium bolanderi S.Wats.

Synonyms
- Allium bolanderi var. stenanthum (Drew) Jeps.; Allium stenanthum Drew

Species of flowering plant

Allium bolanderi is a species of wild onion known by the common name Bolander's onion. It is native to northern California and southwestern Oregon, where it grows in the rocky soils of the Klamath Mountains and surrounding regions.

Allium bolanderi grows from an oval-shaped bulb up to 2 cm (3/4 in) long with associated rhizomes. The stem reaches about 35 cm (14 in) in maximum height and there are two or three long, cylindrical leaves about the same length as the stem. The inflorescence contains 10 to 20 reddish-purple, or occasionally white, flowers, each with very finely toothed tepals.

Two varieties are recognized:

- Allium bolanderi var. bolanderi
- Allium bolanderi var. mirabile (L.F.Hend.) McNeal
