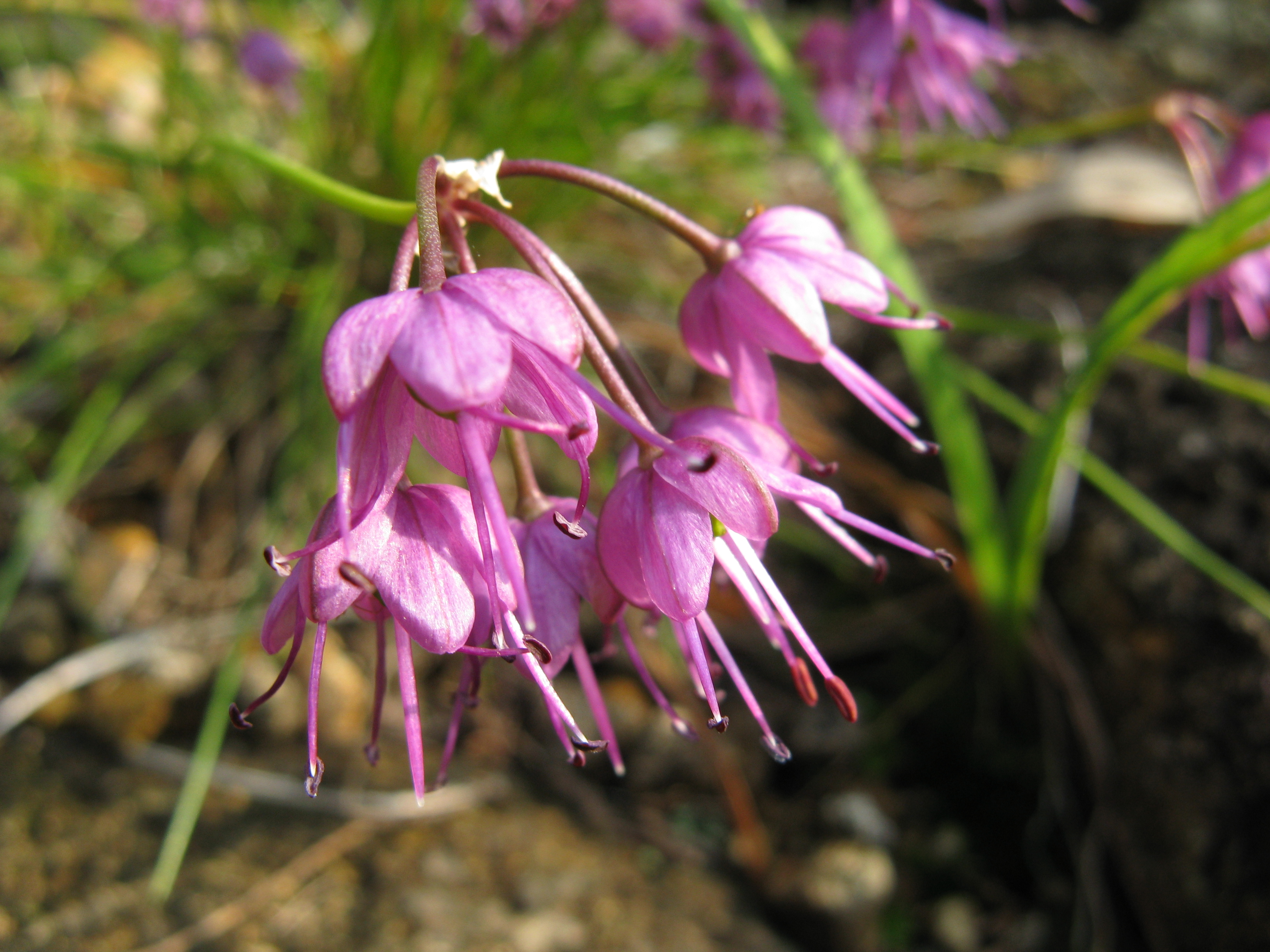

Scientific classification
- Kingdom: Plantae
- Clade: Embryophytes
- Clade: Tracheophytes
- Clade: Spermatophytes
- Clade: Angiosperms
- Clade: Monocots
- Order: Asparagales
- Family: Amaryllidaceae
- Subfamily: Allioideae
- Genus: Allium
- Species: A. virgunculae

Binomial name
- Allium virgunculae F.Maek. & Kitam.

= Allium virgunculae =

Species of flowering plant

Allium virgunculae is a species of onion native to warm areas of Kyushu, Japan. Available from commercial suppliers, it is a late blooming ornamental onion, reaching about 25 cm (9.8 in), and considered to be a good plant to attract pollinators.

== Varieties ==
The following varieties are currently accepted:

- Allium virgunculae var. koshikiense M.Hotta & Hir.Takah.bis
- Allium virgunculae var. virgunculae
- Allium virgunculae var. yakushimense M.Hotta
