= Allium baluchistanicum =

Baluchistan onion

Scientific classification
- Kingdom: Plantae
- Clade: Tracheophytes
- Clade: Angiosperms
- Clade: Monocots
- Order: Asparagales
- Family: Amaryllidaceae
- Subfamily: Allioideae
- Genus: Allium
- Species: A. baluchistanicum

Binomial name
- Allium baluchistanicum Wendelbo

Species of plant

Allium baluchistanicum is a plant species endemic to the Baluchistan region in Pakistan.

Allium baluchistanicum has cylindrical bulbs about 9 mm long. Scape is up to 50 cm tall. Flowers are white with reddish midveins.
