= Allium micranthum =

Scientific classification
- Kingdom: Plantae
- Clade: Tracheophytes
- Clade: Angiosperms
- Clade: Monocots
- Order: Asparagales
- Family: Amaryllidaceae
- Subfamily: Allioideae
- Genus: Allium
- Species: A. micranthum

Binomial name
- Allium micranthum Wendelbo

Species of plant

Allium micranthum is a plant species native to Pakistan and Afghanistan. It is a perennial herb with an egg-shaped bulb about 10 mm across. Scape is up to 40 cm tall. Leaves are narrowly linear, up to 3 mm across. Umbels are almost spherical, with many flowers crowded together. Tepals are tiny, measuring no more than 3 mm in length, and are purple.
