= Allium songpanicum =

松潘薤 song pan xie

Scientific classification
- Kingdom: Plantae
- Clade: Tracheophytes
- Clade: Angiosperms
- Clade: Monocots
- Order: Asparagales
- Family: Amaryllidaceae
- Subfamily: Allioideae
- Genus: Allium
- Species: A. songpanicum

Binomial name
- Allium songpanicum Xu, Jie Mei

Species of plant

Allium songpanicum is a plant species endemic to Sichuan Province in southern China. It grows in forests and brushlands at an elevation of approximately 1600–1700 m.

Allium songpanicum has bulbs up to 15 mm across. Scape is up to 20 cm tall, round in cross-section. Leaves are long and very narrow, about the same length as the scape but only about 3 mm across, often drooping under its own weight. Umbel has only a few reddish-purple flowers.
