= Allium koreanum =

Korean rocky chive

Scientific classification
- Kingdom: Plantae
- Clade: Tracheophytes
- Clade: Angiosperms
- Clade: Monocots
- Order: Asparagales
- Family: Amaryllidaceae
- Subfamily: Allioideae
- Genus: Allium
- Subgenus: A. subg. Reticulatobulbosa
- Species: A. koreanum

Binomial name
- Allium koreanum H.J.Choi & B.U.Oh

Synonyms
- Synonymy: Allium deltoidefistulosum S.O.Yu, S.Lee & W.T.Lee; Allium japonicum Regel; Allium komarovianum Vved.; Allium ophiopogon H.Lév.; Allium sacculiferum var. viviparum Satake; Allium yuchuanii Y.Z.Zhao & J.Y.Chao

Species of flowering plant

Allium koreanum, the Korean rocky chive, is a species of Allium endemic to the Korean Peninsula.

It has three to six leaves that are 20–54 cm (7.9–21.3 in) long and 2–7.4 cm (0.79–2.91 in) wide, and a sheath that is 7.6–22.4 cm (3.0–8.8 in) long. The pyxidium is obtuse, triangular and solid. Purple-red flowers bloom in August to November; 74 to 197 flowers form an umbel at the end of a 10–22.2 mm (0.39–0.87 in) long flower stalk. The bract is broadovate, with a caudate end. Perianth lobes are broadoval and 3.8–7.2 cm (1.5–2.8 in) long with a round end and green midrib on the underside.
