= Allium maowenense =

茂汶薤 mao wen xie

Scientific classification
- Kingdom: Plantae
- Clade: Tracheophytes
- Clade: Angiosperms
- Clade: Monocots
- Order: Asparagales
- Family: Amaryllidaceae
- Subfamily: Allioideae
- Genus: Allium
- Subgenus: A. subg. Polyprason
- Species: A. maowenense

Binomial name
- Allium maowenense J.M. Xu

Species of plant

Allium maowenense is a plant species endemic to the Sichuan region of China. It grows there at elevations of 1100–1500 m.

Allium maowenense has egg-shaped bulbs up to 2 cm in diameter. Scape is up to 60 cm tall. Leaves are hollow, tubular, shorter than the scape. Umbels are spherical, packed with many flowers; tepals white with pink or green midveins.
