= Allium negevense =

Scientific classification
- Kingdom: Plantae
- Clade: Tracheophytes
- Clade: Angiosperms
- Clade: Monocots
- Order: Asparagales
- Family: Amaryllidaceae
- Subfamily: Allioideae
- Genus: Allium
- Species: A. negevense

Binomial name
- Allium negevense Kollmann

Species of flowering plant

Allium negevense is a plant species found in Israel and Palestine. It is a small plant adapted to life in the Negev Desert. It umbel contains only a few white flowers.
