= Allium alabasicum =

鄂尔多斯韭 e er duo si jiu

Scientific classification
- Kingdom: Plantae
- Clade: Tracheophytes
- Clade: Angiosperms
- Clade: Monocots
- Order: Asparagales
- Family: Amaryllidaceae
- Subfamily: Allioideae
- Genus: Allium
- Species: A. alabasicum

Binomial name
- Allium alabasicum Zhao, Yi-zhi

Species of flowering plant

Allium alabasicum is a species of onion native to Nei Mongol (Inner Mongolia) in China.

Allium alabasicum produces narrow, cylindrical bulbs. Scapes are usually round in cross-section, though sometimes with two angles; they are short, rarely more than 5 cm tall. Umbel generally has only 4 or 5 flowers. Tepals are purplish-red, up to 4 mm long. Ovary is round to egg-shaped. Stamens are shorter than the tepals.
