= Allium hintoniorum =

Scientific classification
- Kingdom: Plantae
- Clade: Tracheophytes
- Clade: Angiosperms
- Clade: Monocots
- Order: Asparagales
- Family: Amaryllidaceae
- Subfamily: Allioideae
- Genus: Allium
- Species: A. hintoniorum

Binomial name
- Allium hintoniorum B.L.Turner

Species of flowering plant

Allium hintoniorum is a plant species native to the State of Nuevo León in northeastern Mexico.

The specific epithet hintoniorum is grammatically in a plural form, as the plant is named in honor of British-born botanist George Boole Hinton (1882-1943), his son Jaime, and his grandson George.
