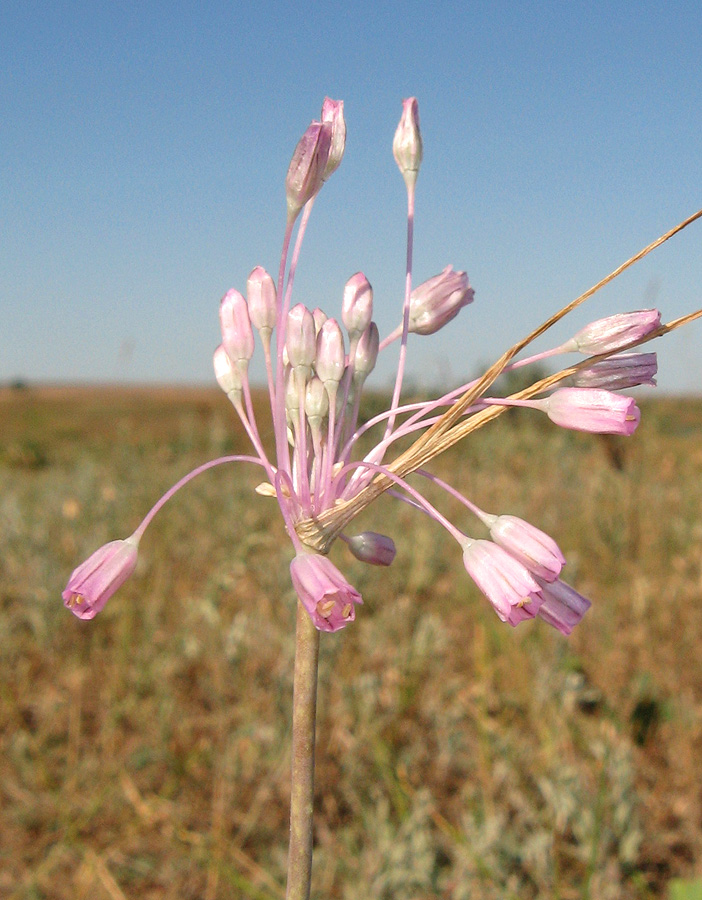
- Flowerhead

Scientific classification
- Kingdom: Plantae
- Clade: Embryophytes
- Clade: Tracheophytes
- Clade: Angiosperms
- Clade: Monocots
- Order: Asparagales
- Family: Amaryllidaceae
- Subfamily: Allioideae
- Genus: Allium
- Species: A. praescissum

Binomial name
- Allium praescissum Rchb.

= Allium praescissum =

Species of flowering plant

Allium praescissum is a species of flowering plant in the family Amaryllidaceae. It is native to Ukraine east of the Dnieper River, Crimea, European Russia, and the Altai. A bulbous geophyte, it is a halophyte. Its chromosome count is 2n = 16.
