= Allium siphonanthum =

管花韭 guan hua jiu

Scientific classification
- Kingdom: Plantae
- Clade: Tracheophytes
- Clade: Angiosperms
- Clade: Monocots
- Order: Asparagales
- Family: Amaryllidaceae
- Subfamily: Allioideae
- Genus: Allium
- Species: A. siphonanthum

Binomial name
- Allium siphonanthum Xu, Jie Mei

Species of plant

Allium siphonanthum is a plant species endemic to Yunnan Province in southern China. It grows on hillsides at an elevation of approximately 2800 m.

Allium siphonanthum has bulbs up to 15 mm across. Scape is up to 60 cm tall, round in cross-section. Leaves are long and very narrow, about the same length as the scape but only about 3 mm across, often drooping under its own weight. Umbel is spherical, with a dense cluster of many reddish-purple flowers.
