= Allium elmaliense =

Scientific classification
- Kingdom: Plantae
- Clade: Tracheophytes
- Clade: Angiosperms
- Clade: Monocots
- Order: Asparagales
- Family: Amaryllidaceae
- Subfamily: Allioideae
- Genus: Allium
- Species: A. elmaliense

Binomial name
- Allium elmaliense Deniz & Sümbül

Species of flowering plant

Allium elmaliense is a species of onion endemic to Antalya Province in southwestern Turkey. It has spherical to egg-shaped bulbs up to 3 cm in diameter. Stipe is up to 30 cm tall. Flowers are fragrant; tepals are white with green midveins.
