= Allium aciphyllum =

针叶韭 zhen ye jiu

Scientific classification
- Kingdom: Plantae
- Clade: Tracheophytes
- Clade: Angiosperms
- Clade: Monocots
- Order: Asparagales
- Family: Amaryllidaceae
- Subfamily: Allioideae
- Genus: Allium
- Species: A. aciphyllum

Binomial name
- Allium aciphyllum Xu, Jie Mei

Species of plant

Allium aciphyllum, cammon name 针叶韭 zhen ye jiu, is a plant species native to Sichuan Province in China. It is found on slopes at elevations of 2000–2100 m.

Allium aciphyllum produces egg-shaped bulbs up to 10 mm in diameter. Scape is round in cross-section, up to 25 cm long, covered with leaf sheaths in lower portion. Leaves are about the same length as the scape. Flowers are pink.
