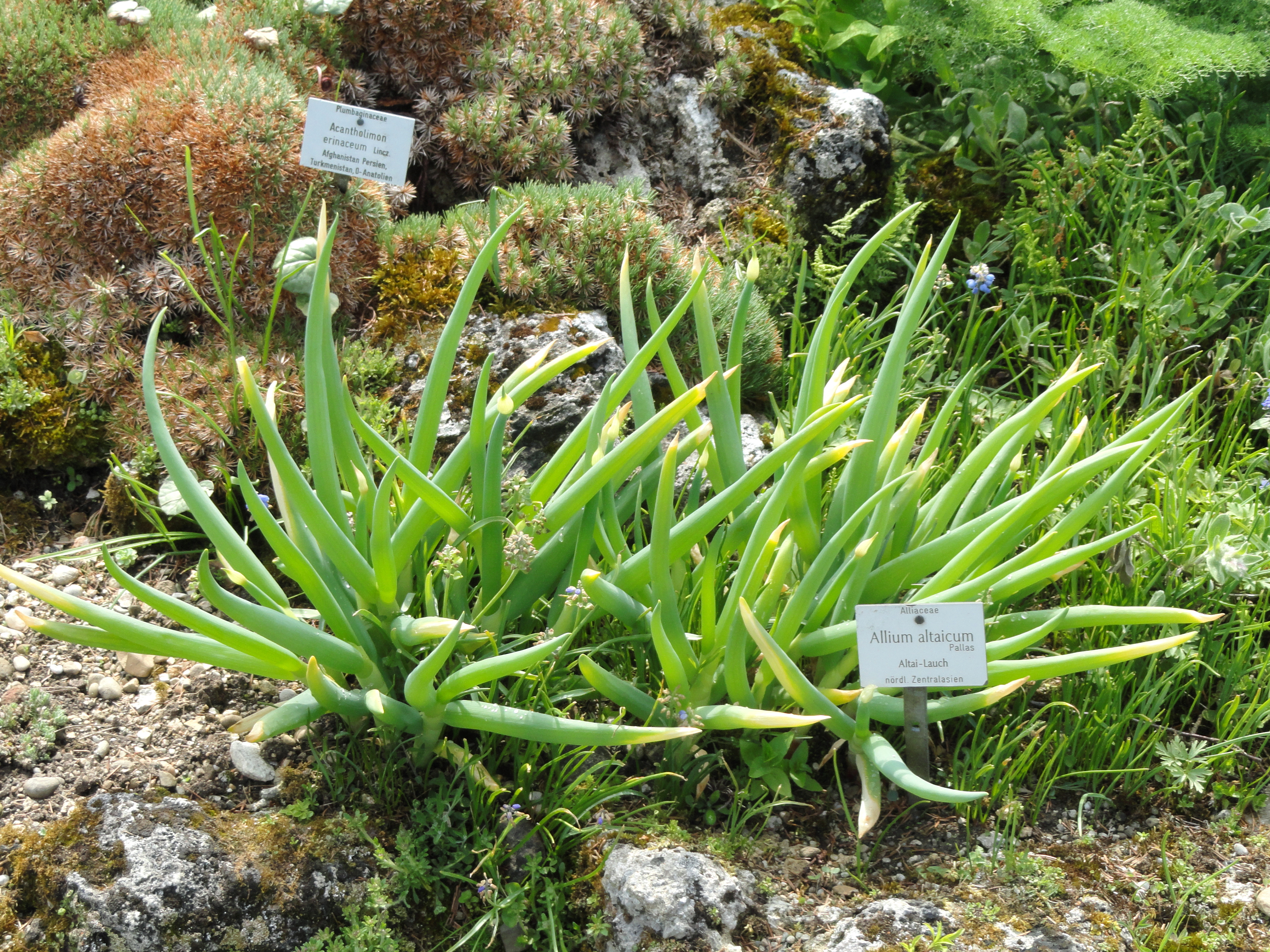

Scientific classification
- Kingdom: Plantae
- Clade: Tracheophytes
- Clade: Angiosperms
- Clade: Monocots
- Order: Asparagales
- Family: Amaryllidaceae
- Subfamily: Allioideae
- Genus: Allium
- Subgenus: A. subg. Cepa
- Species: A. altaicum

Binomial name
- Allium altaicum Pall.

Synonyms
- Allium ceratophyllum Besser ex Schult. & Schult.f.; Allium microbulbum Prokh.; Allium sapidissimum R.Hedw.; Allium saxatile Pall. 1766 superfluous name, also homonym not M.Bieb. 1798

= Allium altaicum =

Species of flowering plant

Allium altaicum is a species of onion native to Asiatic Russia (Altay, Buryatiya, Zabaykalsky Krai, Irkutsk, Tuva, Amur Oblast), Mongolia, Kazakhstan and northern China (Inner Mongolia, Heilongjiang and Xinjiang).

== Description ==
Allium altaicum produces narrowly egg-shaped bulbs up to 4 cm (1 1/2 inches) in diameter. Scape is round in cross-section, up to 100 cm (39 inches) tall. Leaves are round, up to 50 cm (20 inches) long. Flowers are pale yellow, up to 20 mm (13/16 inch) across. Ovary is egg-shaped; stamens longer than the tepals.
