= Allium eusperma =

真籽薤 zhen zi xie

Scientific classification
- Kingdom: Plantae
- Clade: Tracheophytes
- Clade: Angiosperms
- Clade: Monocots
- Order: Asparagales
- Family: Amaryllidaceae
- Subfamily: Allioideae
- Genus: Allium
- Species: A. eusperma

Binomial name
- Allium eusperma Airy Shaw

Species of plant

Allium eusperma is a plant species native to the provinces of Sichuan and Yunnan in southern China. It grows on slopes and along the edges of forests at elevations of 2000–3000 m.

Allium eusperma produces round to egg-shaped bulbs up to 2 cm across. Scape is up to 60 cm tall, round in cross-section. Leaves are generally tubular, almost as long as the scapes. Flowers are pink to pale reddish-purple.
