= Allium sairamense =

Scientific classification
- Kingdom: Plantae
- Clade: Tracheophytes
- Clade: Angiosperms
- Clade: Monocots
- Order: Asparagales
- Family: Amaryllidaceae
- Subfamily: Allioideae
- Genus: Allium
- Species: A. sairamense

Binomial name
- Allium sairamense Regel

Species of plant

Allium sairamense is a plant species native to Xinjiang and Kazakhstan. It grows in Abies forests at elevations of 2400–3400 m.

Allium sairamense produces one round bulb up to 15 mm in diameter. Scape is up to 40 cm tall, round in cross-section. Leaves are tubular, shorter than the scape. Umbel has many purple flowers crowded together.
