= Allium guanxianense =

灌县韭 guan xian jiu

Scientific classification
- Kingdom: Plantae
- Clade: Tracheophytes
- Clade: Angiosperms
- Clade: Monocots
- Order: Asparagales
- Family: Amaryllidaceae
- Subfamily: Allioideae
- Genus: Allium
- Species: A. guanxianense

Binomial name
- Allium guanxianense Xu, Jie Mei

Species of plant

Allium guanxianense is a plant species endemic to Sichuan in China. It is found on damp slopes at elevations of 1,800–2,000 m (5,900–6,600 ft).

Allium guanxianense has thick fleshy roots but thin bulbs rarely more than 10 mm (0.39 in) across. Scapes are up to 60 cm (24 in) tall, round in cross-section. Leaves are flat, narrowly oblanceolate, shorter than the scape and 2–3 cm (0.79–1.18 in) wide. Umbel is spherical, with white flowers.
