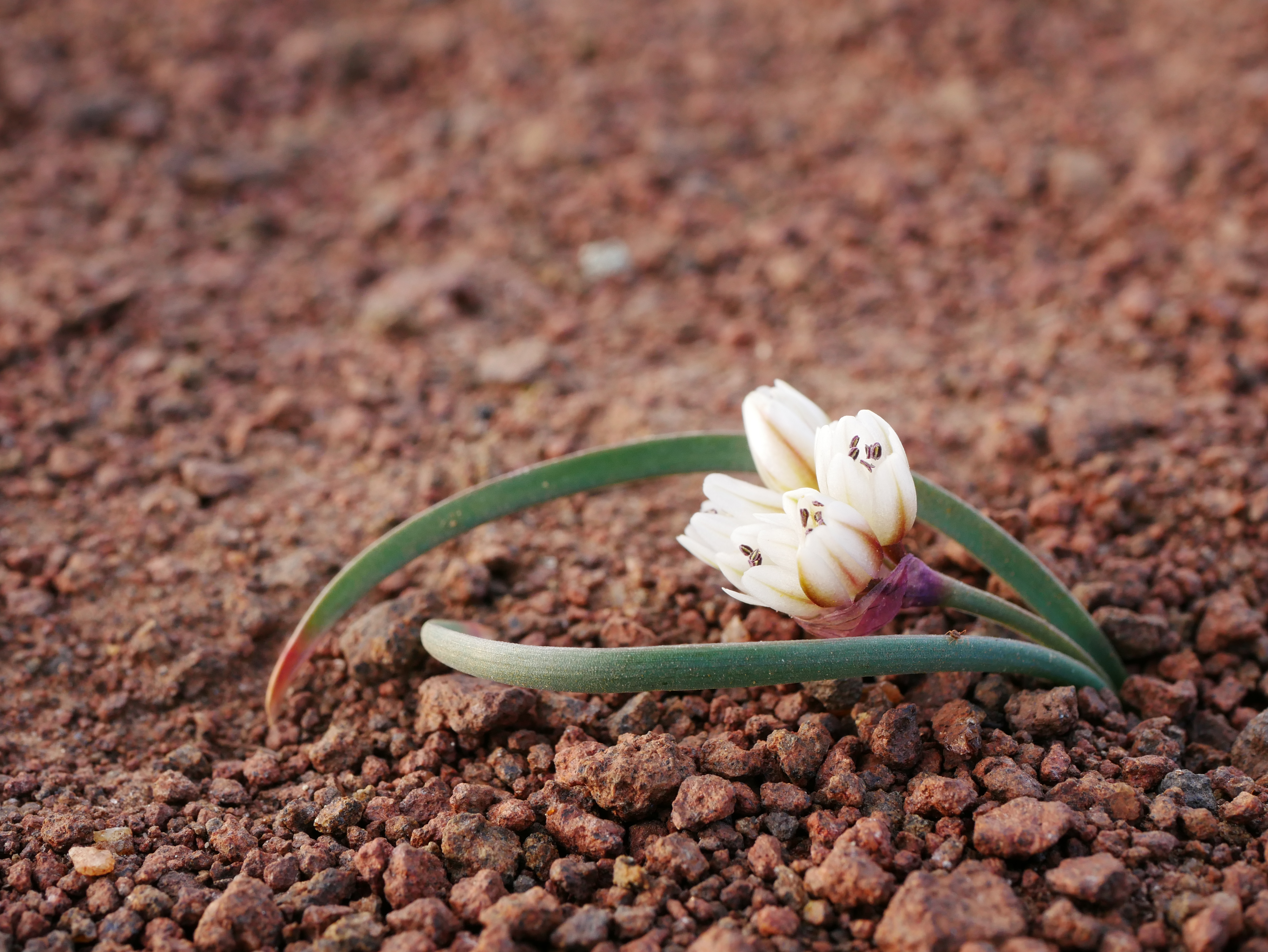

Conservation status
- Imperiled (NatureServe)

Scientific classification
- Kingdom: Plantae
- Clade: Tracheophytes
- Clade: Angiosperms
- Clade: Monocots
- Order: Asparagales
- Family: Amaryllidaceae
- Subfamily: Allioideae
- Genus: Allium
- Species: A. scilloides

Binomial name
- Allium scilloides Douglas ex S. Wats.

Synonyms
- Allium fragile A.Nelson

= Allium scilloides =

Fragile onion

Species of flowering plant

Allium scilloides, called the fragile onion, is a plant species endemic to the US State of Washington. It has been reported from only 4 counties, all on the eastern side of the Cascade Range: Klickitat, Kittitas, Yakima and Grant. It grows on barren, gravelly or rocky slopes at elevations of 300–1300 m. The species is sometimes cultivated in other regions as an ornamental.

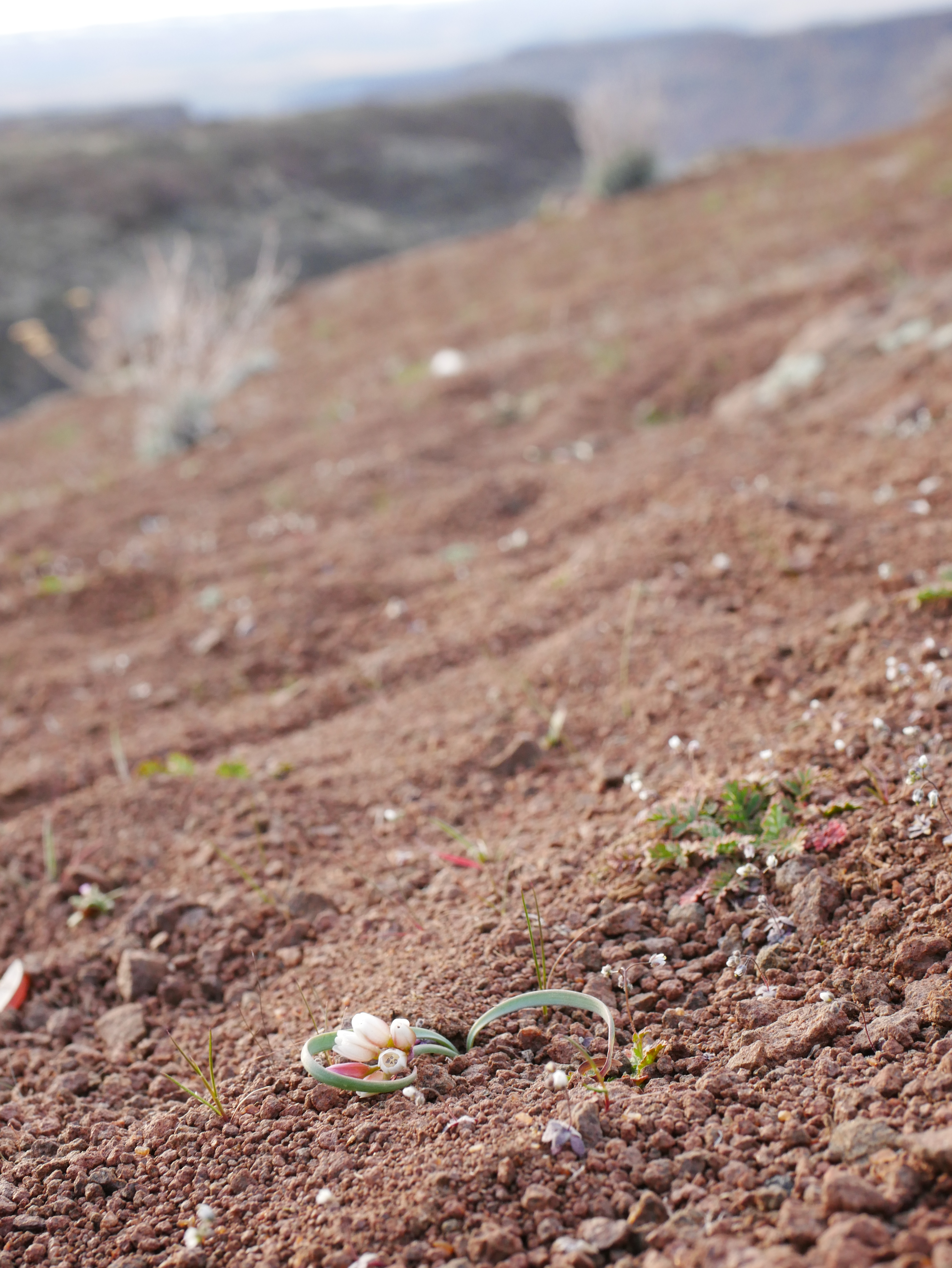
Allium scilloides growing on dry basalt flats, Douglas County Washington

== Description ==
Allium scilloides produces bulbs along an underground rhizome, each bulb round to egg-shaped, up to 2 cm across. There are usually two thick flattened leaves that curl near the ends and are often nearly prostrate on the ground. Flowers are bell-shaped, about 7 mm across; tepals white, pink or purplish with green midribs; anthers purple; pollen white to gray. Flower buds are often dark red to dark pink before opening.

== Gallery ==
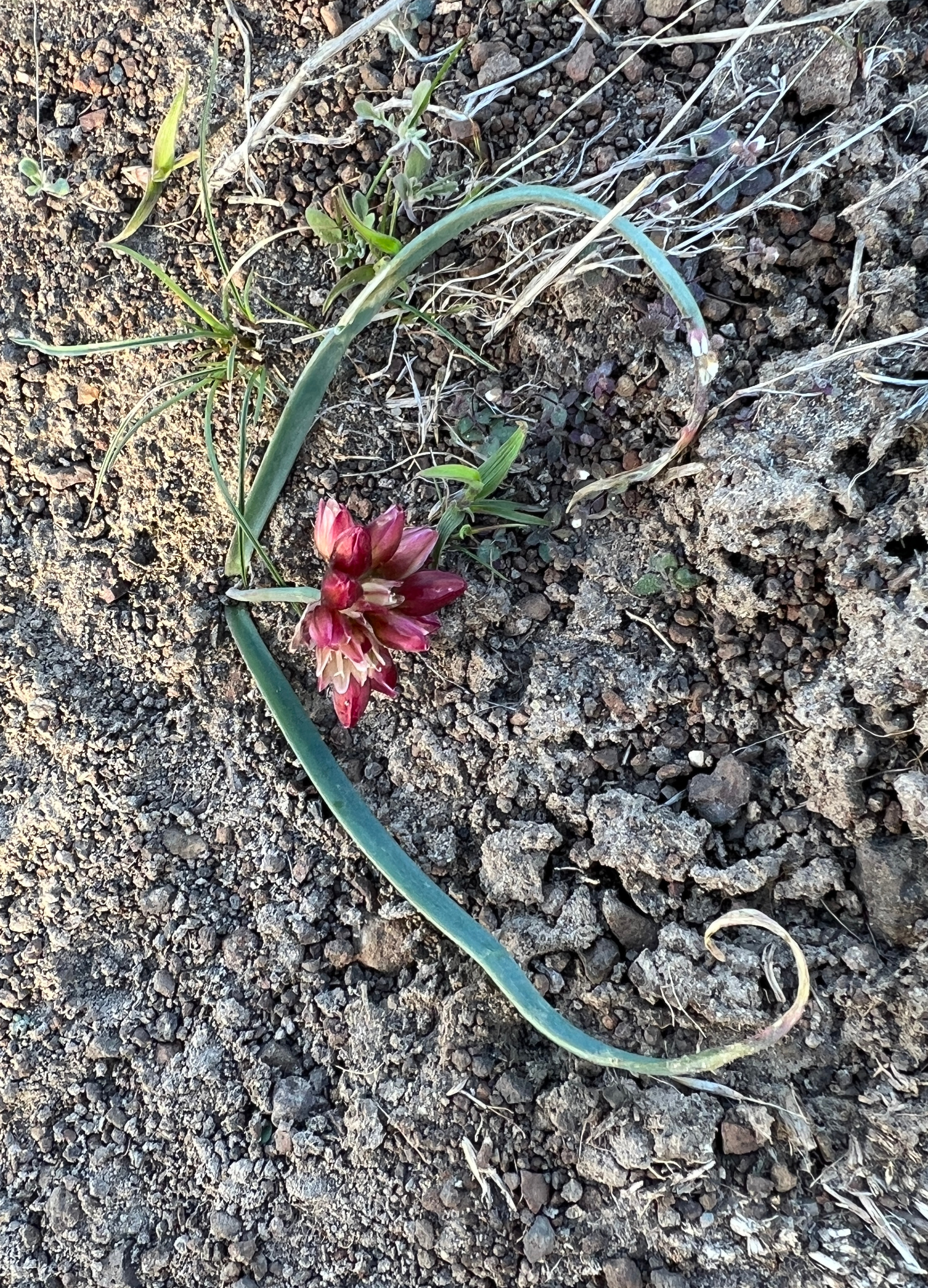
Growing on gravel

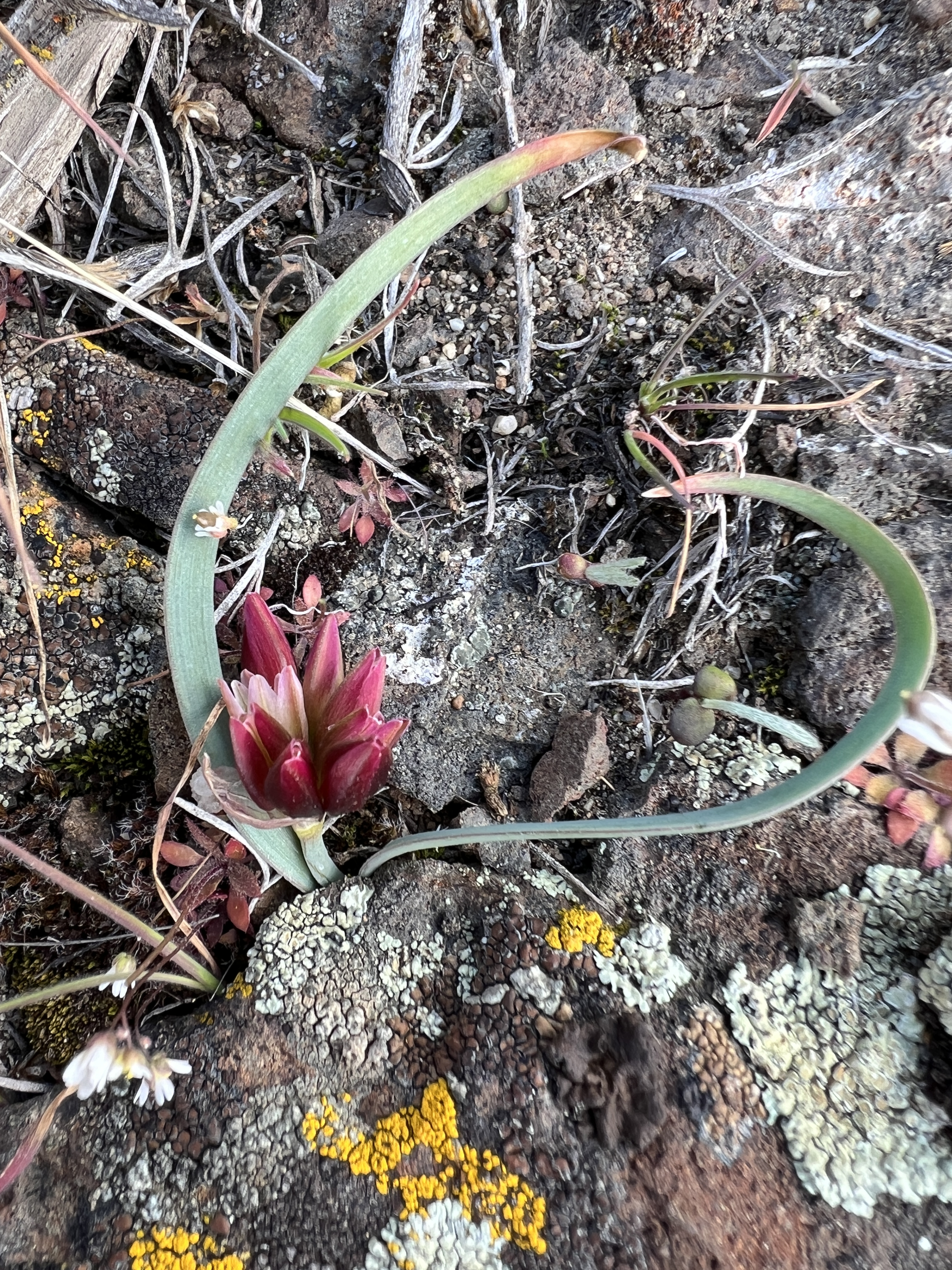
Growing on rocky soil
