= Allium albotunicatum =

Scientific classification
- Kingdom: Plantae
- Clade: Tracheophytes
- Clade: Angiosperms
- Clade: Monocots
- Order: Asparagales
- Family: Amaryllidaceae
- Subfamily: Allioideae
- Genus: Allium
- Species: A. albotunicatum

Binomial name
- Allium albotunicatum O.Schwarz

Species of flowering plant

Allium albotunicatum is a plant species found in Israel, Turkey, Syria and Lebanon. It is a bulb-forming perennial with greenish-brown flowers.
