= Allium grisellum =

灰皮薤 hui pi xie

Scientific classification
- Kingdom: Plantae
- Clade: Tracheophytes
- Clade: Angiosperms
- Clade: Monocots
- Order: Asparagales
- Family: Amaryllidaceae
- Subfamily: Allioideae
- Genus: Allium
- Species: A. grisellum

Binomial name
- Allium grisellum Xu, Jie Mei

Species of plant

Allium grisellum is a plant species endemic to Xinjiang. It is known from one location in a meadow near Toksun Xian, southeast of Urumqi, at an elevation of about 300 m.

Allium grisellum forms clumps of egg-shaped bulbs about 10 mm across. Scapes are up to 20 cm tall, round in cross-section. Leaves narrow, about as long as the scape but only 10–15 mm wide. Umbels have only a few flowers; tepals white with a purple midvein.
