= Allium caesioides =

Scientific classification
- Kingdom: Plantae
- Clade: Tracheophytes
- Clade: Angiosperms
- Clade: Monocots
- Order: Asparagales
- Family: Amaryllidaceae
- Subfamily: Allioideae
- Genus: Allium
- Species: A. caesioides

Binomial name
- Allium caesioides Wendelbo

Synonyms
- Allium kachrooi G.Singh

Species of plant

Allium caesioides is a plant species found in the high mountains of India, Pakistan, Tajikistan and Afghanistan. It has an egg-shaped bulb about 10 cm across, a scape up to 30 cm tall, hair-like leaves, and purple flowers.
