= Allium dentigerum =

短齿韭 duan chi jiu

Scientific classification
- Kingdom: Plantae
- Clade: Tracheophytes
- Clade: Angiosperms
- Clade: Monocots
- Order: Asparagales
- Family: Amaryllidaceae
- Subfamily: Allioideae
- Genus: Allium
- Species: A. dentigerum

Binomial name
- Allium dentigerum Prokh.

Species of plant

Allium dentigerum is a plant species native to Gansu and Shaanxi Provinces in China. It grows on slopes and in pastures at elevations of 1500–2500 m.

Allium dentigerum has narrow, cylindrical bulbs up to 6 mm across. Scapes are up to 35 cm long, round in cross-section. Leaves are very narrow, usually about half as long as the scapes. Flowers are reddish-purple.
