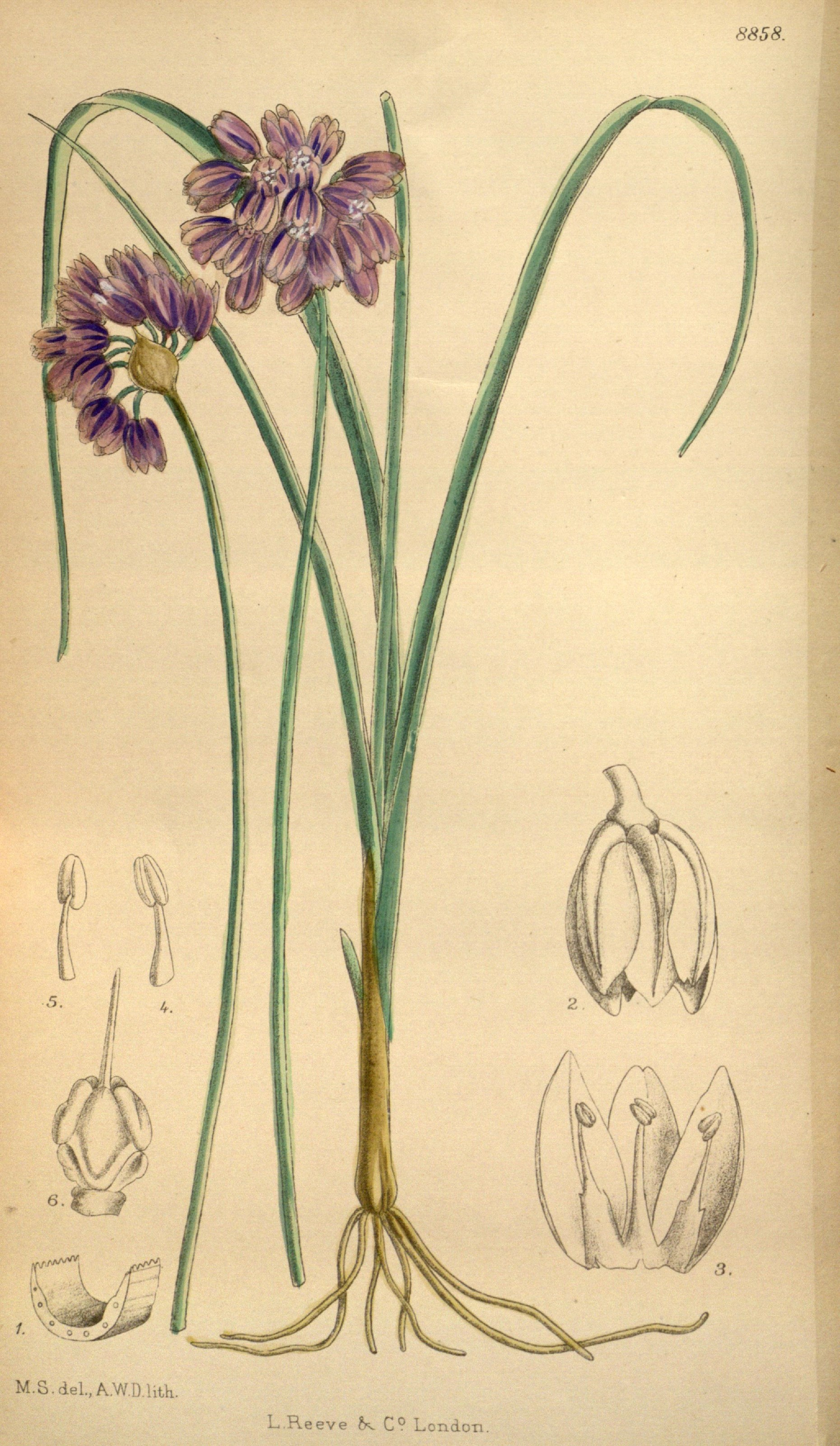

Scientific classification
- Kingdom: Plantae
- Clade: Tracheophytes
- Clade: Angiosperms
- Clade: Monocots
- Order: Asparagales
- Family: Amaryllidaceae
- Subfamily: Allioideae
- Genus: Allium
- Subgenus: A. subg. Reticulatobulbosa
- Species: A. sikkimense

Binomial name
- Allium sikkimense Baker

Synonyms
- Allium cyaneum var. brachystemon Regel; Allium kansuense Regel; Allium tibeticum Rendle

= Allium sikkimense =

Sikkim onion blue-flowered onion 高山韭 gao shan jiu

Species of plant

Allium sikkimense is a plant species native to Sikkim, Tibet, Bhutan, Nepal, India and parts of China (Gansu, Ningxia, Qinghai, Shaanxi, Sichuan, Xizang, Yunnan). It grows in meadows and on the edges of forests at elevations of 2400–5000 m. The species is cultivated as an ornamental in other regions because of its strikingly beautiful blue flowers. It is used medicinally in the Sikkim Eastern Himalayas.

Allium sikkimense has a cluster of narrow bulbs generally less than 5 mm in diameter. Scape is up to 40 cm tall. Leaves are flat, narrow, shorter than the scape, up to 5 mm wide. Umbel is a densely crowded hemisphere of blue flowers.
