= Allium kingdonii =

钟花韭 zhong hua jiu

Scientific classification
- Kingdom: Plantae
- Clade: Tracheophytes
- Clade: Angiosperms
- Clade: Monocots
- Order: Asparagales
- Family: Amaryllidaceae
- Subfamily: Allioideae
- Genus: Allium
- Species: A. kingdonii

Binomial name
- Allium kingdonii Stearn

Species of flowering plant

Allium kingdonii is a rare species of wild onion endemic to southeastern Tibet. It grows at elevations of 4,500–5,000 m (14,800–16,400 ft).

Allium kingdonii generally produces one narrow cylindrical bulb rarely more than 6 mm (0.24 in) across. Scape is up to 30 cm tall. Leaves are flat, narrow, shorter than the scape. Umbels have a few reddish-purple flowers.
