= Allium stocksianum =

Scientific classification
- Kingdom: Plantae
- Clade: Tracheophytes
- Clade: Angiosperms
- Clade: Monocots
- Order: Asparagales
- Family: Amaryllidaceae
- Subfamily: Allioideae
- Genus: Allium
- Species: A. stocksianum

Binomial name
- Allium stocksianum Boiss.

Synonyms
- Allium himalayense Regel

Species of plant

Allium stocksianum is a species of flowering plant in the Amaryllidaceae family. It is native to Pakistan, Afghanistan and Iran. It is a perennial herb up to 15 cm tall, with a bulb up to 20 mm across. Umbels are hemispherical, up to 5 cm across, with pink to purple flowers.
