= Allium longicollum =

Scientific classification
- Kingdom: Plantae
- Clade: Tracheophytes
- Clade: Angiosperms
- Clade: Monocots
- Order: Asparagales
- Family: Amaryllidaceae
- Subfamily: Allioideae
- Genus: Allium
- Species: A. longicollum

Binomial name
- Allium longicollum Wendelbo

Species of plant

Allium longicollum is a plant species found in Pakistan and Afghanistan. It is a perennial herb up to 35 cm tall, with a hemispherical umbel of white flowers.
