= Allium yuanum =

齿被韭 chi bei jiu

Scientific classification
- Kingdom: Plantae
- Clade: Tracheophytes
- Clade: Angiosperms
- Clade: Monocots
- Order: Asparagales
- Family: Amaryllidaceae
- Subfamily: Allioideae
- Genus: Allium
- Species: A. yuanum

Binomial name
- Allium yuanum F.T. Wang & T. Tang

Species of plant

Allium yuanum is a plant species endemic to the Sichuan region in southern China.

Allium yuanum has a cluster of narrow bulbs usually no more than 4 mm across. Scape is up to 60 cm tall, round in cross-section. Leaves about 3 mm wide, about the same length as the scape. Flowers are blue.
