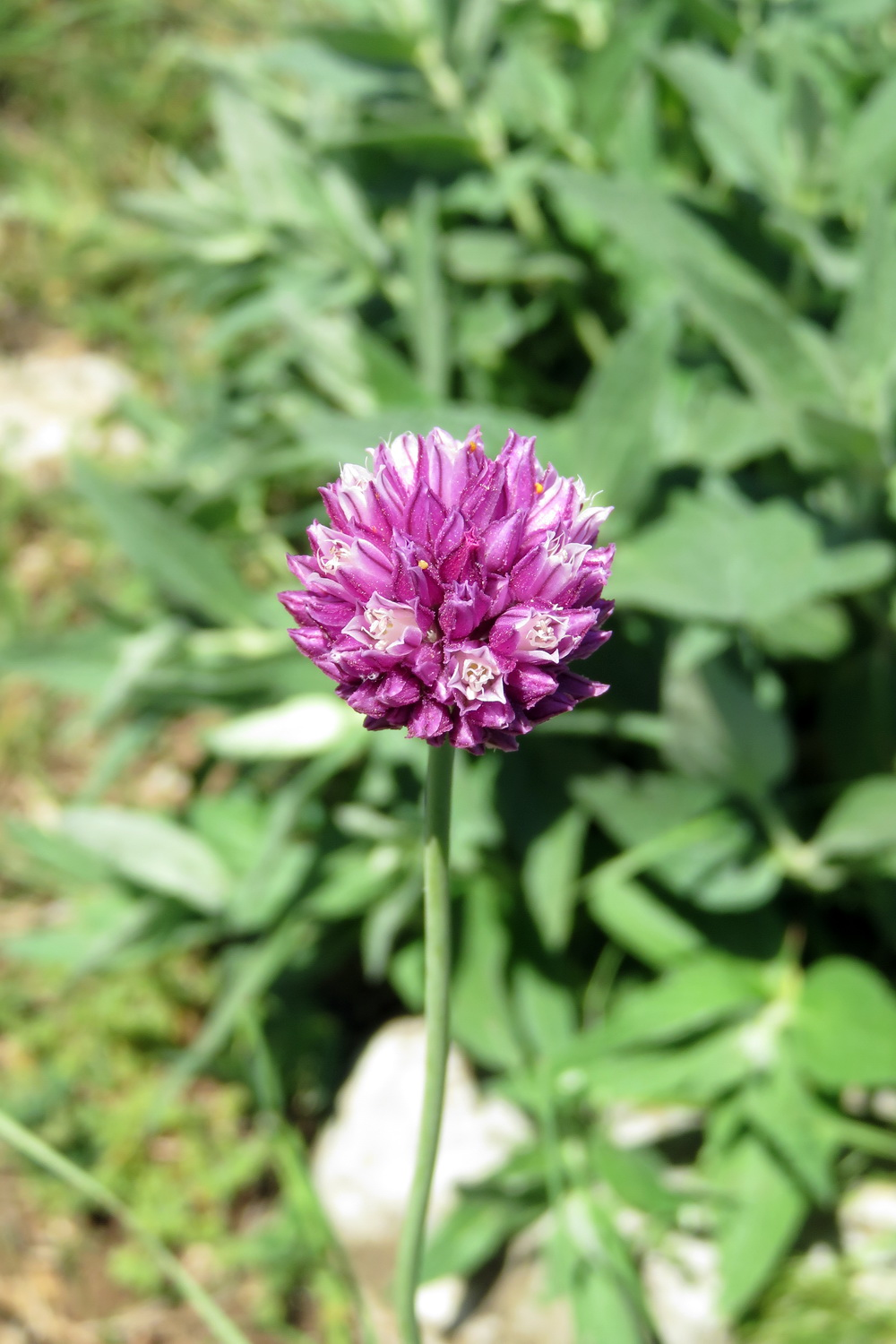

Scientific classification
- Kingdom: Plantae
- Clade: Tracheophytes
- Clade: Angiosperms
- Clade: Monocots
- Order: Asparagales
- Family: Amaryllidaceae
- Subfamily: Allioideae
- Genus: Allium
- Species: A. nathaliae

Binomial name
- Allium nathaliae Seregin

Synonyms
- Allium nathaliae var. tepekermensis Seregin

= Allium nathaliae =

Species of flowering plant

Allium nathaliae is a species of wild onion endemic to the Crimean Peninsula.
