= Allium xichuanense =

西川韭 xi chuan jiu

Scientific classification
- Kingdom: Plantae
- Clade: Tracheophytes
- Clade: Angiosperms
- Clade: Monocots
- Order: Asparagales
- Family: Amaryllidaceae
- Subfamily: Allioideae
- Genus: Allium
- Subgenus: A. subg. Polyprason
- Species: A. xichuanense

Binomial name
- Allium xichuanense Xu, Jie Mei

Species of plant

Allium xichuanense is a plant species native to the Sichuan and Yunnan regions in southern China. It grows at elevations of 3100–4400 m.

Allium xichuanense has a single egg-shaped bulb up to 12 mm in diameter. Scape it up to 40 cm tall, round in cross-section. Leaves are tubular, up to 4 mm in diameter, about the same length as the scape. Umbel spherical, densely crowded with many yellow flowers.
