= Allium abbasii =

Scientific classification
- Kingdom: Plantae
- Clade: Tracheophytes
- Clade: Angiosperms
- Clade: Monocots
- Order: Asparagales
- Family: Amaryllidaceae
- Subfamily: Allioideae
- Genus: Allium
- Species: A. abbasii

Binomial name
- Allium abbasii R.M.Fritsch

Species of flowering plant

Allium abbasii is a species of onion native to Iran.
