= Allium paepalanthoides =

天蒜 tian suan

Scientific classification
- Kingdom: Plantae
- Clade: Tracheophytes
- Clade: Angiosperms
- Clade: Monocots
- Order: Asparagales
- Family: Amaryllidaceae
- Subfamily: Allioideae
- Genus: Allium
- Species: A. paepalanthoides

Binomial name
- Allium paepalanthoides Airy Shaw

Synonyms
- Allium albostellerianum F.T.Wang & Tang

Species of plant

Allium paepalanthoides is a plant species native to China. It has been reported from Henan, Inner Mongolia, Shaanxi, Shanxi and Sichuan at elevations of 1400–2000 m.

Allium paepalanthoides produces a single narrow bulb up to 15 mm across. Scape is up to 50 cm tall. Leaves lance-linear, tapering at the tip, up to 25 mm wide at the widest point. Umbels with many flowers; tepals white with green midveins.
