= Allium acidoides =

Scientific classification
- Kingdom: Plantae
- Clade: Tracheophytes
- Clade: Angiosperms
- Clade: Monocots
- Order: Asparagales
- Family: Amaryllidaceae
- Subfamily: Allioideae
- Genus: Allium
- Species: A. acidoides

Binomial name
- Allium acidoides Stearn

Species of perennial plant

Allium acidoides is a species of perennial plant in the family of Amaryllidaceae. It is herbaceous.

== Habitat ==
Allium acidoides is native to Myanmar and grows mainly in the subtropical biome.

== Cultivation ==
This species of plant grows from bulbs and thrives in lightweight, well-drained soil.
