= Allium hirtovaginatum =

Scientific classification
- Kingdom: Plantae
- Clade: Tracheophytes
- Clade: Angiosperms
- Clade: Monocots
- Order: Asparagales
- Family: Amaryllidaceae
- Subfamily: Allioideae
- Genus: Allium
- Species: A. hirtovaginatum

Binomial name
- Allium hirtovaginatum Kunth (1843)

Subspecies
- Allium hirtovaginatum subsp. hirtovaginatum; Allium hirtovaginatum subsp. samium Brullo, Pavone & Salmeri

Synonyms
- Allium cupani subsp. anatolicum Stearn; Allium cupani var. hirtovaginatum (Kunth) Halácsy; Allium cupani f. hirtovaginatum (Kunth) Vindt; Allium cupani subsp. hirtovaginatum (Kunth) Stearn; Allium moschatum d'Urv. 1822, illegitimate homonym not L. 1753; Allium pisidicum Boiss. & Heldr.

Species of flowering plant

Allium hirtovaginatum is a species of wild onion native to the Mediterranean region, ranging from Morocco, Algeria, and Tunisia to the Balearic Islands, Italy, southern Greece, southern and western Turkey, and Cyprus.

Allium hirtovaginatum produces an egg-shaped bulb. Scape is up to 50 cm, round in cross-section, thin and flexible. Leaves are very thin and hair-like. Umbel has only a few flowers. Flowers bell-shaped, the tepals white with dark purple midvein. Ovary is covered with long hairs.

Two subspecies are accepted.

- Allium hirtovaginatum subsp. hirtovaginatum – northwestern Africa, Balearic Islands, Italy, southern Greece, southern and western Turkey, and Cyprus
- Allium hirtovaginatum subsp. samium Brullo, Pavone & Salmeri – Samos in the eastern Aegean
