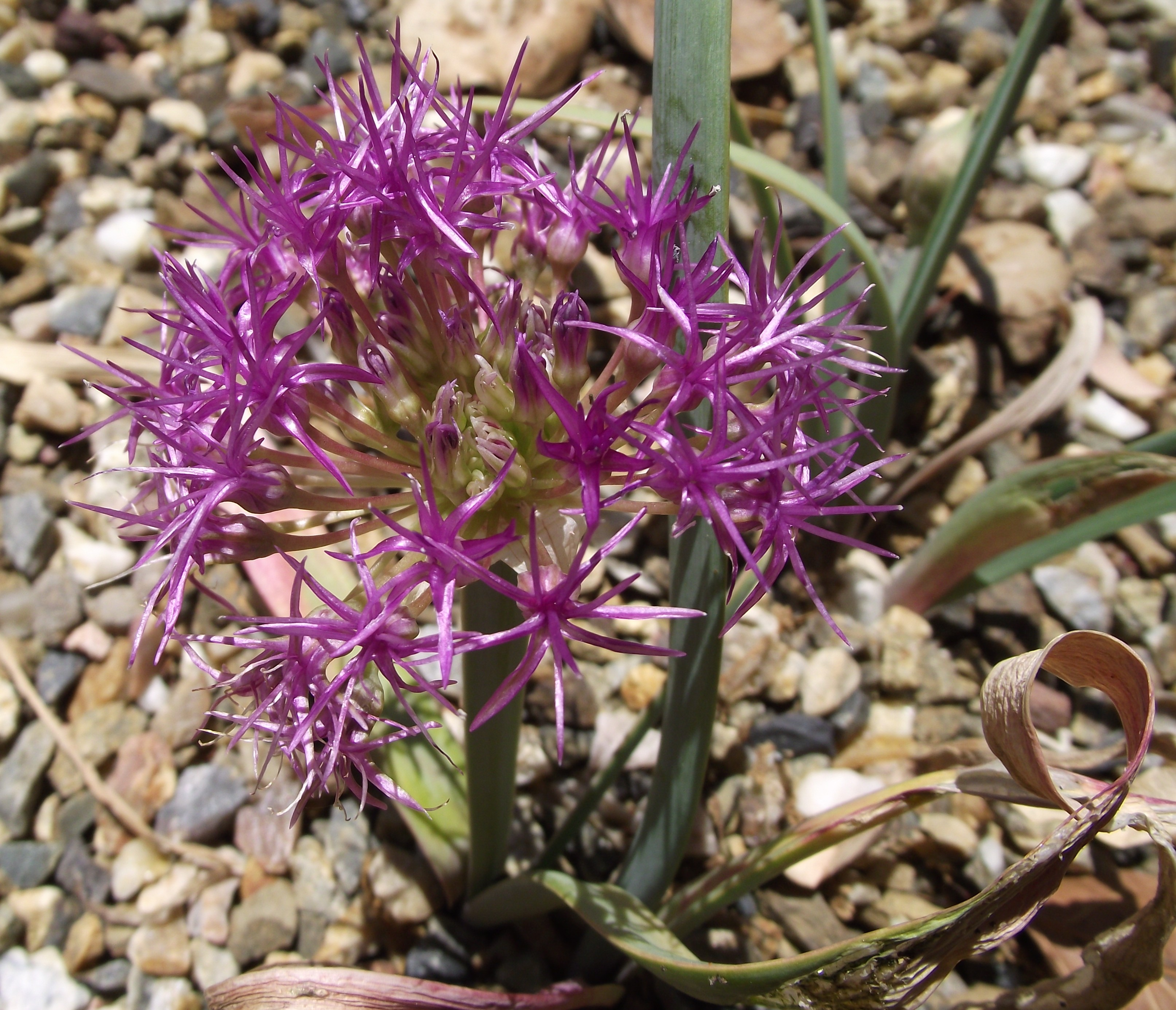

Conservation status
- Apparently Secure (NatureServe)

Scientific classification
- Kingdom: Plantae
- Clade: Embryophytes
- Clade: Tracheophytes
- Clade: Angiosperms
- Clade: Monocots
- Order: Asparagales
- Family: Amaryllidaceae
- Subfamily: Allioideae
- Genus: Allium
- Species: A. platycaule

Binomial name
- Allium platycaule S.Watson

= Allium platycaule =

Flat-stem onion

North American onion species

Allium platycaule is a species of wild onion known as broadstemmed onion or flat-stem onion. It is native to northeastern California, south-central Oregon (Lake County) and northwestern Nevada (Washoe and Humboldt Counties). It is found on slopes of elevations of 1500–2500 m.

Allium platycaule grows from a gray bulb 2 to 3 cm (3/4 to 1 1/4 in) wide. Scape is thin and strongly flattened, up to 25 cm (9 3/4 in) long but rarely more than 7 mm (1/4 in) across. It may be thicker along the midrib and much narrower along the sides. The long, flat leaves are sickle-shaped. Atop the stem is an umbel which may have as many as 90 flowers in it. Each flower may be up to a centimeter and a half wide but the tepals are quite narrow so as to be almost threadlike. The inflorescence therefore may appear be a dense ball of filaments. The flowers are generally bright pink to magenta with yellow anthers.

== Taxonomy ==
Allium platycaule was named and scientifically described by Sereno Watson in 1879. He placed it in the Allium genus which is classified in the Amaryllidaceae family. The species has no varieties or botanical synonyms.

== Uses ==
The leaves, bulbs, and seeds were utilized as food by the Northern Paiute people.
