= Allium lamondiae =

Scientific classification
- Kingdom: Plantae
- Clade: Tracheophytes
- Clade: Angiosperms
- Clade: Monocots
- Order: Asparagales
- Family: Amaryllidaceae
- Subfamily: Allioideae
- Genus: Allium
- Species: A. lamondiae

Binomial name
- Allium lamondiae Wendelbo

Species of plant

Allium lamondiae is a plant species found in Pakistan, Afghanistan and Iran. It is a perennial herb up to 25 cm tall, with tubular leaves, producing a hemispherical umbel of flowers. Tepals white with reddish-brown midveins.
