= Allium callimischon =

Scientific classification
- Kingdom: Plantae
- Clade: Tracheophytes
- Clade: Angiosperms
- Clade: Monocots
- Order: Asparagales
- Family: Amaryllidaceae
- Subfamily: Allioideae
- Genus: Allium
- Species: A. callimischon

Binomial name
- Allium callimischon Link

Species of flowering plant

Allium callimischon is a plant species native to southwestern Turkey and to southern Greece (including Peloponnese and the Island of Crete). It is grown in other countries as an ornamental because of its attractive flowers.

Allium callimischon is a perennial herb up to 30 cm tall. It has small bulbs and thread-like leaves. Flowers are borne in an umbel, white with thin purple midveins on the tepals.
