= Allium listera =

对叶山葱 dui ye shan cong

Scientific classification
- Kingdom: Plantae
- Clade: Tracheophytes
- Clade: Angiosperms
- Clade: Monocots
- Order: Asparagales
- Family: Amaryllidaceae
- Subfamily: Allioideae
- Genus: Allium
- Species: A. listera

Binomial name
- Allium listera Stearn

Synonyms
- Allium victorialis var. listera (Stearn) J.M. Xu

Species of plant

Allium listera is a species of wild onion endemic to China. It is known from the provinces Anhui, Hebei, Henan, Jilin, Shaanxi, and Shanxi. It grows in forests and pastures at elevations of 600–2000 m.

Allium listera has rather unusual leaves for the genus, the blade elliptic to ovate, up to 12 cm long and 10 cm across. Scape is 80 cm long, round in cross–section. Umbel is spherical with many flowers crowded together. Flowers are white, very pale green or very pale red.
