= Allium alibile =

Scientific classification
- Kingdom: Plantae
- Clade: Tracheophytes
- Clade: Angiosperms
- Clade: Monocots
- Order: Asparagales
- Family: Amaryllidaceae
- Subfamily: Allioideae
- Genus: Allium
- Species: A. alibile

Binomial name
- Allium alibile A.Rich

Species of flowering plant

Allium alibile is a plant species native to Ethiopia, Sudan and Saudi Arabia. It has a round, white bulb. Umbel is dense with many flowers crowded together. Flowers are bell-shaped, rose pink.
