= Allium xiangchengense =

乡城韭 xiang cheng jiu

Scientific classification
- Kingdom: Plantae
- Clade: Tracheophytes
- Clade: Angiosperms
- Clade: Monocots
- Order: Asparagales
- Family: Amaryllidaceae
- Subfamily: Allioideae
- Genus: Allium
- Species: A. xiangchengense

Binomial name
- Allium xiangchengense Xu, Jie Mei

Species of plant

Allium xiangchengense is a plant species endemic to the Sichuan region in southern China. It grows there at an elevation of approximately 3300 m.

Allium xiangchengense has thick, fleshy roots and clumps of narrow bulbs each less than 5 mm across. Scape is up to 30 cm tall, round in cross-section. Leaves are flat, lanceolate, narrowing toward the tip, up to 2 cm across at the widest point, shorter than the scape. Umbel is spherical. Tepals are white, sometimes 2-lobed.
