= Allium longistylum =

Scientific classification
- Kingdom: Plantae
- Clade: Tracheophytes
- Clade: Angiosperms
- Clade: Monocots
- Order: Asparagales
- Family: Amaryllidaceae
- Subfamily: Allioideae
- Genus: Allium
- Species: A. longistylum

Binomial name
- Allium longistylum Baker

Synonyms
- Allium hopeiense Nakai; Allium jeholense Franch.

Species of plant

Allium longistylum, also called riverside chive, is a species of wild onion native to Korea and northern China (Hebei, Inner Mongolia, Shanxi). It grows at elevations of 1500–3000 m.

Allium longistylum has bulbs rarely more than 8 mm across. Scape is up to 50 cm high. Leaves are about the same length as the scape but only 2–3 mm across. Umbels are spherical. Flowers are red or reddish-purple.
