= Allium caespitosum =

疏生韭 shu sheng jiu

Scientific classification
- Kingdom: Plantae
- Clade: Tracheophytes
- Clade: Angiosperms
- Clade: Monocots
- Order: Asparagales
- Family: Amaryllidaceae
- Subfamily: Allioideae
- Genus: Allium
- Subgenus: A. subg. Rhizirideum
- Species: A. caespitosum

Binomial name
- Allium caespitosum Siev. ex Bong. & C.A. Mey.

Species of plant

Allium caespitosum is a plant species native to Xinjiang and Kazakhstan in Central Asia. It grows in desert regions, very often in sandy locales.

Allium caespitosum produces clumps of small bulbs. Scapes are round in cross-section, up to 20 cm tall. Leaves are very narrow, shorter than the scape. Flowers are white or pale pink.
