= Allium consanguineum =

Scientific classification
- Kingdom: Plantae
- Clade: Tracheophytes
- Clade: Angiosperms
- Clade: Monocots
- Order: Asparagales
- Family: Amaryllidaceae
- Subfamily: Allioideae
- Genus: Allium
- Subgenus: A. subg. Polyprason
- Species: A. consanguineum

Binomial name
- Allium consanguineum Kunth

Species of plant

Allium consanguineum is a species of onion found high in the Himalayas of northern Pakistan and northern India. It is a perennial herb up to 35 cm tall, with an egg-shaped bulb. Leaves are flat, narrow. Umbels are hemispherical, densely crowded with many yellow or pink flowers.
