= Allium lachnophyllum =

Scientific classification
- Kingdom: Plantae
- Clade: Tracheophytes
- Clade: Angiosperms
- Clade: Monocots
- Order: Asparagales
- Family: Amaryllidaceae
- Subfamily: Allioideae
- Genus: Allium
- Species: A. lachnophyllum

Binomial name
- Allium lachnophyllum Paine

Species of flowering plant

Allium lachnophyllum is a species of wild onion native to Israel and Palestine. It is a bulb-forming perennial that produces an umbel of flowers.
