= Allium blandum =

白韭 bai jiu

Scientific classification
- Kingdom: Plantae
- Clade: Tracheophytes
- Clade: Angiosperms
- Clade: Monocots
- Order: Asparagales
- Family: Amaryllidaceae
- Subfamily: Allioideae
- Genus: Allium
- Species: A. blandum

Binomial name
- Allium blandum Wall.

Species of flowering plant

Allium blandum is a species of onion native to northern India, Pakistan, Afghanistan, Tajikistan, Nepal and the Xinjiang region of western China. It grows in the mountains at elevations of 3000–5000 m.

Allium blandum produces an egg-shaped bulb up to 2 cm in diameter. Scape is round in cross-section, up to 30 cm tall. Leaves are narrow, flat, up to 20 cm long. Umbel is spherical with many red flowers.
