= Allium diabolense =

devil's onion

Scientific classification
- Kingdom: Plantae
- Clade: Tracheophytes
- Clade: Angiosperms
- Clade: Monocots
- Order: Asparagales
- Family: Amaryllidaceae
- Subfamily: Allioideae
- Genus: Allium
- Species: A. diabolense

Binomial name
- Allium diabolense (Ownbey & Aase) McNeal

Synonyms
- Allium fimbriatum var. diabolense Ownbey & Aase ex Traub

Species of flowering plant

Allium diabolense (serpentine onion or devil's onion) is a species of wild onion endemic to central California in the Coast Ranges and the Transverse Ranges. It grows on serpentine soils at elevations of 500 to 1500 m, from Kern and Ventura Counties north to Stanislaus and Santa Clara Counties.

Allium diabolense grows from a reddish-brown bulb just over a centimeter long. It produces a stem up to 20 centimeters tall and a single leaf, which is longer than the stem. The inflorescence contains up to 50 dark-veined, pink-tinted white flowers. Its anthers and pollen are yellow.
