= Allium yanchiense =

白花薤 bai hua xie

Scientific classification
- Kingdom: Plantae
- Clade: Tracheophytes
- Clade: Angiosperms
- Clade: Monocots
- Order: Asparagales
- Family: Amaryllidaceae
- Subfamily: Allioideae
- Genus: Allium
- Species: A. yanchiense

Binomial name
- Allium yanchiense Xu, Jie Mei

Species of flowering plant

Allium yanchiense is a plant species endemic to China, reported from Gansu, Hebei, Nei Mongol, Ningxia, Qinghai, Shaanxi and Shanxi. It grows at elevations of 1300–2000 m.

Allium yanchiense has clusters of egg-shaped bulbs, each up to 20 mm in diameter. A scape is up to 40 cm long, and round in cross-section. Leaves are tubular, about 2 mm across, shorter than the scape. An umbel is spherical, crowded with many white or pinkish flowers.
