= Allium taishanense =

泰山韭 tai shan jiu

Scientific classification
- Kingdom: Plantae
- Clade: Tracheophytes
- Clade: Angiosperms
- Clade: Monocots
- Order: Asparagales
- Family: Amaryllidaceae
- Subfamily: Allioideae
- Genus: Allium
- Species: A. taishanense

Binomial name
- Allium taishanense Xu, Jie Mei

Species of plant

Allium taishanense is a plant species endemic to the Shandong region of China. It occurs there on hillsides at elevations of 300–600 m.

Allium taishanense has narrow bulbs usually less than 5 mm in diameter. Scape is up to 30 cm tall, 2-angled with small teeth along the angles. Leaves are flat, up to 10 mm wide, tapering at both ends, usually shorter than the scape. Umbel is hemispheric, with many pink or white flowers crowded together.
