= Allium omeiense =

Scientific classification
- Kingdom: Plantae
- Clade: Tracheophytes
- Clade: Angiosperms
- Clade: Monocots
- Order: Asparagales
- Family: Amaryllidaceae
- Subfamily: Allioideae
- Genus: Allium
- Species: A. omeiense

Binomial name
- Allium omeiense Z.Y. Zhu

Species of plant

Allium omeiense is a plant species endemic to Sichuan, China. The people of Emei Shuan grow Allium omeiense as a garden vegetable. It also grows in the wild on slopes and along stream banks.

Allium omeiense has thick, fleshy roots, plus a bulb up to 2 cm in diameter. Scape is up to 70 cm tall, round in cross-section; Leaves is sword-shaped, longer than the scape. Umbel is hemispheric with white flowers.
