= Allium changduense =

昌都韭 chang du jiu

Scientific classification
- Kingdom: Plantae
- Clade: Tracheophytes
- Clade: Angiosperms
- Clade: Monocots
- Order: Asparagales
- Family: Amaryllidaceae
- Subfamily: Allioideae
- Genus: Allium
- Species: A. changduense

Binomial name
- Allium changduense Xu, Jie Mei

Species of plant

Allium changduense is a plant species native to the Chinese provinces of Sichuan and Xizang (Tibet). It grows at elevations of 3200–4500 m.

Allium changduense has narrow, cylindrical bulbs less than 10 mm across. Scapes are up to 20 cm tall, round in cross-section. Leaves are very narrow, shorter than the scape. Umbels are small, with reddish-purple flowers.
