= Allium kurssanovii =

条叶长喙韭 tiao ye chang hui jiu

Scientific classification
- Kingdom: Plantae
- Clade: Tracheophytes
- Clade: Angiosperms
- Clade: Monocots
- Order: Asparagales
- Family: Amaryllidaceae
- Subfamily: Allioideae
- Genus: Allium
- Species: A. kurssanovii

Binomial name
- Allium kurssanovii Popov

Synonyms
- Allium pseudoglobosum Popov ex Gamajun

Species of flowering plant

Allium kurssanovii is a species of wild onion native to Central Asia (Xinjiang, Kazakhstan, and Kyrgyzstan). It grows on cliff faces and other sun-lit locations at elevations of 2200–2700 m.

Allium kurssanovii has a cluster of very long, narrow bulbs up to 15 cm long. Scapes are up to 90 cm tall. Leaves flat, slightly longer than the scape but only 3–4 mm across. Umbel is large and spherical, with many flowers; tepals pink to purplish-red with dark purple midvein.
