= Allium elegantulum =

雅韭 ya jiu

Scientific classification
- Kingdom: Plantae
- Clade: Tracheophytes
- Clade: Angiosperms
- Clade: Monocots
- Order: Asparagales
- Family: Amaryllidaceae
- Subfamily: Allioideae
- Genus: Allium
- Species: A. elegantulum

Binomial name
- Allium elegantulum Kitag.

Species of flowering plant

Allium elegantulum is a species of onions endemic to the province of Liaoning northeastern China. The plant grows on cliffs and in other rocky or sandy places.

Allium elegantulum produces a cluster of narrow bulbs rarely more than 5 mm across. Scapes are up to 20 cm tall, round in cross-section. Tepals are white to pale pink with a darker red midvein.
