= Allium funckiifolium =

玉簪叶山葱 yu zan ye shan cong

Scientific classification
- Kingdom: Plantae
- Clade: Tracheophytes
- Clade: Angiosperms
- Clade: Monocots
- Order: Asparagales
- Family: Amaryllidaceae
- Subfamily: Allioideae
- Genus: Allium
- Species: A. funckiifolium

Binomial name
- Allium funckiifolium Hand.-Mazz

Species of plant

Allium funckiifolium is a plant species from Hubei and Sichuan Provinces in China. It grows in moist locales at elevations of 2200–2300 m.

Allium funckiifolium is unusual in the genus in producing one large, egg-shaped to heart-shaped leaf up to 25 cm long and 16 cm across. Scape is up to 70 cm tall. Umbel is spherical with many white flowers.
