= Allium forrestii =

梭沙韭 suo sha jiu

Scientific classification
- Kingdom: Plantae
- Clade: Tracheophytes
- Clade: Angiosperms
- Clade: Monocots
- Order: Asparagales
- Family: Amaryllidaceae
- Subfamily: Allioideae
- Genus: Allium
- Species: A. forrestii

Binomial name
- Allium forrestii Diels

Species of plant

Allium forrestii is a species of onion native to the Chinese provinces of Sichuan, Tibet and Yunnan. It grows on mountain meadows and slopes at elevations of 2700–4200 m.

Allium forrestii produces a clump of bulbs, each rarely more than 7 mm across. Scapes are purple, up to 30 cm tall, round in cross-section. Leaves are narrow and linear. Umbels are small, with only a few flowers. Flowers are deep purple.
