= Allium chienchuanense =

剑川韭 jian chuan jiu

Scientific classification
- Kingdom: Plantae
- Clade: Embryophytes
- Clade: Tracheophytes
- Clade: Spermatophytes
- Clade: Angiosperms
- Clade: Monocots
- Order: Asparagales
- Family: Amaryllidaceae
- Subfamily: Allioideae
- Genus: Allium
- Species: A. chienchuanense

Binomial name
- Allium chienchuanense Xu, Jie Mei

Species of plant

Allium chienchuanense is a plant species endemic to the province of Yunnan in southern China. It grows on stream banks at elevations of about 3100 m.

Allium chienchuanense produces bulbs up to 3 cm in diameter. Scape is up to 80 cm long, and round in cross-section. Umbel is spherical with many yellow flowers.
