= Allium anacoleum =

Scientific classification
- Kingdom: Plantae
- Clade: Tracheophytes
- Clade: Angiosperms
- Clade: Monocots
- Order: Asparagales
- Family: Amaryllidaceae
- Subfamily: Allioideae
- Genus: Allium
- Species: A. anacoleum

Binomial name
- Allium anacoleum Hand.-Mazz.

Species of flowering plant

Allium anacoleum is a plant species in the amaryllis family and is native to Turkey and Iraq.
