= Allium borszczowii =

Scientific classification
- Kingdom: Plantae
- Clade: Tracheophytes
- Clade: Angiosperms
- Clade: Monocots
- Order: Asparagales
- Family: Amaryllidaceae
- Subfamily: Allioideae
- Genus: Allium
- Species: A. borszczowii

Binomial name
- Allium borszczowii Regel

Species of plant

Allium borszczowii is a plant species native to Uzbekistan, Kazakhstan, Turkmenistan, Iran, Afghanistan and Pakistan. It is about 30 cm tall with white and purplish flowers.
