= List of onion cultivars =

There are dozens of cultivars of the onion (Allium cepa), one of the most widely cultivated species of the genus Allium, But there are also other species cultivated as 'onions'. Many are named after the first person to breed them, or the locality they came from. Different localities often use their own common names for cultivars that are genetically almost identical. Sometimes different cultivars are known by the same common name (for example the name 'Chinese chives' could be referring to Allium odorum or Allium tuberosum). This list is based on the USDAs accepted classification.

== Cultivar names ==
Common name	Scientific name	Image	Notes
Abrams' onion	Allium abramsii (Ownbey & Aase) McNeal		
Allegheny onion	Allium allegheniense Small		
Aspen onion	Allium bisceptrum S. Watson var. palmeri (S. Watson) Cronquist		
Autumn onion	Allium stellatum Fraser ex Ker Gawl.		
Bear garlic, Ramsons, Wild Garlic	Allium ursinum L.		
Beegum onion	Allium hoffmanii Ownbey		
Bigelow's onion	Allium bigelovii S. Watson		
Black garlic	Allium nigrum L.		
Blue Mountain onion	Allium dictuon H. St. John		
Bolander's onion	Allium bolanderi S. Watson and vars. bolanderi, mirabile, stenanthum		
Brandegee's onion	Allium brandegeei S. Watson		
Broadleaf wild leek	Allium ampeloprasum L.		
Broadleaf wild leek	Allium atroviolaceum Boiss.		
Broadstemmed onion	Allium platycaule S. Watson		
Bulbil onion	Allium geyeri S. Watson var. tenerum M.E. Jones		
Burlew's onion	Allium burlewii Davidson		
Cascade onion	Allium cratericola Eastw.		
Chinese chives	Allium odorum L.		
Chinese chives	Allium tuberosum Rottler ex Spreng.		
Clokey's onion	Allium howellii Eastw. var. clokeyi Ownbey & Aase		
Coastal onion	Allium dichlamydeum Greene		
Columbian onion	Allium columbianum (Ownbey & Mingrone) P. Peterson, Annable & Rieseberg		
Compact onion	Allium vineale L. ssp. compactum (Thuill.) Coss. & Germ.		
Congdon's onion	Allium sanbornii Alph. Wood var. congdonii Jeps.		
Crinkled onion	Allium crispum Greene		
Cuddy Mountain onion	Allium fibrillum M.E. Jones		
Cultivated garlic	Allium sativum L.		
Darkred onion	Allium atrorubens S. Watson and vars. atrorubens, cristatum		
Dotted onion	Allium punctum L.F. Hend.		
Douglas' onion	Allium douglasii Hook.		
Drummond's onion	Allium drummondii Regel		
Dusky onion	Allium campanulatum S. Watson		
Early onion	Allium praecox Brandegee		
Egyptian onion	Allium proliferum (hybrid of A. cepa and A. fistulosum)		
Elmendorf's onion	Allium elmendorfii M.E. Jones ex Ownbey		
Field garlic	Allium oleraceum L.		
Fragile onion	Allium scilloides Douglas ex S. Watson		
Fraser meadow garlic	Allium canadense L. var. fraseri Ownbey		
Fringed onion	Allium fimbriatum S. Watson and var. fimbriatum		
Garden leek	Allium porrum L.		
Garden onion	Allium cepa L.		Synonyms: Allium cepa var. aggregatum G. Don; Allium cepa var. anglicum Alef.; Allium cepa var. argenteum Alef.; Allium cepa var. bifolium Alef.; Allium cepa var. bulbiferum Regel; Allium cepa var. crinides Alef.; Allium cepa var. flandricum Alef.; Allium cepa var. globosum Alef.; Allium cepa var. hispanicum Alef.; Allium cepa var. jamesii Alef.; Allium cepa var. lisboanum Alef.; Allium cepa var. luteum Alef.; Allium cepa var. multiplicans L.H. Bailey; Allium cepa var. portanum Alef.; Allium cepa var. praecox Alef.; Allium cepa var. proliferum (Moench) Regel; Allium cepa var. rosum Alef.; Allium cepa var. sanguineum Alef.; Allium cepa var. solaninum Alef; Allium cepa var. sylvestre Regel; Allium cepa var. tripolitanum Alef.; Allium cepa var. viviparum (Metz) Mansf.; Allium cepaeum St.-Lag.; Allium commune Noronha; Allium cumaria Buch.-Ham. ex Wall.; Allium esculentum Salisb.; Allium napus Pall. ex Kunth; Allium nigritanum A.Chev. [Invalid]; Allium pauciflorum Willd. ex Ledeb.; Allium salota Dostál; Ascalonicum sativum P.Renault; Cepa alba P.Renault; Cepa esculenta Gray; Cepa pallens P.Renault; Cepa rubra P.Renault; Cepa vulgaris (L.) Garsault [invalid]; Kepa esculenta (L.) Raf.; Porrum cepa (L.) Rchb.
Geyer's onion	Allium geyeri S. Watson and vars. chatterleyi, geyeri		
Gland onion	Allium glandulosum Link & Otto		
Glassy onion	Allium hyalinum Curran		
Goodding's onion	Allium gooddingii Ownbey		
Grand Coulee onion	Allium constrictum (Ownbey & Mingrone) P. Peterson, Annable & Rieseberg		
Hickman's onion	Allium hickmanii Eastw.		
Howell's onion	Allium howellii Eastw. and var. howellii		
Hyacinth meadow garlic	Allium canadense L. var. hyacinthoides (Bush) Ownbey & Aase		
Jepson's onion	Allium jepsonii (Ownbey & Aase) S. Denison & McNeal		
Jeweled onion	Allium serra McNeal & Ownbey		
Kern's pitted onion	Allium lacunosum S. Watson var. kernense McNeal & Ownbey		
Kunth's onion	Allium kunthii G. Don		
Largeflower onion	Allium macropetalum Rydb.		
Lemmon's onion	Allium lemmonii S. Watson		
Lillydale onion	Allium oxyphilum Wherry		
Little River Canyon onion	Allium speculae Ownbey & Aase		
Manyflower onion	Allium pleianthum S. Watson		
Meadow garlic	Allium canadense L. and vars. canadense, ecristatum, lavandulare, mobilense		
Mediterranean onion	Allium paniculatum L.		
Mexicali onion	Allium peninsulare Lemmon ex Greene		
Mojave fringed onion	Allium fimbriatum S. Watson var. mohavense (Tidestr.) Jeps.		
Munz's onion	Allium munzii (Ownbey ex Traub) McNeal		
Narrowleaf onion	Allium amplectens Hook.		
Narrowleaf wild leek	Allium burdickii (Hanes) A.G. Jones		
Nevada onion	Allium nevadense S. Watson		
Nevius' garlic	Allium nevii S. Watson		
New Mexican nodding onion	Allium cernuum Roth var. neomexicanum (Rydb.) J.F. Macbr.		
Nodding onion	Allium cernuum Roth and vars. cernuum, obtusum		
Olympic onion	Allium crenulatum Wiegand		
One-leaf onion	Allium unifolium Kellogg		
Pacific onion	Allium validum S. Watson		
Papery onion	Allium membranaceum Ownbey		
Parish's onion	Allium parishii S. Watson		
Parry's fringed onion	Allium parryi S. Watson		
Passey's onion	Allium passeyi N.H. Holmgren & A.H. Holmgren		
Peninsula onion	Allium peninsulare Lemmon ex Greene var. peninsulare		Many references give the common name "Peninsula Onion", this may be a perpetuated typo, but EOL uses "Peninsula onion"
Pitted onion	Allium lacunosum S. Watson and vars. davisiae, lacunosum, lacunosum, micranthum		
Plains onion	Allium perdulce S.V. Fraser and var.perdulce		
Purdy's fringed onion	Allium fimbriatum S. Watson var. purdyi (Eastw.) Ownbey & Aase		
Rakkyo	Allium chinense G. Don		
Ramp	Allium tricoccum Aiton		
Rawhide Hill onion	Allium tuolumnense (Ownbey & Aase) S. Denison & McNeal		
Red Sierra onion	Allium obtusum Lemmon and vars. conspicuum, obtusum		
Redskin onion	Allium haematochiton S. Watson		
Robinson's onion	Allium robinsonii L.F. Hend.		
Rock onion	Allium macrum S. Watson		
Runyon's onion	Allium runyonii Ownbey		
San Benito onion	Allium howellii Eastw. var. sanbenitense (Traub) Ownbey & Aase		
San Bernardino Mountain onion	Allium monticola Davidson		
San Francisco onion	Allium peninsulare Lemmon ex Greene var. franciscanum McNeal & Ownbey		
Sanborn's onion	Allium sanbornii Alph. Wood and var. sanbornii		
Sand leek	Allium scorodoprasum L. and ssp. rotundum		
Scytheleaf onion	Allium falcifolium Hook. & Arn.		
Serpentine onion	Allium diabolense (Ownbey & Aase) McNeal		
Sevendevils onion	Allium tolmiei (Hook.) Baker ex S. Watson var. persimile Ownbey		
Sharsmith's onion	Allium sharsmithiae (Ownbey & Aase) McNeal		
Shortstyle onion	Allium brevistylum S. Watson		
Simil onion	Allium simillimum L.F. Hend.		
Siskiyou onion	Allium siskiyouense Ownbey		
Small onion	Allium parvum Kellogg		
South Idaho onion	Allium aaseae Ownbey		
Spanish Needle onion	Allium shevockii McNeal		
Sperry's onion	Allium perdulce S.V. Fraser var. sperryi Ownbey		
Striped garlic	Allium cuthbertii Small		
Swamp onion	Allium madidum S. Watson		
Tanners Canyon onion	Allium plummerae S. Watson		
Tapertip onion	Allium acuminatum Hook.		
Textile onion	Allium textile A. Nelson & J.F. Macbr.		
Threebract onion	Allium tribracteatum Torr.		
Threecorner leek	Allium triquetrum L.		
Tolmie's onion	Allium tolmiei (Hook.) Baker ex S. Watson and var. tolmiei		
Toothed onion	Allium denticulatum (Ownbey & Aase) McNeal		
Triploid onion	Allium cornutum		
Twincrest onion	Allium bisceptrum S. Watson and var. bisceptrum		
Twinleaf onion	Allium anceps Kellogg		
Victory onion	Allium victorialis L.		
Wakegi onion	Allium wakegi (hybrid between A. cepa and A. fistulosum)		
Wallowa onion	Allium tolmiei (Hook.) Baker ex S. Watson var. platyphyllum (Tidestr.) Ownbey		
Welsh onion	Allium fistulosum L.		
White garlic	Allium neapolitanum Cirillo		
Wild chives	Allium schoenoprasum L. and vars. schoenoprasum, sibiricum		
Wild garlic	Allium vineale L. and ssp. vineale		
Wild onion	Allium ascalonicum L.		
Yellowflower onion	Allium coryi M.E. Jones		
Yosemite onion	Allium yosemitense Eastw.		
