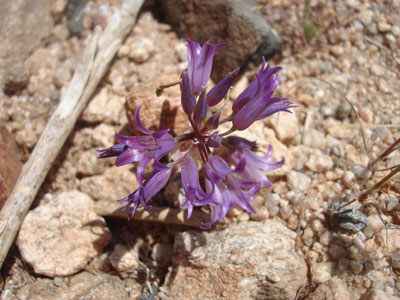

Scientific classification
- Kingdom: Plantae
- Clade: Tracheophytes
- Clade: Angiosperms
- Clade: Monocots
- Order: Asparagales
- Family: Amaryllidaceae
- Subfamily: Allioideae
- Genus: Allium
- Species: A. denticulatum

Binomial name
- Allium denticulatum (Ownbey & Aase ex Traub) McNeal, nom. illegit.

Synonyms
- Allium fimbriatum var. denticulatum Ownbey & Aase ex Traub

= Allium denticulatum =

Toothed wild onion

Species of flowering plant

Allium denticulatum is a species of wild onion known by the common name toothed wild onion. It is endemic to southern California, where it grows in the western Mojave Desert, the adjacent Tehachapi Mountains, the southern Sierra Nevada, and the Palomar Mountains. It is reported from Kern, San Bernardino, Riverside, Ventura, San Diego Counties.

== Description ==
Allium denticulatum grows from a reddish-brown spherical to oval-shaped bulb just over a centimeter long. It produces a stem up to 18 centimeters tall and a single cylindrical leaf up to twice as long as the stem. The inflorescence contains up to 30 flowers with deep pink to purplish tepals which are toothed at their tips (this being unusual in the genus).

== Taxonomy ==
Some sources prefer to treat this taxon as a variety of Allium fimbriatum, A. fimbriatum var. denticulatum, rather than a distinct species. Allium denticulatum Kit is a synonym of a different species, Allium carinatum.
