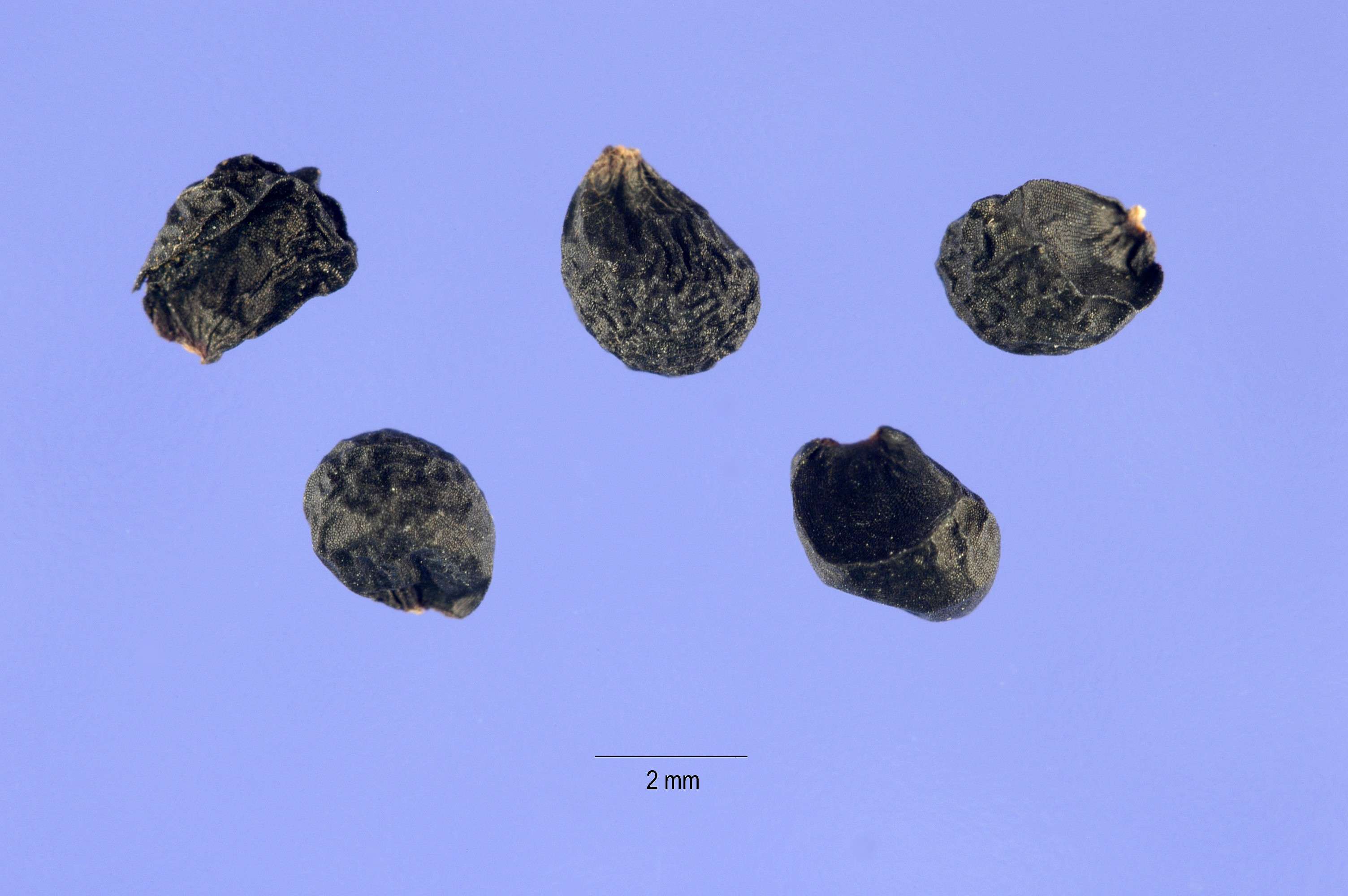
- "Allium tolmiei" seeds collected in England

Conservation status
- Apparently Secure (NatureServe)

Scientific classification
- Kingdom: Plantae
- Clade: Embryophytes
- Clade: Tracheophytes
- Clade: Angiosperms
- Clade: Monocots
- Order: Asparagales
- Family: Amaryllidaceae
- Subfamily: Allioideae
- Genus: Allium
- Species: A. tolmiei

Binomial name
- Allium tolmiei Baker

Synonyms
- Allium cusickii; Allium persimile; Allium platyphyllum

= Allium tolmiei =

North American onion species

Allium tolmiei (Tolmie's onion) is a plant species native to Idaho, eastern and central Oregon, southeastern Washington, northwestern Nevada and northeastern California. It occurs on mountains and scrublands at elevations of 1,300–9,200 feet (400–2,800 m). It was discovered by and named for Dr. William Fraser Tolmie.

Allium tolmiei produces ovoid to oblique bulbs up to 0.79 inches (2 cm) long, the bulbs generally disappearing at flowering time but then reforming later. Flowers are bell-shaped, up to 0.47 inches (12 mm) across; tepals white to pink with reddish midribs; anthers purple or yellow; pollen yellow.

== Taxonomy ==
The botanist John Gilbert Baker scientifically described a new species in the Allium genus in 1876, which he named Allium tolmiei . Though it was described as a variety of Allium douglasii in 1947 by Hamilton Paul Traub, it is generally accepted as a species. Together with its genus it is classified in the Amaryllidaceae family and has two varieties according to Plants of the World Online.

- Allium tolmiei var. tolmiei - scapes 5–30 centimeters (2.0–11.8 in) tall; stamens shorter than tepals
- Allium tolmiei var. persimile Ownbey (syn Allium persimile (Ownbey) Traub & Ownbey) - scapes 10–40 centimeters (3.9–15.7 in) tall; stamens longer than sepals—known only from the Seven Devils Mountains in Idaho

Allium tolmiei has seven synonyms of the species or its two varieties.

Table of Synonyms
Name	Year	Rank	Synonym of:	Notes
Allium anceps var. aberrans M.E.Jones	1902	variety	subsp. tolmiei	= het.
Allium cusickii S.Watson	1879	species	subsp. tolmiei	= het.
Allium douglasii var. tolmiei (Baker) Traub	1947	variety	A. tolmiei	≡ hom.
Allium persimile (Ownbey) Traub & Ownbey	1967	species	subsp. persimile	≡ hom.
Allium platyphyllum Tidestr.	1916	species	subsp. tolmiei	= het.
Allium pleianthum S.Watson	1879	species	subsp. tolmiei	= het.
Allium tolmiei var. platyphyllum (Tidestr.) Ownbey	1950	variety	subsp. tolmiei	= het.
Notes: ≡ homotypic synonym ; = heterotypic synonym
