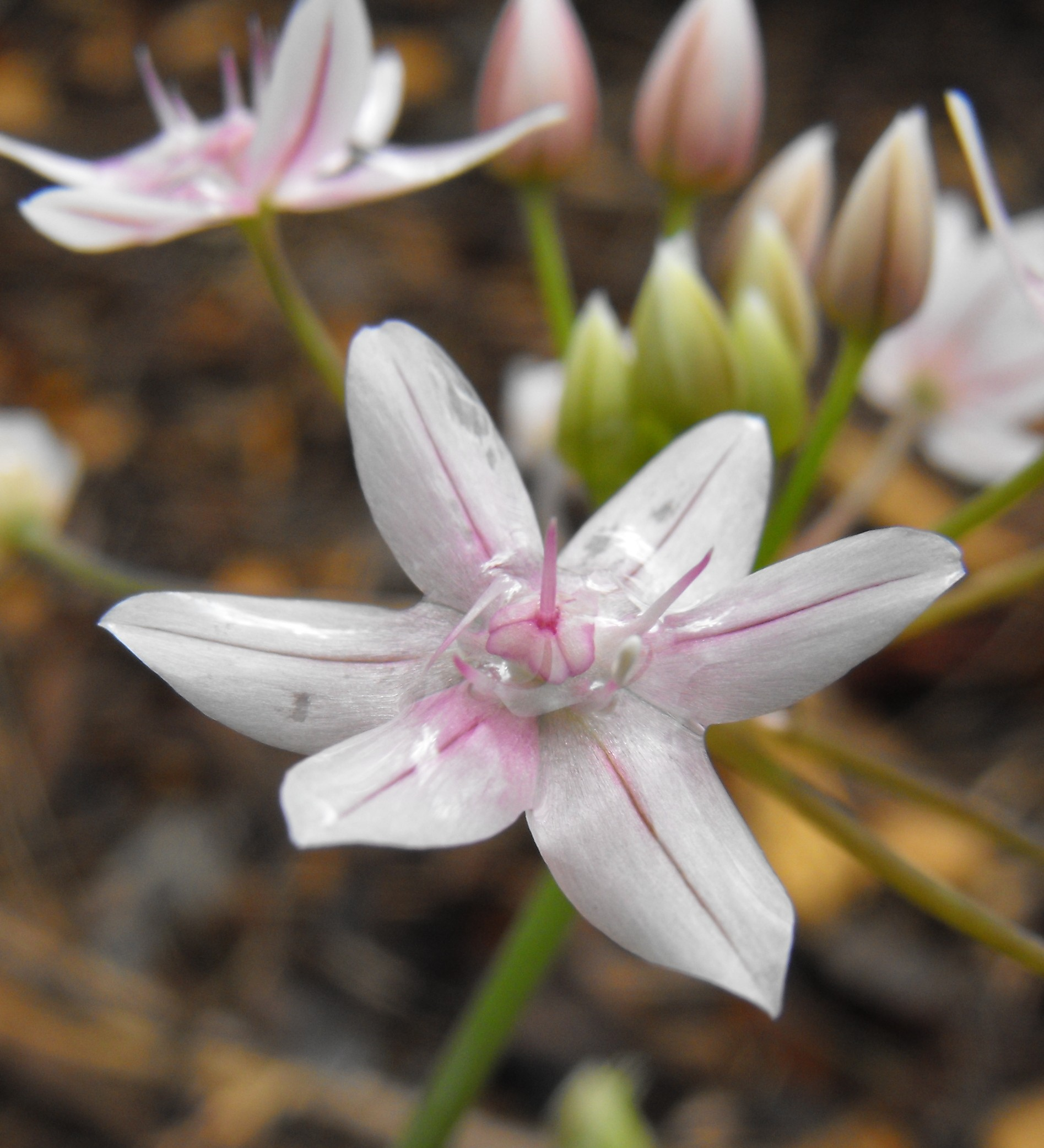

Conservation status
- Apparently Secure (NatureServe)

Scientific classification
- Kingdom: Plantae
- Clade: Tracheophytes
- Clade: Angiosperms
- Clade: Monocots
- Order: Asparagales
- Family: Amaryllidaceae
- Subfamily: Allioideae
- Genus: Allium
- Species: A. hyalinum

Binomial name
- Allium hyalinum Curran

Synonyms
- Allium hyalinum var. hickmanii Jeps.

= Allium hyalinum =

Species of flowering plant

Allium hyalinum is a Californian species of wild onion known by the common name glassy onion.

It is endemic to California, where it is a common species of the Sierra Nevada foothills, from 50–1,500 metres (160–4,920 ft) in elevation, from Kern County to Butte County. There are additional populations in the Coast Ranges of Lake, Alameda, Santa Clara, Merced, and San Benito Counties.

== Description ==
Allium hyalinum, the glassy onion, grows from a cluster of bulbs, with each bulb sending up a tall stem.

Atop each stem is an inflorescence of up to 25, but usually fewer, white or pink-tinted white flowers. The flowers have six shiny tepals which become transparent as they age.

formerly included

Allium hyalinum var. praecox (Brandegee) Jeps., now called Allium praecox Brandegee
