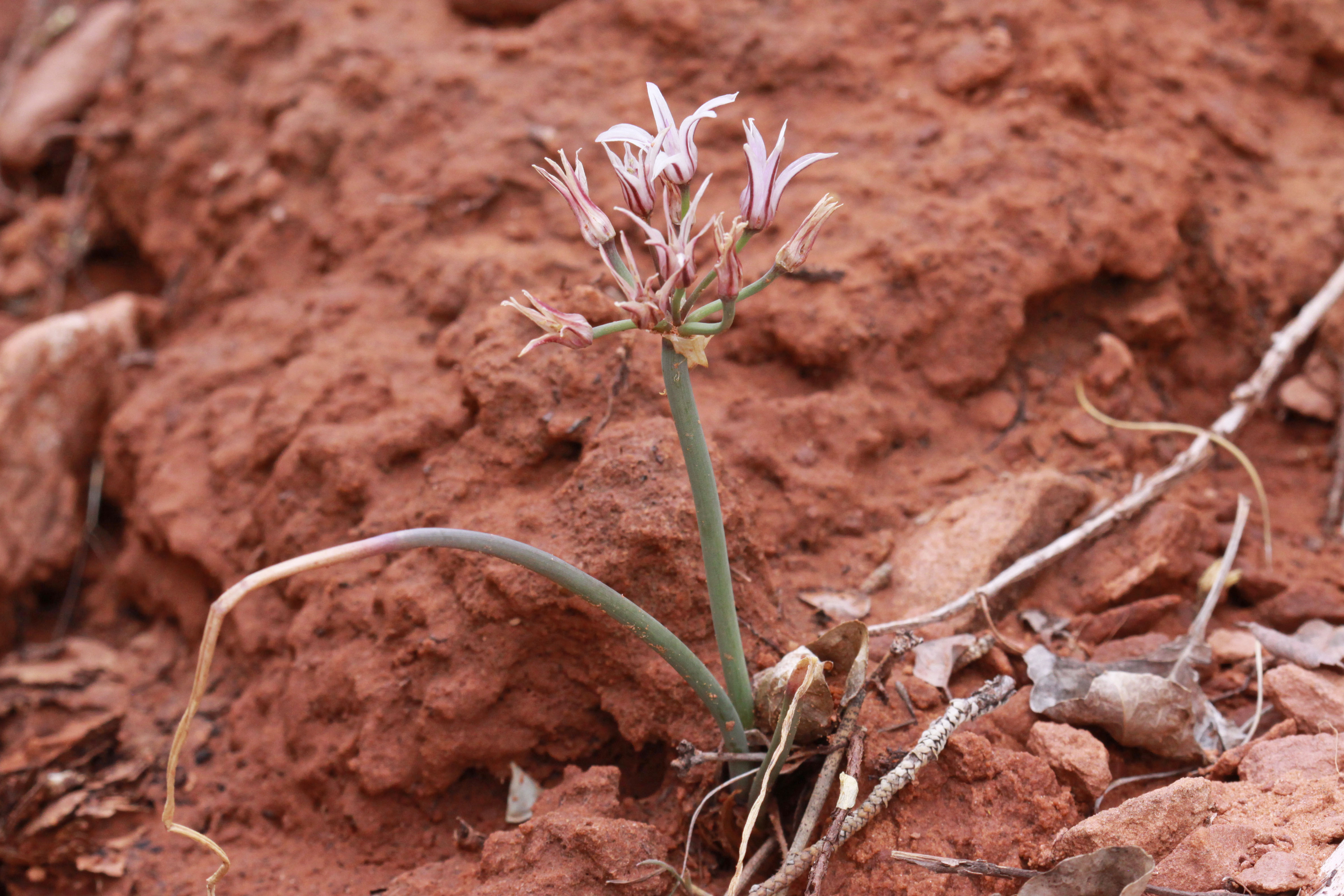

Conservation status
- Secure (NatureServe)

Scientific classification
- Kingdom: Plantae
- Clade: Tracheophytes
- Clade: Angiosperms
- Clade: Monocots
- Order: Asparagales
- Family: Amaryllidaceae
- Subfamily: Allioideae
- Genus: Allium
- Species: A. macropetalum

Binomial name
- Allium macropetalum M. E. Jones ex Ownbey

Synonyms
- Allium deserticola (M.E. Jones) Wooton & Standl.; Allium reticulatum var. deserticola M.E. Jones

= Allium macropetalum =

Desert onion

Species of flowering plant

Allium macropetalum, the desert onion, is a species of wild onion native to the desert regions of southwestern United States and northwestern Mexico. It is known from desert plains and hills in Sonora, Arizona, Utah, Colorado, New Mexico, and Texas, at elevations up to 2500 m.

Allium macropetalum forms egg-shaped bulbs up to 2.5 cm long. Flowers are bell-shaped, pink to purple, up to 12 mm across, with yellow or purple anthers.
