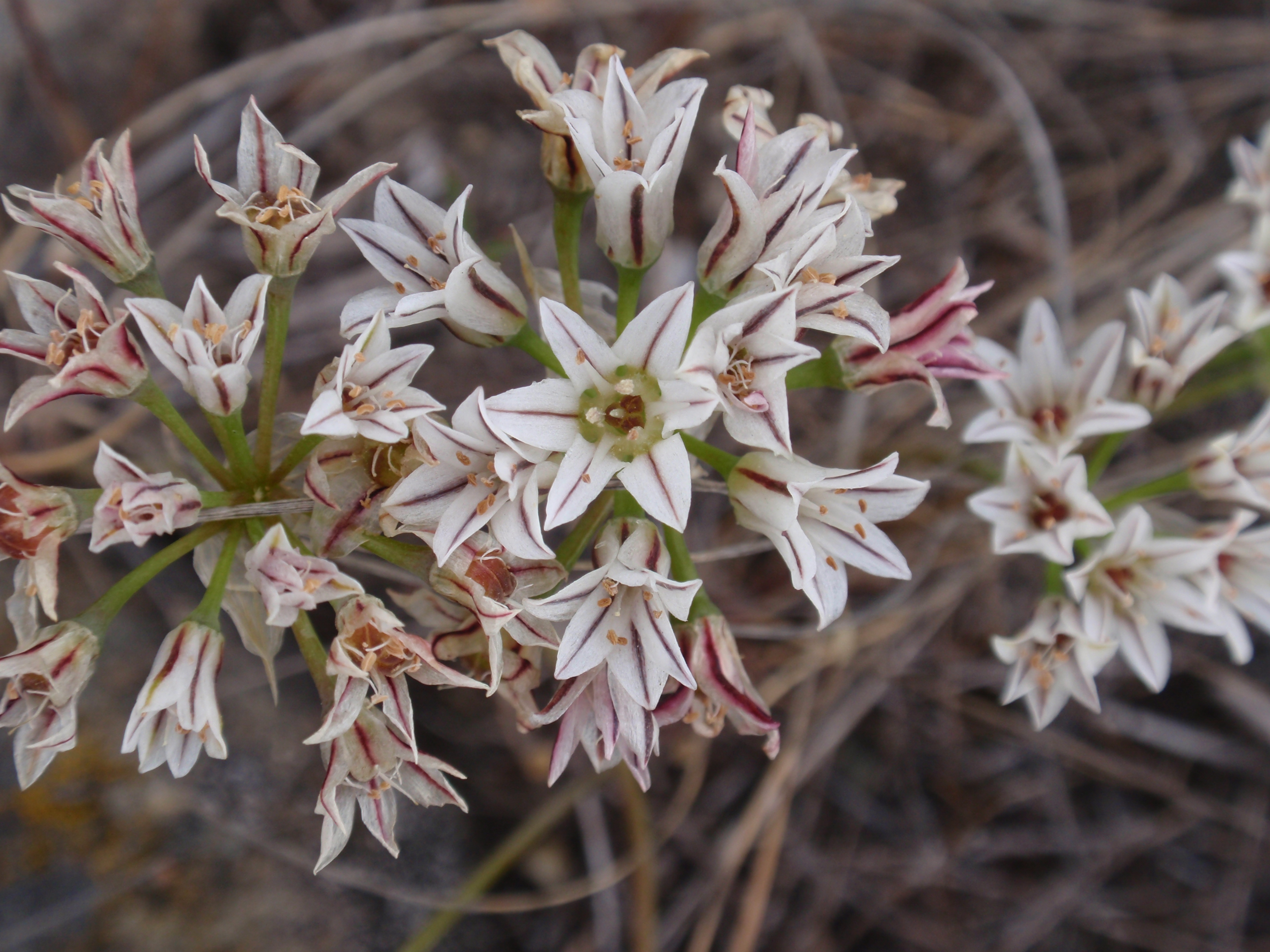
- var. lacunosum

Scientific classification
- Kingdom: Plantae
- Clade: Tracheophytes
- Clade: Angiosperms
- Clade: Monocots
- Order: Asparagales
- Family: Amaryllidaceae
- Subfamily: Allioideae
- Genus: Allium
- Species: A. lacunosum

Binomial name
- Allium lacunosum S.Wats.

= Allium lacunosum =

Species of flowering plant

Allium lacunosum is a species of wild onion known by the common name pitted onion. It is endemic to California, where it is a common member of the flora in many types of habitat, from bayside to mountain to desert.

== Description ==
The pitted onion, Allium lacunosum, grows from a thick-coated yellowish-brown bulb one or two centimeters long. The stem reaches up to about 35 centimetres (14 in) in maximum height. There are usually two leaves which may be as long or longer than the stem.

The inflorescence contains up to 45 dark-veined white to pale pink flowers, each less than a centimeter long.

Varieties

There are four varieties of this species, three of which are somewhat uncommon.

- Allium lacunosum var. davisiae — Southern California
- Allium lacunosum var. kernense — Southern Sierra, Mojave Desert.
- Allium lacunosum var. lacunosum
- Allium lacunosum var. micranthum — Central Coast interior ranges.
