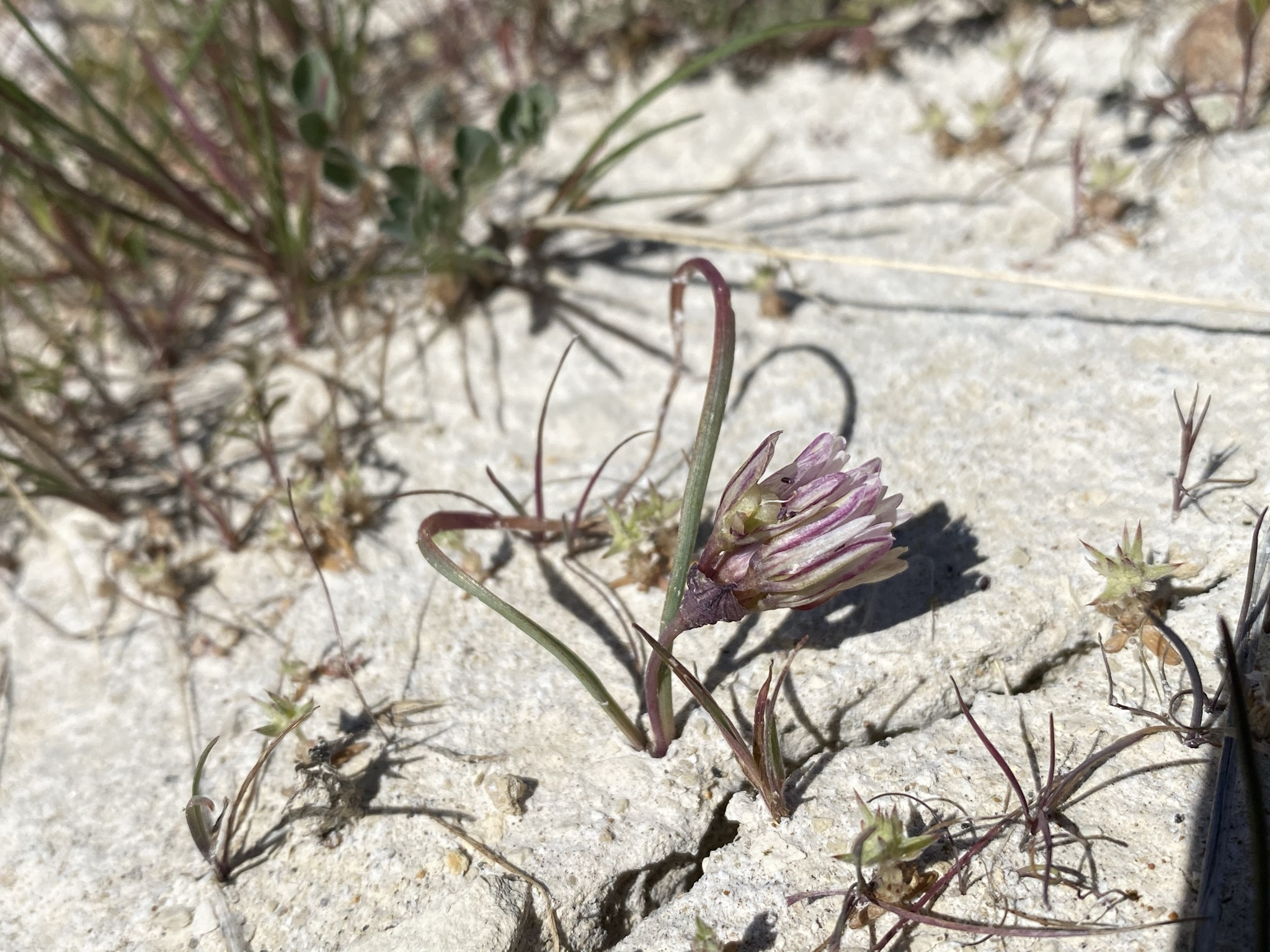
- Malheur County, Oregon

Conservation status
- Vulnerable (NatureServe)

Scientific classification
- Kingdom: Plantae
- Clade: Embryophytes
- Clade: Tracheophytes
- Clade: Angiosperms
- Clade: Monocots
- Order: Asparagales
- Family: Amaryllidaceae
- Subfamily: Allioideae
- Genus: Allium
- Species: A. punctum

Binomial name
- Allium punctum L.F.Hend.

= Allium punctum =

North American onion species

Allium punctum is a species of wild onion known by the common name dotted onion or Modoc onion. It is native to the western United States in and around the Modoc Plateau in northeastern California (Modoc County), northwestern Nevada (Humboldt County), and southeastern Oregon (Malheur, Lake and Harney Counties). It is uncommon, growing in volcanic flatlands created by old lava flows.

== Description ==
Allium punctum grows from a yellow-brown to grayish oval-shaped bulb one or two centimeters wide. It produces a short stem no more than 10 centimeters tall and two sickle-shaped leaves which are usually a bit longer. The inflorescence bears up to 20 flowers which are white or pink with purple veining.

== Taxonomy ==
In 1930 the botanist Louis Forniquet Henderson scientifically described a new species in the Allium genus which he named Allium punctum. Together with its genus it is classified in the Amaryllidaceae family and the species has no synonyms.
