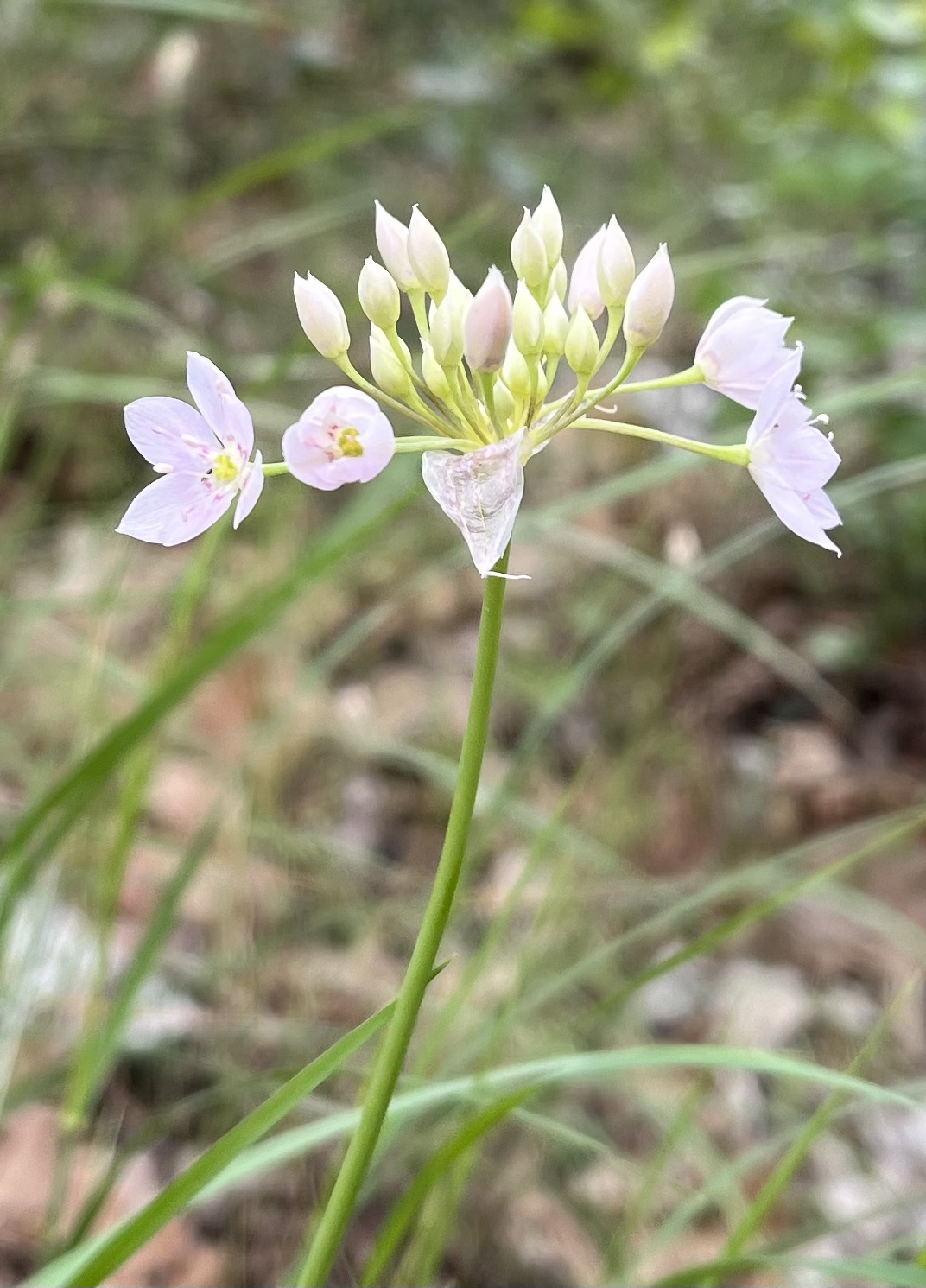

Scientific classification
- Kingdom: Plantae
- Clade: Tracheophytes
- Clade: Angiosperms
- Clade: Monocots
- Order: Asparagales
- Family: Amaryllidaceae
- Subfamily: Allioideae
- Genus: Allium
- Species: A. membranaceum

Binomial name
- Allium membranaceum Ownbey

= Allium membranaceum =

Papery onion

Species of flowering plant

Allium membranaceum is an uncommon species of wild onion known by the common name papery onion. It is endemic to California, where it grows in wooded areas in the southernmost Cascade Range, the northern Coast Ranges, and the Sierra Nevada foothills from Tulare County to Humboldt County. It is found on wooded slopes at elevations of 200–1400 m.

Allium membranaceum grows from an egg-shaped bulb up to 1.7 cm long which is sometimes associated with a cluster of smaller bulbs. The stem reaches a maximum height near 40 centimeters and there are two or three long, flat leaves about the same length. The inflorescence contains up to 35 flowers with white or pale pink tepals which become papery as they age. Anthers and pollen are yellow.
