= Allium runyonii =

Scientific classification
- Kingdom: Plantae
- Clade: Tracheophytes
- Clade: Angiosperms
- Clade: Monocots
- Order: Asparagales
- Family: Amaryllidaceae
- Subfamily: Allioideae
- Genus: Allium
- Species: A. runyonii

Binomial name
- Allium runyonii Ownbey

Species of flowering plant

Allium runyonii is a North American species of wild onion native to southern Texas about as far north as Corpus Christi, as well as to the Mexican States of Nuevo León and Tamaulipas. It is found on sandy soils including in plains along the Río Grande.

Allium runyonii produces egg-shaped bulbs up to 2 cm long. Flowering stalks can reach a height of 50 cm. Flowers are urn-shaped, about 6 mm across; tepals white with pinkish midribs; anthers and pollen are yellow; ovary does not have a crest.
