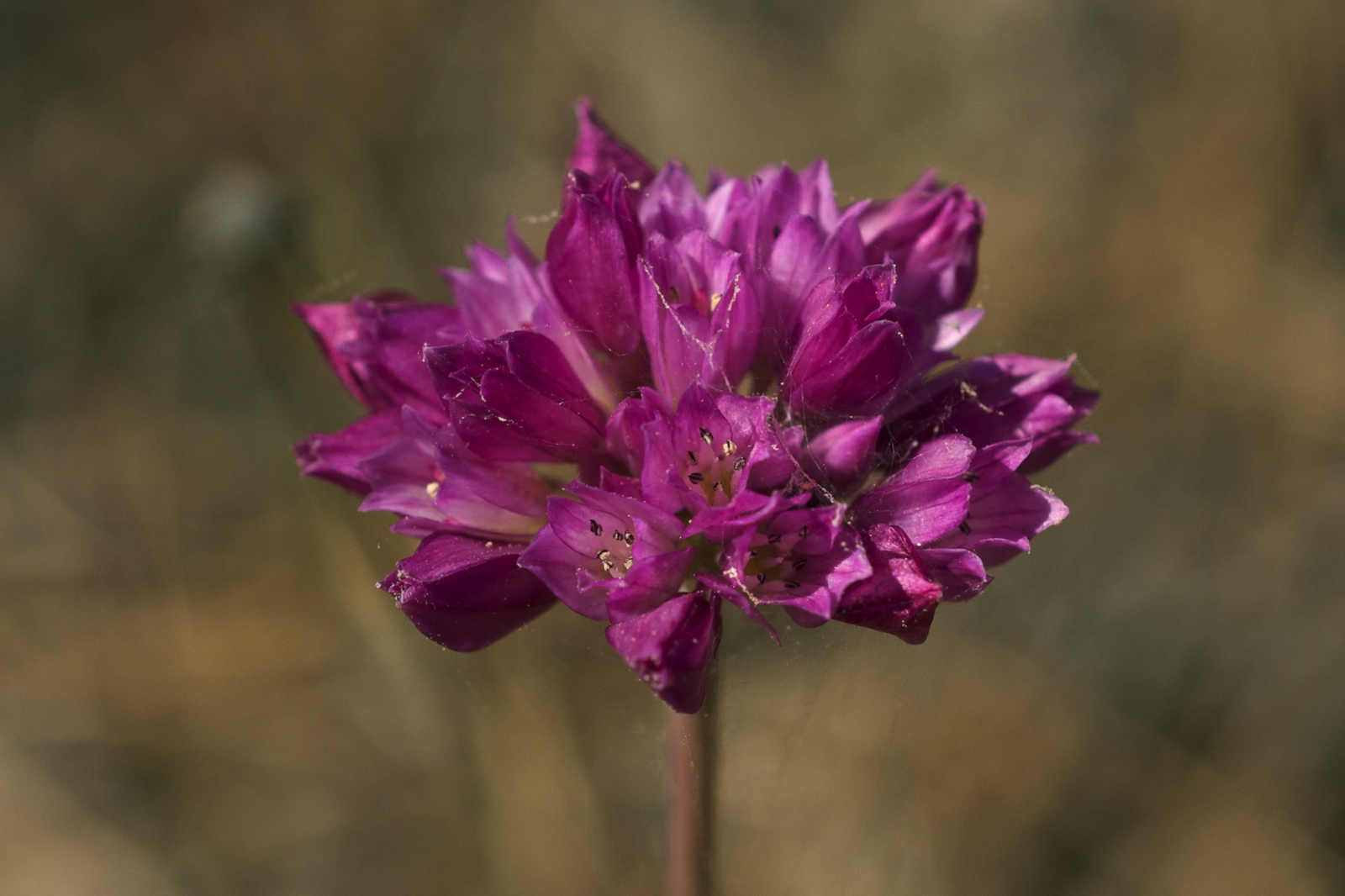

Conservation status
- Vulnerable (NatureServe)

Scientific classification
- Kingdom: Plantae
- Clade: Tracheophytes
- Clade: Angiosperms
- Clade: Monocots
- Order: Asparagales
- Family: Amaryllidaceae
- Subfamily: Allioideae
- Genus: Allium
- Species: A. serra

Binomial name
- Allium serra McNeal & Ownbey

= Allium serra =

Species of flowering plant

Allium serra is a California species of wild onion known by several common names, including jeweled onion, pom-pon onion, and serrated onion.

It favors hard soils with rock and clay, including serpentine soil. It is found in the Coast Ranges of central and northern California, from Merced County to Humboldt County.

Allium serra plant produces a small herringbone-patterned bulb an average of one centimeter in diameter. It has a long stem on which it bears a tightly bunched umbel of flowers. The attractive bright pink flowers are thimble or bell-shaped, often iridescent when new and becoming papery as they dry.
