= Allium coryi =

Yellowflower onion

Scientific classification
- Kingdom: Plantae
- Clade: Tracheophytes
- Clade: Angiosperms
- Clade: Monocots
- Order: Asparagales
- Family: Amaryllidaceae
- Subfamily: Allioideae
- Genus: Allium
- Species: A. coryi

Binomial name
- Allium coryi M.E. Jones

Synonyms
- Allium crenulatum Wiegand

Species of flowering plant

Allium coryi, common name yellowflower onion, is a plant species endemic to trans-Pecos Texas, but sometimes cultivated as an ornamental elsewhere. It is reported in the wild from only five counties: Brewster, Presidio, Jeff Davis, Pecos and Terrell. Some of the populations lie inside Big Bend National Park.

Allium coryi grows on rocky slopes and plains at elevations of 800–1400 m. It produces egg-shaped bulbs up to 2 cm long. Flowers are bright yellow, up to 10 mm across; anthers and pollen are yellow.
