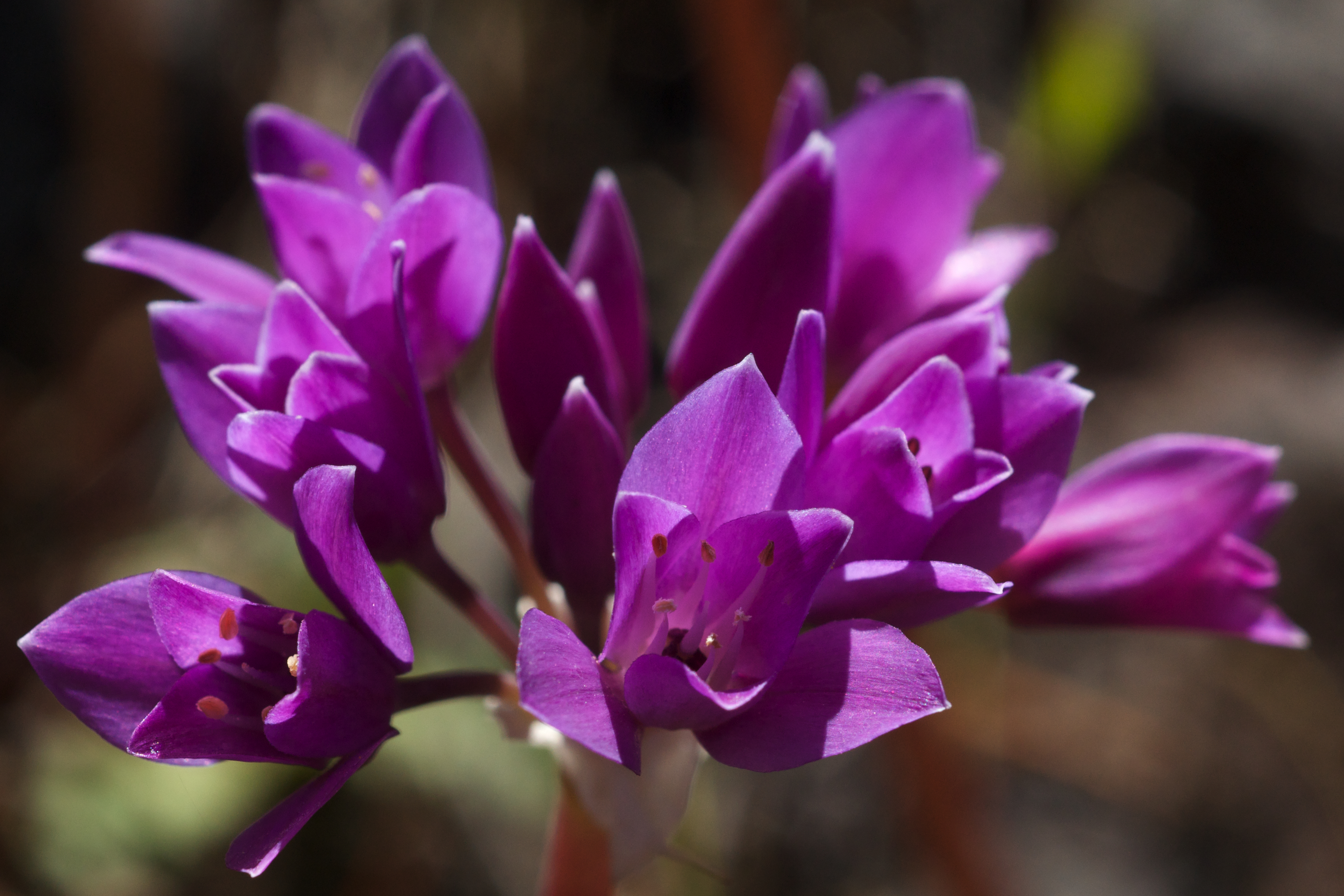

Conservation status
- Apparently Secure (NatureServe)

Scientific classification
- Kingdom: Plantae
- Clade: Tracheophytes
- Clade: Angiosperms
- Clade: Monocots
- Order: Asparagales
- Family: Amaryllidaceae
- Subfamily: Allioideae
- Genus: Allium
- Species: A. dichlamydeum

Binomial name
- Allium dichlamydeum Greene

Synonyms
- Allium serratum var. dichlamydeum (Greene) M.E. Jones

= Allium dichlamydeum =

Coastal onion

Species of flowering plant

Allium dichlamydeum is a species of wild onion known by the common name coastal onion. It is endemic to California where it grows on sea cliffs and hills overlooking the ocean, from Santa Barbara County to Mendocino County.

== Description ==
Allium dichlamydeum grows from a brown or gray bulb 1.0–1.5 cm wide. It has a stout naked green stem surrounded by 3–6 long onion leaves. Atop the thick stem is an inflorescence of 5–30 flowers. Each flower has six oval-shaped dull-pointed tepals in shades of bright magenta to fuchsia and each flower is about a centimeter wide.
