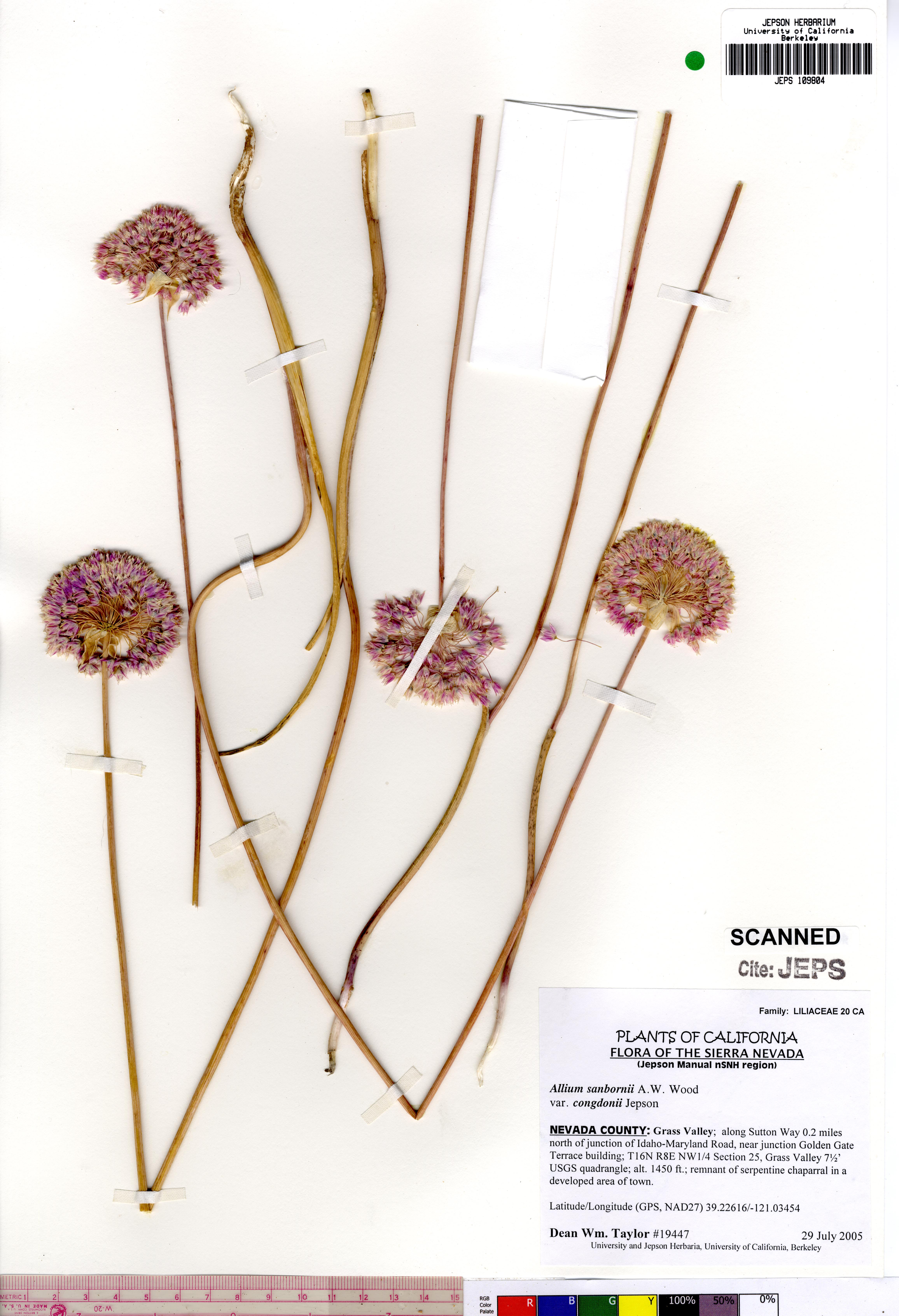
- Allium sanbornii var. congdonii

Conservation status
- Vulnerable (NatureServe)

Scientific classification
- Kingdom: Plantae
- Clade: Tracheophytes
- Clade: Angiosperms
- Clade: Monocots
- Order: Asparagales
- Family: Amaryllidaceae
- Subfamily: Allioideae
- Genus: Allium
- Subgenus: A. subg. Amerallium
- Species: A. sanbornii

Binomial name
- Allium sanbornii Alph.Wood

Synonyms
- Allium intactum Jeps.; Allium sanbornii subsp. intactum (Jeps.) Traub

= Allium sanbornii =

Species of flowering plant

Allium sanbornii is a North American species of wild onion known by the common name Sanborn's onion. It is native to northern California and southwestern Oregon. It grows in the serpentine soils of the southern Cascade Range and northern Sierra Nevada foothills.

Allium sanbornii produces a reddish-brown bulb up to about 2.5 cm (1 in) long. Scape up to 60 cm (24 in) long, bearing a single cylindrical leaf which is about the same length. The umbel contains as many as 150 small flowers, each with tepals less than a centimeter long, pink to white with darker red midveins. Anthers are yellow or purple; pollen yellow or white.

Varieties

- Allium sanbornii var. congdonii Jeps. - from Nevada County to Mariposa County
- Allium sanbornii var. sanbornii - from Shasta County to Mariposa County in California; Jackson + Josephine Counties in Oregon

formerly included

- Allium sanbornii var. jepsonii Ownbey & Aase ex Traub, now called Allium jepsonii (Ownbey & Aase ex Traub) S.S.Denison & McNeal
- Allium sanbornii var. tuolumnense Ownbey & Aase ex Traub, now called Allium tuolumnense (Ownbey & Aase ex Traub) S.S.Denison & McNeal
