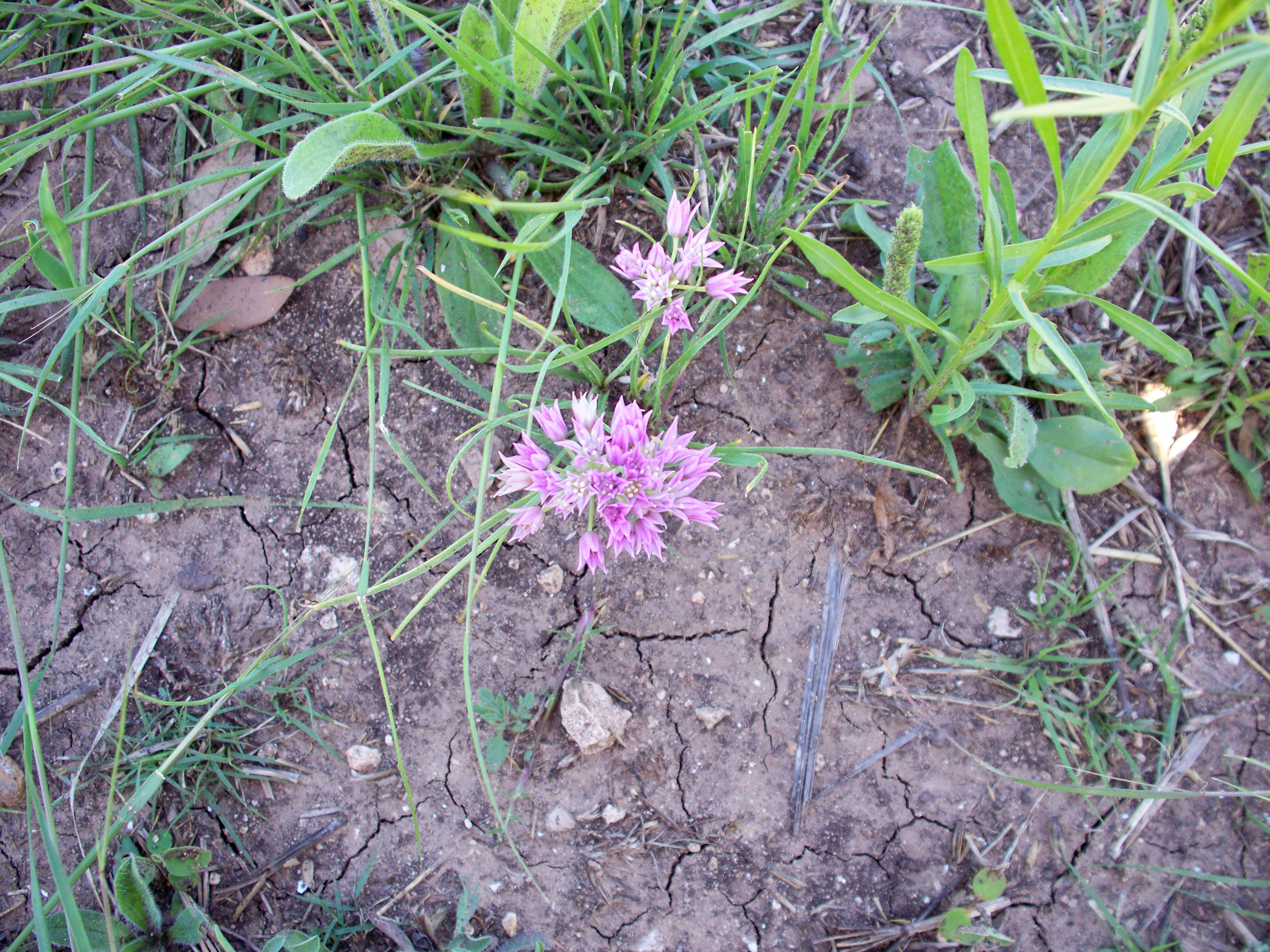

Conservation status
- Secure (NatureServe)

Scientific classification
- Kingdom: Plantae
- Clade: Embryophytes
- Clade: Tracheophytes
- Clade: Spermatophytes
- Clade: Angiosperms
- Clade: Monocots
- Order: Asparagales
- Family: Amaryllidaceae
- Subfamily: Allioideae
- Genus: Allium
- Subgenus: A. subg. Amerallium
- Species: A. drummondii

Binomial name
- Allium drummondii Regel

Synonyms
- Allium nuttallii S.Watson; Allium helleri Small; Allium reticulatum var. nuttallii (S.Watson) M.E.Jones; Allium drummondii f. asexuale Ownbey

= Allium drummondii =

Drummond's onion

Species of flowering plant

Allium drummondii, also known as Drummond's onion, wild garlic and prairie onion, is a North American species of onion native to the southern Great Plains of North America. It is found in South Dakota, Kansas, Nebraska, Colorado, Oklahoma, Arkansas, Texas, New Mexico, and northeastern Mexico.

Allium drummondii is a bulb-forming perennial. The flowers appear in April and May, in a variety of colors ranging from white to pink. It is common, considered invasive in some regions.

== Uses ==
This species of Allium is gathered by Native Americans for its small edible bulbs. These contain a considerable amount of inulin, a non-reducing sugar that humans cannot digest. Because of this, these onions must be heated for a long period of time in order to convert the inulin into digestible sugars.
