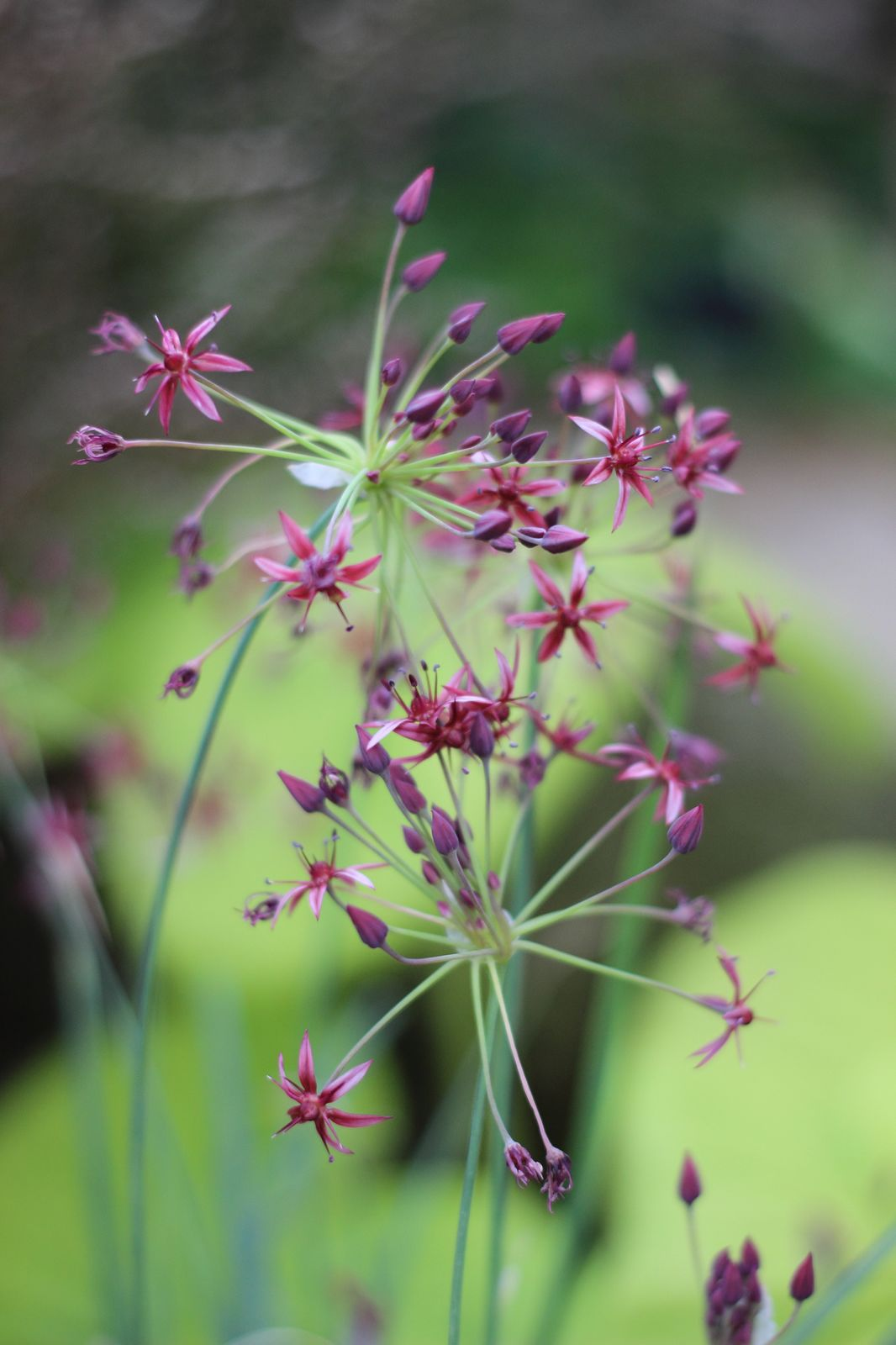

Scientific classification
- Kingdom: Plantae
- Clade: Embryophytes
- Clade: Tracheophytes
- Clade: Spermatophytes
- Clade: Angiosperms
- Clade: Monocots
- Order: Asparagales
- Family: Amaryllidaceae
- Subfamily: Allioideae
- Genus: Allium
- Subgenus: A. subg. Amerallium
- Species: A. glandulosum

Binomial name
- Allium glandulosum Link & Otto

Synonyms
- Allium longifolium Lindl.

= Allium glandulosum =

Species of plant

Allium glandulosum, the gland onion, is a species of flowering plant in the family Amaryllidaceae, native to Mexico, Guatemala, and Honduras. It has a history of cultivation by indigenous Mesoamerican peoples.
