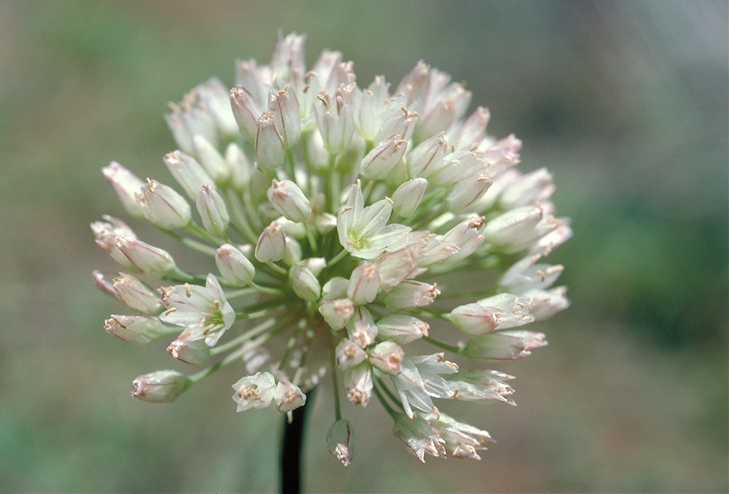

Conservation status
- Vulnerable (NatureServe)

Scientific classification
- Kingdom: Plantae
- Clade: Tracheophytes
- Clade: Angiosperms
- Clade: Monocots
- Order: Asparagales
- Family: Amaryllidaceae
- Subfamily: Allioideae
- Genus: Allium
- Subgenus: Allium subg. Melanocrommyum
- Species: A. howellii

Binomial name
- Allium howellii Eastw.

= Allium howellii =

Species of flowering plant

Allium howellii is a North American species of wild onion known by the common name Howell's onion. It is endemic to California.

== Description ==
Allium howellii is a tall onion plant, producing a stem which may exceed half a meter in height from a reddish-brown bulb one to two centimeters long. There is a single cylindrical leaf about as long as the stem. The inflorescence holds up to 100 dark-veined lavender to white flowers, each under a centimeter long.

== Varieties ==
Several varieties have been named:

- Allium howellii var. clokeyi Ownbey & Aase ex Traub - San Bernardino, Los Angeles, Ventura, Santa Barbara counties
- Allium howellii var. howellii - Merced, Fresno, Kern, San Luis Obispo counties
- Allium howellii var. sanbenitense (Traub) Ownbey & Aase - San Benito County

== Distribution and habitat ==
Howell's onion grows in the granite and serpentine soils of several mountain ranges, hills, and valleys from San Joaquin County to San Bernardino County.
