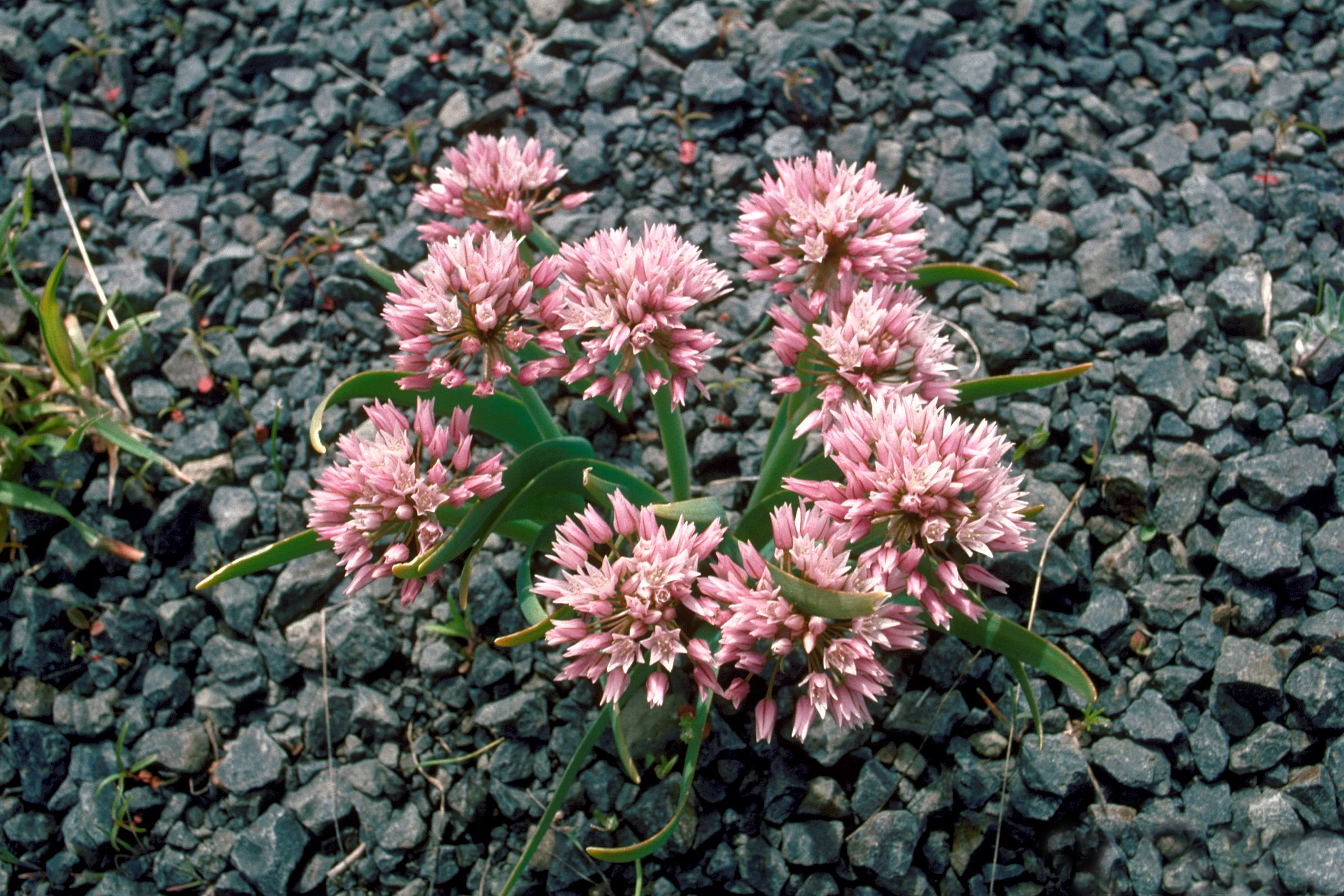

Conservation status
- Apparently Secure (NatureServe)

Scientific classification
- Kingdom: Plantae
- Clade: Tracheophytes
- Clade: Angiosperms
- Clade: Monocots
- Order: Asparagales
- Family: Amaryllidaceae
- Subfamily: Allioideae
- Genus: Allium
- Species: A. macrum

Binomial name
- Allium macrum S.Wats.

Synonyms
- Allium equicaeleste H.St. John

= Allium macrum =

Species of wild onion native to the United States

Allium macrum, the rock onion, is an American species of wild onion native to the eastern and central parts of the US States of Oregon and Washington. It grows on gravelly soils at elevations up to 1400 m. It is a perennial herb.

Allium macrum produces round to egg-shaped bulbs up to 2 cm long. Flowers are white to pale pink with a green stripe running the length of each tepal. Anthers and pollen are yellow.
