= Allium dictuon =

Blue Mountain onion

Conservation status
- Imperiled (NatureServe)

Scientific classification
- Kingdom: Plantae
- Clade: Embryophytes
- Clade: Tracheophytes
- Clade: Angiosperms
- Clade: Monocots
- Order: Asparagales
- Family: Amaryllidaceae
- Subfamily: Allioideae
- Genus: Allium
- Species: A. dictuon

Binomial name
- Allium dictuon H.St.John

Species of flowering plant

Allium dictuon is a species of wild onion known by the common name Blue Mountain onion. It is native to a small section of the Blue Mountains straddling the border between southeastern Washington and northeastern Oregon in the United States. It grows in Columbia, Garfield and Walla Walla Counties in Washington, plus Umatilla and Wallowa Counties in Oregon.

== Description ==
Allium dictuon grows from bulbs connected by rhizomes. It produces two or three leaves each up to 28 centimeters in length. The scape is 20 to 40 centimeters tall and bears an umbel of up to 25 flowers. The bell-shaped flowers are bright pink or purplish and each is 1.1 to 1.6 centimeters long. Blooming occurs in June and July. The lanceolate tepals color can range from bright pink to rose purple. The outer tepals are wider and longer than the inter tepals. The shining seeds color is black. They are usually identifiable in June or July. It flowers in June and July.

== Habitat ==
Allium dictuon grows in dry, open, rocky habitat. The elevations range from 800–1,650 meters (2,620–5,410 ft). The vegetation in the area is dominated by bluebunch wheatgrass (Pseudoroegneria spicata ssp. spicata).

The total population has been estimated to be between 200 and 500 individuals. All of its populations are within the Umatilla National Forest.
