= Allium madidum =

Mountain swamp onion

Scientific classification
- Kingdom: Plantae
- Clade: Tracheophytes
- Clade: Angiosperms
- Clade: Monocots
- Order: Asparagales
- Family: Amaryllidaceae
- Subfamily: Allioideae
- Genus: Allium
- Species: A. madidum

Binomial name
- Allium madidum S.Wats.

Species of flowering plant

Allium madidum, common name mountain swamp onion, is a plant species native to the west-central Idaho (Valley, Adams, and Washington Counties), southern Washington (Walla Walla County) and eastern Oregon. It grows in wet meadows at elevations of 1100–2000 m.

Allium madidum produces 1-3 bulbs with as many as 30 smaller bulbils attached. The full-size bulbs are round to egg-shaped, up to 1.6 cm long. Flowers are bell-shaped, up to 10 mm across; tepals white with green or pink midveins; pollen yellow. Flowers bloom May to July.
