= Allium constrictum =

Conservation status
- Imperiled (NatureServe)

Scientific classification
- Kingdom: Plantae
- Clade: Tracheophytes
- Clade: Angiosperms
- Clade: Monocots
- Order: Asparagales
- Family: Amaryllidaceae
- Subfamily: Allioideae
- Genus: Allium
- Species: A. constrictum

Binomial name
- Allium constrictum (F.M.Ownbey & L.V.Mingrone) M. E. Jones ex Ownbey
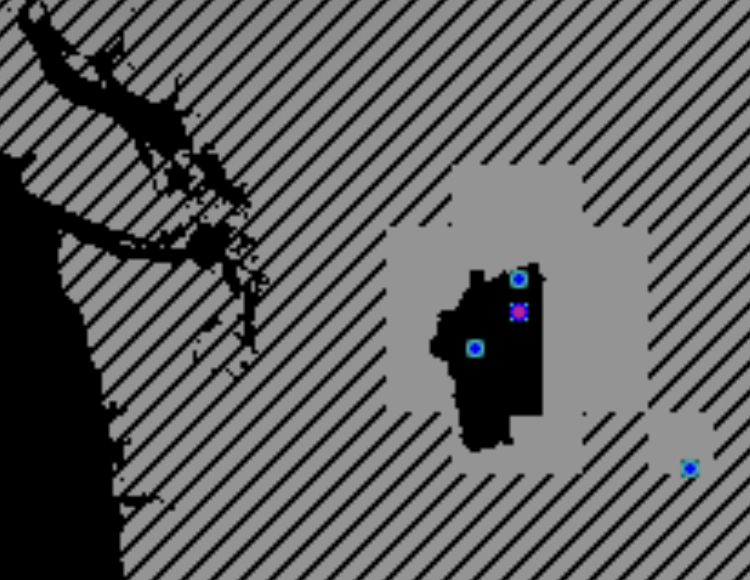
- Allium constrictum range map

Synonyms
- Allium douglasii var. constrictum F.M.Ownbey & L.V.Mingrone

Species of flowering plant

Allium constrictum, the Grand Coulee onion, is a plant species endemic to the US state of Washington. It is known from only three counties in the east-central part of the state: Douglas, Grant, and Lincoln. It grows on dry, sandy soils at elevations of 300–500 m.

== Description ==
Allium constrictum produces egg-shaped bulbs up to 8 mm long. Flowers are up to 10 mm across, pink to rose with green midrib; anthers and pollen blue to gray It is a perennial bulb that has pink flowers. The 1-5 bulbs are ovoid and not clustered. The outer bulb coats contain 1 or more brownish bulbs. The outer bulb coats lack cellular reticulation and cells are only in 2-3 rows distal to roots. The two persistent leaves are green when flowering. There are no hairs or fibers. The inner bulb coats are white and have obscure cells. The flowers stalk are persistent and solitary. The six tepals color was light pink to rose with green or red midribs. The shining seeds were black. The seeds are identifiable in April to July. The flowering happens between the months of May to July. The fruit type is a capsule. The scape is up to 8 inches in height. The two leaves can get up to 14 inches long. The flower is an umbel, and has around 15-30 flowers.
