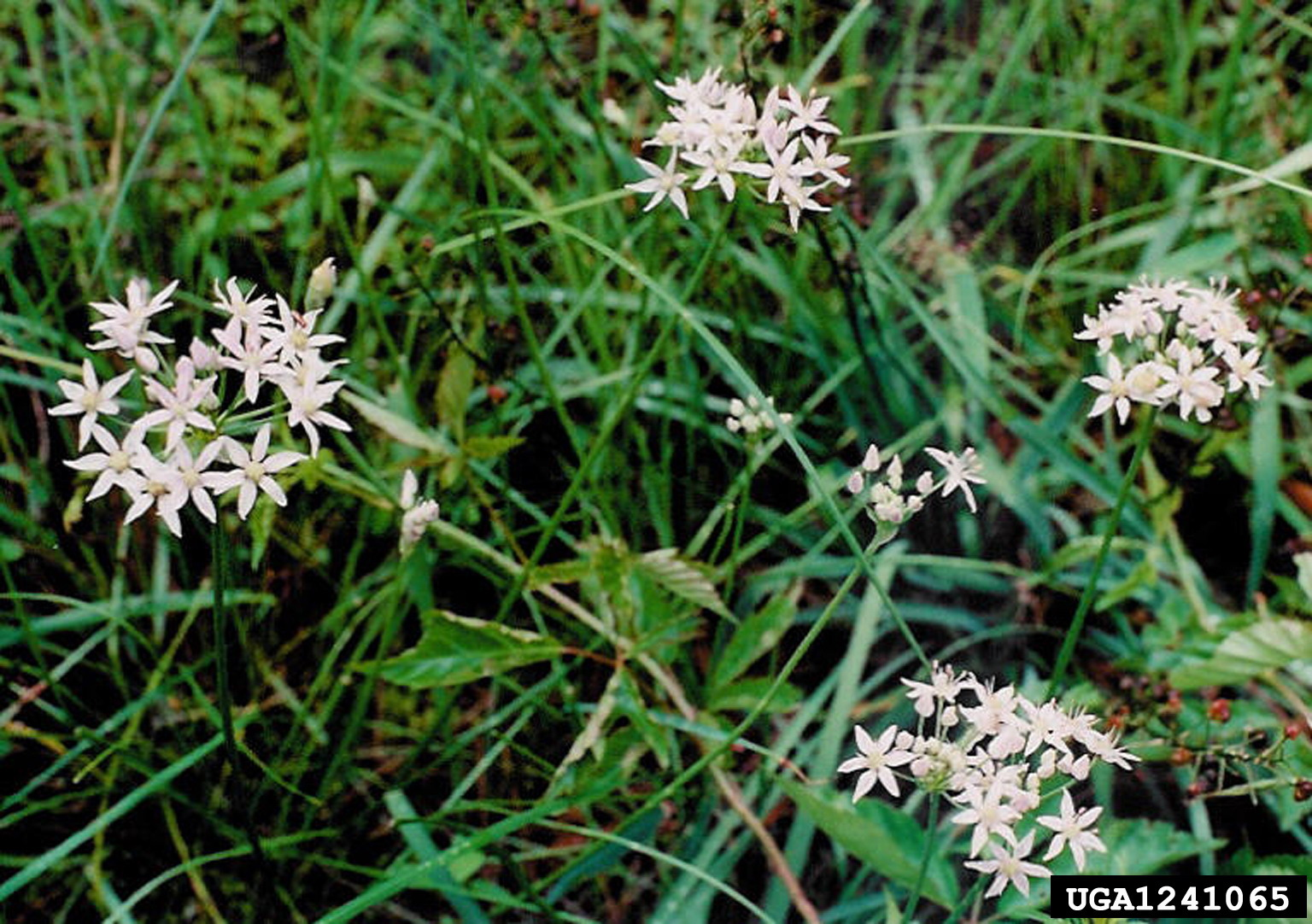
- Allium speculae in DeKalb County, Alabama

Scientific classification
- Kingdom: Plantae
- Clade: Tracheophytes
- Clade: Angiosperms
- Clade: Monocots
- Order: Asparagales
- Family: Amaryllidaceae
- Subfamily: Allioideae
- Genus: Allium
- Species: A. speculae

Binomial name
- Allium speculae Ownbey & Aase

= Allium speculae =

Little River Canyon Onion

Species of flowering plant

Allium speculae, the Little River Canyon onion, is a plant species native to the US States of Georgia and Alabama, especially in the vicinity of the Little River Canyon National Preserve in northeastern Alabama. It occurs on sandy and rocky soils in the Piedmont region at elevations of about 300 m.

Allium speculae produces egg-shaped bulbs up to 5 cm long. This species does not have rhizomes. Scapes are round in cross-section, up to 30 cm tall. Flowers bell-shaped, up to 6 mm across; tepals pink; anthers and pollen pale yellow; ovary crested.
