= Allium hoffmanii =

Beegum onion

Conservation status
- Apparently Secure (NatureServe)

Scientific classification
- Kingdom: Plantae
- Clade: Tracheophytes
- Clade: Angiosperms
- Clade: Monocots
- Order: Asparagales
- Family: Amaryllidaceae
- Subfamily: Allioideae
- Genus: Allium
- Species: A. hoffmanii

Binomial name
- Allium hoffmanii Ownbey ex Traub

Species of flowering plant

Allium hoffmanii is a species of wild onion known by the common name beegum onion. It is native to northern California, where it grows in the serpentine soils of the local mountain ranges in Siskiyou, Humboldt, Trinity, Shasta, and Tehama Counties.

This onion grows a short stem up to about 10 centimeters tall from a brown or reddish bulb one or two centimeters long. There is generally a single leaf which may be longer than the stem. The inflorescence is packed with up to 40 flowers, each about a centimeter long and pink or purple in color with greenish veining. The protruding stamens are bumpy at their bases and have purple anthers at the tips.
