= Allium parryi =

Parry's fringed onion

Scientific classification
- Kingdom: Plantae
- Clade: Tracheophytes
- Clade: Angiosperms
- Clade: Monocots
- Order: Asparagales
- Family: Amaryllidaceae
- Subfamily: Allioideae
- Genus: Allium
- Species: A. parryi

Binomial name
- Allium parryi S.Wats.

Synonyms
- Allium fimbriatum subsp. parryi (S.Watson) Traub & Ownbey; Allium kessleri Davidson

Species of flowering plant

Allium parryi is a North American species of wild onion known by the common names Parry's onion and Parry's fringed onion. It is common in the Coast Ranges of southern California and northern Baja California. It is also known from the southernmost reaches of the Sierra Nevada.

Allium parryi produceds a reddish-brown bulb roughly a centimeter long. It produces a short stem up to a maximum height of about 20 centimeters and a single cylindrical leaf which is generally a bit longer. The inflorescence contains up to 50 pink-veined white flowers which turn darker pink as they age. Each flower has narrow tepals less than a centimeter long.
