= Allium plummerae =

Conservation status
- Apparently Secure (NatureServe)

Scientific classification
- Kingdom: Plantae
- Clade: Tracheophytes
- Clade: Angiosperms
- Clade: Monocots
- Order: Asparagales
- Family: Amaryllidaceae
- Subfamily: Allioideae
- Genus: Allium
- Species: A. plummerae

Binomial name
- Allium plummerae S.Wats.

Species of flowering plant

Allium plummerae is a species of plant native to southern Arizona (Pima and Cochise Counties) in the United States and to Sonora in Mexico. It is known by the common names Plummer's onion and Tanner's Canyon onion. It grows on rocky slopes and stream banks in mountains regions at elevations of 1600–2800 m.

Allium plummerae produces elongate bulbs up to 5 cm long but rarely more than 1.5 cm in diameter. Flowers are up to 10 mm across; tepals white or pink; anthers purple; pollen yellow.

The epithet "plummerae" is in honor of one member of the expedition that collected those specimens, botanist Sara Plummer Lemmon.
