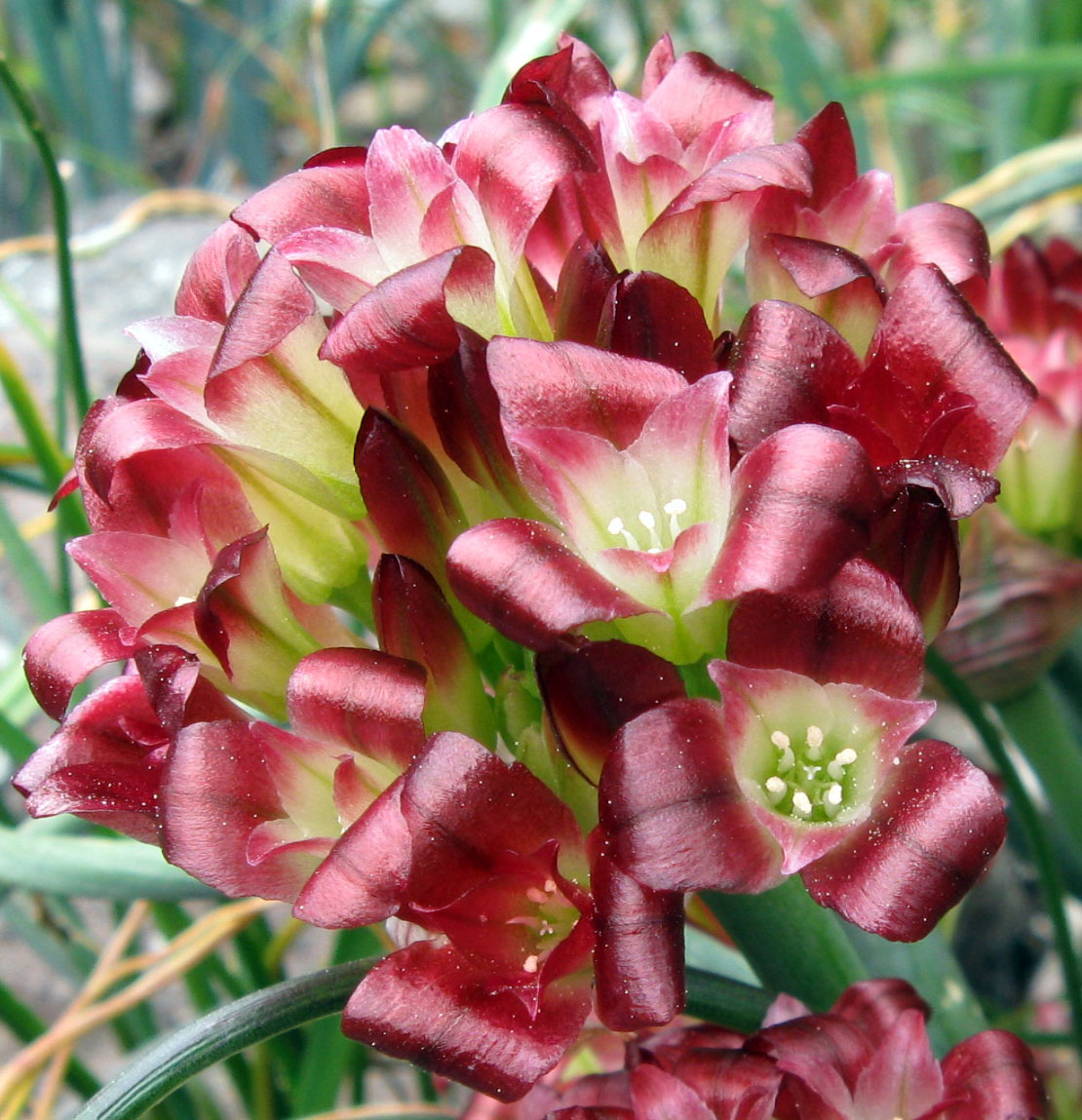

Conservation status
- Imperiled (NatureServe)

Scientific classification
- Kingdom: Plantae
- Clade: Tracheophytes
- Clade: Angiosperms
- Clade: Monocots
- Order: Asparagales
- Family: Amaryllidaceae
- Subfamily: Allioideae
- Genus: Allium
- Species: A. shevockii

Binomial name
- Allium shevockii McNeal

= Allium shevockii =

Spanish Needle onion

Species of flowering plant

Allium shevockii is a rare species of wild onion known by the common name Spanish needle onion. It is found only in a limited area in the southern Sierra Nevada of California.

== Description ==
Allium shevockii produces a bulb one to one and a half centimeters wide which may have one or two large daughter bulblets. Atop the stipe is an umbel of up to 30 flowers, each just over a centimeter wide. The six shiny tepals are maroon to rich pink in color and may be white near the bases. In a manner unique among the onions, the tepals are reflexed, curling outward from the flower center.

== Distribution ==
The plant is endemic to southern California. Known locations occur in Spanish Needle Peak and Horse Canyon in the mountains of Kern County. The populations on Spanish Needle Peak are north of Owens Peak in the Sierra Nevada, near the boundaries with Tulare and Inyo Counties.
