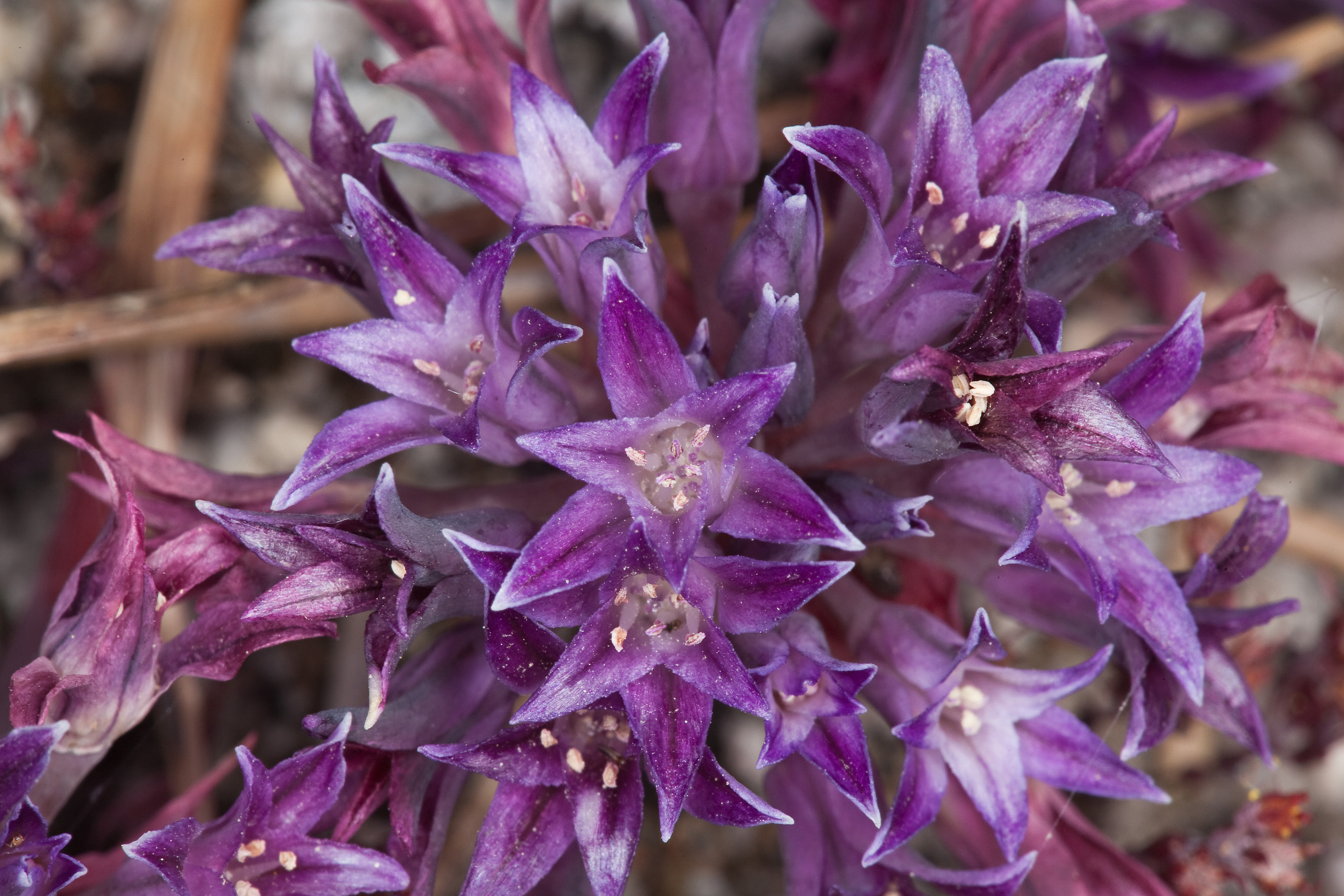

Conservation status
- Vulnerable (NatureServe)

Scientific classification
- Kingdom: Plantae
- Clade: Tracheophytes
- Clade: Angiosperms
- Clade: Monocots
- Order: Asparagales
- Family: Amaryllidaceae
- Subfamily: Allioideae
- Genus: Allium
- Species: A. abramsii

Binomial name
- Allium abramsii (Ownbey & Aase ex Traub) McNeal

Synonyms
- Allium fimbriatum var. abramsii Ownbey & Aase ex Traub

= Allium abramsii =

Species of flowering plant

Allium abramsii is a species of wild onion known by the common name Abrams' onion.

== Description ==
Allium abramsii grows from one or more bulbs each just over a centimeter wide attached to a thick rhizome. It reaches a maximum height of about 15 centimeters with usually one curving cylindrical leaf that may be up to a foot long. The inflorescence contains up to 40 pink or purplish flowers with lance-shaped tepals and yellow anthers.

== Taxonomy ==
The epithet abramsii commemorates LeRoy Abrams.

== Distribution and habitat ==
Allium abramsii is endemic to the central Sierra Nevada in California, where it grows in the coniferous forest understory in granite sand soils. It is found in Fresno, Madera and Tulare Counties at elevations of 1400–2000 m.
