= Allium perdulce =

Plains onion

Scientific classification
- Kingdom: Plantae
- Clade: Tracheophytes
- Clade: Angiosperms
- Clade: Monocots
- Order: Asparagales
- Family: Amaryllidaceae
- Subfamily: Allioideae
- Genus: Allium
- Species: A. perdulce

Binomial name
- Allium perdulce S.V.Fraser 1940

Species of flowering plant

Allium perdulce, the Plains onion, is a plant species native to the central part of the United States and cultivated as an ornamental elsewhere. It has been found in Texas, New Mexico, Oklahoma, Kansas, Nebraska, South Dakota, and one county in western Iowa (Woodbury County).

The species name, "perdulce", is neo Latin meaning "especially sweet". This is a reference to the scent of the flowers which resembles hyacinths.

Allium perdulceproduces 2-20 bulbs, each up to 3 cm (1.2 inches) in diameter. Flowers are urn-shaped, up to 10 mm (0.4 inches) across; tepals deep rose to purple (except in var. sperryi; see below); pollen yellow.

Two varieties are recognized:

- Allium perdulce var. perdulce
- Allium perdulce var. sperryi Ownbey

Var. sperryi is a color variant known only from western Texas in the trans-Pecos region. It has white to pale pink flowers instead of the more widespread deep rose to purple.

== Cultivation ==
The plains onion prefers sandy loam soil. Though tolerant of drought conditions they will make good use of some additional moisture when in cultivation.
