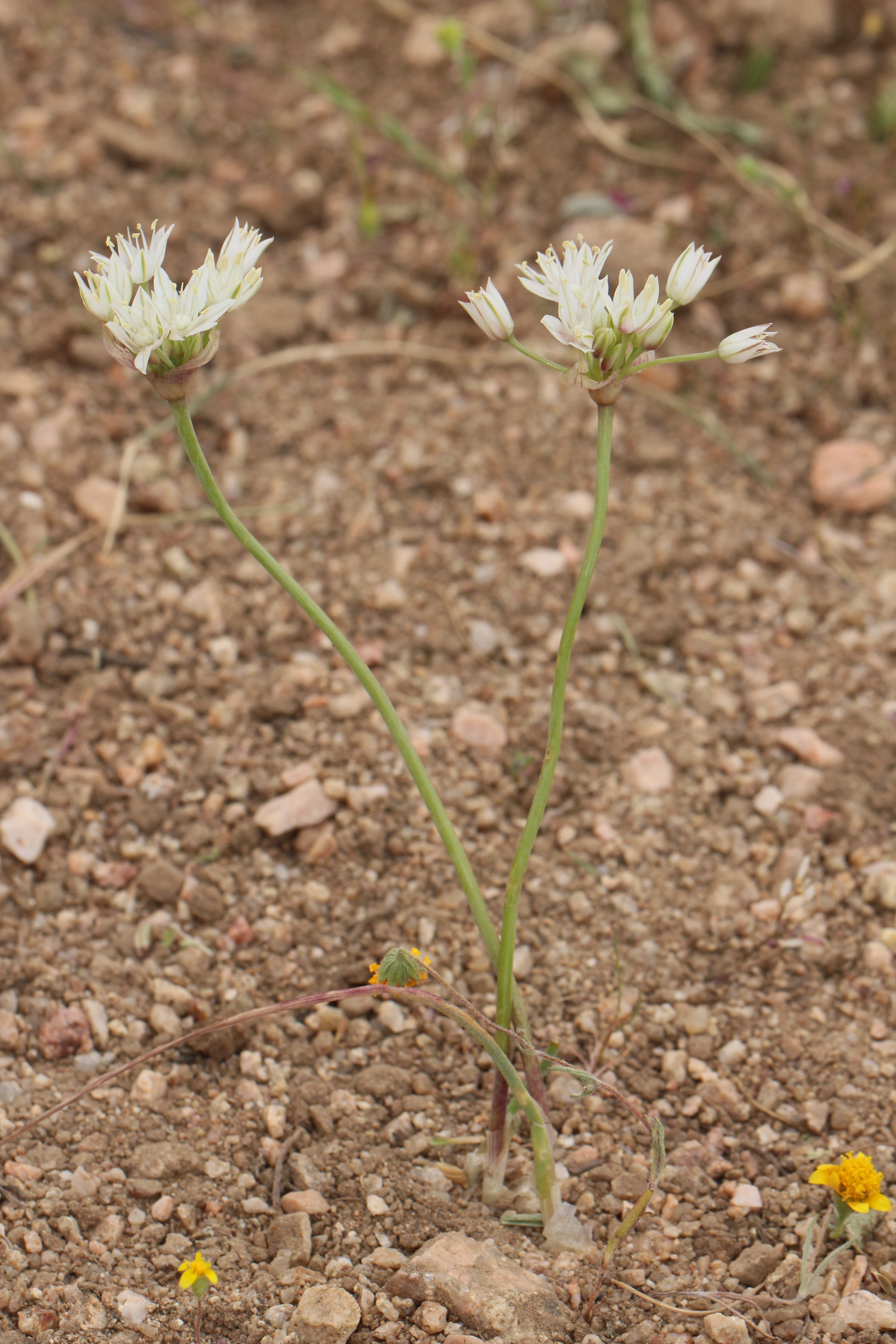
- Flowering specimen
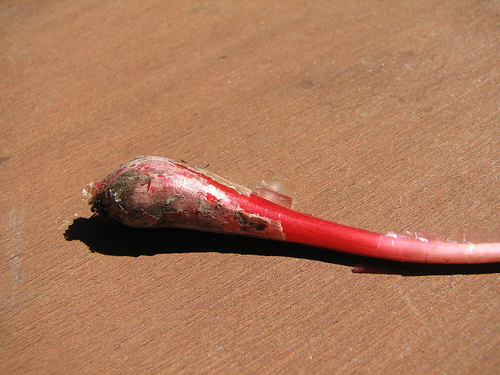
- Bulb

Conservation status
- Vulnerable (NatureServe)

Scientific classification
- Kingdom: Plantae
- Clade: Tracheophytes
- Clade: Angiosperms
- Clade: Monocots
- Order: Asparagales
- Family: Amaryllidaceae
- Subfamily: Allioideae
- Genus: Allium
- Species: A. haematochiton

Binomial name
- Allium haematochiton S.Wats.

Synonyms
- Allium californicum Rose; Allium marvinii Davidson

= Allium haematochiton =

Redskin onion

Species of flowering plant

Allium haematochiton is a North American species of wild onion known by the common name redskin onion. It is native to northern Baja California, Sonora, and southern California as far north as Kern County. It grows on the slopes of the hills and mountains, such as those of the Peninsular Ranges, Transverse Ranges, and southern California Coast Ranges.

== Description ==
Allium haematochiton has a small rhizome associated with clusters of brightly colored red bulbs. From these grow several naked green stems, each with a few withering, curling leaves.

Atop each stem is an inflorescence of several flowers, each on a short pedicel. Each flower is just under a centimeter wide and white to pinkish with dark midveins. There are six stout stamens around a white or pink ovary.
