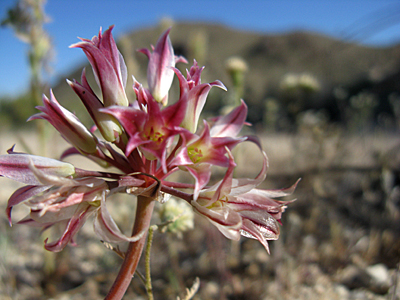

Conservation status
- Vulnerable (NatureServe)

Scientific classification
- Kingdom: Plantae
- Clade: Tracheophytes
- Clade: Angiosperms
- Clade: Monocots
- Order: Asparagales
- Family: Amaryllidaceae
- Subfamily: Allioideae
- Genus: Allium
- Species: A. parishii

Binomial name
- Allium parishii S.Wats.

= Allium parishii =

Species of flowering plant

Allium parishii is an uncommon species of wild onion known by the common name Parish's onion. It is native to the Mojave Desert and Sonoran Deserts of California (San Bernardino, Riverside, and San Diego Counties) and Arizona (Yuma and Mohave Counties). It grows on open dry, rocky slopes at elevations of 900–1,400 m (3,000–4,600 ft).

Allium parishii grows from a reddish-brown bulb just over a centimeter long and produces a scape up to about 25 centimeters tall. There is a single cylindrical leaf which is generally longer than the stem. The umbel contains up to 25 dark-veined pale pink flowers with narrow tepals between one and two centimeters long. Anthers and pollen are yellow.
