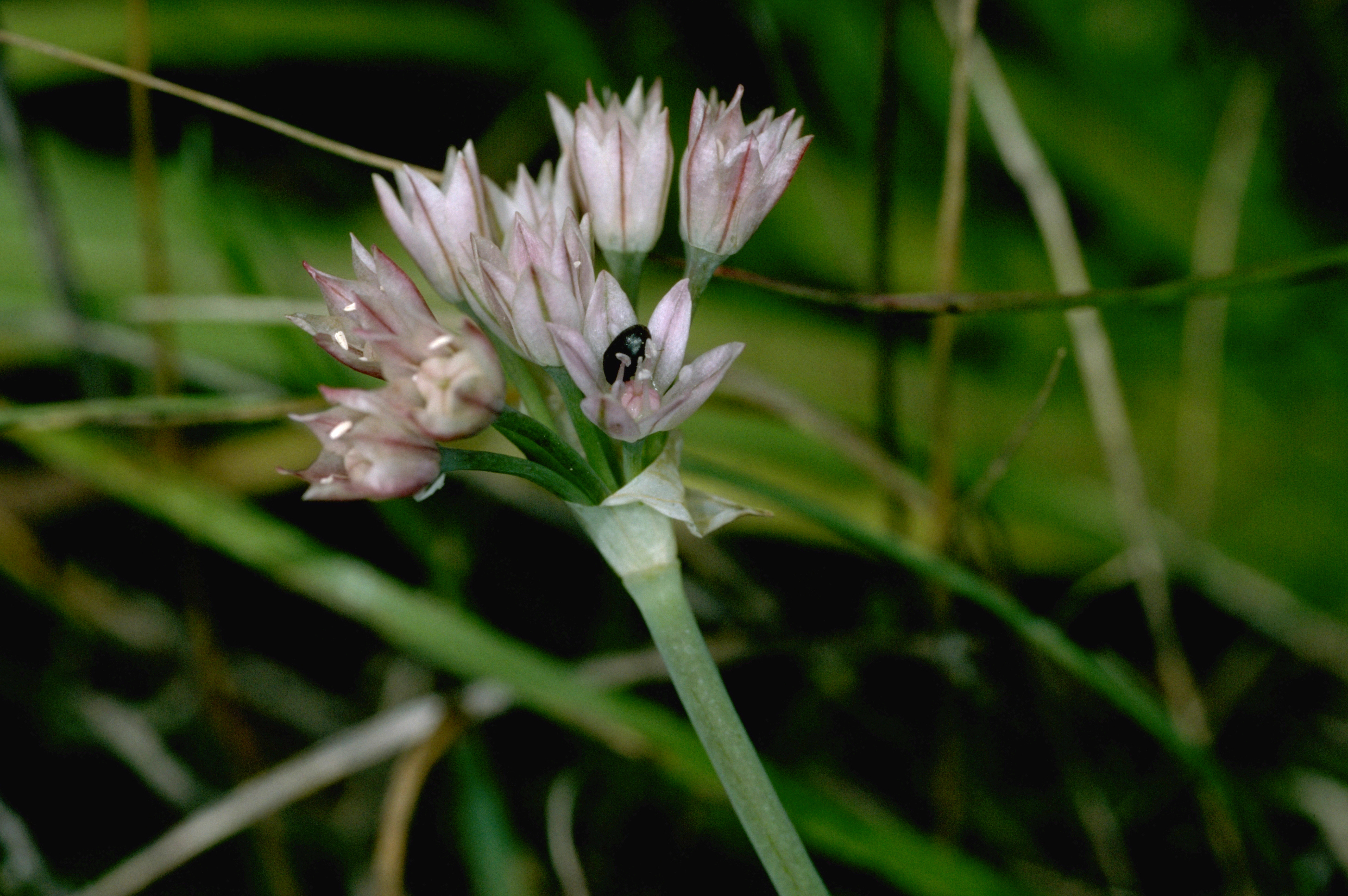

Conservation status
- Imperiled (NatureServe)

Scientific classification
- Kingdom: Plantae
- Clade: Tracheophytes
- Clade: Angiosperms
- Clade: Monocots
- Order: Asparagales
- Family: Amaryllidaceae
- Subfamily: Allioideae
- Genus: Allium
- Species: A. hickmanii

Binomial name
- Allium hickmanii Eastw.

Synonyms
- Allium hyalinum var. hickmanii (Eastw.) Jeps.

= Allium hickmanii =

Hickman's onion

Species of flowering plant

Allium hickmanii is a rare species of wild onion known by the common name Hickman's onion. It is endemic to California, where it is known from Monterey, and San Luis Obispo Counties.

== Description ==
Allium hickmanii grows from a pale brown or gray bulb about a centimeter long and produces a stem up to 17 centimeters tall. There are generally two long, cylindrical leaves which are longer than the stem. The inflorescence holds up to about 15 white or pinkish flowers each less than a centimeter long.
