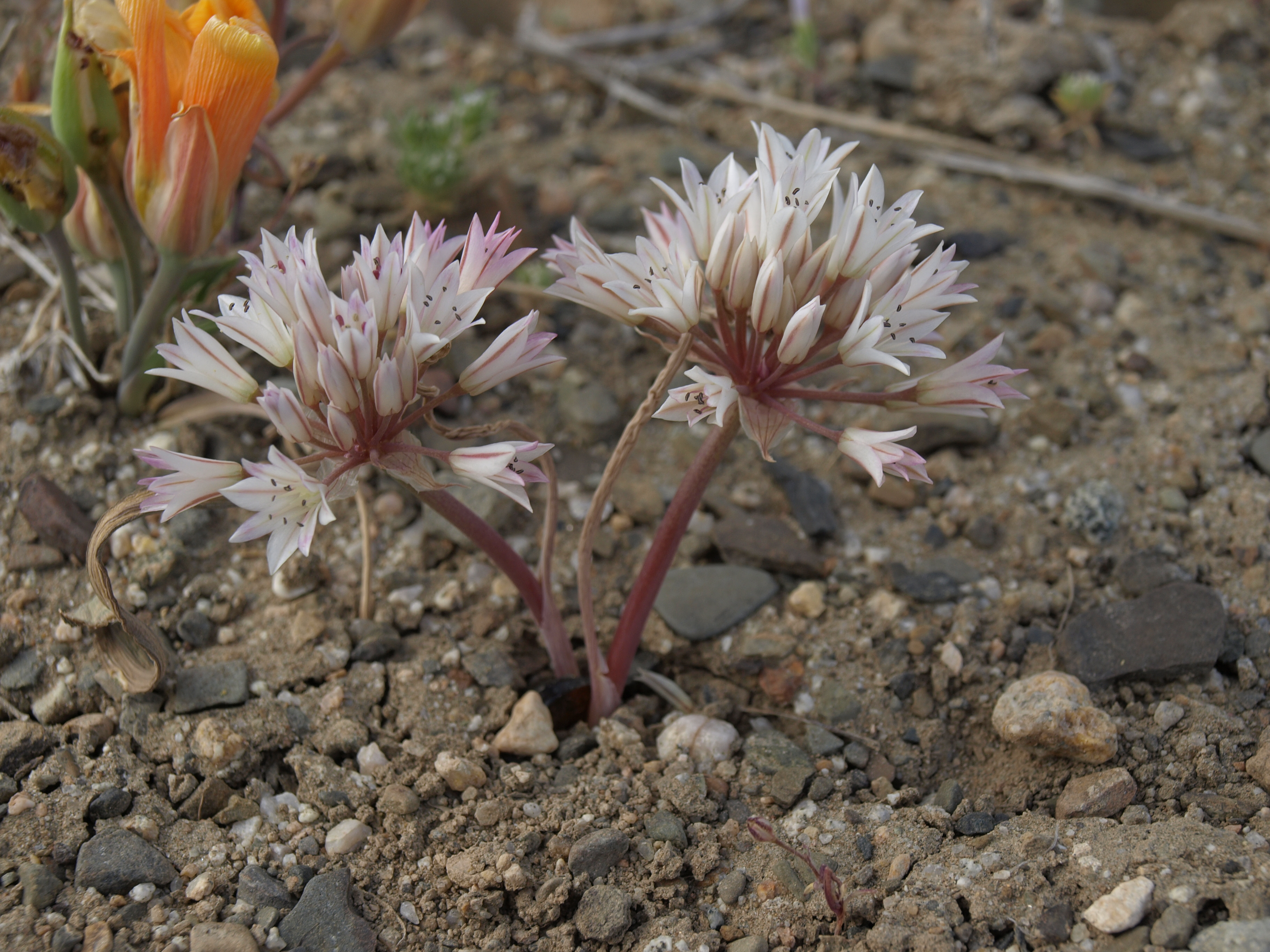
- Allium atrorubens found in the White Mountains in Esmeralda County, Nevada

Conservation status
- Apparently Secure (NatureServe)

Scientific classification
- Kingdom: Plantae
- Clade: Tracheophytes
- Clade: Angiosperms
- Clade: Monocots
- Order: Asparagales
- Family: Amaryllidaceae
- Subfamily: Allioideae
- Genus: Allium
- Subgenus: A. subg. Amerallium
- Species: A. atrorubens

Binomial name
- Allium atrorubens S.Watson

Varieties
- A. a. var. atrorubens; A. a. var. cristatum

Synonyms
- Allium cristatum; Allium decipiens; Allium inyonis

= Allium atrorubens =

Dark red onion

North American onion species

Allium atrorubens is a species of wild onion known by the common name dark red onion. This plant is native to the southwestern United States where it grows in the sandy soils of the Mojave Desert, the Great Basin and higher-elevation deserts in Nevada, eastern California (San Bernardino, Kern, Mono, Inyo and Lassen Counties) southwestern Utah (Kane, Millard and Beaver Counties), northwestern Arizona (Mohave and Coconino Counties).

Allium atrorubens grows from a reddish-brown bulb 1–1.5 cm (3/8–5/8 in) across. The stem is short and is surrounded by few coiled tubular leaves. Atop the stem is an inflorescence of up to 50 flowers. Each flower has six shiny, iridescent, sharply triangular tepals with dark midveins. The tepals are usually magenta to maroon but are lighter pink or white occasionally. Each flower is about 1 cm (3/8 in) wide.

== Taxonomy ==
In 1871 the botanist Sereno Watson scientifically described a new species in the Allium genus which he named Allium atrorubens. Along with its genus it is classified in the Amaryllidaceae family and according to Plants of the World Online it has two varieties.

- Allium atrorubens var. atrorubens – Native to California, Nevada, Arizona, and Utah
- Allium atrorubens var. cristatum – Also native to California, Nevada, Arizona, and Utah

Variety cristatum has seven synonyms.

Table of Synonyms
Name	Year	Rank	Notes
Allium atrorubens subsp. inyonis (M.E.Jones) Traub	1972	subspecies	= het.
Allium atrorubens var. inyonis (M.E.Jones) Ownbey & Aase	1977	variety	= het.
Allium cristatum S.Watson	1879	species	≡ hom.
Allium decipiens M.E.Jones	1902	species	= het., nom. illeg. homonym. post.
Allium inyonis M.E.Jones	1902	species	= het.
Allium nevadense subsp. cristatum (S.Watson) Traub & Ownbey	1967	subspecies	≡ hom.
Allium nevadense var. cristatum (S.Watson) Ownbey	1947	variety	≡ hom.
Notes: ≡ homotypic synonym ; = heterotypic synonym
