= Allium elmendorfii =

Conservation status
- Imperiled (NatureServe)

Scientific classification
- Kingdom: Plantae
- Clade: Tracheophytes
- Clade: Angiosperms
- Clade: Monocots
- Order: Asparagales
- Family: Amaryllidaceae
- Subfamily: Allioideae
- Genus: Allium
- Species: A. elmendorfii

Binomial name
- Allium elmendorfii M. E. Jones ex Ownbey

Species of flowering plant

Allium elmendorfii, or Elmendorf's onion, is a species of wild onion endemic to Texas. It is known only from Bexar, Frio, Wilson, and Atascosa Counties. It is generally found on sandy soils, specifically "well-drained sands, Eocene, Pleistocene and Holocene sands, and has only a 400 x 160 km range." Its habitat is "Forest/Woodland, Savanna, Woodland - Hardwood" and specifically "{g}rassland openings in post oak (Quercus stellata) woodlands on deep, well-drained sands derived from Queen City and similar Eocene formations."

Allium elmendorfii is a perennial bulb-forming herb with clusters of small bulbils around the roots, but without the dry papery outer layers that the domesticated onions have. It has an umbel of 10–30 erect to spreading flowers, each with 6 white to pinkish tepals about 5 cm (2 inches) long, flowering from March to April or May.

== Distribution ==
U.S. Distribution by County	*Extirpated/possibly extirpated: State / County Name (FIPS Code); TX / Atascosa (48013)*, Bee (48025)*, Bexar (48029)*, Gillespie (48171)*, Jim Wells (48249), Kenedy (48261)*, Live Oak (48297), Llano (48299)*, Nueces (48355), Refugio (48391), San Patricio (48409), Willacy (48489)*, Wilson (48493)

== Uses ==
Allium elmendorfii is related to the common domesticated onion, Allium cepa L., and has a similar aroma. It can be eaten in the same manner, as can most of the members of the genus.
