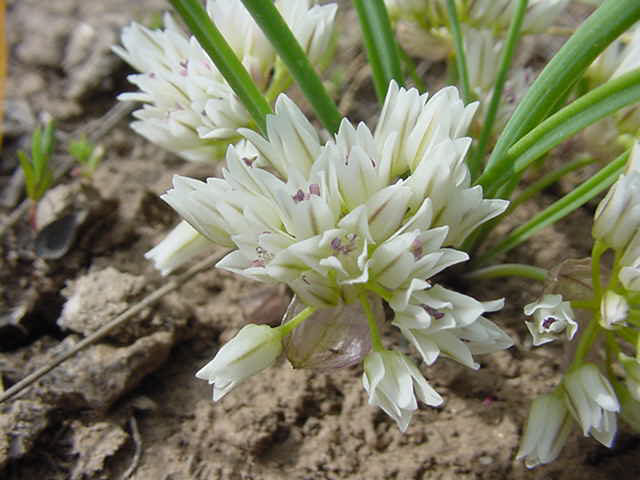
- Allium simillimum in southwest Idaho

Conservation status
- Apparently Secure (NatureServe)

Scientific classification
- Kingdom: Plantae
- Clade: Tracheophytes
- Clade: Angiosperms
- Clade: Monocots
- Order: Asparagales
- Family: Amaryllidaceae
- Subfamily: Allioideae
- Genus: Allium
- Species: A. simillimum

Binomial name
- Allium simillimum L.F. Hend.

= Allium simillimum =

Species of flowering plant

Allium simillimum, the simil onion, or dwarf onion, is a plant species native to Idaho and Montana (Gallatin and Ravalli Counties). It grows on sandy soils at high elevations in the mountains, 1800–3400 m.

Allium simillimum produces egg-shaped bulbs up to 1.7 cm long. Flowering stalks are rarely more than 5 cm tall. Flowers are bell-shaped, up to 10 mm across; tepals white with green or pink midribs; anthers purple; pollen white or gray.
