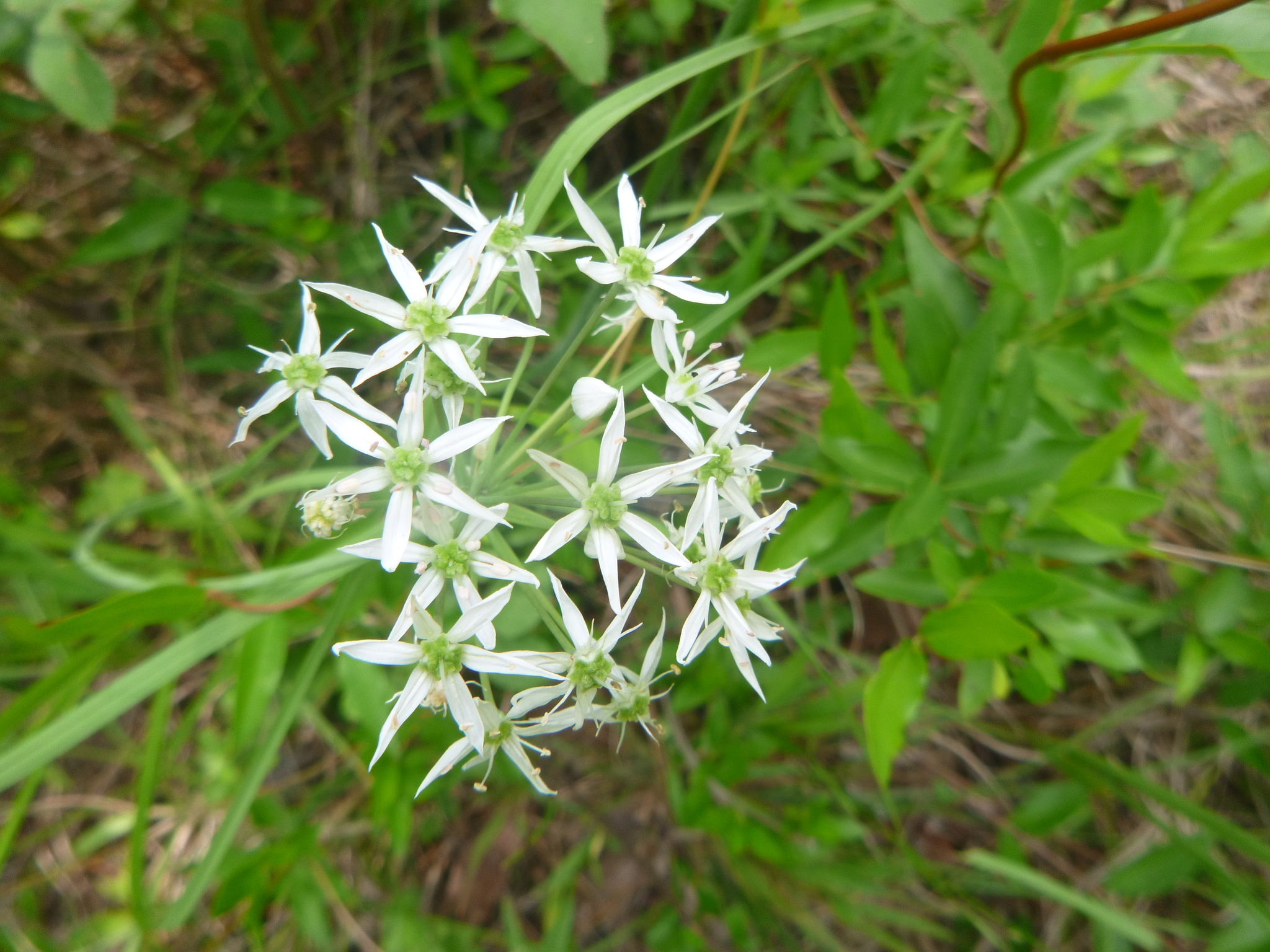

Conservation status
- Apparently Secure (NatureServe)

Scientific classification
- Kingdom: Plantae
- Clade: Tracheophytes
- Clade: Angiosperms
- Clade: Monocots
- Order: Asparagales
- Family: Amaryllidaceae
- Subfamily: Allioideae
- Genus: Allium
- Subgenus: A. subg. Amerallium
- Species: A. cuthbertii

Binomial name
- Allium cuthbertii Small

Synonyms
- Allium sanbornii var. jepsonii Ownbey & Aase ex Traub

= Allium cuthbertii =

Striped garlic

Species of flowering plant

Allium cuthbertii, common name striped garlic, is a plant species native to the southeastern United States. It occurs at elevations less than 300 m in Alabama, Georgia, North and South Carolina, and northeastern Florida. It is a perennial herb.

Allium cuthbertii produces egg-shaped bulbs up to 2 cm long. Scapes are round, triangular or square in cross-section, up to 40 cm tall. Flowers are about 8 mm across, white, pink or purple; anthers and pollen yellow.
