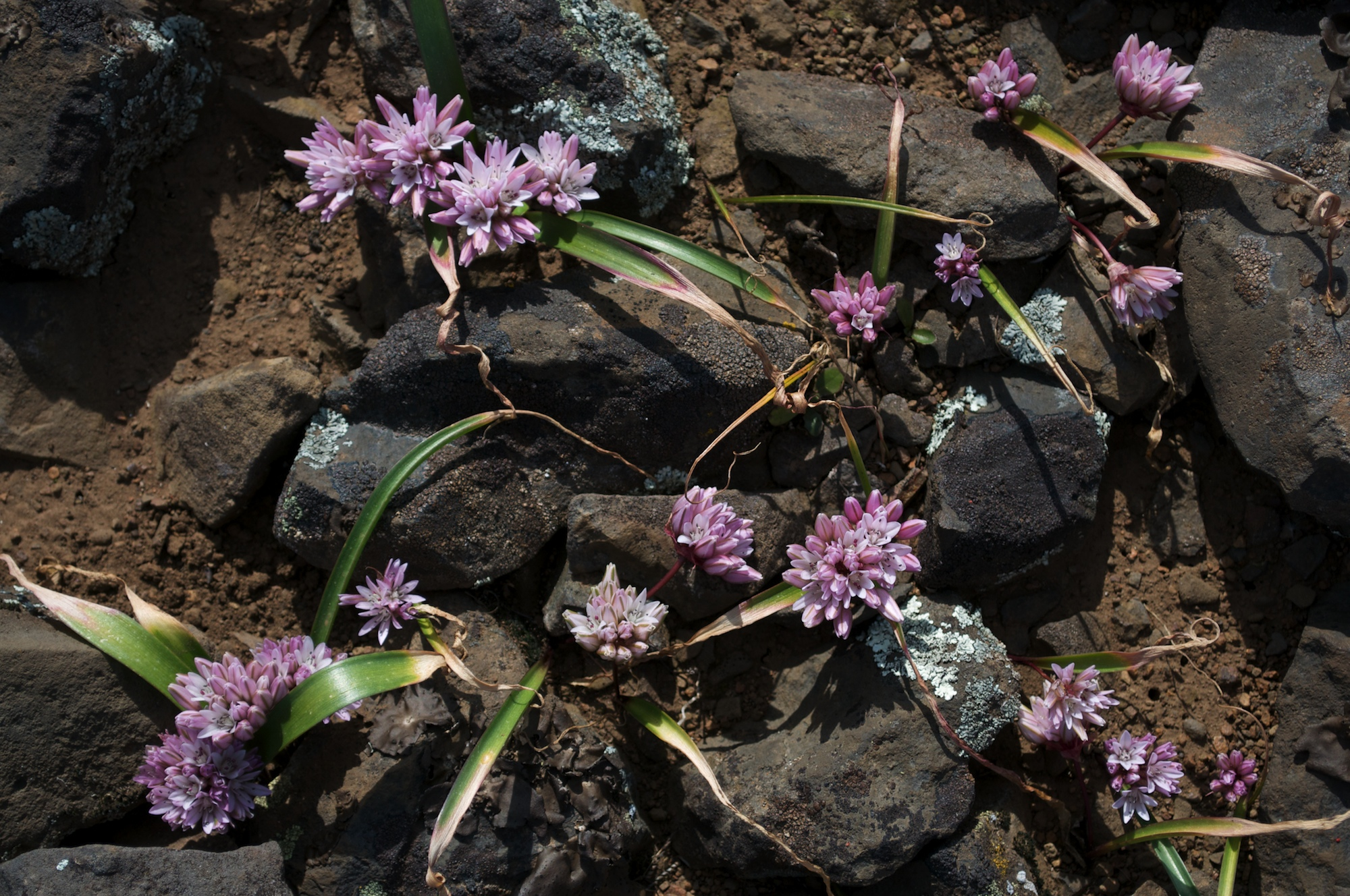

Conservation status
- Vulnerable (NatureServe)

Scientific classification
- Kingdom: Plantae
- Clade: Tracheophytes
- Clade: Angiosperms
- Clade: Monocots
- Order: Asparagales
- Family: Amaryllidaceae
- Subfamily: Allioideae
- Genus: Allium
- Species: A. cratericola

Binomial name
- Allium cratericola Eastw.

Synonyms
- Allium parvum var. brucae M.E. Jones; Allium parvum var. jacintense Munz

= Allium cratericola =

Cascade onion

Species of flowering plant

Allium cratericola is a species of wild onion known by the common name Cascade onion. It is endemic to California, where is an uncommon member of the flora in several of the state's mountain ranges, including the northern and southern California Coast Ranges, the western Transverse Ranges, Klamath Mountains, and the Sierra Nevada foothills. Its range covers much of the state, from Riverside County to Siskiyou County.

== Description ==
Allium cratericola grows a short stem up to 10 centimetres (4 in) tall from a brown-coated oval-shaped bulb. There are one or two long, pointed leaves up to four times the length of the stem. The umbel contains up to 20 flowers clustered densely together. Each flower is bell-shaped, up to 15 mm (5/8 in) across; tepals white, pink or purplish with a dark purple-brown midvein; anthers and pollen are yellow.
