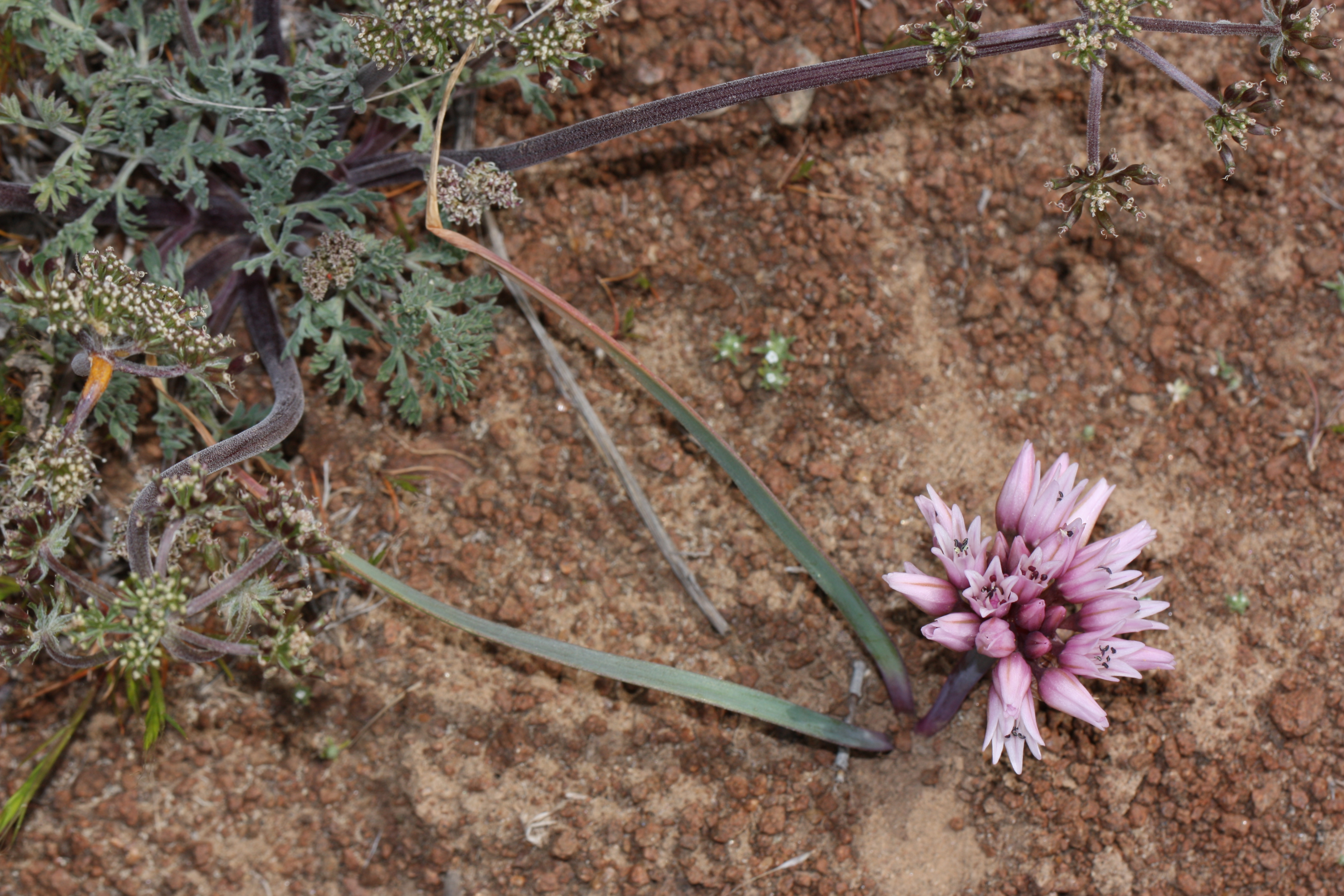
- Allium robinsonii in Grant County, Washington

Conservation status
- Vulnerable (NatureServe)

Scientific classification
- Kingdom: Plantae
- Clade: Tracheophytes
- Clade: Angiosperms
- Clade: Monocots
- Order: Asparagales
- Family: Amaryllidaceae
- Subfamily: Allioideae
- Genus: Allium
- Species: A. robinsonii

Binomial name
- Allium robinsonii L.F. Hend.

= Allium robinsonii =

Columbia River onion

Species of flowering plant

Allium robinsonii, the Columbia River onion or Robinson's onion, is a rare plant species native to the US States of Washington and Oregon, although some studies suggest that the Oregon populations may now be extinct. The species has been reported from five counties in Washington (Ferry, Yakima, Grant, Franklin and Benton) and five in Oregon (Umatilla, Morrow, Gilliam, Sherman and Wasco). It is found in sand and gravel deposits along the lower Columbia River and some of its tributaries, usually at elevations less than 200 m. The species is also cultivated as an ornamental in other regions, including in Europe.

Allium robinsonii produces 1–3 egg-shaped bulbs up to 2 cm long, but no underground rhizomes. The flowering stalks are relatively short for the genus, rarely more than 8 cm tall. The flowers are bell-shaped, up to 9 mm across; tepals are white to pale pink with red midrib; anthers purple; pollen yellow or gray; ovary crested. The plant is named in honor of B. L. Robinson of the Gray Herbarium of Harvard University. The leaves are flat and succulent, remaining during flowering.
