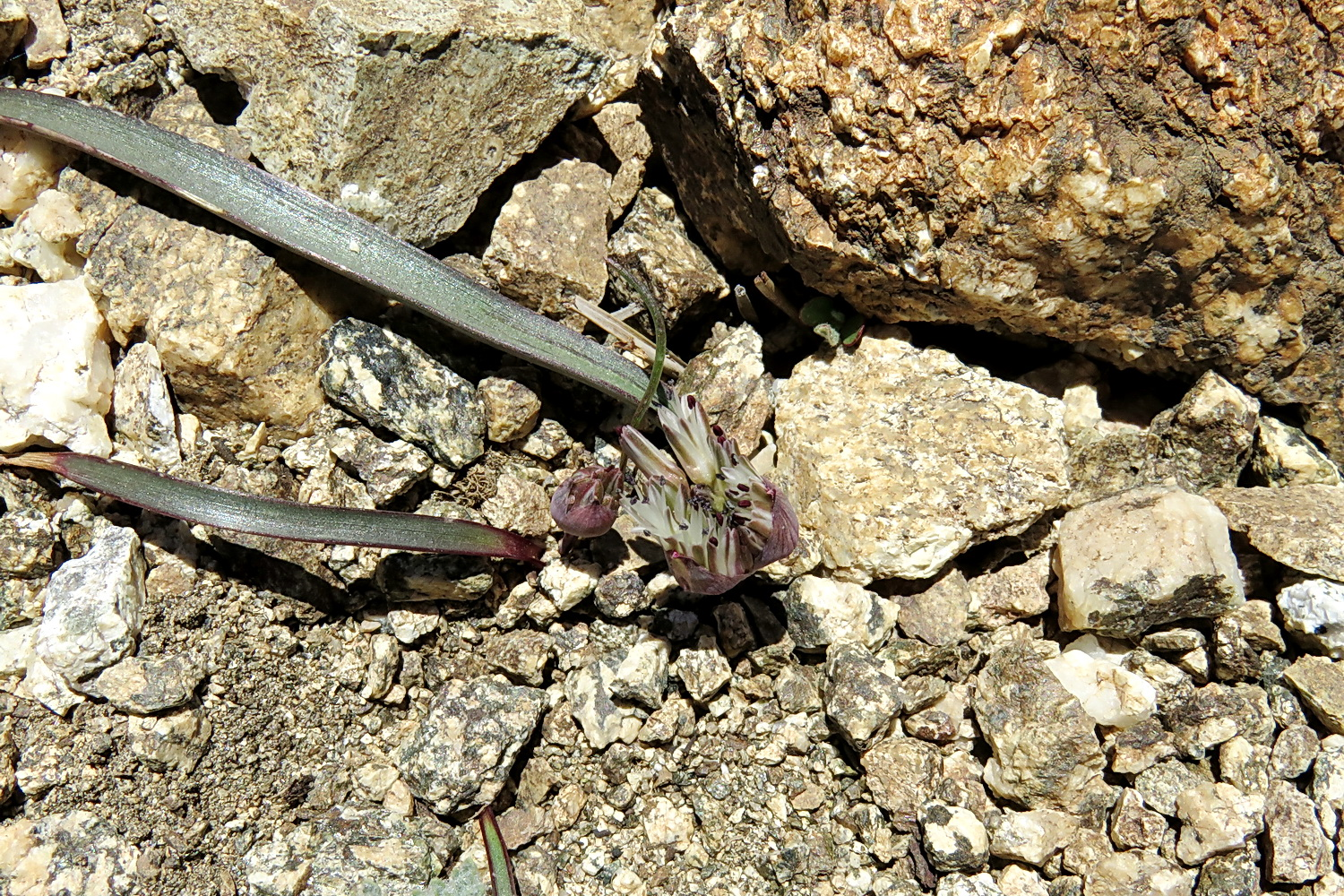
- Allium burlewii on Mount San Antonio, California

Conservation status
- Vulnerable (NatureServe)

Scientific classification
- Kingdom: Plantae
- Clade: Tracheophytes
- Clade: Angiosperms
- Clade: Monocots
- Order: Asparagales
- Family: Amaryllidaceae
- Subfamily: Allioideae
- Genus: Allium
- Species: A. burlewii

Binomial name
- Allium burlewii Davidson

= Allium burlewii =

Burlew's onion

Species of flowering plant

Allium burlewii is a species of wild onion known by the common name Burlew's onion. It is endemic to California, where grows in the granitic soils of several of the central and southern mountain ranges from Riverside and San Bernardino to Fresno and Monterey Counties, usually between 6,000 and 10,000 feet above sea level.

Allium burlewii is a short-stemmed onion, from an oval-shaped bulb, with a scape rarely taller than 20 cm. It has a single long, pointed leaf up to 35 cm long. The inflorescence contains up to 20 dark-veined purple flowers each up to a centimeter long with dark purple anthers.
