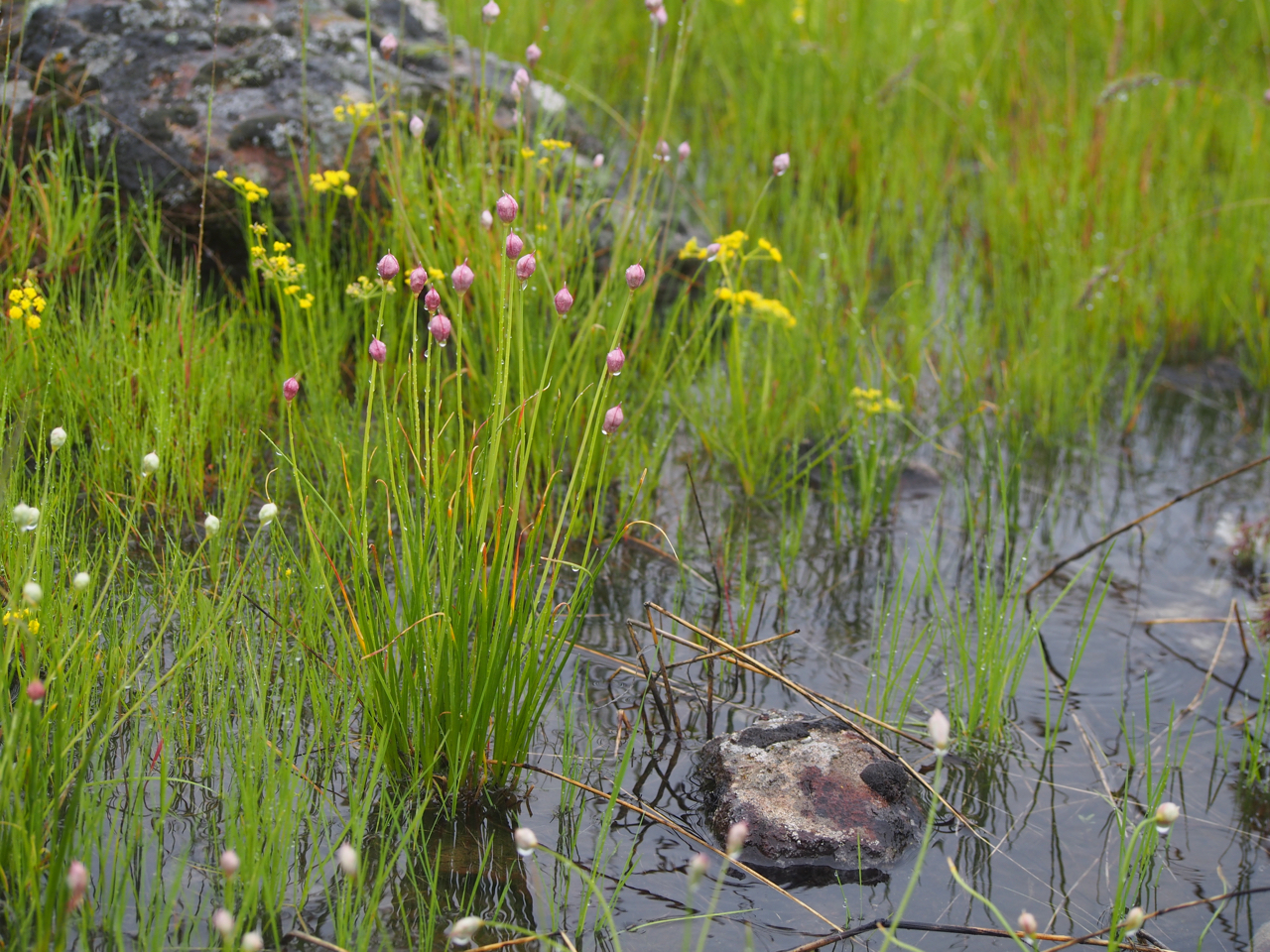
- Allium douglasii in Lincoln County, Washington, US

Conservation status
- Apparently Secure (NatureServe)

Scientific classification
- Kingdom: Plantae
- Clade: Tracheophytes
- Clade: Angiosperms
- Clade: Monocots
- Order: Asparagales
- Family: Amaryllidaceae
- Subfamily: Allioideae
- Genus: Allium
- Species: A. douglasii

Binomial name
- Allium douglasii Hook.

Synonyms
- Allium hendersonii B.L.Rob. & Seaton

= Allium douglasii =

Douglas' Onion

Species of flowering plant

Allium douglasii, the Douglas' onion, is a perennial herbaceous flowering plant in the Amaryllidaceae family. It is native to northeastern Oregon, eastern Washington, and northern Idaho.

== Description ==
Allium douglasii is a perennial herbaceous flowering plant that produces egg-shaped bulbs up to 3 cm (1 1/4 in) long. Scapes are round in cross-section, up to 40 cm (16 in) tall. Flowers are up to 10 mm (3/8 in) across; tepals pink or purple with green midribs; anthers blue; pollen white or light gray. Two grooved leaves usually remain during the flowering stage.

== Distribution and habitat ==
Allium douglasii is endemic to sections of the Northwestern United States (northeastern Oregon, Idaho, eastern Washington). It typically grows in shallow soils at elevations of 400–1,300 m (1,300–4,300 ft) above sea level.

== Conservation ==
As of December 2024, the conservation group NatureServe listed Allium douglasii as Apparently Secure (G4) worldwide. This status was last reviewed on 7 August 1984. At the state level, this species is listed as No Status Rank (not assessed) in Idaho and Oregon, and as Secure (G5) in Washington.

== Taxonomy ==
Allium douglasii was first named and described by William Jackson Hooker in 1838 in the Flora Boreali-Americana publication

=== Etymology ===
The specific epithet, douglasii, is named in honour of scottish botanist David Douglas. In English, this species is commonly known as Douglas' Onion.
