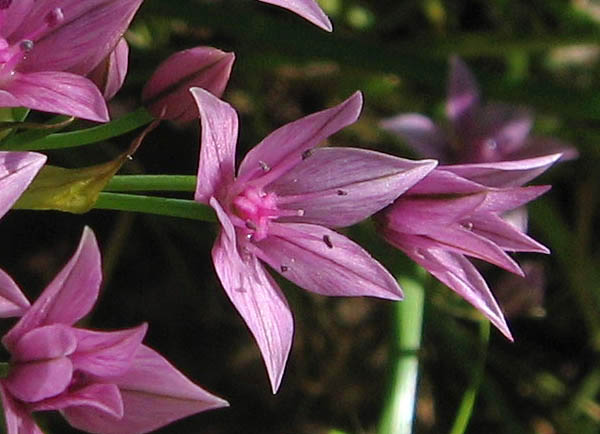

Scientific classification
- Kingdom: Plantae
- Clade: Tracheophytes
- Clade: Angiosperms
- Clade: Monocots
- Order: Asparagales
- Family: Amaryllidaceae
- Subfamily: Allioideae
- Genus: Allium
- Subgenus: A. subg. Amerallium
- Species: A. praecox

Binomial name
- Allium praecox Brandegee

Synonyms
- Allium hyalinum var. praecox (Brandegee) Jeps.

= Allium praecox =

Species of flowering plant

Allium praecox is a species of wild onion known by the common name early onion.

== Distribution ==
It is native to the hills and mountains of southern California and Baja California, where it grows in shady areas in clay soils at elevations up to 800 m.

The species has been recorded in Kern, San Bernardino, Los Angeles, Riverside, Santa Barbara, Orange and San Diego Counties. This includes some populations on the Channel Islands.

== Description ==
Allium praecox grows from a brownish or grayish bulb between one and two centimeters long. The scape is round in cross-section, up to 60 cm long. A single plant generally has two or three long, keeled leaves about the same length as the scape or sometimes a little longer.

The umble consists of up to 40 flowers, each on a long pedicel up to 4 cm long, the flowers up to 15 mm across. The tepals are pink with darker purple veins. Anthers are purple or yellow; pollen yellow.
