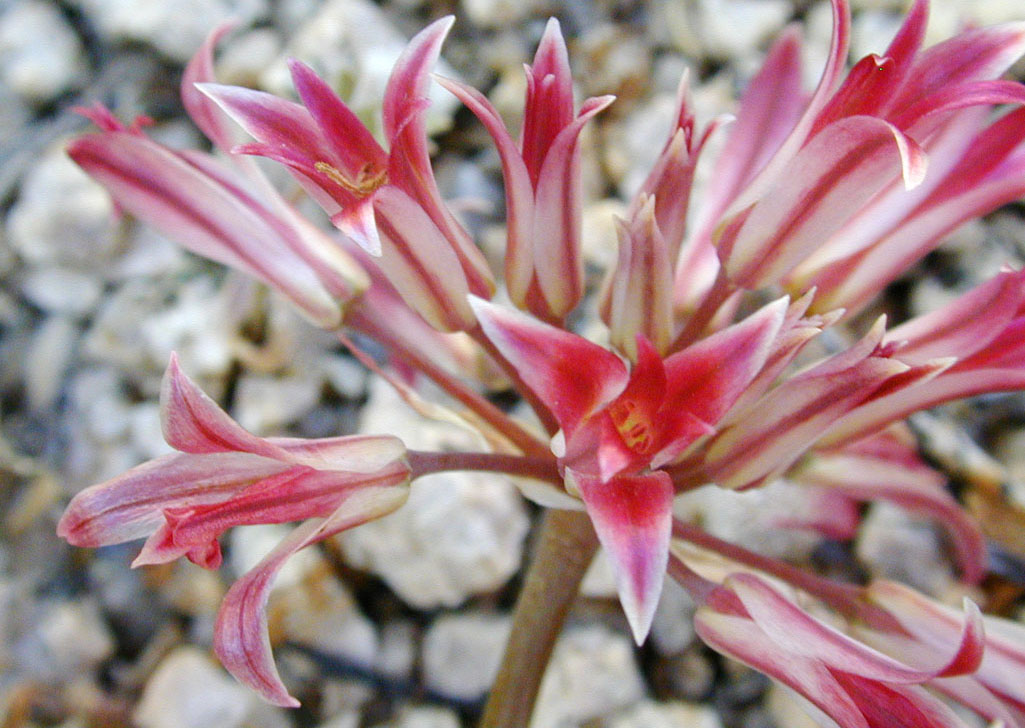

Scientific classification
- Kingdom: Plantae
- Clade: Tracheophytes
- Clade: Angiosperms
- Clade: Monocots
- Order: Asparagales
- Family: Amaryllidaceae
- Subfamily: Allioideae
- Genus: Allium
- Subgenus: A. subg. Amerallium
- Species: A. fimbriatum

Binomial name
- Allium fimbriatum S.Wats. 1879 not Schischk. 1929

Synonyms
- Allium anserinum Jeps.; Allium denticulatum (Ownbey & Aase ex Traub) McNeal 1992, illegitimate homonym not Kit. 1863; Allium mohavense (Jeps.) Tidestr.; Allium purdyi Eastw.

= Allium fimbriatum =

Fringed onion

Species of flowering plant

Allium fimbriatum is a species of wild onion known by the common name fringed onion. It is native to California and Baja California.

The fringed onion grows from a reddish-brown bulb one to two centimeters wide and sends up a naked brown or green stem. Atop the stem is an inflorescence of up to 75 flowers, each just under a centimeter wide on average. The flowers are variable in color, from pink to purple and often with white areas. The tepals are also variable in shape, from narrow and pointy to spade-shaped.

Varieties

Numerous names have been proposed for subspecies and varieties, most of them now regarded as distinct species. The following are accepted by the World Checklist.

- Allium fimbriatum var. denticulatum Ownbey & Aase ex Traub
- Allium fimbriatum var. fimbriatum
- Allium fimbriatum var. mohavense Jeps.
- Allium fimbriatum var. purdyi (Eastw.) Ownbey ex McNeal
