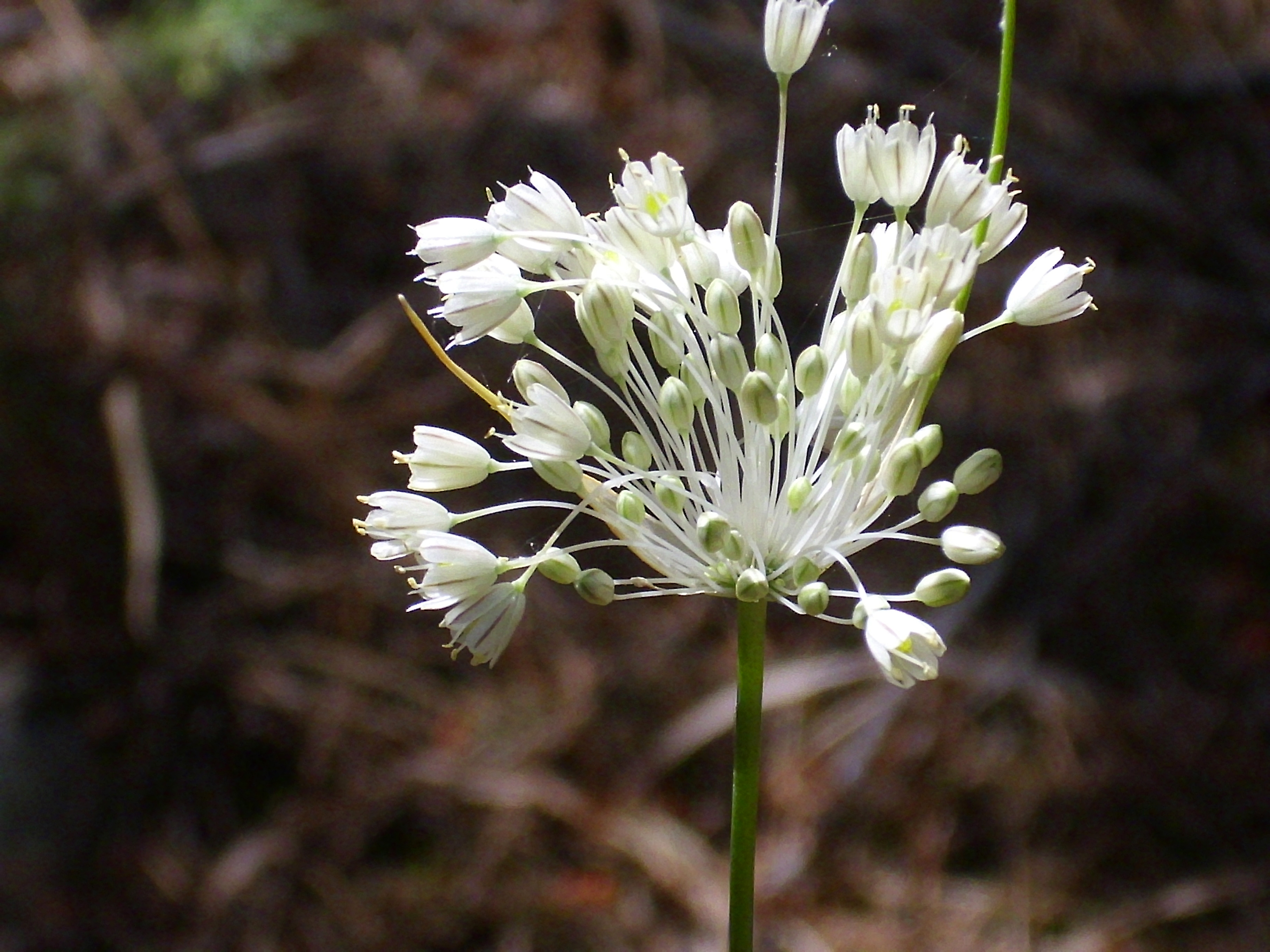

Scientific classification
- Kingdom: Plantae
- Clade: Embryophytes
- Clade: Tracheophytes
- Clade: Spermatophytes
- Clade: Angiosperms
- Clade: Monocots
- Order: Asparagales
- Family: Amaryllidaceae
- Subfamily: Allioideae
- Genus: Allium
- Subgenus: A. subg. Allium
- Species: A. pallens

Binomial name
- Allium pallens L. 1762 not Rchb. 1848.

Synonyms
- Synonymy: Allium amblyanthum Zahar.; Allium coppoleri Tineo; Allium pallens var. coppoleri (Tineo) Parl.; Allium pallens subsp. coppoleri (Tineo) Nyman; Allium paniculatum var. excedens H.Lindb.; Allium paniculatum var. pallens (L.) Gren. & Gord.; Allium paniculatum subsp. pallens (L.) K.Richt.; Allium paniculatum subsp. stearnii (Pastor & Valdés) O.Bolòs, Masalles & Vigo; Allium paniculatum var. tenuiflorum Rouy; Allium serbicum Vis. & Pancic; Allium stearnii Pastor & Valdés; Allium stramineum var. nigropedunculatum Oppenh.; Kalabotis pallens (L.) Raf.; Raphione pallens (L.) Salisb.

= Allium pallens =

Species of flowering plant

Allium pallens is a species of wild onion native to the Mediterranean region and Middle East from Portugal and Algeria to Iran.

== Description ==
Allium pallens produces a single egg-shaped bulb. Scape is up to 50 cm tall, round in cross-section. Leaves are long, narrow, and fleshy. Flowers are bell-shaped, some nodding while others in the same umbel erect, the tepals white or pale purple with prominent green or purple midveins.

== Taxonomy ==
A. paniculatum is placed within section Codonoprasum, subgenus Allium. There is some degree of uncertainty with regards to the relationships of taxa within the section. The Plant List gives A. pallens as an accepted name, but The World Checklist of Selected Plant Families treats it as a subspecies of Allium paniculatum, Allium paniculatum subsp. pallens (L.) K.Richt. Furthermore, a number of synonyms listed in The Plant List, such as Allium sternii, are treated as separate species by The World Checklist.

Taxa formerly included

- Allium pallens var. grandiflorum, now called Allium litardierei
- Allium pallens var. pseudooleraceum, now called Allium oleraceum
- Allium pallens var. savii, now called Allium savii
- Allium pallens subsp. siciliense, now called Allium lehmannii
- Allium pallens subsp. tenuiflorum, now called Allium tenuiflorum
