= Allium petraeum =

石坡韭 shi po jiu Лук щебнистый

Scientific classification
- Kingdom: Plantae
- Clade: Tracheophytes
- Clade: Angiosperms
- Clade: Monocots
- Order: Asparagales
- Family: Amaryllidaceae
- Subfamily: Allioideae
- Genus: Allium
- Species: A. petraeum

Binomial name
- Allium petraeum Kar. & Kir. 1842 not Genty 1889 (syn of A. lusitanicum)

Synonyms
- Allium globosum subsp. petraeum (Kar. & Kir.) K.Richt.

Species of flowering plant

Allium petraeum is an Asian species of wild onion native to Xinjiang, Kyrgyzstan, and Kazakhstan. It occurs on cliff faces and other sun-lit rocky places.

Allium petraeum has a cluster of narrow bulbs, each up to 15 mm across. Scape is up to 50 cm tall. Leaves are tubular, just a bit shorter than the scape, about 1 mm in diameter. Umbel is spherical with a dense cluster of yellow flowers. Tepals are pale yellow to bright lemon yellow, each with a green midvein.
