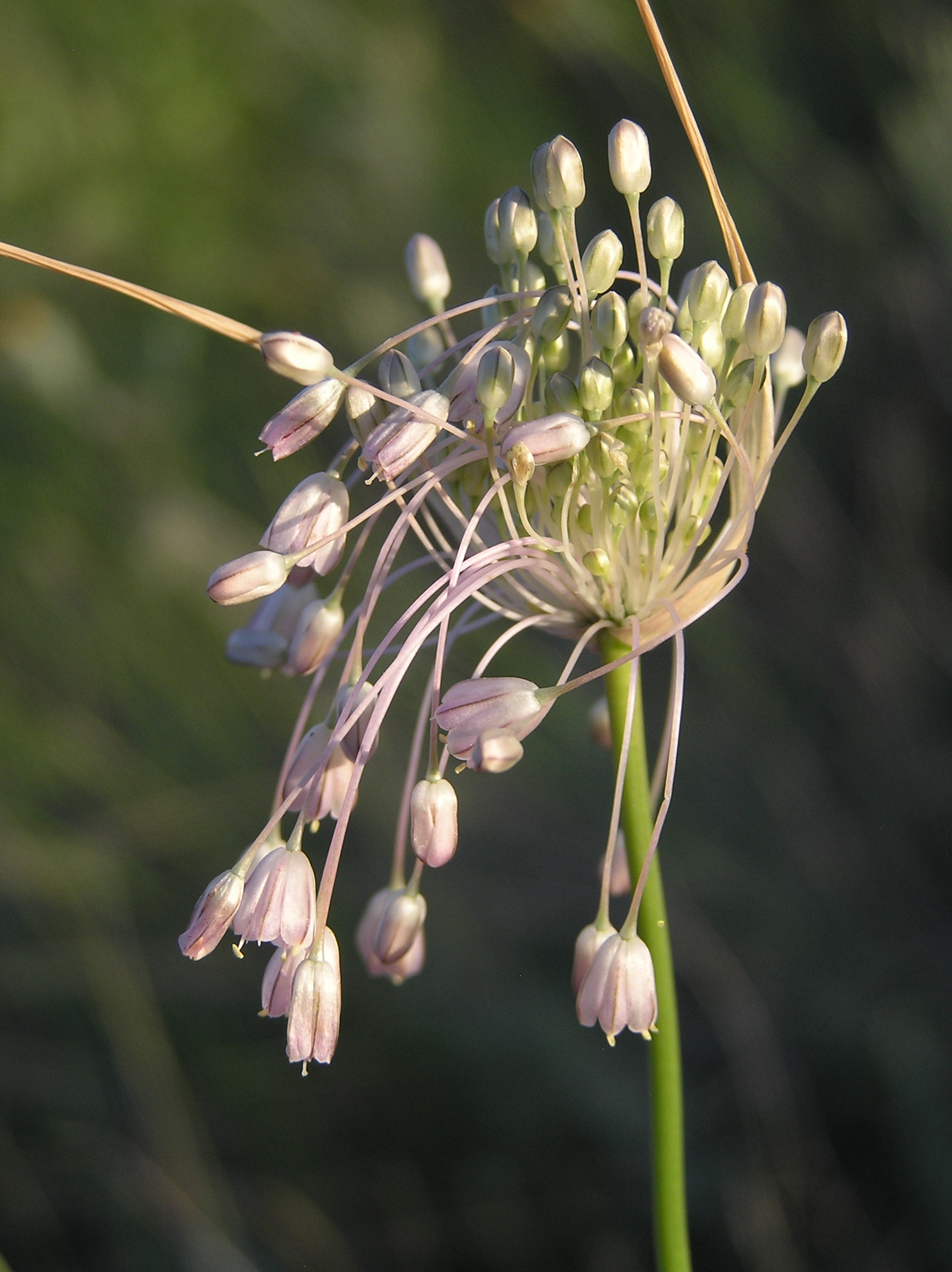

Scientific classification
- Kingdom: Plantae
- Clade: Tracheophytes
- Clade: Angiosperms
- Clade: Monocots
- Order: Asparagales
- Family: Amaryllidaceae
- Subfamily: Allioideae
- Genus: Allium
- Subgenus: A. subg. Allium
- Species: A. paniculatum

Binomial name
- Allium paniculatum L. (1759)

Synonyms
- Species synonymy: Allium acutiflorum Bové ex Regel (1875), not validly publ; Allium albidum C.Presl (1822), nom. illeg.; Allium pallens subsp. paniculatum (L.) Arcang. (1882); Allium paniculatum var. caucasicum Regel (1875); Allium paniculatum subsp. caucasicum (Regel) K.Richt. (1890); Allium paniculatum subsp. genuinum Cout. (1913), not validly publ.; Allium paniculatum var. legitimum Ledeb. (1852), not validly publ.; Allium paniculatum subsp. paniculatum; Allium paniculatum var. typicum Regel (1875), not validly publ.; Cepa paniculata (L.) Moench (1794); Kalabotis paniculatum (L.) Raf. (1837); Porrum paniculatum (L.) Moench (1802); Raphione paniculata (L.) Salisb. (1866), not validly publ.

= Allium paniculatum =

Species of flowering plant

Allium paniculatum, common name pale garlic, is a species of monocot in the family Amaryllidaceae. It is widely cultivated and is now naturalized in several places outside its native range.

== Description ==
Allium paniculatum produces several egg-shaped bulbs, each up to 1.5 cm across. It has no rhizomes. Leaves are tubular and hollow, up to 35 cm long. Scape is round in cross-section, solid, up to 75 cm tall. Inflorescence is (despite the name of the species referring to a panicle) an umbel with as many as 100 flowers. Flowers are bell-shaped, about 6 mm across; tepals white to lilac; pollen and anthers yellow.

== Taxonomy ==
A. paniculatum is placed within section Codonoprasum, subgenus Allium. The species has been regarded as highly variable, with up to 30 taxa included in what has been referred to as the A. paniculatum complex, many of which are now regarded as separate species within the section, including Allium dentiferum, A. fuscum, A. galileum, A. oleraceum, A. pallens, and A. tenuiflorum.

Many taxa from within the section have been incorrectly attributed to this species causing uncertainty regarding morphological diversity and geographic distribution. For instance, the species has been described as widely spread through the whole Euro-Mediterranean and Irano-Turanian areas, as well as in North Africa. However, the type specimen comes from Ukraine and South Russia.

Phylogenetically, A. paniculatum is in a sister relationship with three other species, namely A. oleraceum and the two western autumnal taxa, A. savii and A. telmatum, forming a subclade within the section.

== Distribution and habitat ==
Allium paniculatum has been reported from every European country bordering on the Black and Mediterranean Seas, including the islands of Corsica, Sardinia, Sicily and Crete. It is also considered native in Portugal, the Czech Republic, Hungary, western Siberia, Kazakhstan, Armenia, Georgia, Azerbaijan, Iran, Iraq, Lebanon, Syria, Israel, and Palestine. It has become naturalized in California, New York State, Azores, Madeira, Canary Islands, and South Australia. Recent phylogenetic studies demonstrate that the species' true distribution is in the countries around the Black and Caspian seas, including Bulgaria, Ukraine and Crimea, European Russia, the Caucasus, Iraq, Iran, Kazakhstan, and western Siberia.

In European Russia, Ukraine, and Crimea it is typically found in dry grasslands (steppes), including on ancient burial mounds, where it grows association with other steppe plants.

The species has been collected in the vicinity of San Francisco Bay in California, as well as isolated locales in Essex County in northeastern New York State. This is of concern because the species has the potential to become a noxious weed. It tends to grow in disturbed sites such as roadsides, cultivated fields, etc.
