= A. montanum =

A. montanum may refer to:

- Aecidium montanum, a rust fungus
- Allium montanum, a flowering plant
- Altagonum montanum, a ground beetle
- Alyssum montanum, a flowering plant
- Anadendrum montanum, an epiphytic or epipetric flowering plant of Indonesia
- Anthurium montanum, a flowering plant of Central America
- Aridarum montanum, an aquatic plant of Borneo
- Aspidodiadema montanum, a sea urchin
- Asplenium montanum, a fern of the eastern United States
