= Allium montanum =

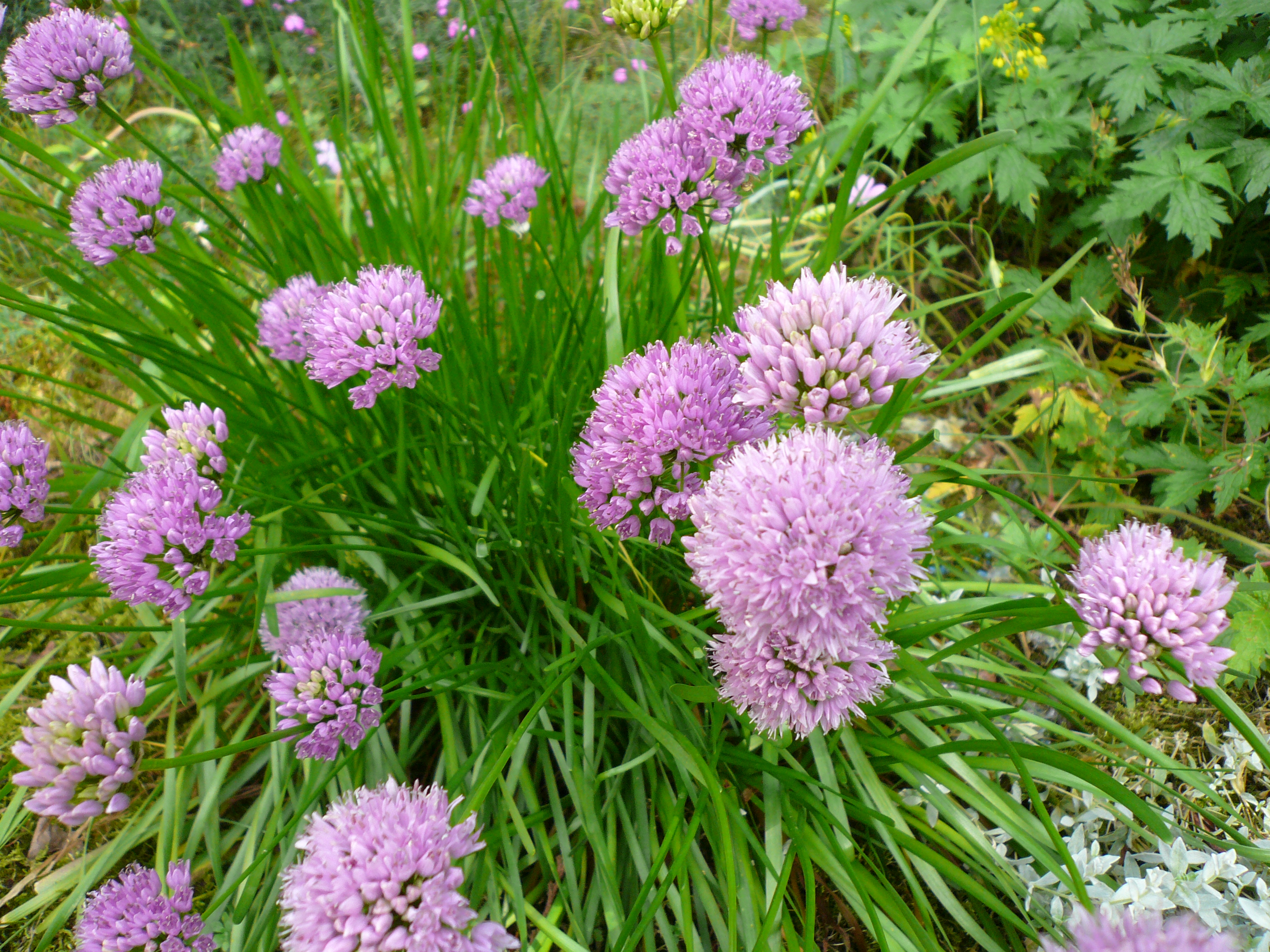
Allium lusitanicum

The scientific name Allium montanum has been used for at least six different species of Allium.

- Allium montanum Schrank – the only legitimate name, first used in 1785, now considered a synonym of Allium schoenoprasum (chives)

The following names are synonyms for other species:

- Allium montanum F.W.Schmidt, nom. illeg. = Allium lusitanicum
- Allium montanum Guss., nom. illeg. = Allium tenuiflorum
- Allium montanum Rchb., nom. illeg. = Allium flavum subsp. flavum
- Allium montanum Sm., nom. illeg. = Allium sibthorpianum
- Allium montanum Ten., nom. illeg. = Allium cupani subsp. cupani
