= A. dilutipes =

A. dilutipes may refer to:

- Abacetus dilutipes, a ground beetle
- Altagonum dilutipes, a ground beetle
