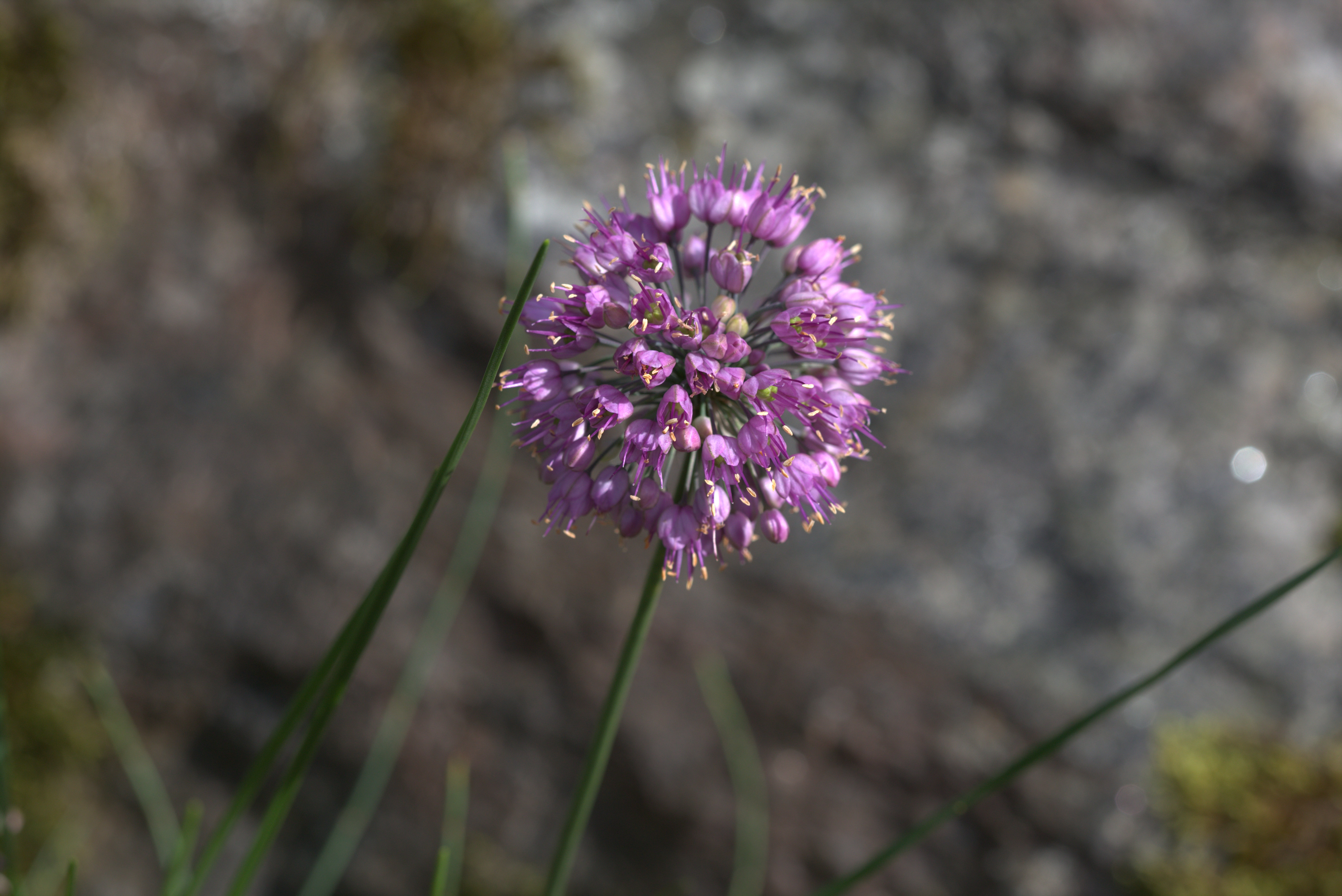

Scientific classification
- Kingdom: Plantae
- Clade: Embryophytes
- Clade: Tracheophytes
- Clade: Spermatophytes
- Clade: Angiosperms
- Clade: Monocots
- Order: Asparagales
- Family: Amaryllidaceae
- Subfamily: Allioideae
- Genus: Allium
- Species: A. sacculiferum

Binomial name
- Allium sacculiferum Maxim.

Synonyms
- Synonymy: Allium deltoidefistulosum S.O.Yu, S.Lee & W.T.Lee; Allium japonicum Regel 1875, illegitimate homonym not (Thunb.) Steud. 1840; Allium komarovianum Vved.; Allium ophiopogon H.Lév.; Allium sacculiferum var. viviparum Satake; Allium yuchuanii Y.Z.Zhao & J.Y.Chao

= Allium sacculiferum =

Species of plant

Allium sacculiferum, also called northern plain chive or triangular chive, is an East Asian species of wild onion native to Japan, Korea, eastern Russia (Amur Oblast, Khabarovsk, Primorye), and northeastern China (Inner Mongolia, Heilongjiang, Jilin, Liaoning). It is found along the banks of lakes and rivers at elevations less than 500 m.

Allium sacculiferum makes one or two egg-shaped bulbs up to 20 mm across. Scapes are up to 70 cm tall, round in cross-section. Leaves are flat, shorter than the scape, up to 5 mm across. Umbels are spherical, with many flowers crowded together. Tepals are lilac to reddish-violet with darker midveins.
