= Allium juldusicola =

尤尔都斯薤 you er du si xie

Scientific classification
- Kingdom: Plantae
- Clade: Tracheophytes
- Clade: Angiosperms
- Clade: Monocots
- Order: Asparagales
- Family: Amaryllidaceae
- Subfamily: Allioideae
- Genus: Allium
- Species: A. juldusicola

Binomial name
- Allium juldusicola Regel

Species of flowering plant

Allium juldusicola is a rare species of wild onion apparently endemic to western part of Xinjiang Province in China.

Allium juldusicola produces a single egg-shaped bulb about 15 mm in diameter. Scape is up to 30 cm tall. Leaves are flat, very narrow. Umbel is spherical, with a large number of white flowers.
