= Allium pseudoalbidum =

Conservation status
- Endangered (IUCN 3.1)

Scientific classification
- Kingdom: Plantae
- Clade: Tracheophytes
- Clade: Angiosperms
- Clade: Monocots
- Order: Asparagales
- Family: Amaryllidaceae
- Subfamily: Allioideae
- Genus: Allium
- Species: A. pseudoalbidum

Binomial name
- Allium pseudoalbidum N.Friesen & Özhatay

Species of flowering plant

Allium pseudoalbidum is a species of onion in the family Amaryllidaceae. It is endemic to Kars Province in Turkey. It can be found in montane steppe at about 1,900 m elevation. Because it is threatened by overgrazing, hay making and deforestation, it has been classified as an endangered species by the International Union for Conservation of Nature.

== Description ==
Allium pseudoalbidum is a small herbaceous perennial plant that grows in loose tufts, reaching 8–10 cm in height. The plant develops few conical-cylindrical bulbs that grow on short, branched rhizomes (underground stems). Its leaves are filiform (thread-like) and semi-cylindrical, measuring 0.5–1.5 mm in width. Unlike some related species, the leaves of A. pseudoalbidum do not turn reddish when dried. The leaves are about as long as the flowering stem.

The inflorescence (flower cluster) consists of a sparse umbel containing only 3–8 flowers. It is protected by a two-valved spathe (modified bract) that is acuminate (tapers to a point) and either equals or is shorter than the umbel. The flower stalks (pedicels) are of equal length, about 1.5–2 times longer than the perianth, and lack bracts.

The flowers feature white perianth segments (tepals) of about 4 mm in length, which are lanceolate (lance-shaped) and somewhat pointed, often with pink midveins. The stamens have filaments equal in length to the perianth segments. These filaments are fused at their bases both to each other and to the perianth. The inner filaments are triangular in shape and roughly twice as wide at the base as the outer ones. The style (female reproductive part) does not extend beyond the perianth.

Allium pseudoalbidum is closely related to A. albidum but can be distinguished by its thread-like leaves (which do not redden when dried) and its fewer-flowered umbels.

== Taxonomy ==
Allium pseudoalbidum was first described in 1998, following a taxonomic revision of Allium subgenus Rhizirideum in Turkey. The species epithet pseudoalbidum refers to its similarity to Allium albidum, particularly to A. albidum subsp. caucasicum, with which it had previously been confused. The specimen that became the holotype (ISTE 33484) had initially been misidentified as A. albidum subsp. caucasicum by Fania Kollmann in the Flora of Turkey (1984).

Within the genus Allium, A. pseudoalbidum is classified in the subgenus Rhizirideum, section Rhizirideum. The subgenus Rhizirideum is the smallest of the Allium subgenera in Turkey, representing only about five percent of the wild alliums in the region.

The type specimen was collected along a side path leading to a spring in the mountains near the town of Susuz Hasköy in Kars Province (A9), Turkey. The holotype is preserved in the herbarium of Istanbul University.
