= Allium subtilissimum =

蜜囊韭 mi nang jiu

Scientific classification
- Kingdom: Plantae
- Clade: Tracheophytes
- Clade: Angiosperms
- Clade: Monocots
- Order: Asparagales
- Family: Amaryllidaceae
- Subfamily: Allioideae
- Genus: Allium
- Species: A. subtilissimum

Binomial name
- Allium subtilissimum Ledeb.

Species of flowering plant

Allium subtilissimum is an Asian species of wild onion native to Kazakhstan, Mongolia, Altay Krai, Xinjiang and Inner Mongolia.

Allium subtilissimum creates a cluster of narrow bulbs each rarely more than 10 mm across. Scape is short for the genus, up to only 20 cm in height. Leaves are tubular, shorter than the scape, only about 500 μm wide. Umbels only a few flowers, these red or purple.
