= Allium rude =

野黄韭 ye huang jiu

Scientific classification
- Kingdom: Plantae
- Clade: Tracheophytes
- Clade: Angiosperms
- Clade: Monocots
- Order: Asparagales
- Family: Amaryllidaceae
- Subfamily: Allioideae
- Genus: Allium
- Subgenus: A. subg. Polyprason
- Species: A. rude

Binomial name
- Allium rude Xu, Jie Mei

Species of plant

Allium rude is a Chinese species of wild onion native to Gansu, Qinghai, Sichuan, and Tibet, at elevations of 2700–5000 m.

Allium rude produces one egg-shaped bulb up to 15 mm in diameter. Scape is up to 70 cm long, round in cross-section. Leaves are flat, long and narrow, usually shorter than the scape, up to 10 mm across. Umbels are spherical with large numbers of yellow flowers crowded together.
