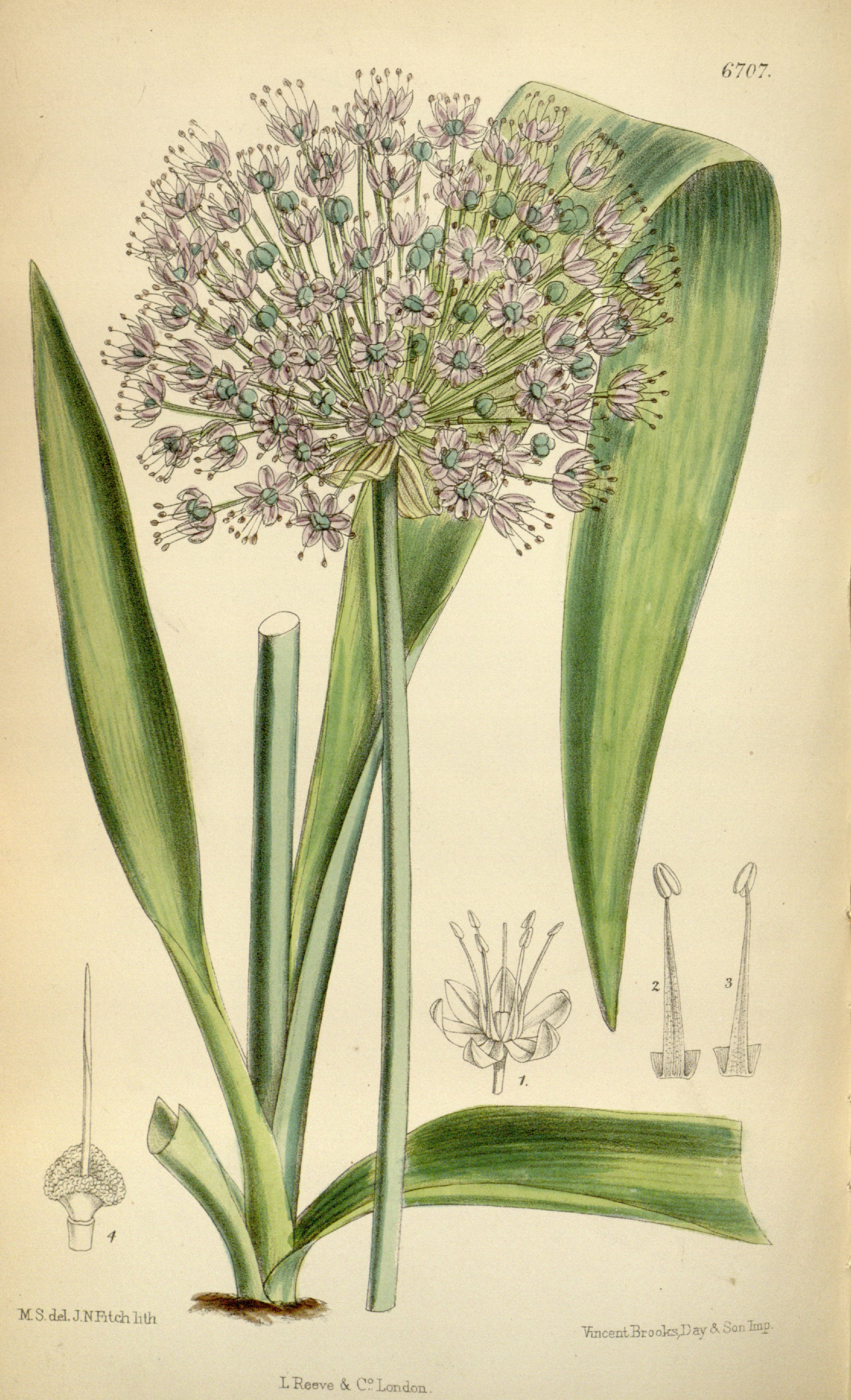
- Illustration of Allium macleanii

Scientific classification
- Kingdom: Plantae
- Clade: Tracheophytes
- Clade: Angiosperms
- Clade: Monocots
- Order: Asparagales
- Family: Amaryllidaceae
- Subfamily: Allioideae
- Genus: Allium
- Subgenus: Allium subg. Melanocrommyum
- Species: A. macleanii

Binomial name
- Allium macleanii Baker

Synonyms
- Allium elatum Regel; Allium isfairamicum B.Fedtsch. ex O.Fedtsch.; Allium lucens E.Nikitina

= Allium macleanii =

Species of wild onion

Allium macleanii is an Asian species of wild onion found at high elevations in Pakistan, Kazakhstan, Turkmenistan, Kyrgyzstan, Afghanistan, Nepal, Tajikistan, and northern India. It is a perennial herb up to 100 cm tall, with a spherical umbel up to 7 cm in diameter. The umbel is crowded with many purple flowers.
