= Allium antonii-bolosii =

Mallorca onion

Scientific classification
- Kingdom: Plantae
- Clade: Tracheophytes
- Clade: Angiosperms
- Clade: Monocots
- Order: Asparagales
- Family: Amaryllidaceae
- Subfamily: Allioideae
- Genus: Allium
- Species: A. antonii-bolosii

Binomial name
- Allium antonii-bolosii P.Palau

Synonyms
- Allium cupani var. antonii-bolosii (P.Palau) O.Bolòs & Vigo; Allium cupani var. minoricensis Llorens, not validly published

Species of flowering plant

Allium antonii-bolosii is a species of onion in the Amaryllis family, commonly called the Mallorca onion. It is native to the Balearic Islands in the western Mediterranean (Mallorca, Menorca, and Cabrera), part of Spain.

The plant is sometimes classified as a variety of Allium cupani.
