= Allium prattii =

太白山葱 tai bai shan cong

Scientific classification
- Kingdom: Plantae
- Clade: Tracheophytes
- Clade: Angiosperms
- Clade: Monocots
- Order: Asparagales
- Family: Amaryllidaceae
- Subfamily: Allioideae
- Genus: Allium
- Subgenus: A. subg. Anguinum
- Species: A. prattii

Binomial name
- Allium prattii C.H.Wright

SynonymsThe Plant List
- Synonymy: Allium cannifolium H.Lév.; Allium ellipticum Wall. ex Kunth; Allium prattii var. ellipticum F.T.Wang & Tang; Allium prattii var. vinicolor F.T.Wang & Tang; Allium victorialis var. angustifolium Hook.f.

Species of flowering plant

Allium prattii is an Asian species of wild onion native to Assam, Nepal, Sikkim, Bhutan, and China (Anhui, Gansu, Henan, Qinghai, Shaanxi, Sichuan, Tibet, Yunnan). It is found at elevations of 2000–4900 m.

Allium prattii has a scape up to 60 cm tall, round in cross-section. Leaves are flat, linear or very narrowly elliptic, usually a bit shorter than the scape. Umbel is hemispheric with many red or purple flowers.
