= Allium macrostylum =

Tien Shan onion Хан Тәңірі ЃБиԆЛҨ

Scientific classification
- Kingdom: Plantae
- Clade: Tracheophytes
- Clade: Angiosperms
- Clade: Monocots
- Order: Asparagales
- Family: Amaryllidaceae
- Subfamily: Allioideae
- Genus: Allium
- Species: A. macrostylum

Binomial name
- Allium macrostylum Regel

Species of flowering plant

Allium macrostylum is a Central Asian species of wild onion native to the Tien Shan Mountains in Kyrgyzstan. It is a bulb-forming perennial herb up to 30 cm tall. Leaves are flat, up to 15 mm wide. Umbel is spherical, with lilac-colored flowers.
