= Allium subangulatum =

紫花韭 zi hua jiu

Scientific classification
- Kingdom: Plantae
- Clade: Tracheophytes
- Clade: Angiosperms
- Clade: Monocots
- Order: Asparagales
- Family: Amaryllidaceae
- Subfamily: Allioideae
- Genus: Allium
- Subgenus: A. subg. Rhizirideum
- Species: A. subangulatum

Binomial name
- Allium subangulatum Regel

Species of plant

Allium subangulatum is a Chinese species of wild onion, native to Gansu, Ningxia and Qinghai Provinces.

Allium subangulatum produces a cluster of narrow bulbs, each up to 10 mm across. Scape is up to 35 cm tall. Leaves are long and very narrow, shorter than the scape and usually less than 1 mm wide. Umbel is hemispheric with many flowers crowded together. Tepals reddish-purple with darker red midvein.
