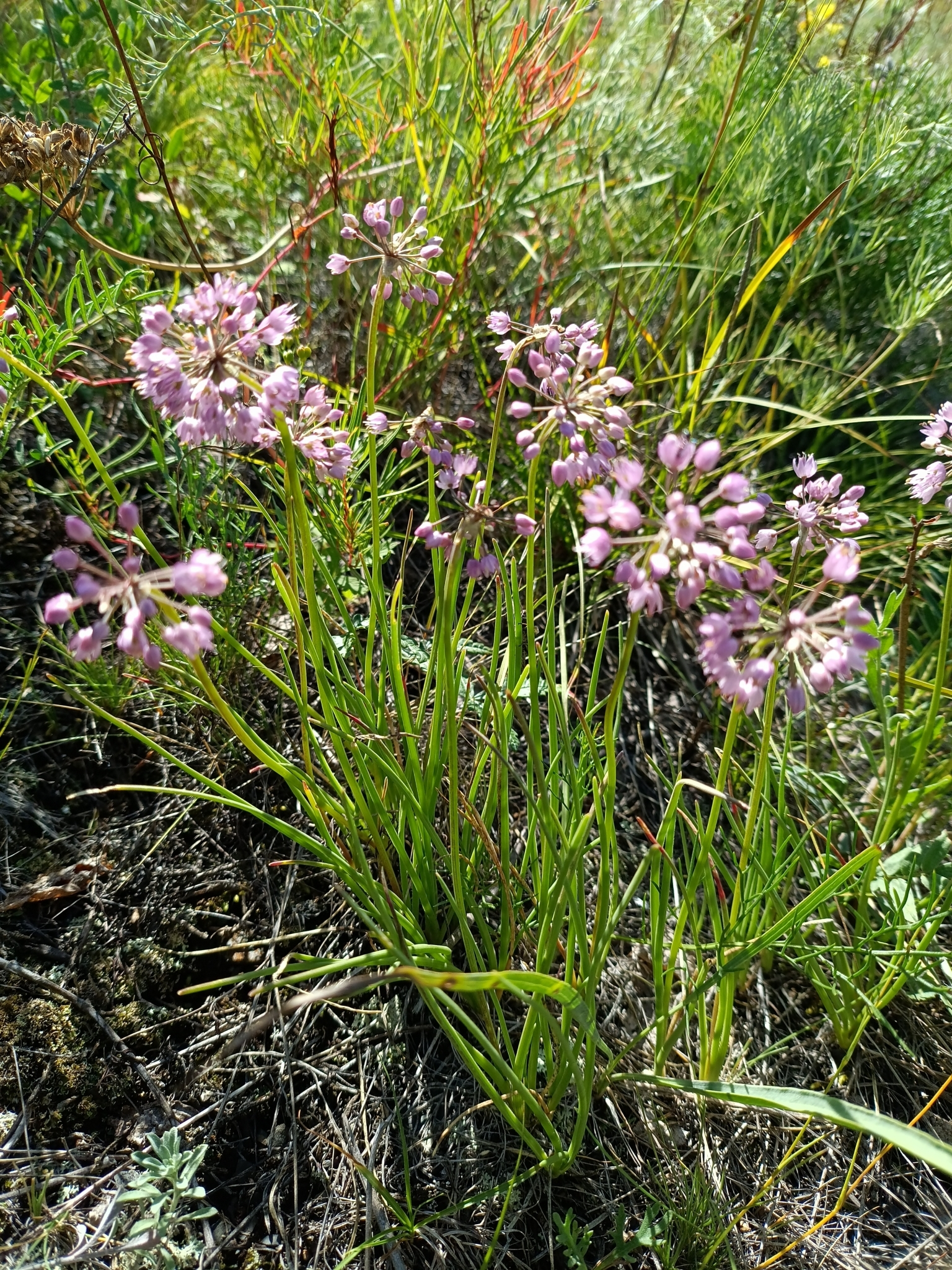

Scientific classification
- Kingdom: Plantae
- Clade: Tracheophytes
- Clade: Angiosperms
- Clade: Monocots
- Order: Asparagales
- Family: Amaryllidaceae
- Subfamily: Allioideae
- Genus: Allium
- Subgenus: A. subg. Rhizirideum
- Species: A. spurium

Binomial name
- Allium spurium G. Don 1827 not Schult. & Schult.f. 1830

Synonyms
- Allium dauricum N.Friesen; Allium saxicola Kitag.; Allium spirale Kunth 1843, illegitimate homonym not Willd. 1814

= Allium spurium =

Species of plant

Allium spurium is a species of wild onion native to eastern Russia (Amur Oblast, Buryatiya, Yakutia, Zabaykalsky Krai), Mongolia and China (Hebei, Heilongjiang, Jilin, Liaoning, Inner Mongolia).

Allium spurium produces 1 or 2 bulbs, each up to 15 mm in diameter. Plant spreads by means of underground rhizomes. Leaves are flat, narrowly linear, about 3 mm wide. Scapes are up to 40 cm tall. Umbel is hemispheric, with many pink or lilac flowers.
