= Allium rhynchogynum =

宽叶滇韭 kuan ye dian jiu

Scientific classification
- Kingdom: Plantae
- Clade: Tracheophytes
- Clade: Angiosperms
- Clade: Monocots
- Order: Asparagales
- Family: Amaryllidaceae
- Subfamily: Allioideae
- Genus: Allium
- Species: A. rhynchogynum

Binomial name
- Allium rhynchogynum Diels

Synonyms
- Allium rynchophysum H.Lév.

Species of flowering plant

Allium rhynchogynum is a Chinese species of wild onion endemic to the Yunnan region in southern China. It grows at elevations of 2700–3200 m.

Allium rhynchogynum has scapes up to 25 cm long. Leaves are flat, sword-shaped, shorter than the scape, up to 10 mm wide. Umbels have only a few pink flowers.

== Description ==
The genus Allium, known for its herbaceous geophyte perennials, is characterized by true bulbs, often with an onion or garlic scent and flavour. These bulbs can be solitary or clustered, tunicate, and produce annually from the base or ends of rhizomes. Some species have tuberous roots. Leaves vary from one to 12, with linear or broad blades, either straight or coiled. Flowers, on scapes, exhibit six petal-like tepals in two whorls, one style, and six epipetalous stamens. Capsule fruits open longitudinally, containing black, rounded seeds. The inflorescences are umbels, subtended by fused spathe bracts. Some species form bulbils, and many are used as food, although some poisonous species exist.
