= Allium phariense =

帕里韭 pa li jiu

Scientific classification
- Kingdom: Plantae
- Clade: Tracheophytes
- Clade: Angiosperms
- Clade: Monocots
- Order: Asparagales
- Family: Amaryllidaceae
- Subfamily: Allioideae
- Genus: Allium
- Species: A. phariense

Binomial name
- Allium phariense Rendle

Species of flowering plant

Allium phariense is an Asian species of wild onion native to mountainous areas of Bhutan, Sichuan, and Tibet. It grows at elevations of 4400–5200 m.

Allium phariense has 1-3 egg-shaped bulbs up to 10 15 mm in diameter. Scape is up to 15 cm long, usually nodding toward the tip. Leaves are about the same length as the scape. Umbel is a spherical cluster of many white flowers crowded together.
