= Allium roborowskianum =

新疆蒜 xin jiang suan

Scientific classification
- Kingdom: Plantae
- Clade: Tracheophytes
- Clade: Angiosperms
- Clade: Monocots
- Order: Asparagales
- Family: Amaryllidaceae
- Subfamily: Allioideae
- Genus: Allium
- Subgenus: Allium subg. Melanocrommyum
- Species: A. roborowskianum

Binomial name
- Allium roborowskianum Regel

Species of plant

Allium roborowskianum is an Asian species of wild onion native to Xinjiang and Mongolia. It grows at elevations of 1,000–1,300 m.

Allium roborowskianum produces one round bulb up to 25 cm in diameter. Scape is up to 50 cm tall, round in cross-section. Leaves are flat. linear, shorter than the scape, up to 15 mm across. Umbels are hemispherical, crowded with many white or lilac flowers.

Some authors consider Allium sinkiangense F.T.Wang & Y.C.Tang to be synonymous with A. roborowskianum, but the World Checklist accepts them as distinct species.
