= Allium tanguticum =

唐古薤 tang gu xie

Scientific classification
- Kingdom: Plantae
- Clade: Tracheophytes
- Clade: Angiosperms
- Clade: Monocots
- Order: Asparagales
- Family: Amaryllidaceae
- Subfamily: Allioideae
- Genus: Allium
- Subgenus: A. subg. Allium
- Species: A. tanguticum

Binomial name
- Allium tanguticum Regel

Species of flowering plant

Allium tanguticum is a Chinese species of wild onion native to Gansu, Qinghai and Tibet. It grows at elevations of about 2000–3500 m.

Allium tanguticum produces one round to egg-shaped bulb up to 15 mm across. Scape is up to 50 cm tall, round in cross-section. Leaves are flat, shorter than the scape, up to 4 mm wide. Umbel is hemispheric, with many purple flowers crowded together.
