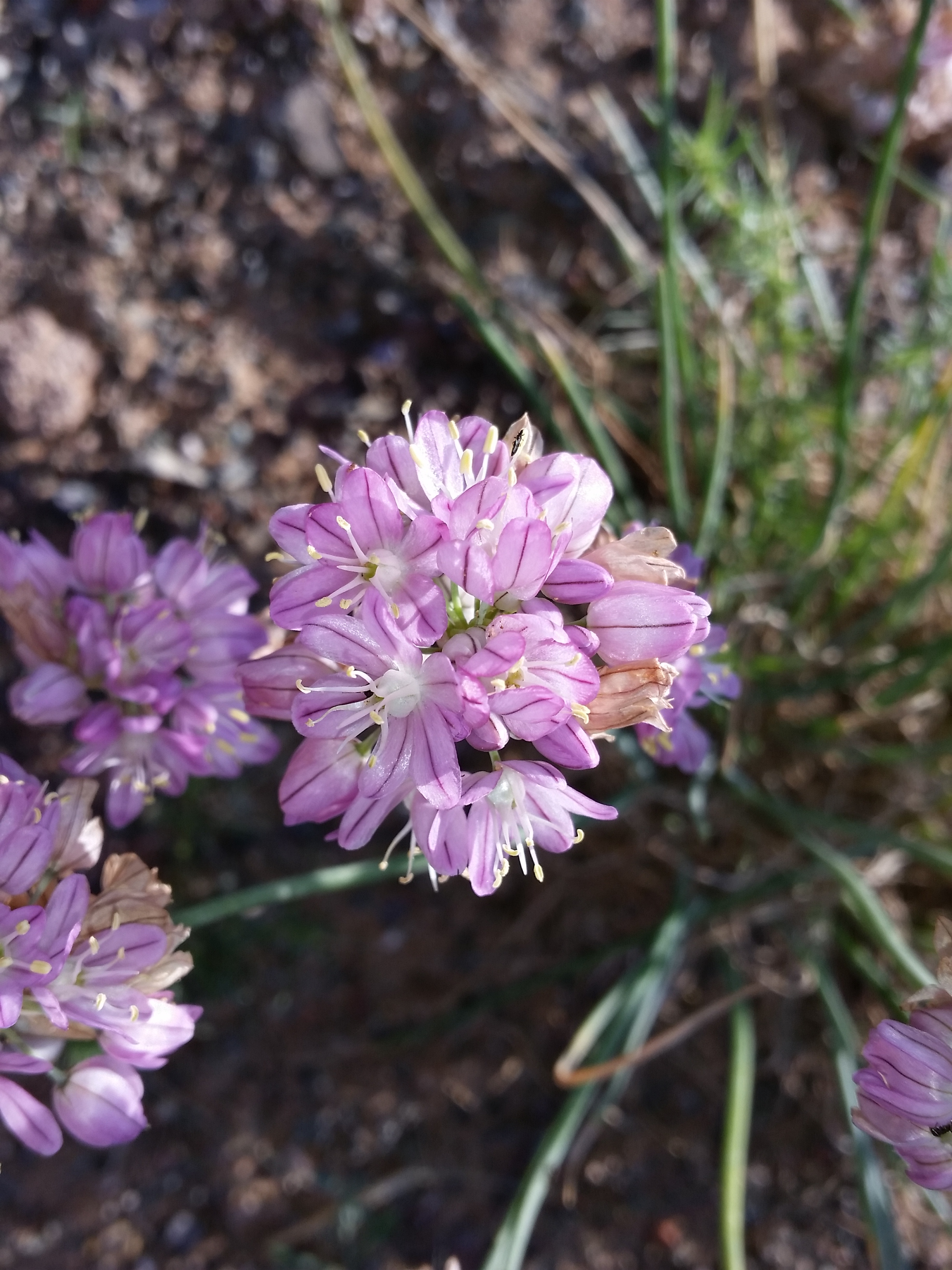

Scientific classification
- Kingdom: Plantae
- Clade: Tracheophytes
- Clade: Angiosperms
- Clade: Monocots
- Order: Asparagales
- Family: Amaryllidaceae
- Subfamily: Allioideae
- Genus: Allium
- Subgenus: A. subg. Rhizirideum
- Species: A. mongolicum

Binomial name
- Allium mongolicum Turcz. ex Regel

Synonyms
- Allium krylovii Sobolevsk.; Allium mongolicum var. kabaense Chang Y. Yang & J.H.Huang

= Allium mongolicum =

Asian wild onion

Allium mongolicum is an Asian species of wild onion native to Mongolia, Inner Mongolia, Tuva, Kazakhstan, and parts of China (Gansu, Liaoning, Ningxia, Qinghai, Shaanxi, Xinjiang).

Allium mongolicum produces clumps of thin bulbs. Scapes are up to 30 cm tall, sometimes more than one on the same plant. Leaves are hollow, tubular, shorter than the scape. Umbels are densely crowded with many red or purple-red flowers.
