= Altagonum noctellum =

Scientific classification
- Kingdom: Animalia
- Phylum: Arthropoda
- Clade: Pancrustacea
- Class: Insecta
- Order: Coleoptera
- Suborder: Adephaga
- Family: Carabidae
- Genus: Altagonum
- Species: A. noctellum

Binomial name
- Altagonum noctellum Darlington, 1952

Species of beetle

Altagonum noctellum is a species of ground beetle in the subfamily Carabinae. It was described by Darlington in 1952. They are deep brown, close to black in color, with only faintly iridescent elytra. Length typically between 6.8-7.9 mm; width typically 2.5-2.9 mm. Altagonum noctellum closely resembles Altagonum nox and other species in the genus Altagonum.
