= Allium schrenkii =

单丝辉韭 dan si hui jiu

Scientific classification
- Kingdom: Plantae
- Clade: Tracheophytes
- Clade: Angiosperms
- Clade: Monocots
- Order: Asparagales
- Family: Amaryllidaceae
- Subfamily: Allioideae
- Genus: Allium
- Species: A. schrenkii

Binomial name
- Allium schrenkii Regel

Synonyms
- Allium bogdoicola Regel

Species of flowering plant

Allium schrenkii is an Asian species of wild onion native to Xinjiang, Kazakhstan, Mongolia and Siberia (Tuva, Altay Krai). It grows on steep slopes at elevations of 2400–2800 m.

Allium schrenkii produces a single bulb rarely more than 10 mm across. Scape is up to 40 cm tall. Leaves are short, narrowly linear, shorter than the scape. Umbels are spherical with many purple flowers.
