= Allium megalobulbon =

大鳞韭 da lin jiu

Scientific classification
- Kingdom: Plantae
- Clade: Tracheophytes
- Clade: Angiosperms
- Clade: Monocots
- Order: Asparagales
- Family: Amaryllidaceae
- Subfamily: Allioideae
- Genus: Allium
- Species: A. megalobulbon

Binomial name
- Allium megalobulbon Regel

Species of flowering plant

Allium megalobulbon is a rare species of wild onion found only in the western part of Xinjiang Province in western China.

Allium megalobulbon has long, narrow bulbs up to 10 cm long and 10–15 mm wide. Scapes are up to 40 cm long. Leaves are flat. Umbels are densely packed with many pink flowers.
