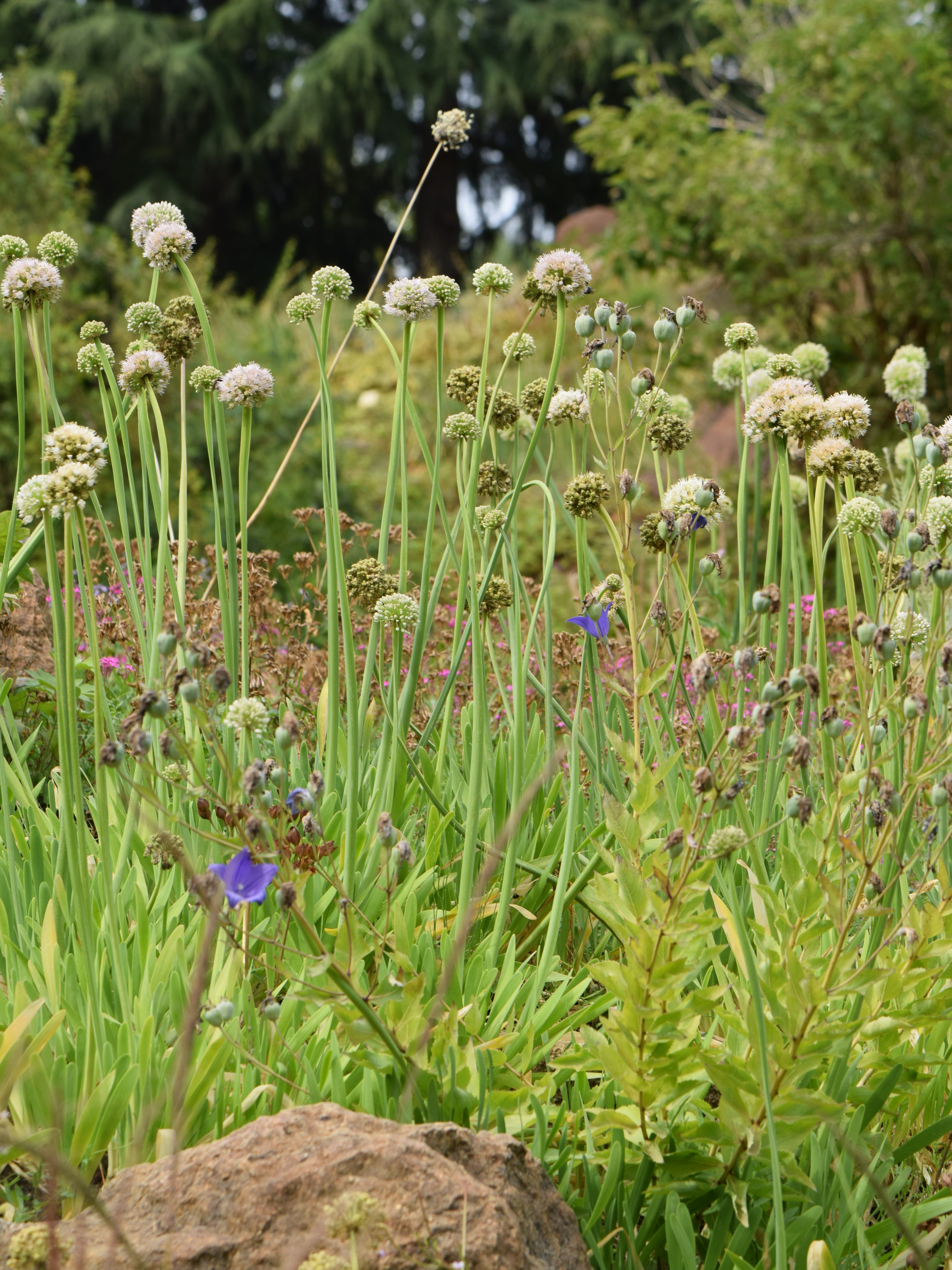

Scientific classification
- Kingdom: Plantae
- Clade: Tracheophytes
- Clade: Angiosperms
- Clade: Monocots
- Order: Asparagales
- Family: Amaryllidaceae
- Subfamily: Allioideae
- Genus: Allium
- Subgenus: A. subg. Cepa
- Species: A. semenovii

Binomial name
- Allium semenovii Regel

Synonyms
- Synonymy: Allium semenowii Regel, alternate spelling; Allium semenori Regel, alternate spelling; Allium semenovii var. versicolor Regel; Allium tristylum Regel; Allium tristylum var. rubescens Regel; Allium tristylum var. versicolor Regel

= Allium semenovii =

Species of flowering plant

Allium semenovii is an Asian species of wild onion native to Xinjiang, Kazakhstan, Tajikistan, and Kyrgyzstan. It grows at elevations of 2000–3000 m.

Allium semenovii has bulbs up to 15 mm in diameter. Its scapes are up to 50 cm tall. The leaves are flat, up to 15 mm wide. The umbels are spherical and densely crowded with many yellow flowers.
