= Allium tenuicaule =

Scientific classification
- Kingdom: Plantae
- Clade: Tracheophytes
- Clade: Angiosperms
- Clade: Monocots
- Order: Asparagales
- Family: Amaryllidaceae
- Subfamily: Allioideae
- Genus: Allium
- Species: A. tenuicaule

Binomial name
- Allium tenuicaule Regel

Species of plant

Allium tenuicaule is an Asian species of wild onion found in Pakistan, Afghanistan, Iran, Uzbekistan and Tajikistan. It has a cluster of narrow bulbs, and a scape up to 20 cm tall. Leaves are very narrow and hair-like. Flowers are dark purple.
