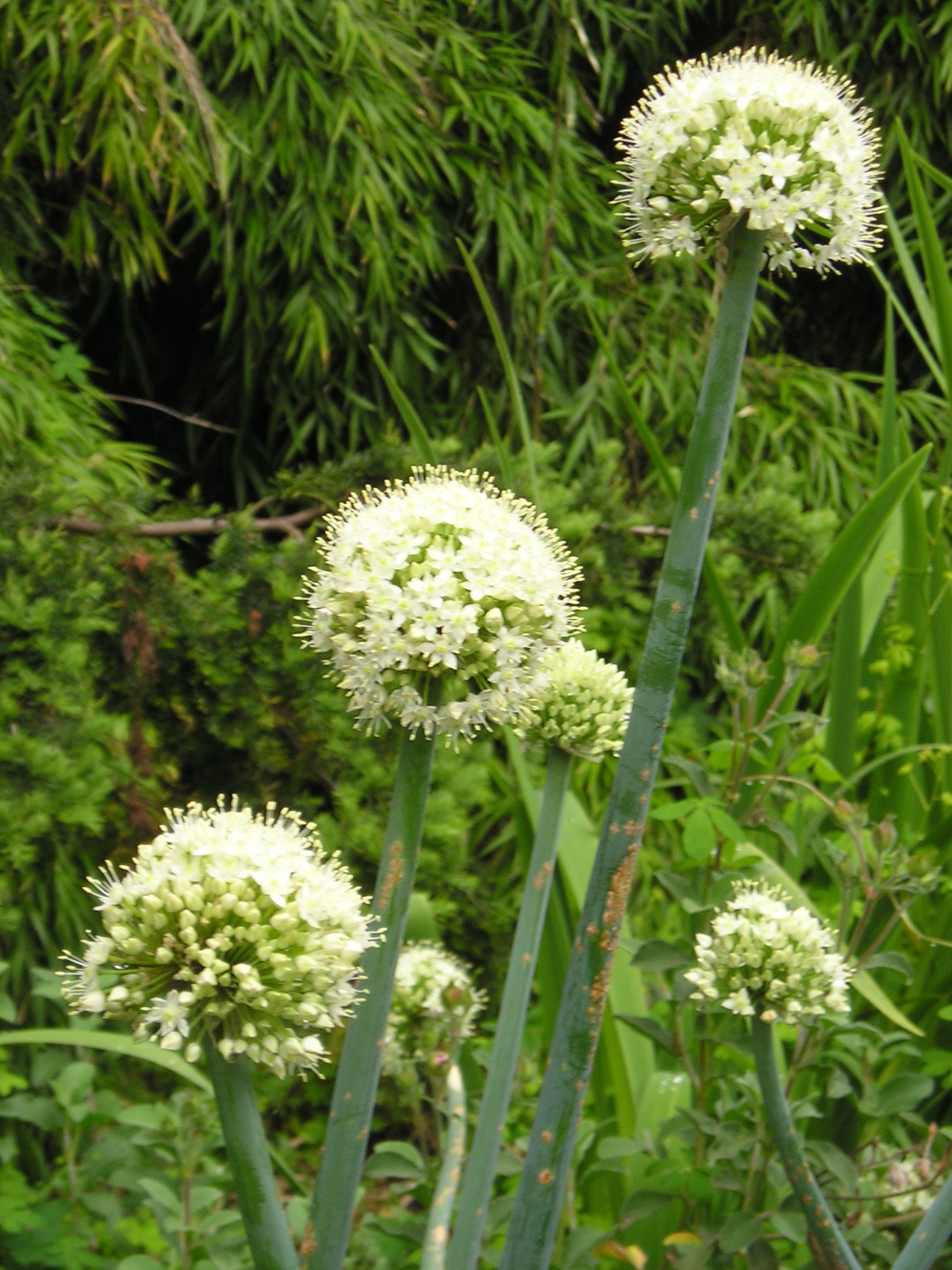
- In flower
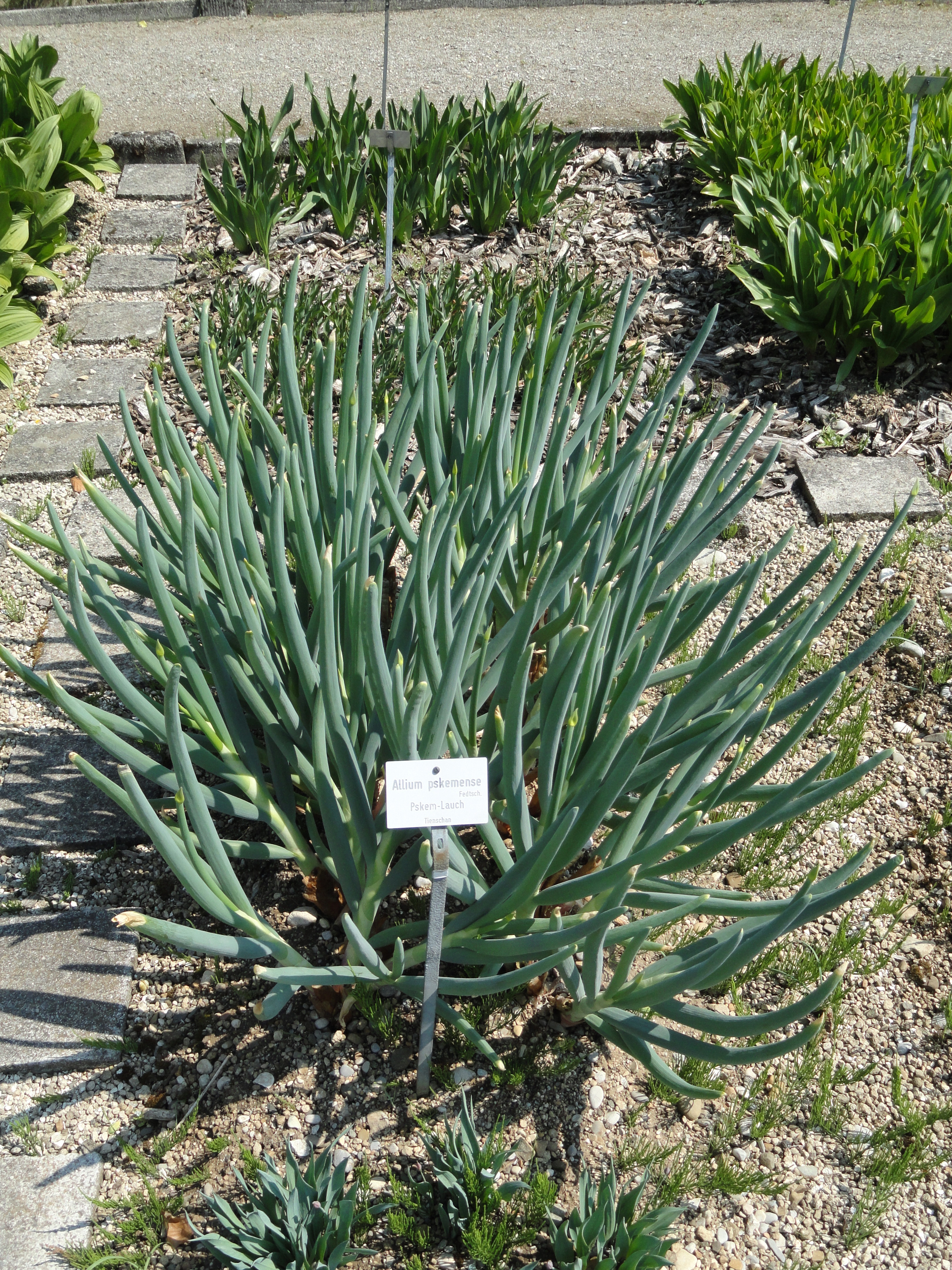
- Allium pskemense Botanischer Garten München-Nymphenburg

Conservation status
- Data Deficient (IUCN 3.1)

Scientific classification
- Kingdom: Plantae
- Clade: Tracheophytes
- Clade: Angiosperms
- Clade: Monocots
- Order: Asparagales
- Family: Amaryllidaceae
- Subfamily: Allioideae
- Genus: Allium
- Subgenus: A. subg. Cepa
- Species: A. pskemense

Binomial name
- Allium pskemense B.Fedtsch

= Allium pskemense =

Species of flowering plant

Allium pskemense is a rare Asian species of wild onion native to Uzbekistan, Kyrgyzstan, and southern Kazakhstan.

Allium pskemense has been overharvested for its traditional uses in food and medicine, though there are some reports of it being cultivated in kitchen gardens.
