= Allium savii =

Scientific classification
- Kingdom: Plantae
- Clade: Tracheophytes
- Clade: Angiosperms
- Clade: Monocots
- Order: Asparagales
- Family: Amaryllidaceae
- Subfamily: Allioideae
- Genus: Allium
- Subgenus: A. subg. Allium
- Species: A. savii

Binomial name
- Allium savii Parl.

Synonyms
- Allium fuscum var. savii (Parl.) Nyman; Allium pallens var. savii (Parl.) Ces.; Allium paniculatum var. salinum Debeaux in C.Magnier; Allium paniculatum subsp. salinum (Debeaux) F.Botte & Kerguélen

Species of flowering plant

Allium savii is a species of wild onion native to southwestern Europe: Balearic Islands, France incl Corsica, Italy (Emilia-Romagna, Toscana, Lazio, Sardinia).
