= Altagonum stellaris =

Scientific classification
- Domain: Eukaryota
- Kingdom: Animalia
- Phylum: Arthropoda
- Class: Insecta
- Order: Coleoptera
- Suborder: Adephaga
- Family: Carabidae
- Genus: Altagonum
- Species: A. stellaris

Binomial name
- Altagonum stellaris Darlington, 1971

Species of beetle

Altagonum stellaris is a species of ground beetle in the subfamily Carabinae. It was described by Darlington in 1971.
