= Altagonum tenuellum =

Scientific classification
- Domain: Eukaryota
- Kingdom: Animalia
- Phylum: Arthropoda
- Class: Insecta
- Order: Coleoptera
- Suborder: Adephaga
- Family: Carabidae
- Subfamily: Carabinae
- Genus: Altagonum
- Species: A. tenuellum

Binomial name
- Altagonum tenuellum Darlington, 1971

Synonyms
- Altagonum tenellum

Species of beetle

Altagonum tenuellum is a species in the beetle family Carabidae. It is found in New Guinea.
