= Altagonum paulum =

Scientific classification
- Domain: Eukaryota
- Kingdom: Animalia
- Phylum: Arthropoda
- Class: Insecta
- Order: Coleoptera
- Suborder: Adephaga
- Family: Carabidae
- Genus: Altagonum
- Species: A. paulum

Binomial name
- Altagonum paulum Darlington, 1970

Species of beetle

Altagonum paulum is a species of ground beetle in the subfamily Carabinae. It was described by Darlington in 1970. The species is found in Micronesia and New Guinea.
