= Altagonum wegneri =

Scientific classification
- Domain: Eukaryota
- Kingdom: Animalia
- Phylum: Arthropoda
- Class: Insecta
- Order: Coleoptera
- Suborder: Adephaga
- Family: Carabidae
- Genus: Altagonum
- Species: A. wegneri

Binomial name
- Altagonum wegneri Louwerens, 1956

Species of beetle

Altagonum wegneri is a species of ground beetle in the subfamily Carabinae. It was described by Louwerens in 1956.
