= Altagonum papuense =

Scientific classification
- Kingdom: Animalia
- Phylum: Arthropoda
- Class: Insecta
- Order: Coleoptera
- Suborder: Adephaga
- Family: Carabidae
- Genus: Altagonum
- Species: A. papuense

Binomial name
- Altagonum papuense (Sloane, 1890)

Synonyms
- Platynus papuense Sloane, 1890; Colpodes papuense Sloane, 1907; Altagonum papuense Darlington, 1952

Species of beetle

Altagonum papuense is a species of ground beetle in the subfamily Carabinae. It was described by Sloane in 1890.
