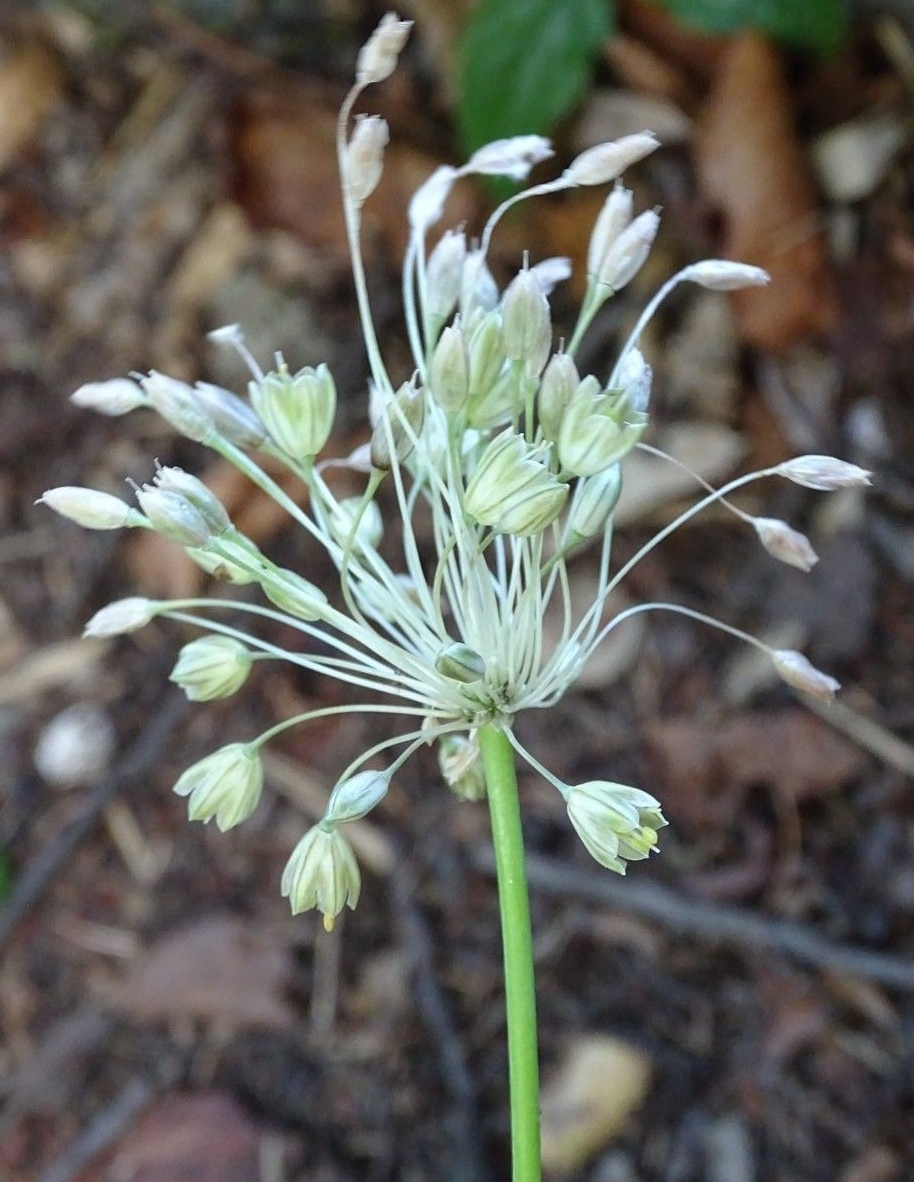

Scientific classification
- Kingdom: Plantae
- Clade: Tracheophytes
- Clade: Angiosperms
- Clade: Monocots
- Order: Asparagales
- Family: Amaryllidaceae
- Subfamily: Allioideae
- Genus: Allium
- Species: A. oporinanthum

Binomial name
- Allium oporinanthum Brullo, Pavone & Salmeri

Synonyms
- Allium oleraceum subsp. girerdii J.-M.Tison

= Allium oporinanthum =

Species of flowering plant

Allium oporinanthum is a European species of wild onion native to Spain and France.
