= Altagonum =

Scientific classification
- Domain: Eukaryota
- Kingdom: Animalia
- Phylum: Arthropoda
- Class: Insecta
- Order: Coleoptera
- Suborder: Adephaga
- Superfamily: Caraboidea
- Family: Carabidae
- Subfamily: Carabinae
- Genus: Altagonum; Darlington, 1952

Genus of beetles

Altagonum is a genus of beetles in the family Carabidae, containing the following species:

- Altagonum avium Darlington, 1971
- Altagonum caducum Darlington, 1952
- Altagonum celebense Baehr, 2008
- Altagonum cheesmani Darlington, 1952
- Altagonum cracens Darlington, 1971
- Altagonum dilutipes Darlington, 1952
- Altagonum erugatum Darlington, 1971
- Altagonum europhilum Darlington, 1952
- Altagonum exutum Darlington, 1971
- Altagonum fatuum Darlington, 1952
- Altagonum flavicorne Louwerens, 1969
- Altagonum grossuloides Darlington, 1952
- Altagonum grossulum Darlington, 1952
- Altagonum japenox Darlington, 1952
- Altagonum kurandae Baehr, 2016
- Altagonum latilimbus Darlington, 1952
- Altagonum magnox Darlington, 1952
- Altagonum misim Darlington, 1952
- Altagonum montanum Louwerens, 1956
- Altagonum noctellum Darlington, 1952
- Altagonum nox Darlington, 1952
- Altagonum nudicolle Darlington, 1952
- Altagonum pallinox Darlington, 1952
- Altagonum papuense (Sloane, 1890)
- Altagonum paralimbus Darlington, 1952
- Altagonum parascapha Darlington, 1971
- Altagonum paulum Darlington, 1970
- Altagonum planinox Darlington, 1952
- Altagonum postsulcatum Darlington, 1952
- Altagonum pubinox Darlington, 1952
- Altagonum regiscapha Darlington, 1952
- Altagonum scapha Darlington, 1952
- Altagonum sedlaceki Louwerens, 1969
- Altagonum sororium Darlington, 1971
- Altagonum sphodrum Darlington, 1952
- Altagonum stellaris Darlington, 1971
- Altagonum tenuellum Darlington, 1971
- Altagonum tutum Darlington, 1952
- Altagonum ullrichi Baehr, 2017
- Altagonum vallicola Darlington, 1952
- Altagonum wegneri Louwerens, 1956
