= Allium litardierei =

Scientific classification
- Kingdom: Plantae
- Clade: Tracheophytes
- Clade: Angiosperms
- Clade: Monocots
- Order: Asparagales
- Family: Amaryllidaceae
- Subfamily: Allioideae
- Genus: Allium
- Species: A. litardierei

Binomial name
- Allium litardierei J.-M.Tison

Synonyms
- Synonymy: Allium paniculatum subsp. breviscapum Litard. & Maire 1924 not Allium breviscapum Stapf 1885; Allium paniculatum var. breviscapum (Litard. & Maire) Maire; Allium paniculatum subsp. mauritii Maire & Sennen; Allium paniculatum var. grandiflorum Maire & Weiller; Allium paniculatum var. brachyspathum Faure & Maire; Allium paniculatum var. stenanthum Maire; Allium paniculatum var. mauritii (Maire & Sennen) Maire; Allium paniculatum var. grandiflorum (Maire & Weiller) Pastor & Valdés

Species of flowering plant

Allium litardierei is a North African species of wild onion native to Algeria and Morocco.

The oldest name applied to the taxon is the 1924 moniker Allium paniculatum subsp. breviscapum Litard. & Maire. Elevating the epithet breviscapum to species level is prevented by the existence of the 1885 name Allium breviscapum Stapf, hence the need for a new name, Allium litardierei J.-M.Tison in 2010.
