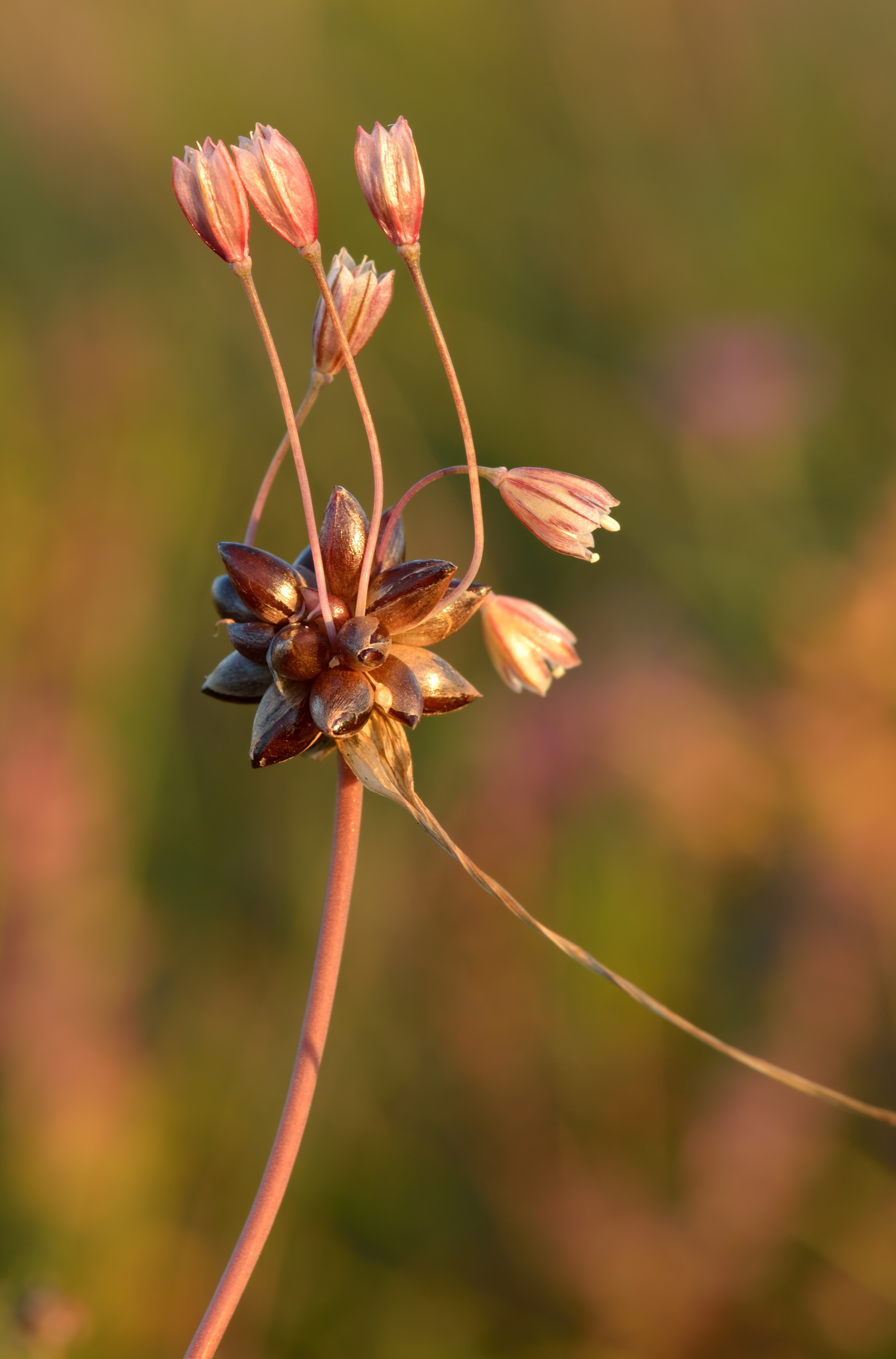

Scientific classification
- Kingdom: Plantae
- Clade: Tracheophytes
- Clade: Angiosperms
- Clade: Monocots
- Order: Asparagales
- Family: Amaryllidaceae
- Subfamily: Allioideae
- Genus: Allium
- Subgenus: A. subg. Allium
- Species: A. oleraceum

Binomial name
- Allium oleraceum L. 1753 not Des Moul. 1840

Synonyms
- Synonymy: Allium complanatum Boreau; Allium intermedium G.Don; Allium oleraceum var. carinatum Nyman; Allium oleraceum var. latifolium W.D.J.Koch; Allium oxypetalum G.Don; Allium pallens var. pseudooleraceum Seregin; Allium parviflorum Thuill.; Allium scabrum Gilib.; Allium virens Lam.; Allium virescens Lam.; Cepa oleracea (L.) Bernh.; Codonoprasum alpicola Jord. & Fourr.; Codonoprasum complanatum (Boreau) Fourr.; Codonoprasum intermedium Rchb.; Codonoprasum oleraceum (L.) Rchb.; Codonoprasum viridiflorum Schur; Porrum oleraceum (L.) Moench; Raphione oleracea (L.) Salisb.

= Allium oleraceum =

Field garlic

Species of flowering plant

Allium oleraceum, the field garlic, is a Eurasian species of wild onion. It is a bulbous perennial that grows wild in dry places, reaching 30 centimetres (12 in) in height. It reproduces by seed, bulbs and by the production of small bulblets in the flower head (similarly to Allium vineale). Unlike A. vineale, it is very rare with A. oleraceum to find flower-heads containing bulbils only. In addition, the spathe in A. oleraceum is in two parts.

Its specific epithet oleraceum means "vegetable/herbal" in Latin and is a form of holeraceus (oleraceus).

== Description ==
Allium oleraceum grows to a height of about 12 in (30 cm). The underground bulb is up to 0.8 in (2 cm) in diameter. The main stem is usually rounded, but is occasionally flattened, and bears two to four leaves and a terminal inflorescence composed of a number of small, stalked, pinkish-brown flowers and sometimes a few bulblets. The papery bracts have long points which often much overtop the flowers, the stamens of which do not protrude.

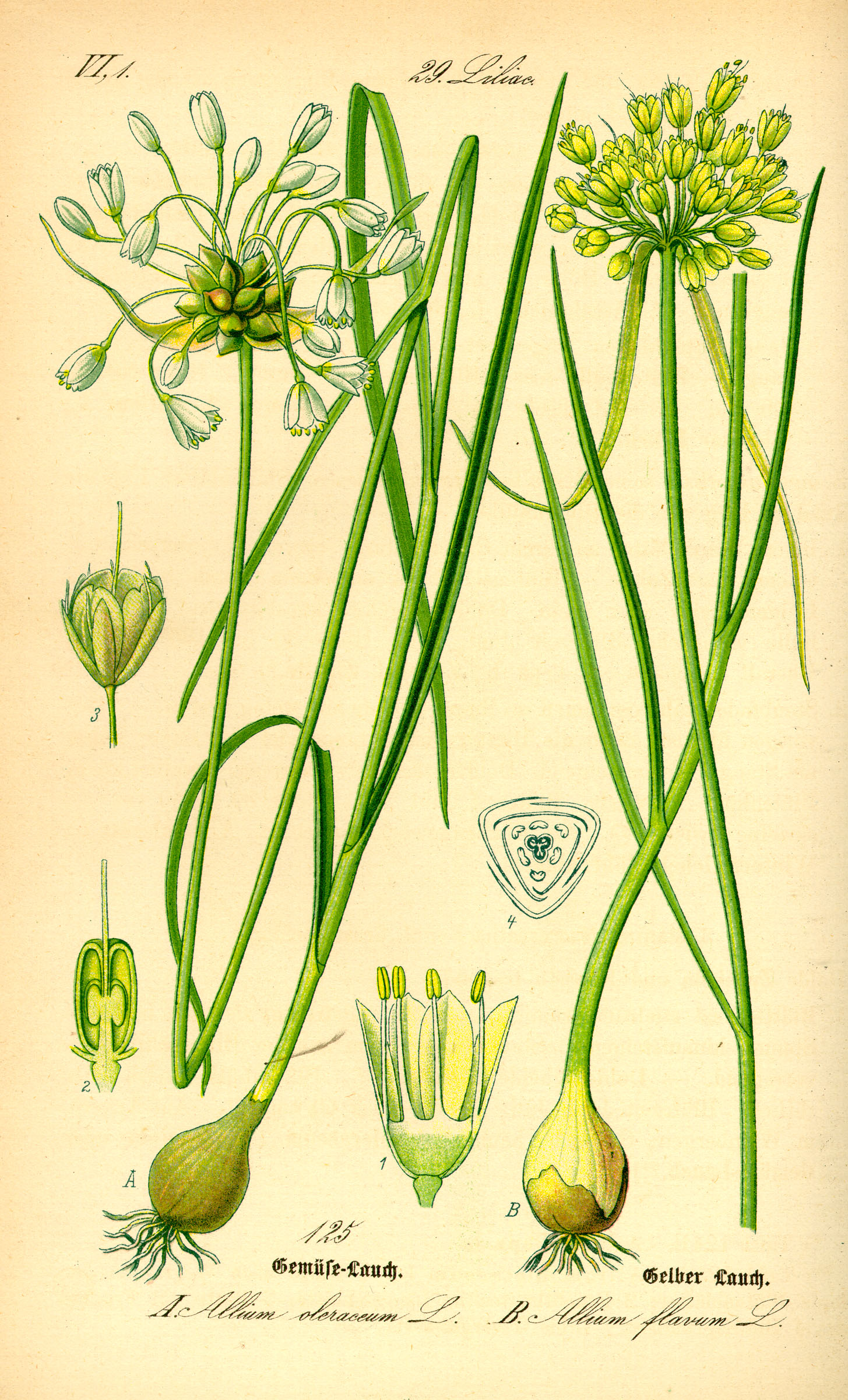
1885 Illustration

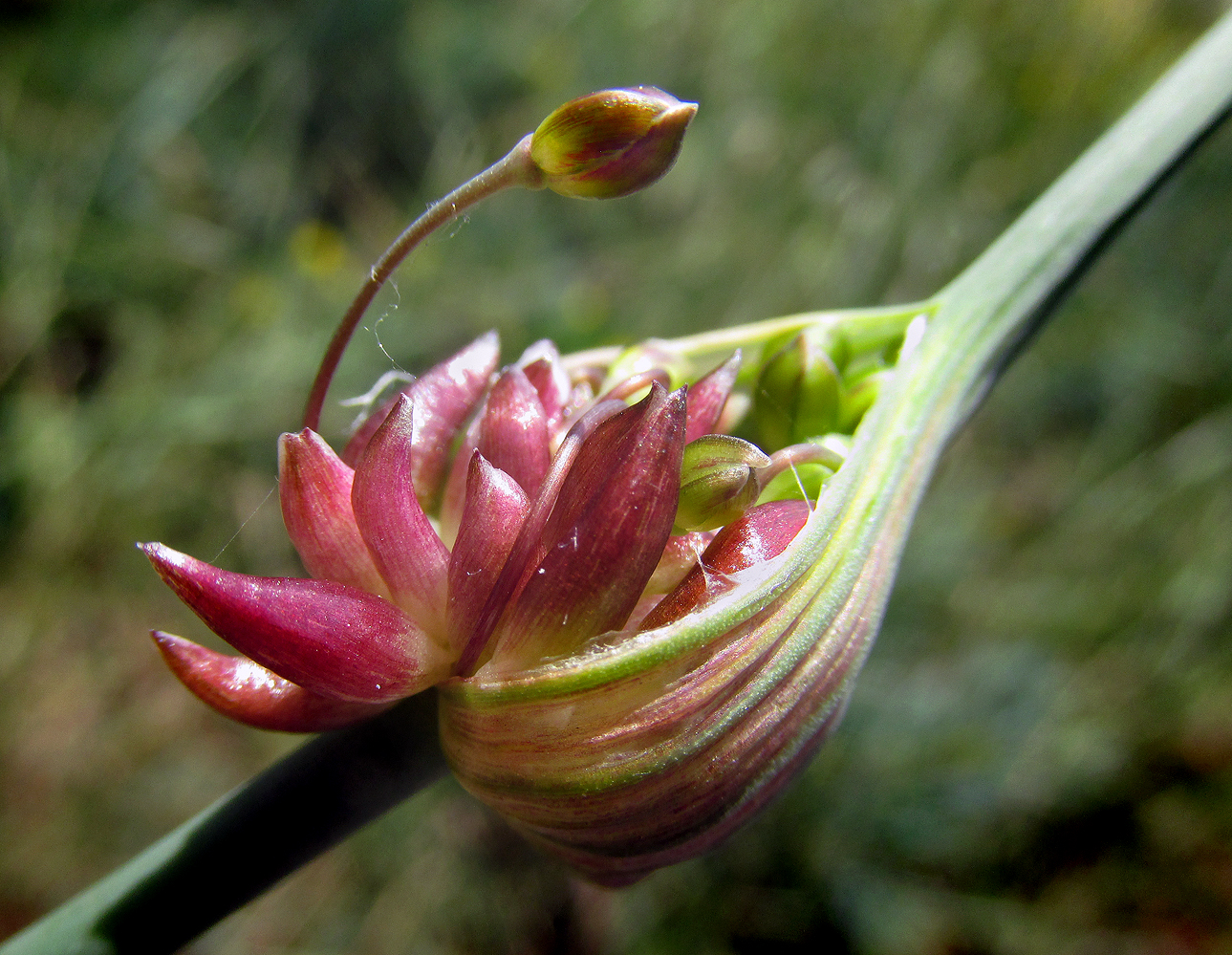

== Distribution ==
Allium oleraceum is widespread across most of Europe, with additional populations in Turkey and the Caucasus. It is sparingly naturalised in scattered locations in North America.

In the United Kingdom, A. oleraceum is found in dry, grassy places, usually steeply sloping and calcareous soils, and on open sunny banks in river floodplains. A. oleraceum is scattered throughout England and very scattered in Wales, Scotland and Ireland. Erosion of coastal areas leads to a reduction in the available habitat for this species, leading to population declines. The highest altitude from which it has been recorded in Britain is 365 m (1,200 ft) in Dovedale, Derbyshire.

Allium oleraceum subsp. girerdii was formerly included, but is now classified as Allium oporinanthum.

== See also ==
- Allium vineale
- Allium monanthum
