= Allium longispathum =

Scientific classification
- Kingdom: Plantae
- Clade: Tracheophytes
- Clade: Angiosperms
- Clade: Monocots
- Order: Asparagales
- Family: Amaryllidaceae
- Subfamily: Allioideae
- Genus: Allium
- Subgenus: A. subg. Allium
- Species: A. longispathum

Binomial name
- Allium longispathum Redouté

Synonyms
- List: Allium amansii Boreau; Allium boryanum Kunth; Allium collinum Guss.; Allium dentiferum Webb & Berthel.; Allium intermedium DC.; Allium monspessulanum Willd.; Allium oleraceum Des Moul.; Allium paniculatum Vill.; Allium paniculatum subsp. intermedium (DC.) Asch. & Graebn.; Allium paniculatum subsp. longispathum (Redouté) K.Richt.; Allium parnassicum subsp. minoicum Zahar.; Allium pugetii Gand.; Allium tenuiflorum subsp. apenninum A.Huet ex Nyman; Allium vineale subsp. monspessulanum Nyman; Codonoprasum longispathum (Redouté) Rchb.

Species of plant in the amaryllis family

Allium longispathum, or the Mediterranean onion, is a species of flowering plant in the family Amaryllidaceae, native to Macaronesia and the Mediterranean basin. Some authorities consider it a subspecies of pale garlic, Allium paniculatum.
