= Altagonum postsulcatum =

Scientific classification
- Domain: Eukaryota
- Kingdom: Animalia
- Phylum: Arthropoda
- Class: Insecta
- Order: Coleoptera
- Suborder: Adephaga
- Family: Carabidae
- Genus: Altagonum
- Species: A. postsulcatum

Binomial name
- Altagonum postsulcatum Darlington, 1952

Species of beetle

Altagonum postsulcatum is a species of ground beetle in the subfamily Carabinae. It was described by Darlington in 1952.
