= Allium galileum =

Galilee onion

Scientific classification
- Kingdom: Plantae
- Clade: Tracheophytes
- Clade: Angiosperms
- Clade: Monocots
- Order: Asparagales
- Family: Amaryllidaceae
- Subfamily: Allioideae
- Genus: Allium
- Species: A. galileum

Binomial name
- Allium galileum Brullo, Guglielmo, Pavone & Salmeri

Species of flowering plant

Allium galileum is a species of onion known only from Palestine and Israel.

Allium galileum has egg-shaped bulbs up to 22 mm long. Scape is rigid, up to 50 cm tall. Leaves are tubular, up to 25 cm long. Umbel is lax, with many flowers. Tepals are yellow-green or purple-green.
