= Allium lehmannii =

Sicilian Garlic Aglio di Coppoler

Scientific classification
- Kingdom: Plantae
- Clade: Tracheophytes
- Clade: Angiosperms
- Clade: Monocots
- Order: Asparagales
- Family: Amaryllidaceae
- Subfamily: Allioideae
- Genus: Allium
- Species: A. lehmannii

Binomial name
- Allium lehmannii Lojac.

Synonyms
- Allium aethusanum Garbari; Allium pallens subsp. siciliense Stearn

Species of flowering plant

Allium lehmannii is a plant species endemic to southern Italy. It is found only the Island of Sicily in the Mediterranean and in the nearby Calabria region of the Italian mainland.

Allium lehmannii is a perennial, bulb-forming herb up to 30 cm tall. Leaves are very narrow and thread-like. Flowers are narrowly bell-shaped, the tepal tips spreading outwards but most of the tepals wrapping closely around the anthers and style. Tepals are white with a deep violet midvein.
