= Allium cupani =

Scientific classification
- Kingdom: Plantae
- Clade: Tracheophytes
- Clade: Angiosperms
- Clade: Monocots
- Order: Asparagales
- Family: Amaryllidaceae
- Subfamily: Allioideae
- Genus: Allium
- Species: A. cupani

Binomial name
- Allium cupani Raf. (1810)

Subspecies
- Allium cupani subsp. cupani; Allium cupani subsp. cyprium Meikle

Synonyms
- Allium cupani f. typicum Vindt (1953), not validly publ.; Allium cupani var. typicum Halácsy (1904), not validly publ.

Species of flowering plant

Allium cupani Raf. is a species of wild onion from the central and eastern Mediterranean region.

== Subspecies ==
Two subspecies are accepted.

- Allium cupani subsp. cupani (synonyms A. luridum Lojac., A. montanum Ten., A. montanum var. subvinale Ten., A. ochraceum Formánek, A. pusillum C.Presl, A. vaginatum Pančić) – Morocco and Algeria, central Italy, Sicily, former Yugoslavia, Albania, Bulgaria, mainland Greece, and east Aegean Islands (Psara)
- Allium cupani subsp. cyprium Meikle – Cyprus
