= Allium tenuiflorum =

Scientific classification
- Kingdom: Plantae
- Clade: Tracheophytes
- Clade: Angiosperms
- Clade: Monocots
- Order: Asparagales
- Family: Amaryllidaceae
- Subfamily: Allioideae
- Genus: Allium
- Subgenus: A. subg. Allium
- Species: A. tenuiflorum

Binomial name
- Allium tenuiflorum Ten. 1814 not Delastre 1842

Synonyms
- Allium montanum Guss. 1826, illegitimate homonym not F.W. Schmidt 1794; Allium pallens subsp. tenuiflorum (Ten.) Stearn; Allium paniculatum var. tenoreanum Maire & Weiller; Allium paniculatum subsp. tenuiflorum (Ten.) K.Richt.; Allium tenuiflorum var. pseudotenuiflorum Pamp.; Allium tenuifolium Friv. 1828, illegitimate homonym not Salisb. 1796

Species of flowering plant

Allium tenuiflorum is a Mediterranean species of wild onion found in Algeria, Morocco, Libya, Italy including Sardinia, and the Balkans.

Allium tenuiflorum produces a bulb up to 20 mm long. Scape is up to 40 cm tall. Umbel is lax with uneven pedicels. Flowers are bell-shaped, tepals white with green or purple midveins and white anthers. Ovary at flowering time yellow-green.
