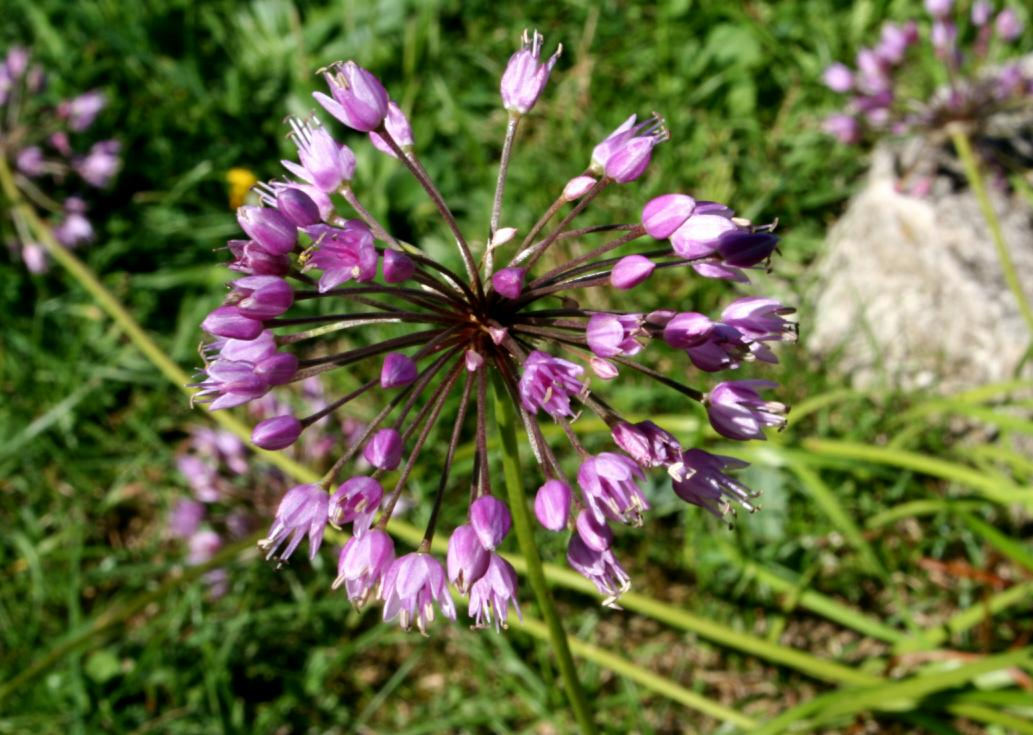

Scientific classification
- Kingdom: Plantae
- Clade: Embryophytes
- Clade: Tracheophytes
- Clade: Angiosperms
- Clade: Monocots
- Order: Asparagales
- Family: Amaryllidaceae
- Subfamily: Allioideae
- Genus: Allium
- Subgenus: A. subg. Rhizirideum
- Species: A. lusitanicum

Binomial name
- Allium lusitanicum Lam.

Synonyms
- Allium acutangulum Rchb.; Allium acutangulum Ambros.; Allium angulosum DC.; Allium angulosum var. montanum Pohl; Allium fallax Schult. & Schult.f.; Allium fallax subsp. montanum (Pohl) Fr.; Allium fallens Bubani; Allium leptophyllum Schur; Allium montanum F.W.Schmidt; Allium montanum var. fallax (Schult. & Schult.f.) Nyman; Allium montanum subsp. leptophyllum (Schur) Soó; Allium montanum var. leptophyllum (Schur) Nyman; Allium montanum subsp. lusitanicum (Lam.) Nyman; Allium montanum f. subbulbiliferum Priszter; Allium petraeum Genty; Allium schoenoprasum subsp. lusitanicum (Lam.) K.Richt.; Allium senescens Host; Allium senescens subsp. lusitanicum (Lam.) Dostál; Allium senescens subsp. montanum (Pohl) Holub

= Allium lusitanicum =

Portuguese onion or mountain onion

Species of flowering plant

Allium lusitanicum is a plant species widespread over much of Europe, mostly in mountainous regions. It has been reported from every country on the continent from Portugal to Ukraine except Iceland, Ireland, the United Kingdom, Netherlands, Belgium, Luxembourg, Denmark, Finland, Albania and Greece.

Allium lusitanicumm is a bulb-forming perennial with thread-like leaves shorter than the stipes. Stipes are up to 20 cm tall. Tepals, anthers and styles are all a uniform shade of rose-violet.
