= Wild onion =

Wild onion can refer to

- any uncultivated species in the genus Allium, especially:
  - Allium bisceptrum
  - Allium canadense
  - Allium tricoccum
  - Allium validum
  - Allium vineale
  - Allium ochotense
- Asphodelus tenuifolius
- Cyperus bulbosus
- Bulbine semibarbata

== See also ==
- Wild garlic
