= Starter bulb =

Immature bulbs used to propagate onions

Starter bulbs, also known as sets, are immature bulbs used in horticulture to propagate onions (Allium cepa). Because onions can take more than 5–6 months to reach maturity, many growers with shorter growing windows prefer to grow onions from starter bulbs rather than seed.

Onion seeds are cultivated in the spring and the resultant bulbs are harvested in autumn. These bulbs are similar in appearance to the mature onion, but much smaller in size. The starter bulbs are stored in a cool, dark place over winter. The next spring, the starter bulbs are planted in rows, 8 to 10 cm (3 to 4 in) apart. Although this method ensures a larger mature onion, it is more costly.

== See also ==
- List of Allium species
- List of onion cultivars
