= Allium asarense =

Conservation status
- Data Deficient (IUCN 3.1)

Scientific classification
- Kingdom: Plantae
- Clade: Embryophytes
- Clade: Tracheophytes
- Clade: Spermatophytes
- Clade: Angiosperms
- Clade: Monocots
- Order: Asparagales
- Family: Amaryllidaceae
- Subfamily: Allioideae
- Genus: Allium
- Subgenus: A. subg. Cepa
- Species: A. asarense

Binomial name
- Allium asarense R.M.Fritsch & Matin

Species of flowering plant

Allium asarense is a species of wild onion in the family Amaryllidaceae, native to north-central Iran. Out of the approximately 1000 species of Allium it and Allium vavilovii are the closest known relatives of the common onion Allium cepa.

== Distribution and habitat ==
Allium asarense is endemic to Iran, where it is found only in the north-central region of the country.

This species grows in limestone, rocky slopes where it inhabits habitats such as cliffs and mountain peaks, at altitudes of about 2,000 m (6,600 ft) above sea level.
