= Allium vavilovii =

Scientific classification
- Kingdom: Plantae
- Clade: Embryophytes
- Clade: Tracheophytes
- Clade: Spermatophytes
- Clade: Angiosperms
- Clade: Monocots
- Order: Asparagales
- Family: Amaryllidaceae
- Subfamily: Allioideae
- Genus: Allium
- Species: A. vavilovii

Binomial name
- Allium vavilovii Popov & Vved.

Species of flowering plant

Allium vavilovii is a species of wild onion in the family Amaryllidaceae, native to southern Turkmenistan and northeastern Iran. Out of the approximately 1000 species of Allium it and Allium asarense are the closest known relatives of the common onion Allium cepa.
