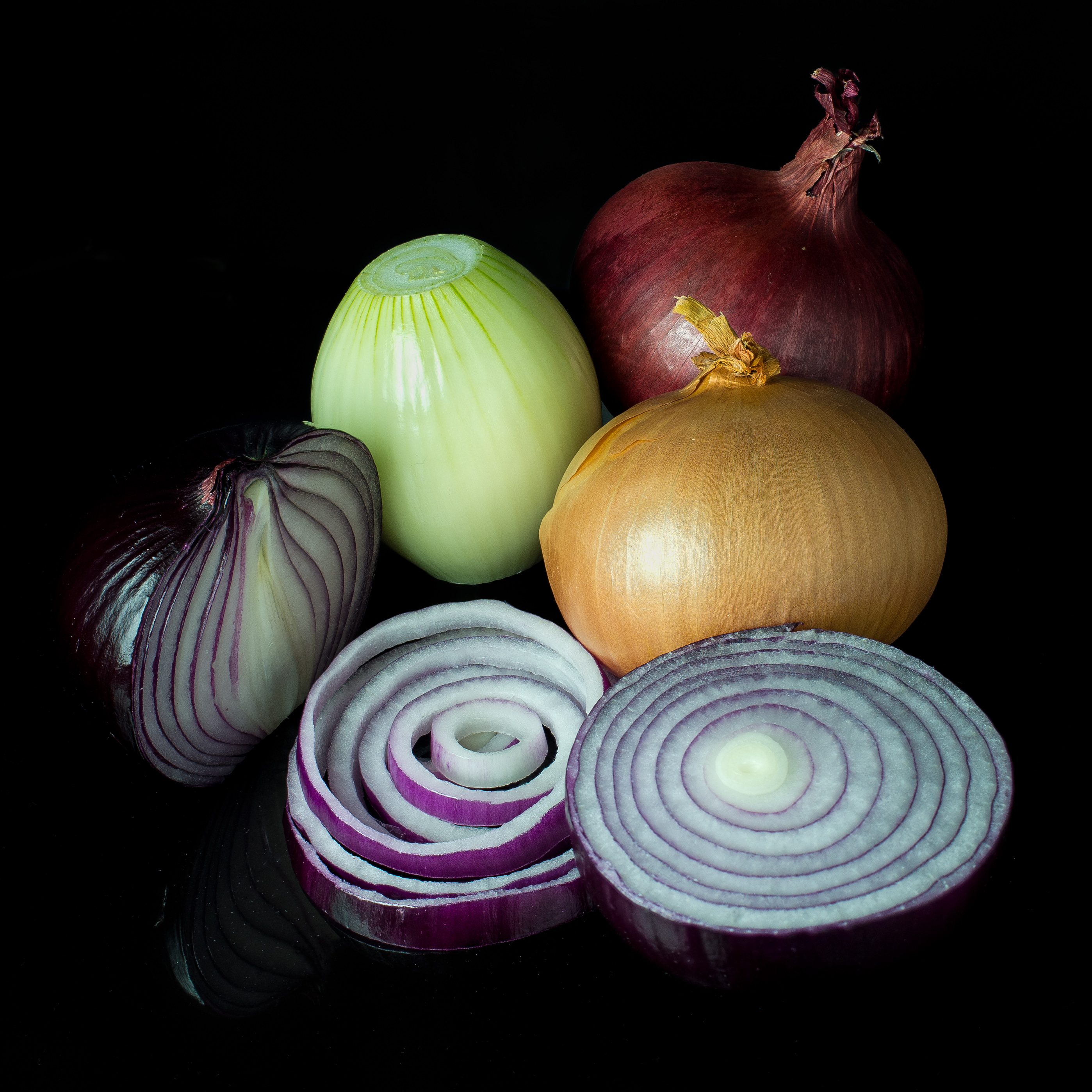
- A display of commercially-grown bulbs, including red and yellow cultivars

Scientific classification
- Kingdom: Plantae
- Clade: Tracheophytes
- Clade: Angiosperms
- Clade: Monocots
- Order: Asparagales
- Family: Amaryllidaceae
- Subfamily: Allioideae
- Genus: Allium
- Subgenus: A. subg. Cepa
- Species: A. cepa

Binomial name
- Allium cepa L.

Synonyms
- Species synonymy: Allium angolense Baker; Allium aobanum Araki; Allium ascalonicum auct.; Allium ascalonicum var. condensum Millán; Allium ascalonicum var. fertile Millán; Allium ascalonicum var. majus Gorrie; Allium ascalonicum f. rotterianum Voss ex J.Becker; Allium ascalonicum var. sterile Millán; Allium cepa var. aggregatum G.Don; Allium cepa var. anglicum Alef.; Allium cepa var. argenteum Alef.; Allium cepa var. bifolium Alef.; Allium cepa var. crinides Alef.; Allium cepa var. flandricum Alef.; Allium cepa var. globosum Alef.; Allium cepa var. hispanicum Alef.; Allium cepa var. jamesii Alef.; Allium cepa var. lisboanum Alef.; Allium cepa var. luteum Alef.; Allium cepa var. multiplicans L.H.Bailey; Allium cepa var. portanum Alef.; Allium cepa var. praecox Alef.; Allium cepa var. roseum Alef.; Allium cepa var. sanguineum Alef.; Allium cepa var. solaninum Alef.; Allium cepa var. tripolitanum Alef.; Allium cepa var. viviparum (Metzg.) Alef.; Allium cepa f. viviparum Metzg.; Allium cepaeum St.-Lag.; Allium commune Noronha, nom. nud.; Allium cumaria Buch.-Ham. ex Wall., nom. nud.; Allium esculentum Salisb.; Allium napus Pall. ex Kunth; Allium nigritanum A.Chev., nom. nud.; Allium pauciflorum Willd. ex Ledeb.; Allium salota Dostál; Ascalonicum sativum P.Renault; Cepa alba P.Renault; Cepa esculenta Gray; Cepa esculenta var. hispanica Gray; Cepa esculenta var. ramosa Gray; Cepa esculenta var. rubra Gray; Cepa pallens P.Renault; Cepa rubra P.Renault; Cepa vulgaris Garsault; Kepa esculenta Raf.; Porrum cepa (L.) Rchb.

= Onion =

Bulbous vegetable

The onion (Allium cepa L., from Latin cepa), also known as the bulb onion or common onion, is a vegetable that is the most widely cultivated species of the genus Allium. The shallot is a botanical variety of the onion which was classified as a separate species until 2011. The onion's close relatives include garlic, scallion, leek, and chives.

The genus contains several other species cultivated for food, such as the Japanese bunching onion Allium fistulosum, the tree onion Allium × proliferum, and the Canada onion Allium canadense. The name wild onion is applied to a number of Allium species, but A. cepa is exclusively known from cultivation. Its ancestral wild original form is not known, although escapes from cultivation have become established in some regions. The onion is most frequently a biennial or a perennial plant, but is usually treated as an annual and harvested in its first growing season.

The onion plant has a fan of hollow, bluish-green leaves, and its bulb at the base of the plant begins to swell when a certain day-length is reached. The bulbs are composed of shortened, compressed, underground stems surrounded by fleshy modified scale (leaves) that envelop a central bud at the tip of the stem. In the autumn (or in spring, in the case of overwintering onions), the foliage dies down and the outer layers of the bulb become more dry, and brittle. The crop is harvested and dried and the onions are ready for use or storage. The crop is prone to attack by a number of pests and diseases, particularly the onion fly, the onion eelworm, and various fungi which can cause rotting. Some varieties of A. cepa, such as shallots and potato onions, produce multiple bulbs.

Onions are cultivated and used around the world. As a food item, they are often served raw as a vegetable or part of a prepared savoury dish, but can be eaten cooked or used to make pickles or chutneys. They are pungent when chopped and contain certain chemical substances which may irritate the eyes.

== Taxonomy and etymology ==
The onion plant (Allium cepa), also known as the bulb onion or common onion, is the most widely cultivated species of the genus Allium. It was first officially described by Carl Linnaeus in his 1753 work Species Plantarum. Synonyms during its taxonomic history are:

- Allium cepa var. aggregatum – G. Don
- Allium cepa var. bulbiferum – Regel
- Allium cepa var. cepa – Linnaeus
- Allium cepa var. multiplicans – L.H. Bailey
- Allium cepa var. proliferum – (Moench) Regel
- Allium cepa var. solaninum – Alef
- Allium cepa var. viviparum – (Metz) Mansf.

A. cepa is known exclusively from cultivation, but related wild species occur in Central Asia and Iran. The most closely related include A. vavilovii from Turkmenistan and A. asarense from Iran. The genus Allium contains other species variously called onions and cultivated for food, such as the Japanese bunching onion (A. fistulosum), Egyptian onion (A. × proliferum), and Canada onion (A. canadense). The vast majority of cultivars of A. cepa belong to the common onion group (A. cepa var. cepa) and are usually referred to simply as onions. The Aggregatum Group of cultivars (A. cepa var. aggregatum) includes both shallots, formerly classed as a separate species, and potato onions. Related species include garlic, leek, and chives.

Cepa is commonly accepted as Latin for "onion"; the generic name Allium is the classical Latin name for garlic. It has an affinity with Spanish: cebolla, Italian: cipolla, Polish: cebula, and the German Zwiebel (this last altered by folk etymology). The English word "chive" is from the Old French chive, in turn from cepa.

== Description ==
The onion is a biennial plant but is usually grown as an annual. Modern varieties typically grow to a height of 15 to 45 cm (6 to 18 in). The leaves are yellowish- to bluish green and grow alternately in a flattened, fan-shaped swathe. They are fleshy, hollow, and cylindrical, with one flattened side. They are at their broadest about a quarter of the way up, beyond which they taper to blunt tips. The base of each leaf is a flattened, usually white sheath that grows out of the basal plate of a bulb. From the underside of the plate, a bundle of fibrous roots extends for a short way into the soil. As the onion matures, food reserves accumulate in the leaf bases, and the bulb of the onion swells.

In the autumn, the leaves die back, and the outer scales of the bulb become dry and brittle, so the crop is normally harvested. If left in the soil over winter, the growing point in the middle of the bulb begins to develop in the spring. New leaves appear, and a long, stout, hollow stem expands, topped by a bract protecting a developing inflorescence. The inflorescence takes the form of a rounded umbel of white flowers with parts in sixes. The seeds are glossy black and triangular in cross-section. The average pH of an onion is around 5.5.

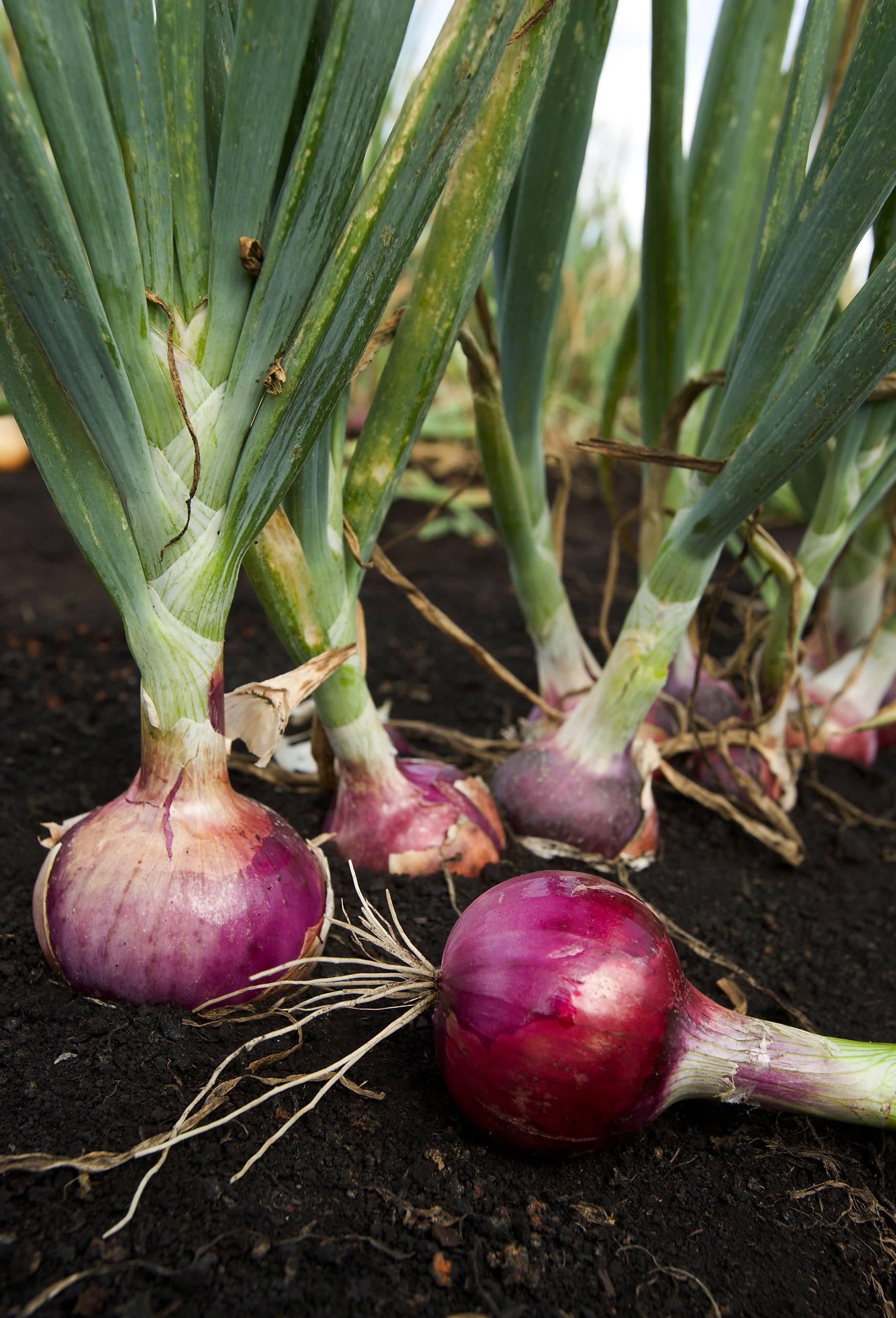
Roots, leaves and developing bulb

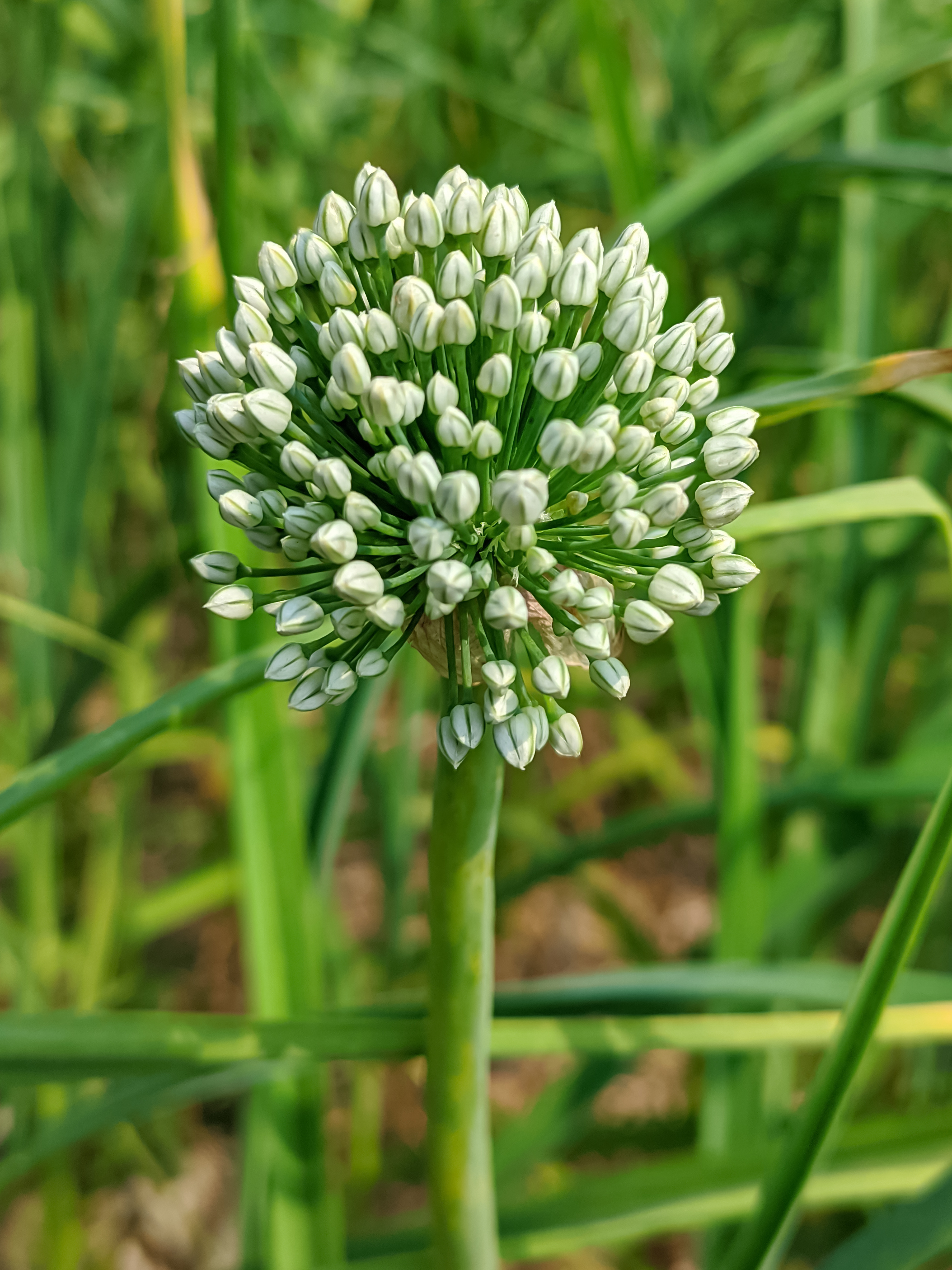
Inflorescence with flower buds

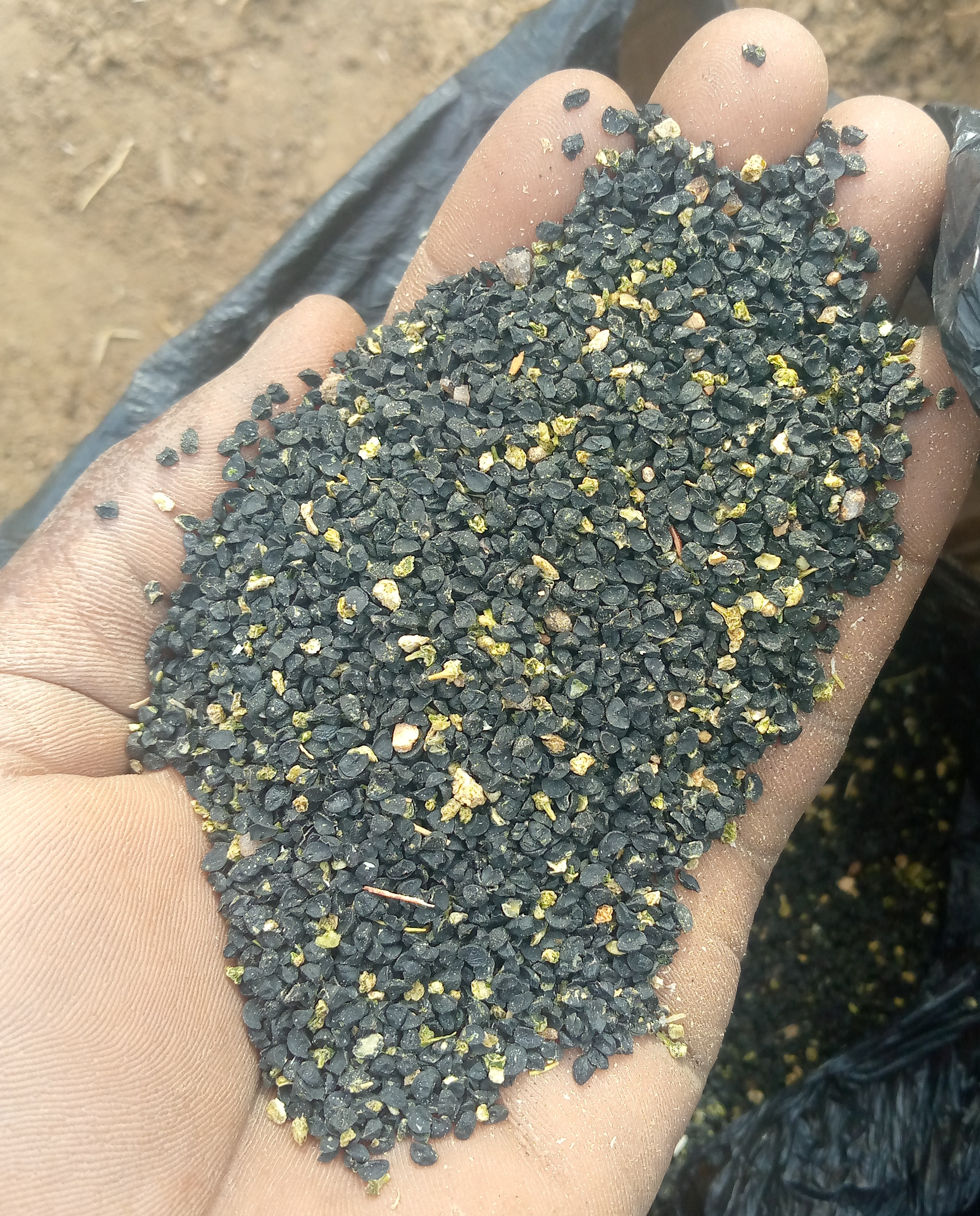
Seeds

== History ==
Onions have been variously described as having originated in Iran, western Pakistan and Central Asia. Humans have grown and selectively bred onions in cultivation for at least 7,000 years. The geographic origin of the onion is uncertain; ancient records of onion use span both eastern and western Asia. Domestication likely took place in West or Central Asia. The onion species Allium fistulosum (spring onion, bunching onion) and Allium tuberosum (Chinese leek) were domesticated in China around 6000 BC alongside other vegetables, grains, and fruits.

Ancient Mesopotamian recipes that used onions and other Allium species were recorded in cuneiform script on the Yale culinary tablets. The tablets, dating from around 2000 BC, are the oldest known recipes in the world. The Assyriologist and "gourmet cook" Jean Bottero stated this was "a cuisine of striking richness, refinement, sophistication and artistry". The onion is mentioned in the Hebrew Bible; evidence of onions in ancient Israel comes from Chalcolithic Nahal Mishmar and from Bronze Age Jericho.

Ancient Egyptians revered the onion bulb, viewing its spherical shape and concentric rings as symbols of eternal life. Onions were used in Egyptian burials, as evidenced by onion traces found in the eye sockets of Ramesses IV. Pliny the Elder of the first century AD wrote about the use of onions and cabbage in Pompeii. He documented Roman beliefs about the onion's ability to improve ocular ailments, aid in sleep, and heal everything from oral sores and toothaches to dog bites, lumbago, and even dysentery. Archaeologists unearthing Pompeii long after its 79 AD volcanic burial have found gardens resembling those in Pliny's detailed narratives. According to texts collected in the fifth/sixth century AD under the authorial aegis of "Apicius" (said to have been a gourmet), onions were used in many Roman recipes.

In the Age of Discovery, onions were taken to North America by the first European settlers in the Columbian exchange. They found close relatives such as Allium tricoccum readily available and widely used in Native American gastronomy. According to diaries kept by early English colonists, the bulb onion was one of the first crops planted in North America by the Pilgrim fathers. Between 1883 and 1939, inventors in the United States patented 97 inventions meant to make onion-growing more efficient through automation.

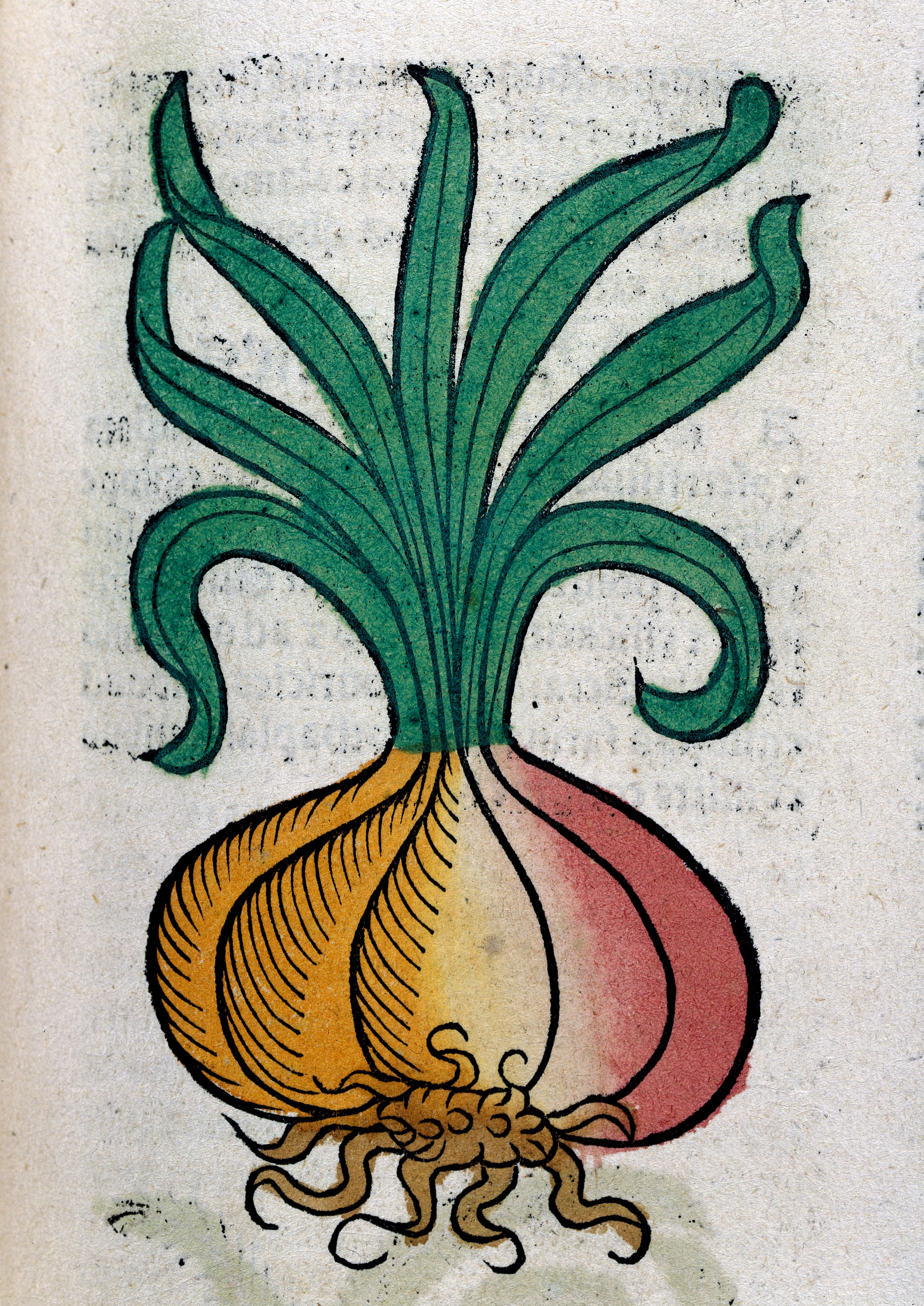
Woodcut print of an onion, from Hortus Sanitatis, 1547

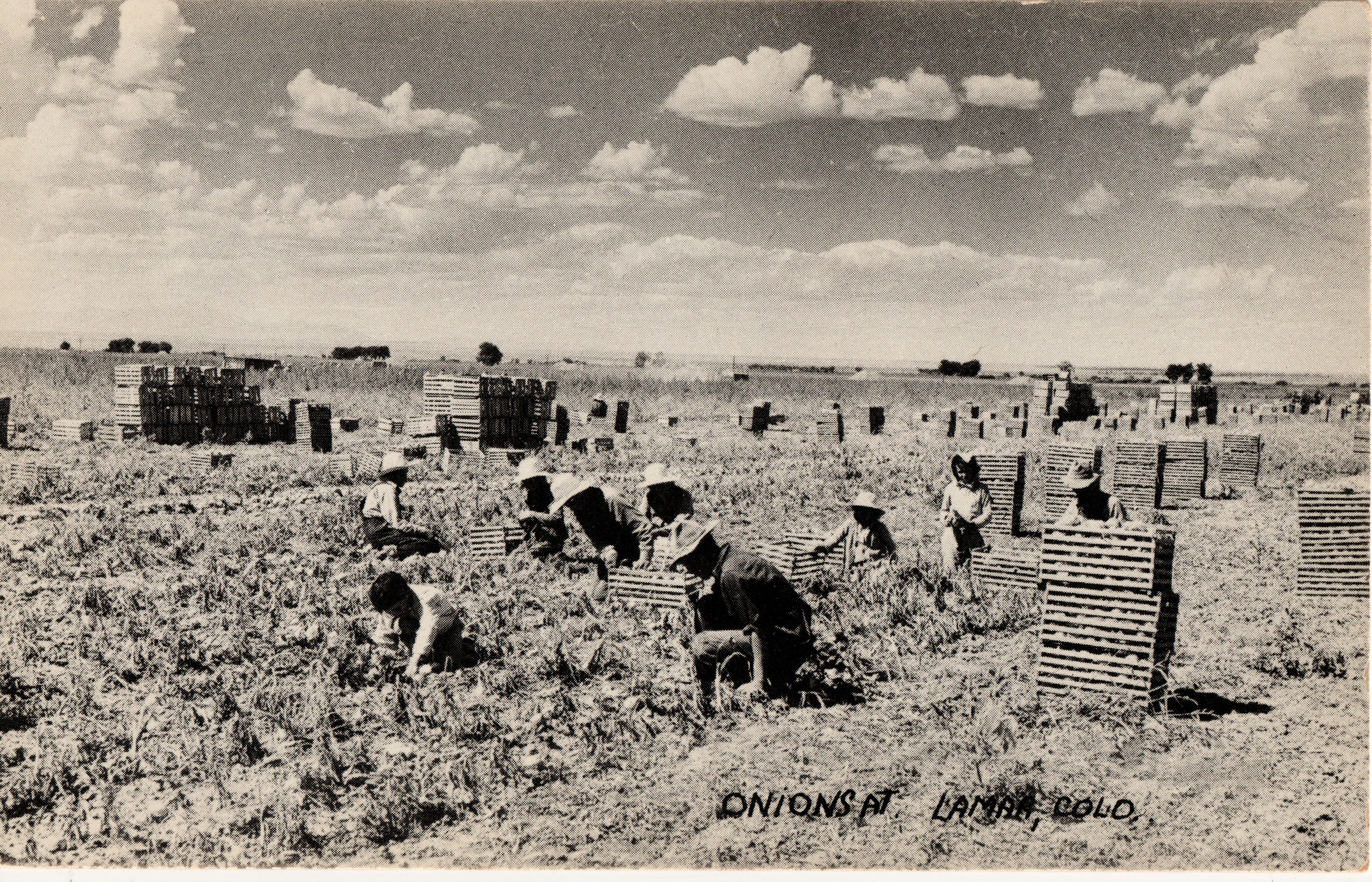
Onions being harvested in Lamar, Colorado. First half of the 20th century

== Uses ==
Yearly per capita supply of onions

=== Culinary ===
Onions come in three colour varieties:

- Yellow or brown onions are sweet, with many cultivars bred specifically to accentuate this sweetness, such as Vidalia, Walla Walla, Cévennes, and Bermuda. Yellow onions turn a rich, dark brown when caramelised and are used to add a sweet flavour to various dishes, such as French onion soup.
- Red or purple onions, known for their sharp pungent flavour, are commonly cooked in many cuisines, and used raw and in grilling.
- White onions are mild in flavour; they have a golden colour when cooked and a particularly sweet flavour when sautéed.

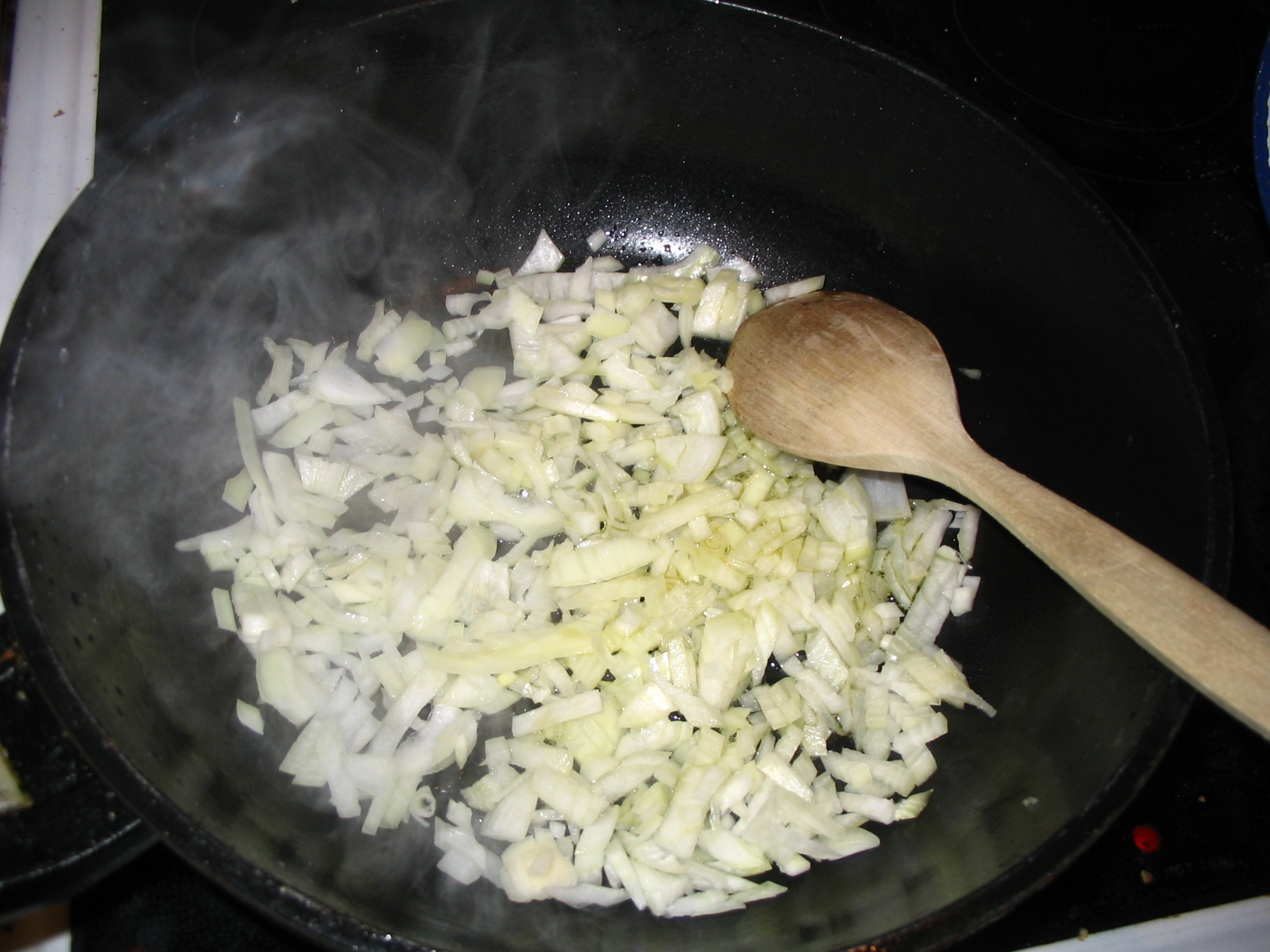
Sautéing onions

Onions are commonly chopped and used as an ingredient in various hearty warm dishes, and may be used as a main ingredient in their own right, for example in French onion soup, creamed onions, and onion chutney. They are versatile and can be baked, boiled, braised, grilled, fried, roasted, sautéed, or eaten raw in salads. Onions are a major ingredient of some curries; the Persian-style dopiaza's name means "double onion", and it is used both in the dish's sour curry sauce and as a garnish. Onion powder is a seasoning made from finely ground, dehydrated onions; it is often included in seasoned salt and spice mixes.

While the large, mature onion bulb is what is most often eaten, onions can be eaten at immature stages. Young plants may be harvested before bulbing occurs and used whole as spring onions or scallions. When an onion is harvested after bulbing has begun, but the onion is not yet mature, the plants are sometimes referred to as "summer" onions. Onions may be bred and grown to mature at smaller sizes, known as pearl, boiler, or pickler onions; these are not true pearl onions which are a different species. Pearl and boiler onions may be cooked as a vegetable rather than as an ingredient, while pickler onions are often preserved in vinegar as a long-lasting relish. Onions pickled in vinegar are eaten as a side serving with traditional pub food such as ploughman's lunch.

=== Other uses ===
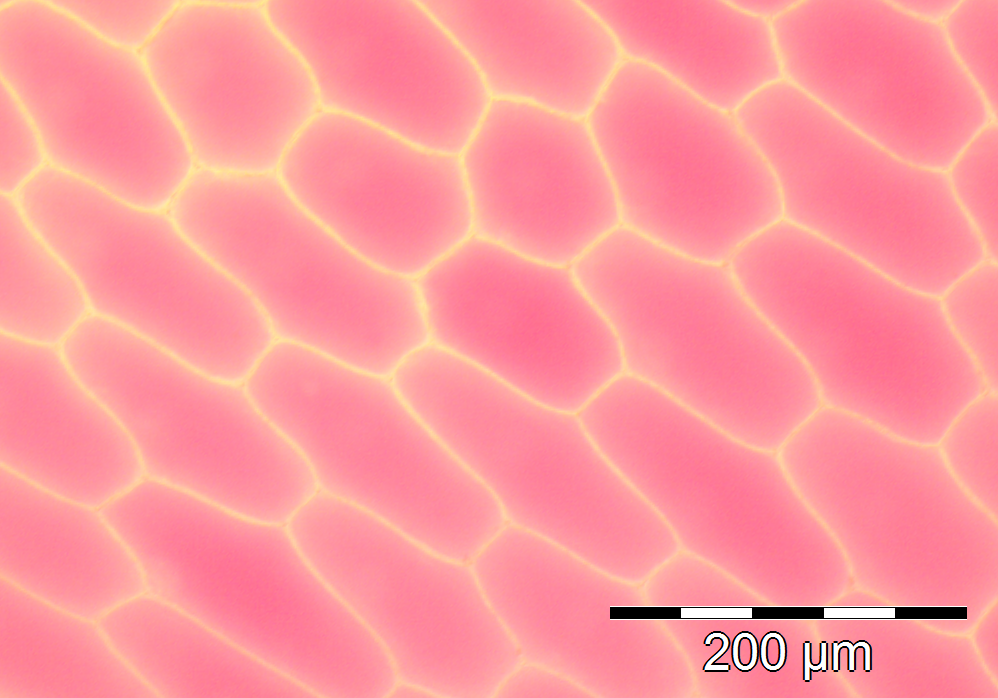
Onion epidermis cells are visible in true color with minimal magnification.

Onions have particularly large cells that are easy to observe under low magnification. Forming a single layer of cells, the bulb epidermis is easy to separate for educational, experimental, and breeding purposes. Onions are therefore commonly used in science education to teach the use of a microscope for observing cell structure. Onion skins can be boiled to make an orange-brown dye.

== Composition ==
=== Nutrients ===
Raw onion bulbs
Nutritional value per 100 g (3.5 oz)
- Energy: 166 kJ (40 kcal)
- Carbohydrates: 9.34 g
- Sugars: 4.24 g
- Dietary fibre: 1.7 g
- Fat: 0.1 g
- Protein: 1.1 g
Vitamins and minerals
Vitamins	Quantity %DV^{†}
Thiamine (B1)	4% 0.046 mg
Riboflavin (B2)	2% 0.027 mg
Niacin (B3)	1% 0.116 mg
Pantothenic acid (B5)	2% 0.123 mg
Vitamin B6	7% 0.12 mg
Folate (B9)	5% 19 μg
Vitamin C	8% 7.4 mg
Minerals	Quantity %DV^{†}
Calcium	2% 23 mg
Iron	1% 0.21 mg
Magnesium	2% 10 mg
Manganese	6% 0.129 mg
Phosphorus	2% 29 mg
Potassium	5% 146 mg
Zinc	2% 0.17 mg
- Other constituents: Quantity
- Water: 89.11 g
- Fluoride: 1.1 µg
- Link to USDA Database entry
- ^{†}Percentages estimated using US recommendations for adults, except for potassium, which is estimated based on expert recommendation from the National Academies.

Most onion cultivars are about 89% water, 9% carbohydrates (including 4% sugar and 2% dietary fibre), 1% protein, and negligible fat (table). Onions contain low amounts of essential nutrients and have an energy value of 166 kJ (40 kilocalories) in a 100 g (3.5 oz) amount. Onions contribute savoury flavour to dishes without contributing significant caloric content.

=== Phytochemicals ===
Onion varieties vary widely in phytochemical content, particularly for polyphenols, with shallots having the highest level, six times the amount found in Vidalia onions. Yellow onions have the highest total flavonoid content, an amount 11 times higher than in white onions. Red onions have considerable content of anthocyanin pigments, with at least 25 different compounds identified representing 10% of total flavonoid content. Like garlic, onions can show an additional colour – pink-red – after cutting, an effect caused by reactions of amino acids with sulfur compounds. Onion polyphenols are under basic research to determine their possible biological properties in humans.

== Adverse effects ==
Some people suffer from allergic reactions after handling onions. Symptoms can include contact dermatitis, intense itching, rhinoconjunctivitis, blurred vision, bronchial asthma, sweating, and anaphylaxis. Allergic reactions may not occur when eating cooked onions, possibly due to the denaturing of the proteins from cooking.

=== Eye irritation ===
Freshly cut onions can produce a stinging sensation in the eyes of people nearby and often uncontrollable tears. This is caused by the release of a volatile liquid, syn-propanethial-S-oxide and its aerosol, which stimulates nerves in the eye. This gas is produced by a chain of reactions which serve as a defence mechanism: chopping an onion causes damage to cells which releases enzymes called alliinases. These break down amino acid sulfoxides and generate sulfenic acids. A specific sulfenic acid, 1-propenesulfenic acid, is rapidly acted on by a second enzyme, the lacrimatory factor synthase (LFS), producing the syn-propanethial-S-oxide. This gas diffuses through the air and soon reaches the eyes, where it activates sensory neurons. Lacrimal glands produce tears to dilute and flush out the irritant. Eye irritation can be minimised by cutting onions under running water or submerged in a basin of water. Leaving the root end intact also reduces irritation as the onion base has a higher concentration of sulphur compounds than the rest of the bulb.

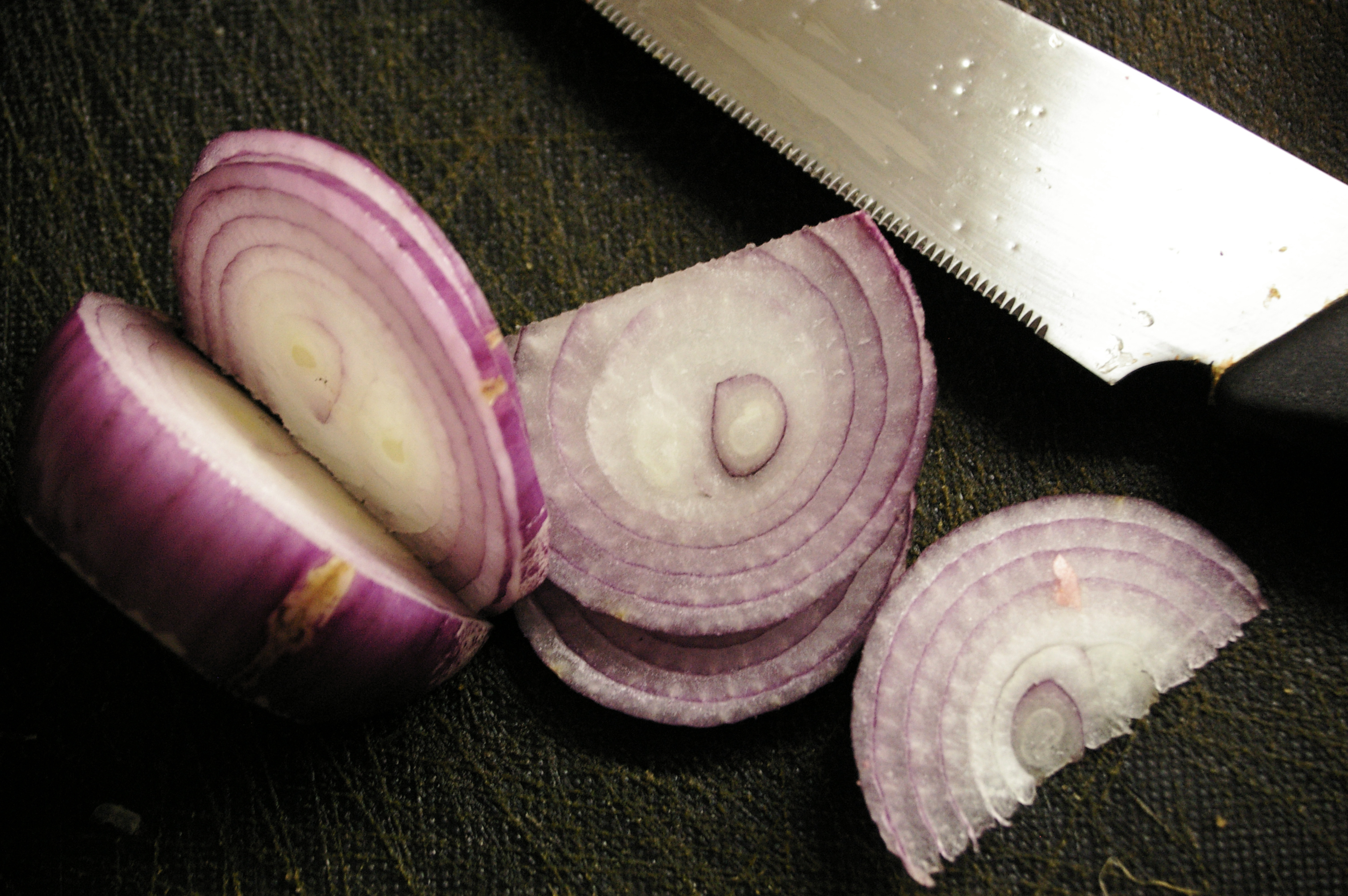
Cut onions emit a chemical compound which cause the lacrimal glands in the eyes to become irritated, releasing tears.

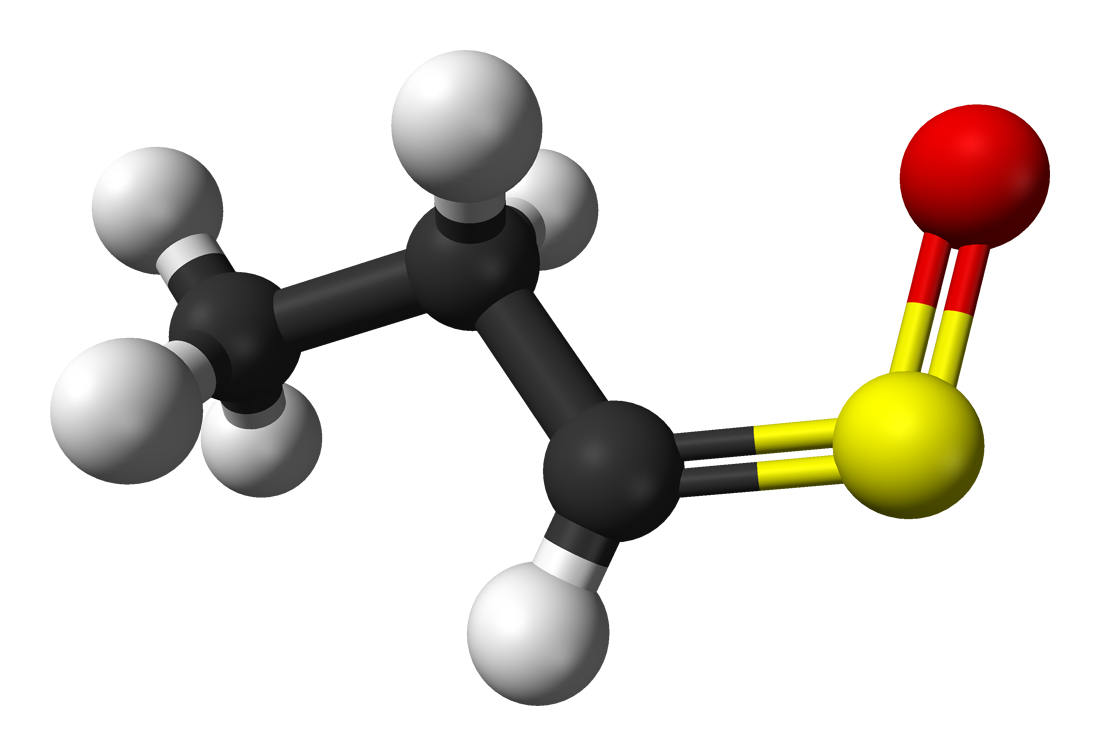
Model of syn-propanethial-S-oxide, the volatile molecule that causes eye irritation

The amount of sulfenic acids and lacrimal factor released and the irritation effect differs among Allium species. In 2008, the New Zealand Institute for Crop and Food Research created "no tears" onions by genetic modification to prevent the synthesis of lachrymatory factor synthase in onions. One study suggests that consumers prefer the flavour of onions with lower LFS content. Since the process impedes sulfur ingestion by the plant, some find LFS− onions inferior in flavour.

A method for efficiently differentiating LFS− and LFS+ onions has been developed based on mass spectrometry, with potential application in high-volume production; gas chromatography is also used to measure lachrymatory factor in onions. In early 2018, Bayer released the first crop yield of commercially available LFS-silenced onions under the name "Sunions". They were the product of 30 years of cross-breeding; genetic modification was not employed.

Guinea hen weed and honey garlic contain a similar lachrymatory factor. Synthetic onion lachrymatory factor has been used in a study related to tear production, and has been proposed as a nonlethal deterrent against thieves and intruders.

=== Other effects ===
Onions are toxic to animals including dogs, cats.

Onions can accumulate heavy metals such as cadmium and lead, particularly when cultivated in contaminated soils. The European Union regulates the presence of these contaminants. Several studies monitoring onion crops have reported cadmium or lead concentrations that exceed regulatory limits.

== Producing onions ==
=== Cultivation ===
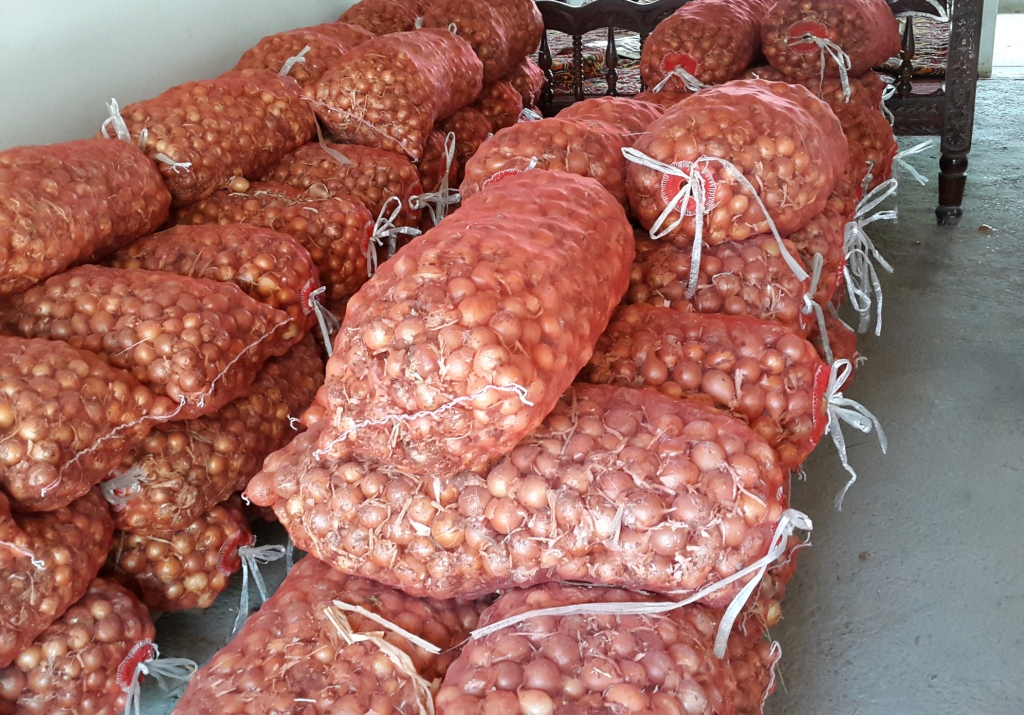
Onion bulbs to be planted for seed production

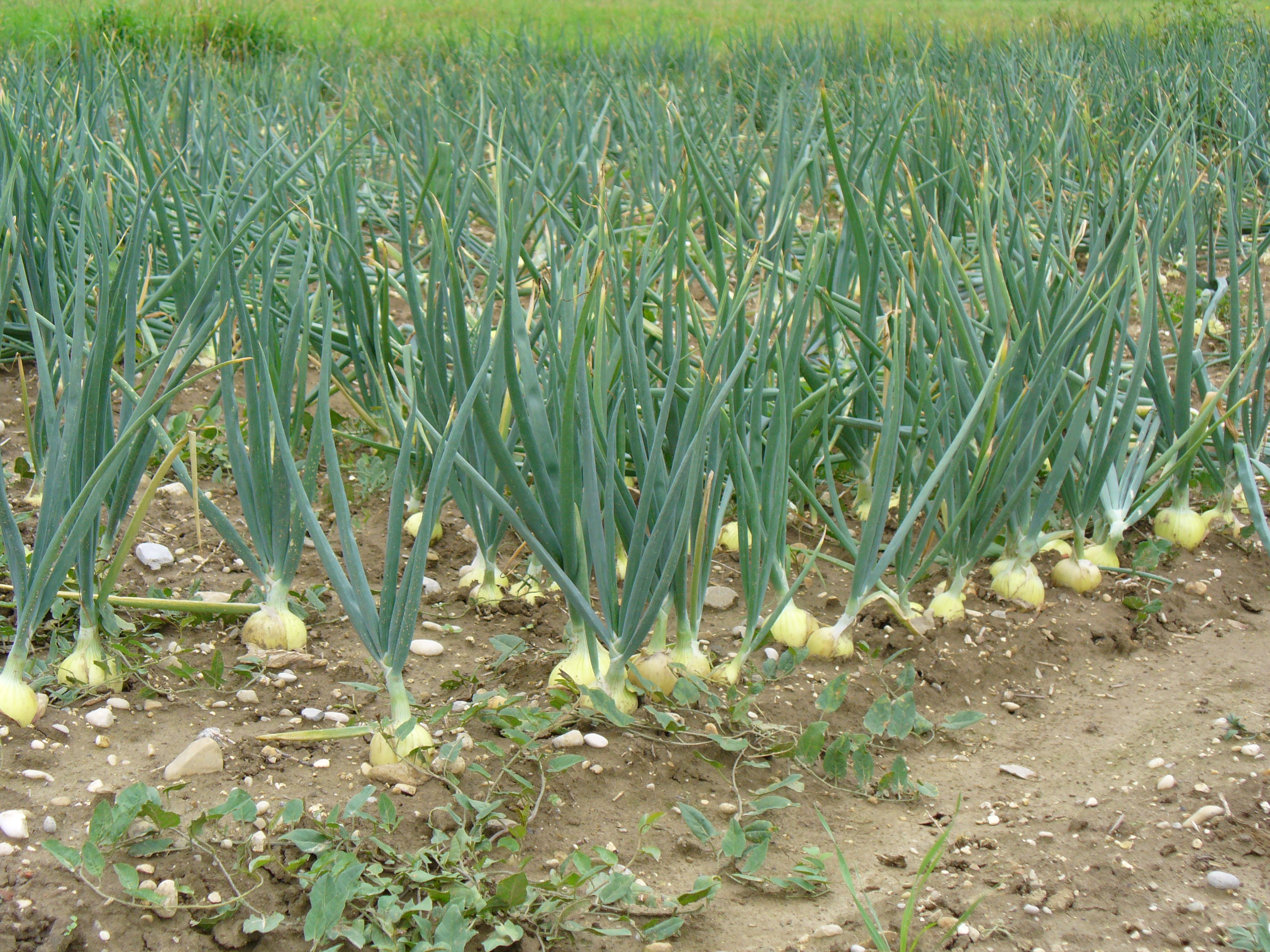
Large-scale onion cultivation

Onions are best cultivated in fertile, well-drained soils. Sandy loams are good as they are low in sulphur, whereas clay-rich soils usually have high sulphur content and produce pungent bulbs. Onions require a high level of nutrients in the soil. Phosphorus is often present in sufficient quantities, but may be applied before planting because of its low level of availability in cold soils. Nitrogen and potash can be applied at regular intervals during the growing season, the last application of nitrogen being at least four weeks before harvesting.

Bulbing onions are day-length sensitive; their bulbs begin growing only after the number of daylight hours has surpassed some minimal quantity. Most traditional European onions are referred to as "long-day" onions, producing bulbs only after 14 hours or more of daylight occurs. Southern European and North African varieties are often known as "intermediate-day" types, requiring only 12–13 hours of daylight to stimulate bulb formation. "Short-day" onions, which have been developed in more recent times, are planted in mild-winter areas in the autumn and form bulbs in the early spring and require only 11–12 hours of daylight to stimulate bulb formation. Onions are a cool-weather crop and can be grown in USDA zones 3 to 9. Hot temperatures or other stressful conditions cause them to "bolt", meaning that a flower stem begins to grow.

Onions are grown from seeds or from partially grown bulbs called "sets" or starter bulbs. Onion seeds are short-lived and fresh seeds germinate more effectively when sown in shallow rows, or "drills", with each drill 12 to 18 inches (30 to 46 cm) apart. In suitable climates, certain cultivars can be sown in late summer and autumn to overwinter in the ground and produce early crops the following year.

Onion bulbs are produced by sowing seeds in a dense pattern in early summer, then harvested in the autumn when the bulbs are still small, followed by drying and storage. These bulbs are planted the following spring and grow into mature bulbs later in the growing season. Certain cultivars used for growing and storing bulbs may not have as good storage characteristics as those grown directly from seed.

Routine care during the growing season involves keeping the rows free of competing weeds, especially when the plants are young. The plants are shallow-rooted and do not need much water when established. Bulbing usually takes place after 12 to 18 weeks. The bulbs can be gathered when needed to eat fresh, but if stored, they are harvested after the leaves have died back naturally. In dry weather, they may be left on the surface of the soil for a few days for drying, then are placed in nets, roped into strings, or laid in layers in shallow boxes to be stored in a cool, well-ventilated place.

=== Pests and diseases ===
Onions suffer from several pests and diseases. The most serious for the home gardener are likely to be the onion fly, stem and bulb eelworm, white rot, and neck rot. Diseases affecting the foliage include rust and smut, downy mildew, and white tip disease. The bulbs may be affected by splitting, white rot, and neck rot. Shanking is a condition in which the central leaves turn yellow and the inner part of the bulb collapses into an unpleasant-smelling slime. Most of these disorders are best treated by removing and burning affected plants. The larvae of the onion leaf miner or leek moth (Acrolepiopsis assectella) sometimes attack the foliage and may burrow down into the bulb.

The onion fly (Delia antiqua) lays eggs on the leaves and stems and on the ground close to onion, shallot, leek, and garlic plants. The fly is attracted to the crop by the smell of damaged tissue and is liable to occur after thinning. Plants grown from sets are less prone to attack. The larvae tunnel into the bulbs and the foliage wilts and turns yellow. The bulbs are disfigured and rot, especially in wet weather. Control measures may include crop rotation, the use of seed dressings, early sowing or planting, and the removal of infested plants.

The onion eelworm (Ditylenchus dipsaci), a tiny parasitic soil-living nematode, causes swollen, distorted foliage. Young plants are killed and older ones produce soft bulbs. No cure is known and affected plants should be uprooted and burned. The site should not be used for growing onions again for several years and should also be avoided for growing carrots, parsnips, and beans, which are also susceptible to the eelworm.

White rot of onions, leeks, and garlic is caused by the soil-borne fungus Sclerotium cepivorum. As the roots rot, the foliage turns yellow and wilts. The bases of the bulbs are attacked and become covered by a fluffy white mass of mycelia, which later produces small, globular black structures called sclerotia. These resting structures remain in the soil to reinfect a future crop. No cure for this fungal disease exists, so affected plants should be removed and destroyed and the ground used for unrelated crops in subsequent years.

Neck rot is a fungal disease affecting onions in storage. It is caused by Botrytis allii, which attacks the neck and upper parts of the bulb, causing a grey mould to develop. The symptoms often first occur where the bulb has been damaged and spread down the affected scales. Large quantities of spores are produced and crust-like sclerotia may also develop. In time, a dry rot sets in and the bulb becomes a dry, mummified structure. This disease may be present throughout the growing period, but only manifests itself when the bulb is in storage. Antifungal seed dressings are available and the disease can be minimised by preventing physical damage to the bulbs at harvesting, careful drying and curing of the mature onions, and correct storage in a cool, dry place with plenty of circulating air.

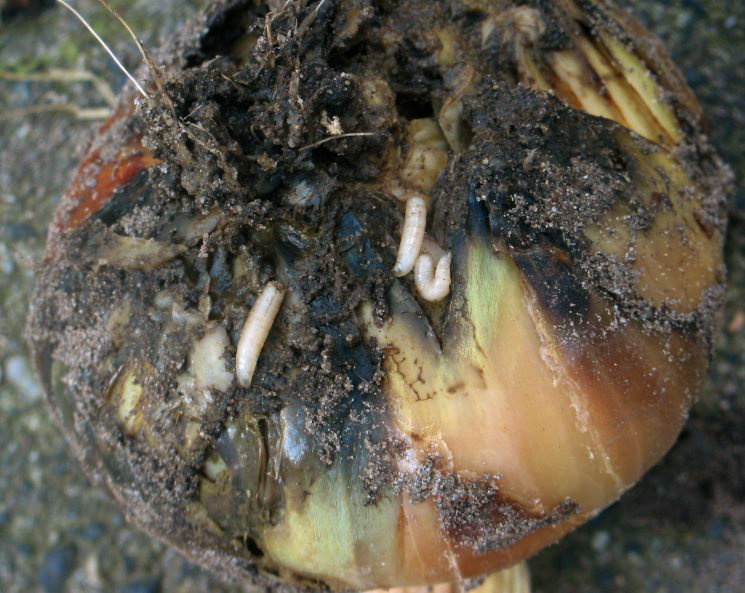
Larvae of the onion fly

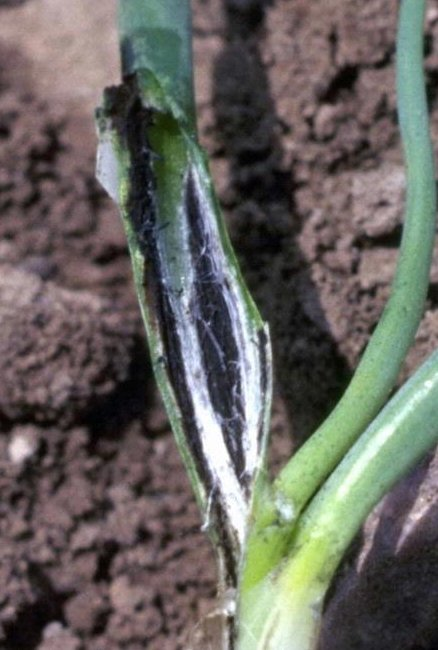
Onion smut, Urocystis colchici var. cepulae, on a seedling

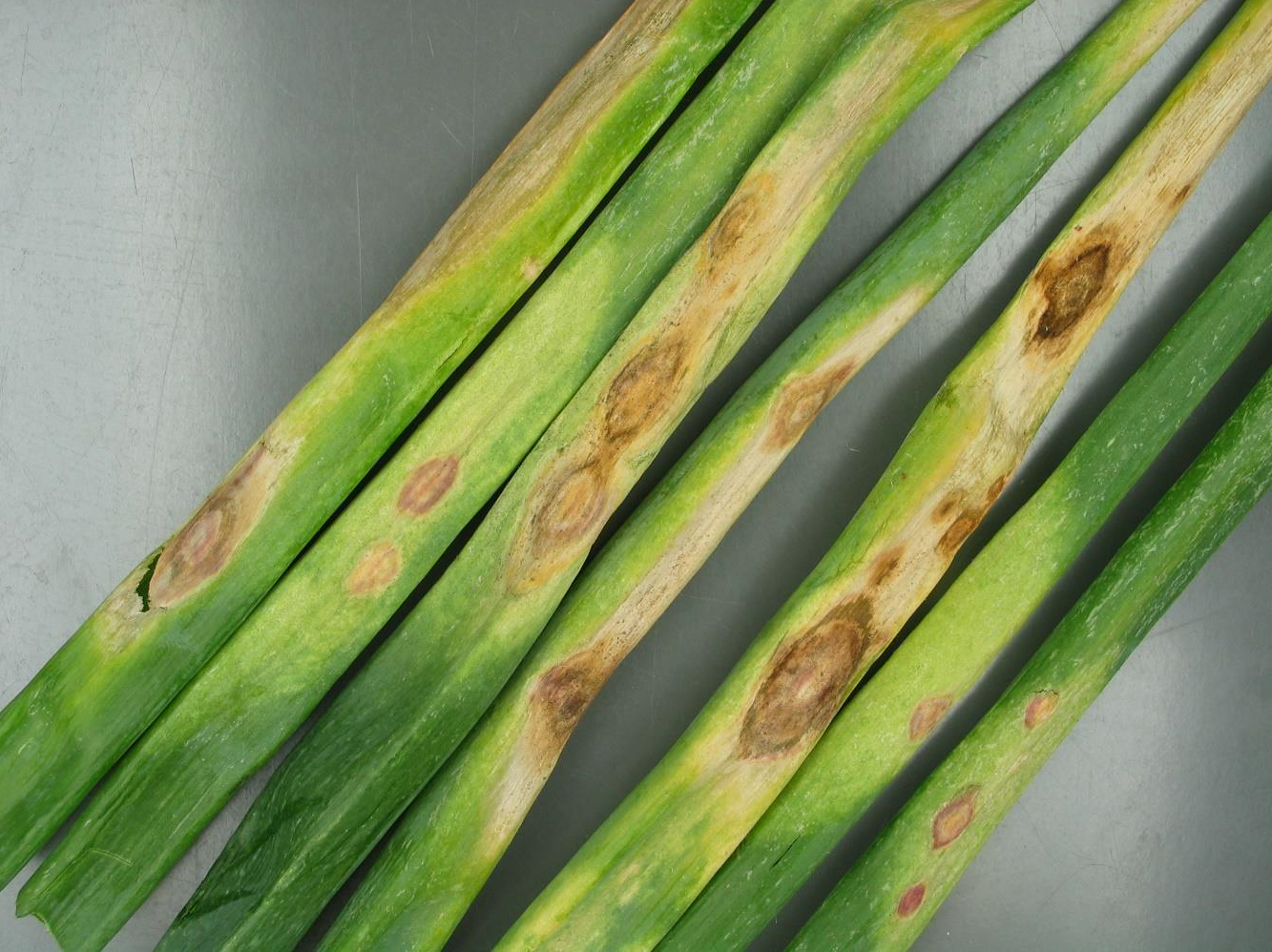
Onion leaf spot caused by Cladosporium allii-cepae

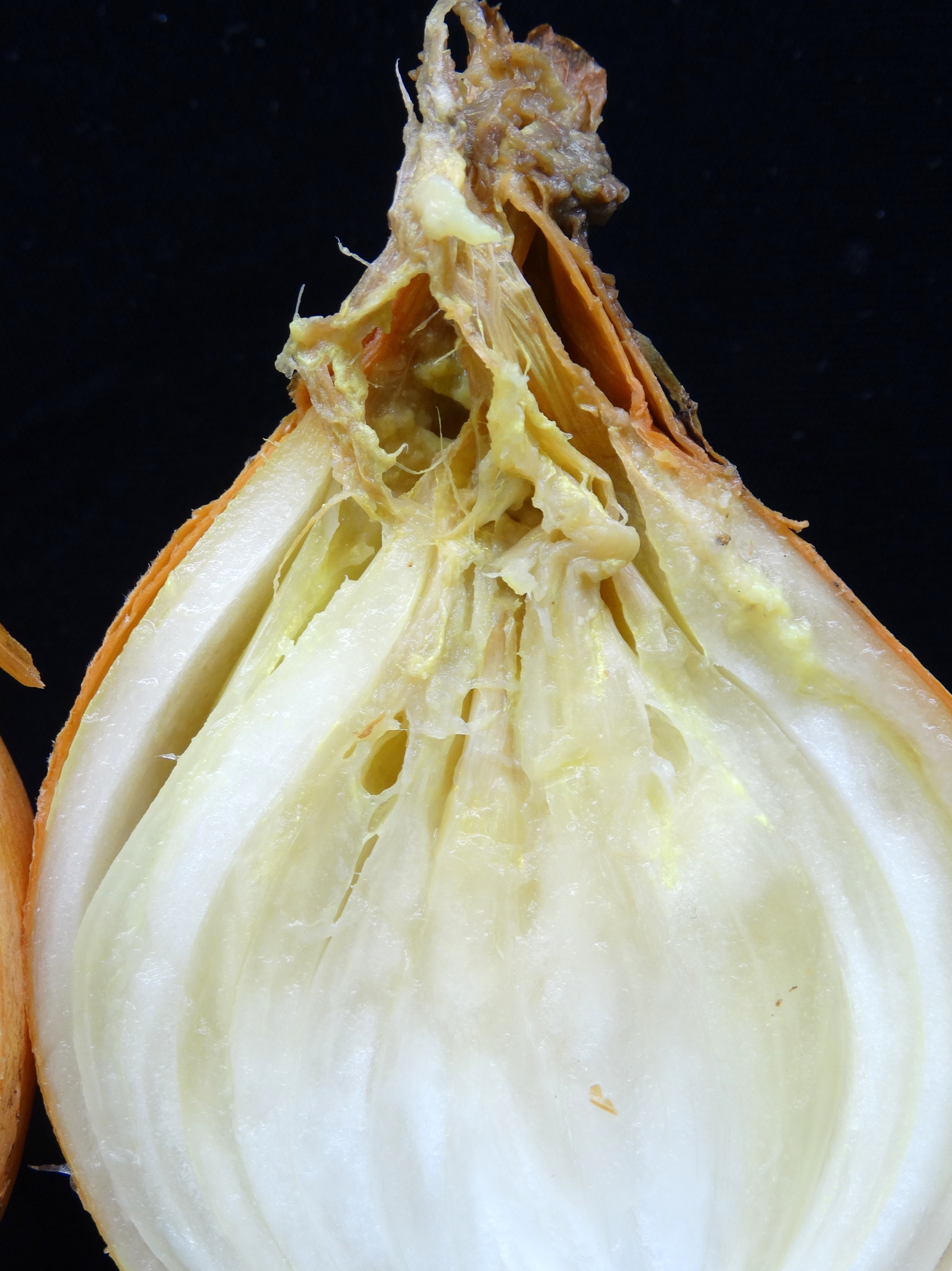
Bacterial soft rot caused by Erwinia carotovora subsp. carotovora

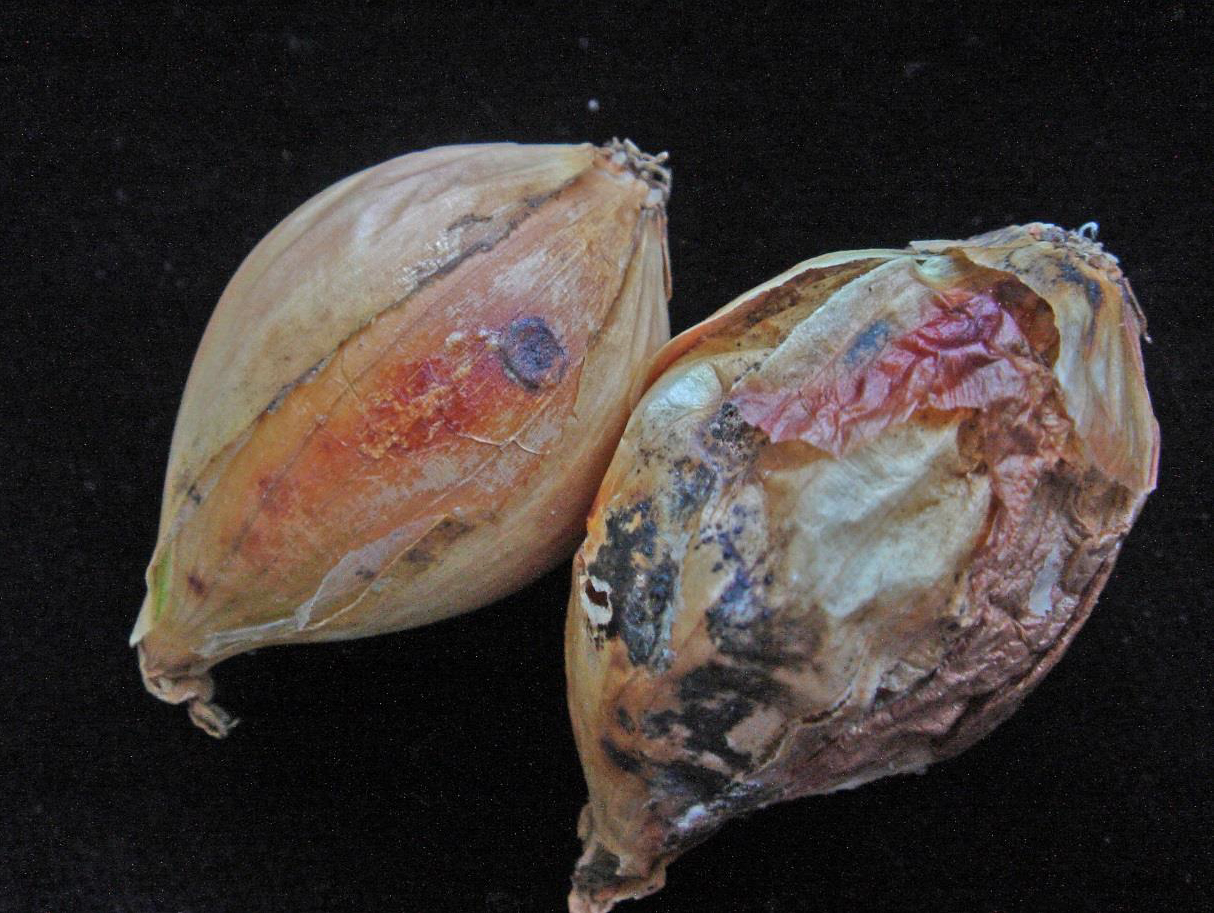
Anthracnose caused by Colletotrichum dematium subsp. circinans

Onion oil is authorised for use in the European Union for use as a pesticide against carrot fly in umbelliferous crops (carrots, parsnips, parsley, celery, celeriac).

=== Production ===
Production of onions and shallots (green) in 2022
China	864,488
Mali	610,576
Angola	558,480
Japan	510,462
World	4,970,615
Source: UN FAO

Onions are a widely cultivated vegetable crop, produced in the second largest quantity after tomatoes. In 2021, the top global producers of onions were China, India, the United States, and Turkey. In 2022, world production of onions and shallots (as green produce) was 5.0 million tonnes, led by China with 17% of the total, and Mali, Angola, and Japan as secondary producers.

Production of onions

Onion yield

Onion grading at the Centre for Agroecology, Water and Resilience, England, using a manually operated sorter

=== Storage ===
In the home, cooking onions and sweet onions are best stored at room temperature, optimally in a single layer, in large mesh bags in a dry, cool, dark, well-ventilated location. In this environment, cooking onions have a shelf life of three to four weeks and sweet onions one to two weeks. Cooking onions will absorb odours from apples and pears. Additionally, they draw moisture from vegetables with which they are stored which may cause them to decay.

Sweet onions have a greater water and sugar content than cooking onions. This makes them sweeter and milder tasting, but reduces their shelf life. Sweet onions can be stored refrigerated; they have a shelf life of around one month. Irrespective of type, any cut pieces of onion are best tightly wrapped, stored away from other produce, and used within two to three days.

== Varieties ==
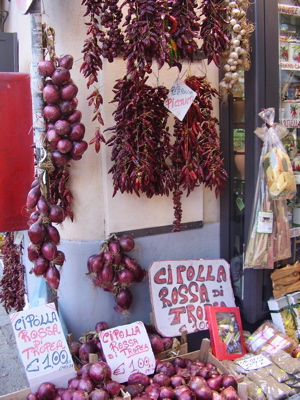
Rossa di Tropea onions for sale in Italy

=== Common onion group (var. cepa) ===
Most of the diversity within A. cepa occurs within this group, the most economically important Allium crop. Plants within this group form large single bulbs, and are grown from seed or seed-grown sets. The majority of cultivated varieties grown for dry bulbs, salad onions, and pickling onions belong to this group. The range of diversity found among these cultivars includes variation in photoperiod (length of day that triggers bulbing), storage life, flavour, and skin colour.

=== Aggregatum group (var. aggregatum) ===
This group contains shallots and potato onions, also referred to as multiplier onions. The bulbs are smaller than those of common onions, and a single plant forms an aggregate cluster of several bulbs from a master. They are propagated almost exclusively from daughter bulbs, although reproduction from seed is possible. Shallots are the most important subgroup within this group and comprise the only cultivars cultivated commercially. They form aggregate clusters of small, narrowly ovoid to pear-shaped bulbs. Potato onions differ from shallots in forming larger bulbs with fewer bulbs per cluster, and having a flattened (onion-like) shape. Intermediate forms exist.

I'itoi onion is a prolific multiplier onion cultivated in the Baboquivari Peak Wilderness, Arizona, area. This small-bulb type has a shallot-like flavour and is easy to grow and ideal for hot, dry climates. Bulbs are separated, and planted in the fall 25 mm (1 in) below the surface and 300 mm (12 in) apart. Bulbs will multiply into clumps and can be harvested throughout the cooler months. Tops die back in the heat of summer and may return with heavy rains; bulbs can remain in the ground or be harvested and stored in a cool dry place for planting in the fall. The plants rarely flower; propagation is by division.

==== Hybrids with A. cepa parentage ====
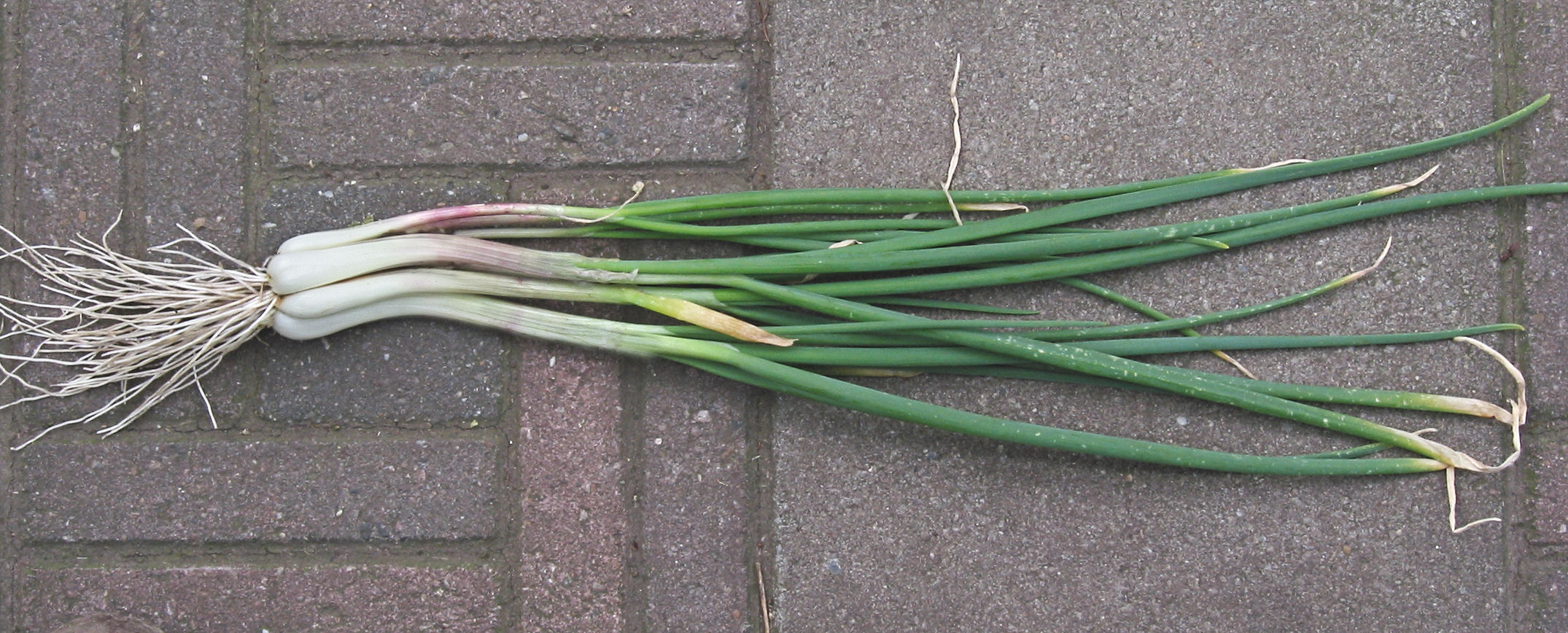
The tree or Egyptian onion is a hybrid of A. cepa and A. fistulosum.

Some hybrids are cultivated that have A. cepa parentage, such as the diploid tree onion or Egyptian onion (A. ×proliferum), and the triploid onion (A. ×cornutum).

The tree onion or Egyptian onion produces bulblets in the umbel instead of flowers, and is now known to be a hybrid of A. cepa and A. fistulosum. It has previously been treated as a variety of A. cepa, for example A. cepa var. proliferum, A. cepa var. bulbiferum, and A. cepa var. viviparum. It has been grown for centuries in Japan and China for use as a salad onion.

The triploid onion is a hybrid species with three sets of chromosomes, two sets from A. cepa and the third set from an unknown parent. Various clones of the triploid onion are grown locally in different regions, such as 'Ljutika' in Croatia, and 'Pran', 'Poonch', and 'Srinagar' in the India-Kashmir region. 'Pran' is grown extensively in the northern Indian provinces of Jammu and Kashmir. There are very small genetic differences between 'Pran' and the Croatian clone 'Ljutika', implying a monophyletic origin for this species.

Spring onions or salad onions may be grown from the Welsh onion (A. fistulosum), as well as from A. cepa. Young plants of A. fistulosum and A. cepa look very similar, but may be distinguished by their leaves, which are circular in cross-section in A. fistulosum rather than flattened on one side.

== In popular culture ==
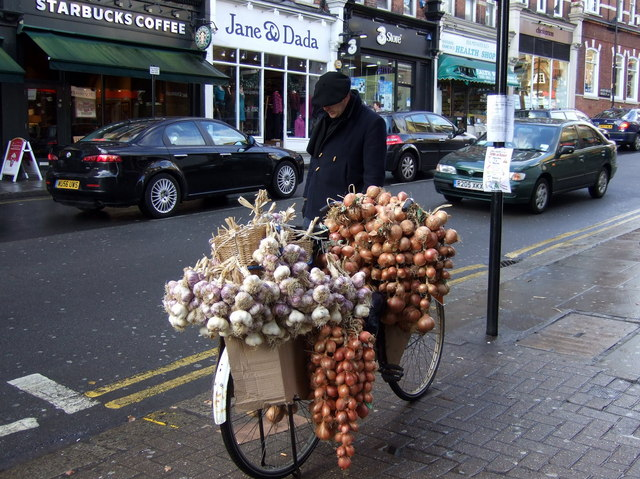
An Onion Johnny, his bicycle laden with onions and garlic, in London, 2008

An onion in the beak of a crane on the coat of arms of Tervola, Finland

Onion Johnnies were Breton farmers and agricultural labourers who travelled from Roscoff in Brittany, originally on foot and later on bicycles, selling strings of distinctive pink onions door to door in Britain. The name "the Big Onion" was formerly used of New York City, before it became "the Big Apple", and Chicago became "the Big Onion". The Chicago public radio station WBEZ named a series about the city's geography The Big Onion; it was explained that the nickname derived from the native American name for the city, which means a type of wild onion. (Note: The name Chicago is derived from a French rendering of the indigenous Miami–Illinois name Šikaakonki, the locative form of the word šikaakwa which can mean both "skunk" and "ramps", the wild onion Allium tricoccum.)

The 10th century Exeter Book, written in Old English, contains a riddle which seems to be about an onion, with sexual overtones. The "wondrous creature, a joy to women" stands "in a bed"; "My column is erect and tall"; a woman "rubs me to redness" but at once "she feels my meeting"; the riddle ends "Wet will be that eye."

In the Odyssey, Homer included the lines "I saw the shining tunic about his skin, like the skin of a dried onion, so soft was it, and it shone in the sun". R. Drew Griffith comments that the double comparison of the tunic that Penelope gave to the disguised Odysseus to onion and sun "risks being funny", and notes that Theopompus indeed found it "ridiculous". Griffith suggests that Homer included the onion because of its capacity to produce tears, hinting at Penelope's sorrow at Odysseus's long absence.

In India, when the price of onions became very high in 2015, the Hindustan Times recorded that people shared many onion jokes, such as the punning प्या (र)ज़ लो, प्याज़ दो (pya (r)z lo, pyaz do, "take love, give me onions").

== See also ==
- List of Allium species
- List of onion dishes
- Pyruvate scale

== Sources ==
- Fritsch, Reinhard M.; Friesen, Nikolai (2002). "Chapter 1: Evolution, Domestication, and Taxonomy". In Rabinowitch, Haim D.; Currah, Lesley (eds.). Allium Crop Science: Recent Advances. Wallingford, UK: CABI Publishing. doi:10.1079/9780851995106.0005. ISBN 0-85199-510-1. OCLC 228168061. S2CID 189956991.
