= Kurdish cuisine =

Culinary traditions of the Kurdish people

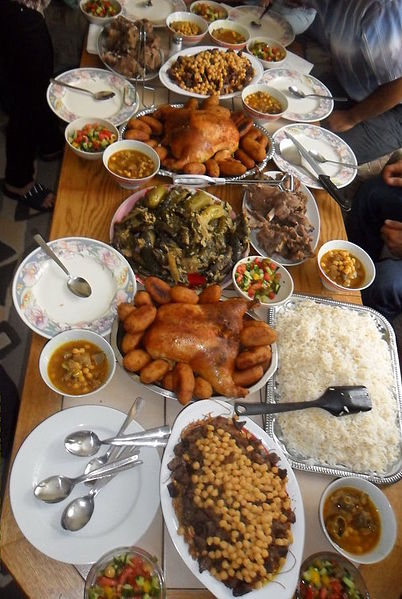
Various Kurdish dishes

Kurdish cuisine (Note: Sorani Kurdish: چێشتی کوردی, romanized: çêştî Kurdî; Kurmanji Kurdish: پێژگەها کوردی, romanized: pêjgeha Kurdî) consists of a wide variety of foods prepared by the Kurdish people. There are culinary and cultural similarities of Kurds and their neighbours in Iran, Iraq, Syria, Greece, Armenia and Turkey.

== Culinary customs ==
Kurdish cuisine makes abundant use of fresh herbs and spices.

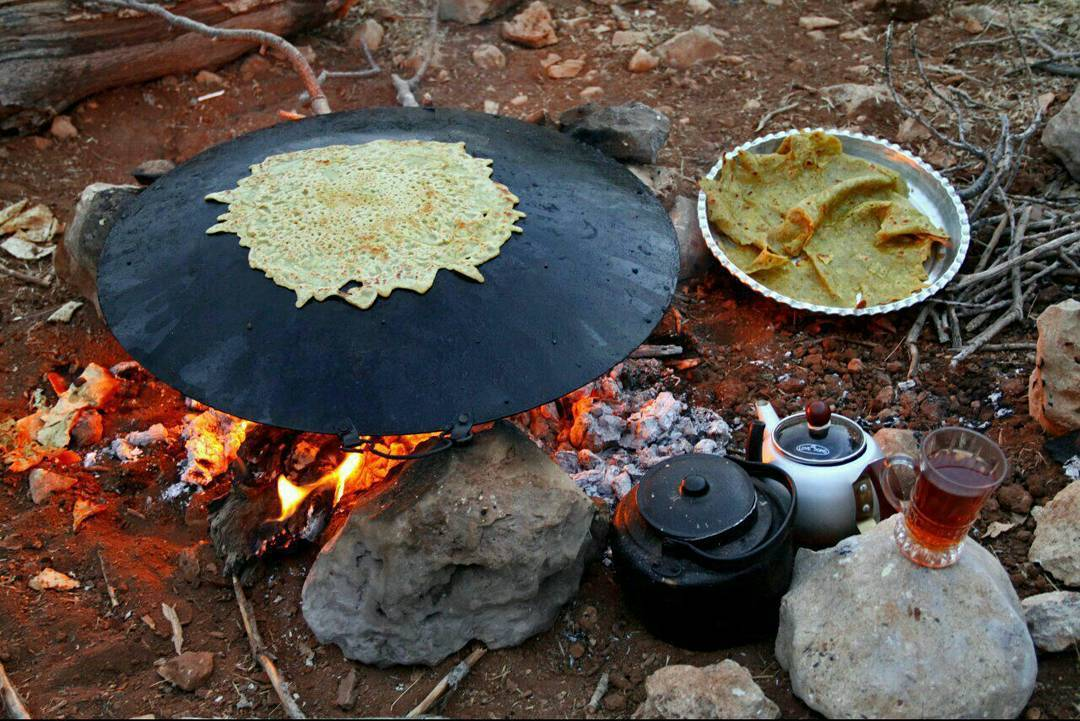
Traditional Kurdish bread, a crusty white loaf that is baked on a round hot iron, Hawraman

Sweetened black tea is a very common drink, along with bitter strong coffee. Another favourite Kurdish drink is Mastaw (ماستاو) or Ava Mast, which is yogurt and salt mixed with water. The fermented version of this is called Dô (Doogh).

Staples of Kurdish cuisine are Berbesel, Biryanî (بریانی), Dokliw (دۆکوڵیو), Kelane (کەلانە), Kulerenaske (ناسکە کولێرە), Kube (کوبە), Parêv, Tobûlî, Kuki (meat or vegetable pies), Birinç (white rice (برنج) alone or with meat or vegetables and herbs), and a variety of salads, pastries (شیرینی), and drinks specific to different parts of Kurdistan. Other popular dishes are Makluba (مەقلوبە), kofta (کوفتە), shifta (شفتە), shilah/maraga, spinach with eggs, wheat & lentil soup (شۆربای گەنم و عەدەس), beet & meat soup, sweet turnip, cardamon cookies, bulgur pilaf, mehîr, hûr û rûvî, pel (yaprakh) (یاپراخ), chichma (this dish is common in Erbil (Hewlêr)), tefti, niskene (نیسکێنە), and nane niskan.

Sawar (ساوەر), a traditional dish among Kurdish farmers, is made of wheat grain that is boiled, sun dried and pounded in a mortar (curn) to get rid of the husk. The wheat is then crushed in a mill (destarr). The resulting grain food can be boiled and served.

Tepsî (تەپسی) is a dish of aubergines, green peppers, courgettes and potatoes in a slightly spicy tomato sauce. Teşrîb (تشریب) consists of layers of naan in a sauce of green peppers, tomato, onions and chillies.

== Dishes and foods ==
=== Dairy products ===
Yoghurt, or mast in Kurdish, is considered the most popular fermented dairy product amongst Kurds. Doogh (or do in Kurdish) and kashk are two popular dairy products made from yogurt.

==== Cheeses ====
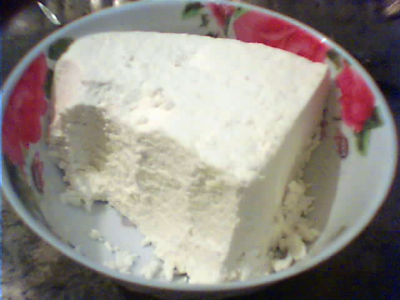
Lorik

The Kurdish people make many types of cheese using sheep, goat, or cow milk. The traditional cheeses made by Kurdish people are the following:

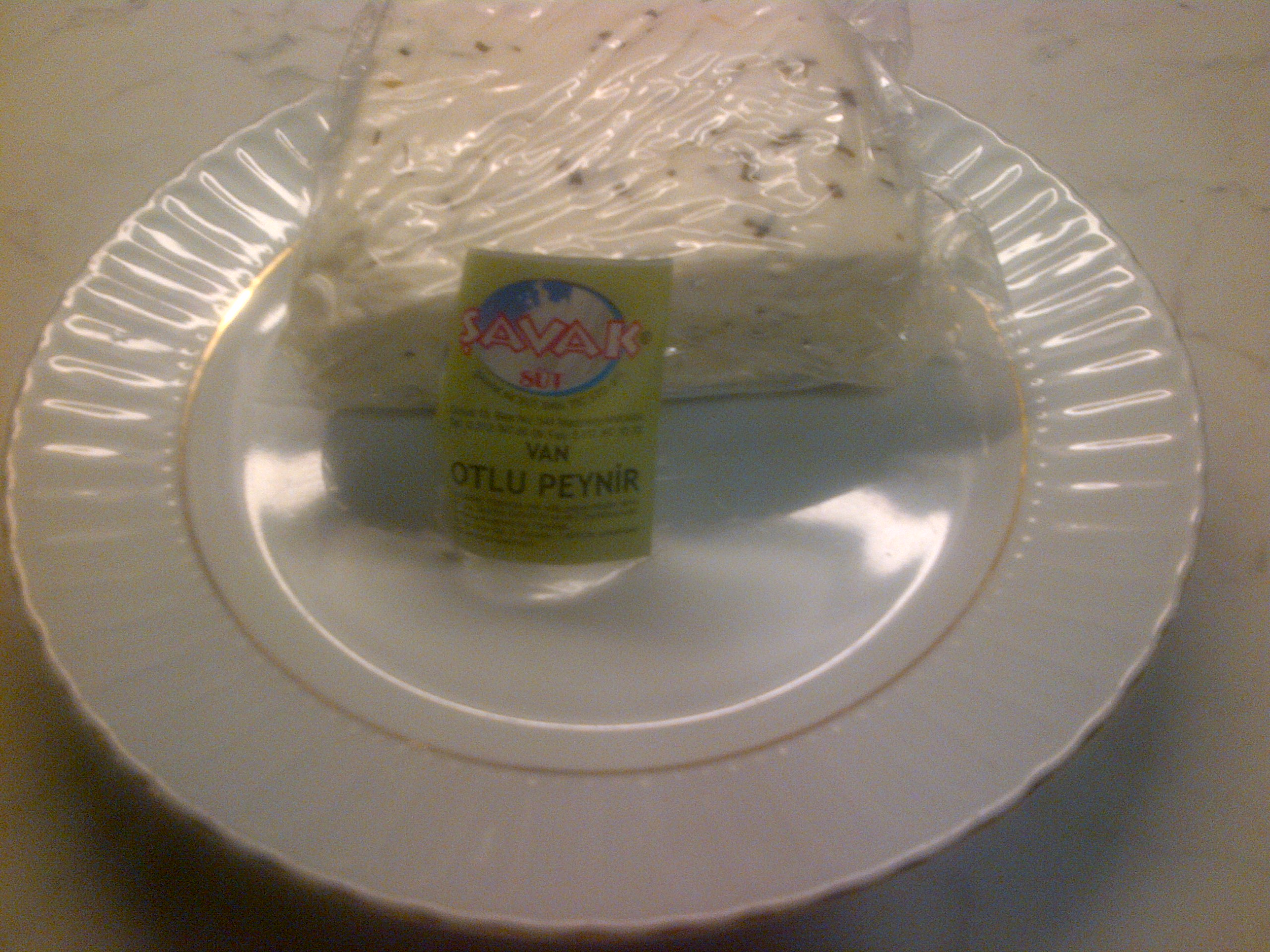
An image of Jajî, also known as Van herbed cheese

- Lorik — a traditional Kurdish whey cheese that is made by reheating whey that is left over after cheese production. The cheese has a soft texture and is commonly eaten fresh, especially during spring and summer. Before refrigerators existed, lorik was mixed with wild mountain herbs and stored in containers for consumption during the colder seasons. This preserved form was called Lorik u Giya (meaning “Lorik with herbs”) and is still popular in Kurdistan today.
- Jajî (Van herbed cheese) — sometimes known as Penîre Giyayî, is a Kurdish herbed cheese made from raw sheep’s milk and mixed with many varieties of mountain herbs, giving it an aromatic flavor. The cheese is produced at the villages of Van Province by Kurdish women who gather the herbs by hand each spring. The cheese, however, is marketed and sold by the Turkish name Van Otlu Peyniri (meaning Van herbed cheese) and the Kurdish name jajî is almost never used. However, Kurdish people living in Iraq also eat and make the cheese, and do use the term jajî to refer to it specifically.

=== Rice dishes ===
- Perde pelav
- Biryanî
- Birinca sor (red rice)
- Birinc bi maş (mung beans and rice)

=== Bread ===
In Kurdistan, bread can be found in various forms. Their ingredients differ as well as their shapes, densities, and textures.

=== Stuffed vegetables ===
Stuffed vegetables are widely known as pelpêç or îprax (sarma) or pel (dolma) in Kurdish regions.

- Pel (dolma)
- Pelpêç or îprax (yaprak or sarma)

=== Meat ===
As nomads and herders, lamb and chicken have been the main dishes of Kurdish cuisine for centuries. Dishes with meat involved include:

- Kutilk, also used in the following stews:
  - Tirşik
  - Kutildewk
  - Avşirînk
- Putête çap
- Kebab
- Qelî, Kurdish stir-fry
- Meqlûbî
- Skewered meat (i.e. chicken, mutton, beef, etc.)

=== Dessert ===
- Gilûl, cooked yoghurt and rice topped with a layer of date molasses
- Xebîse, brown cookies unique to the city of Amedi
- Kade, ceremonial cookies usually with a date, walnut, or coconut filling
- Arxavk, a paste made from flour and water which can be done savory or sweet
  - Kurds also use arxavk as a kade filling
- Apple salad (chopped apples in mayonnaise) is a popular appetizer in Kurdish cuisine
- Peqlave

=== Non-alcoholic beverages ===
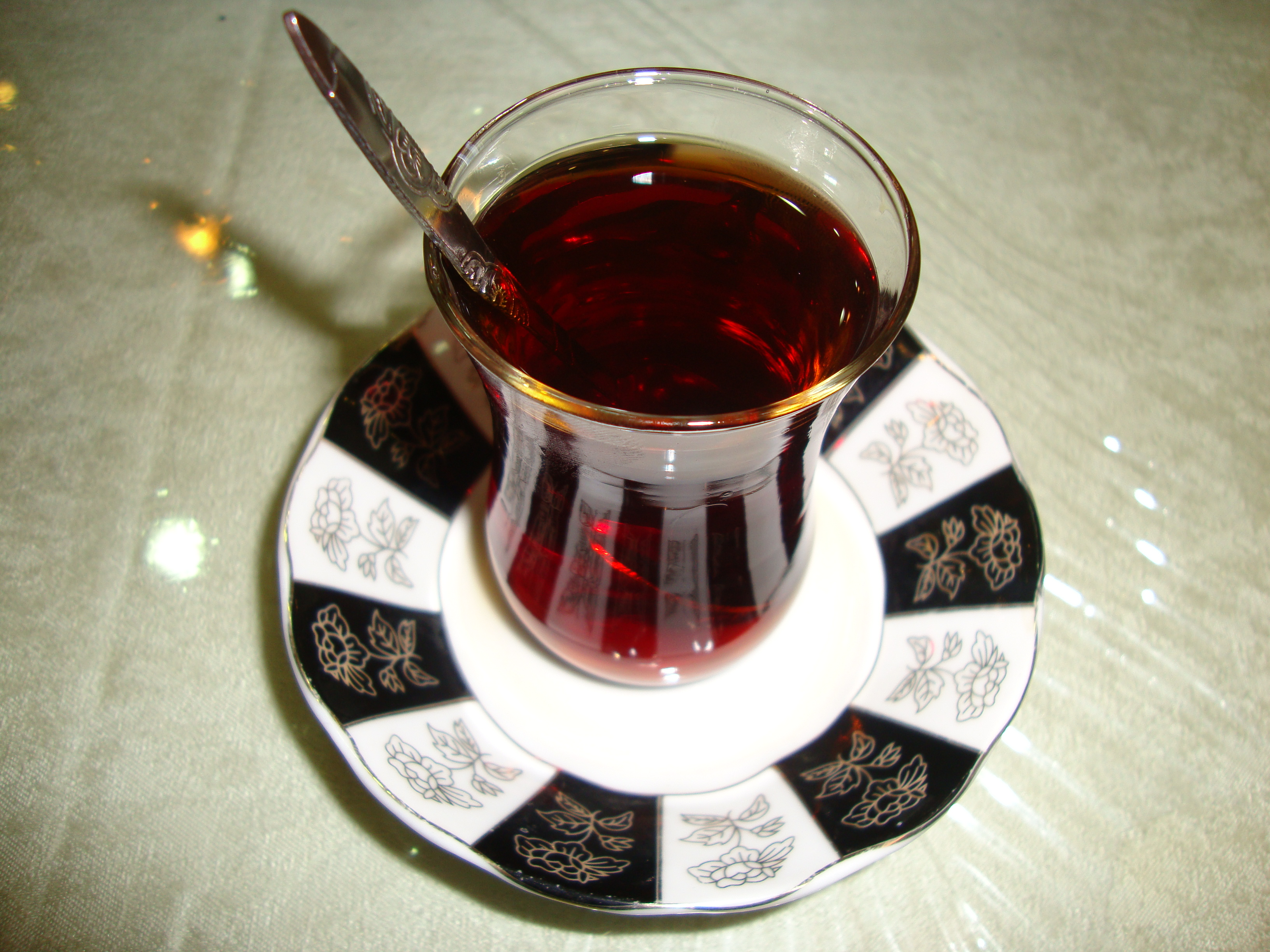
Kurdish traditional teacup

- Kurdish coffee, also known as terebinth coffee (Qehweya kezwanê or Kafêya Kurdî)
- Çay
- Dew or do
  - Also used in stews such as kutildewk
- Avamast or mastaw
- Raisin juice
- Xoşav, or compote

== Related cuisines ==
- Afghan cuisine
- Albanian cuisine
- Arab cuisine
- Armenian cuisine
- Assyrian cuisine
- Azerbaijani cuisine
- Balkan cuisine
- Balochi cuisine
- Bosnian cuisine
- Bulgarian cuisine
- Caucasian cuisine
- Central Asian cuisine
- Cypriot cuisine
- Georgian cuisine
- Greek cuisine
- Iranian cuisine
- Levantine cuisine
- Mediterranean cuisine
- Mesopotamian cuisine
- Middle Eastern cuisine
- North Indian cuisine
- Ottoman cuisine
- Pakistani cuisine
- Tajik cuisine
- Turkish cuisine
- Turkmen cuisine
- Uzbek cuisine

== See also ==
- Kurdish coffee, a hot drink made from terebinth

== Bibliography ==
- Barzinji, Ala, Traditional Kurdish Food: An insight into Kurdish culinary heritage, 2015, ISBN 1784624144.
- Sinjari, Emel, The Kurdish Cookbook, 2016, ASIN B01LZ0DZ5I.
- Zebari, Chiman, My Life, My Food, My Kurdistan, 2015, ASIN B0793Q93R8.
- Nikolovski, Goce, Taste of Kurdish Cuisine: Part 1, 2016, ASIN B01LXXAEUQ.
