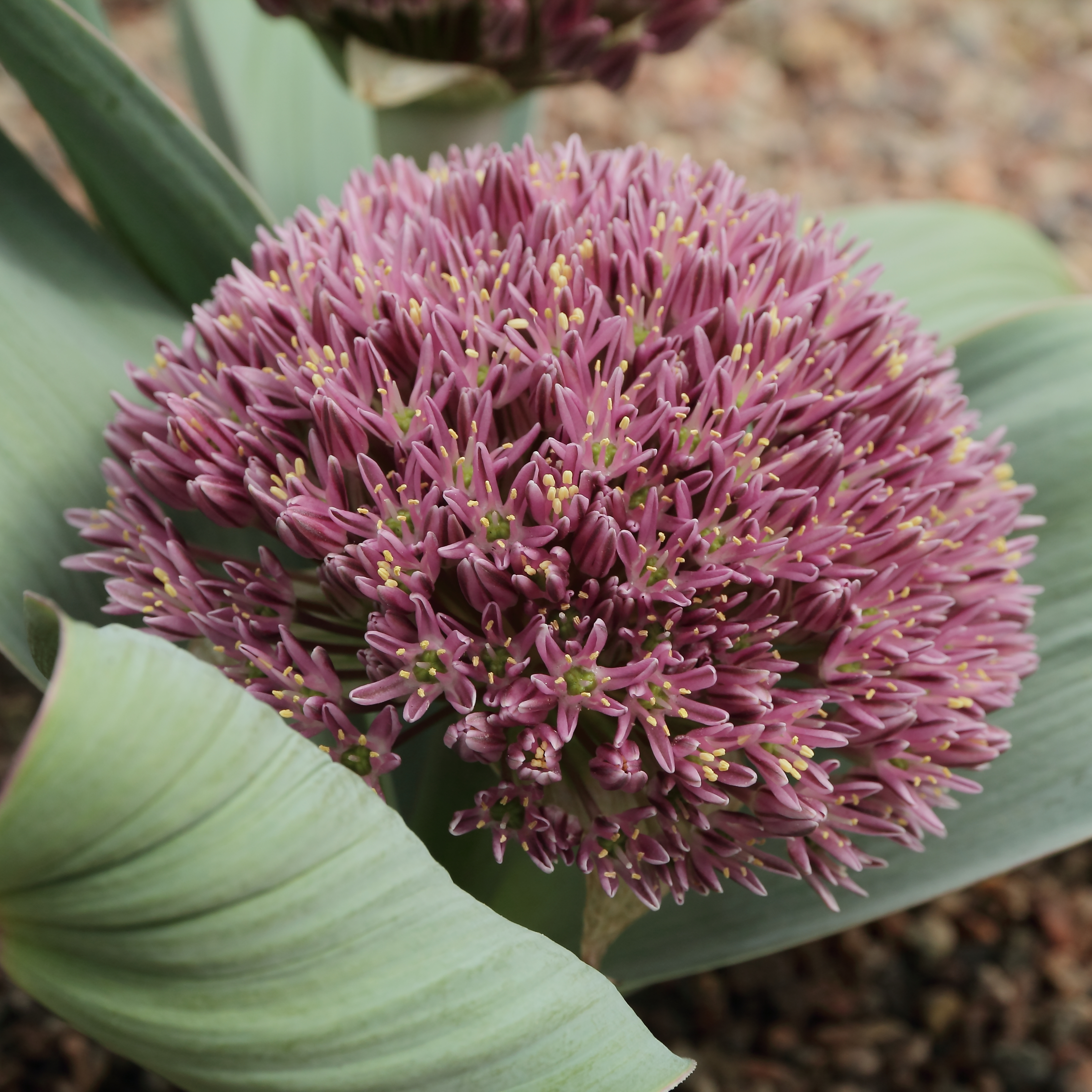

Scientific classification
- Kingdom: Plantae
- Clade: Tracheophytes
- Clade: Angiosperms
- Clade: Monocots
- Order: Asparagales
- Family: Amaryllidaceae
- Subfamily: Allioideae
- Genus: Allium
- Subgenus: Allium subg. Melanocrommyum
- Species: A. akaka

Binomial name
- Allium akaka S.G.Gmel. ex Schult. & Schult.f. 1830 not Regel 1875

= Allium akaka =

Species of flowering plant

Allium akaka is a species of onion native to Iran.

formerly included

Several infraspecific names have been coined referring to taxa now generally considered distinct species not to be included in Allium akaka. We give links here to help you locate appropriate information

- Allium akaka subsp. haemanthoides (Boiss. & Reut. ex Regel) Wendelbo, now synonym of Allium haemanthoides Boiss. & Reut. ex Regel
- Allium akaka f. major Turrill, now synonym of Allium ubipetrense R.M.Fritsch
- Allium akaka var. regale Tamamsch, now synonym of Allium materculae Bordz.
- Allium akaka subsp. shelkovnikovii (Grossh.) Wendelbo, now synonym of Allium shelkovnikovii Grossh.
