= Van herbed cheese =

Turkish sheep or cow cheese

- Country of origin: Turkey
- Region: Van Province
- Source of milk: Cows, sheep, goats
- Texture: semi-hard

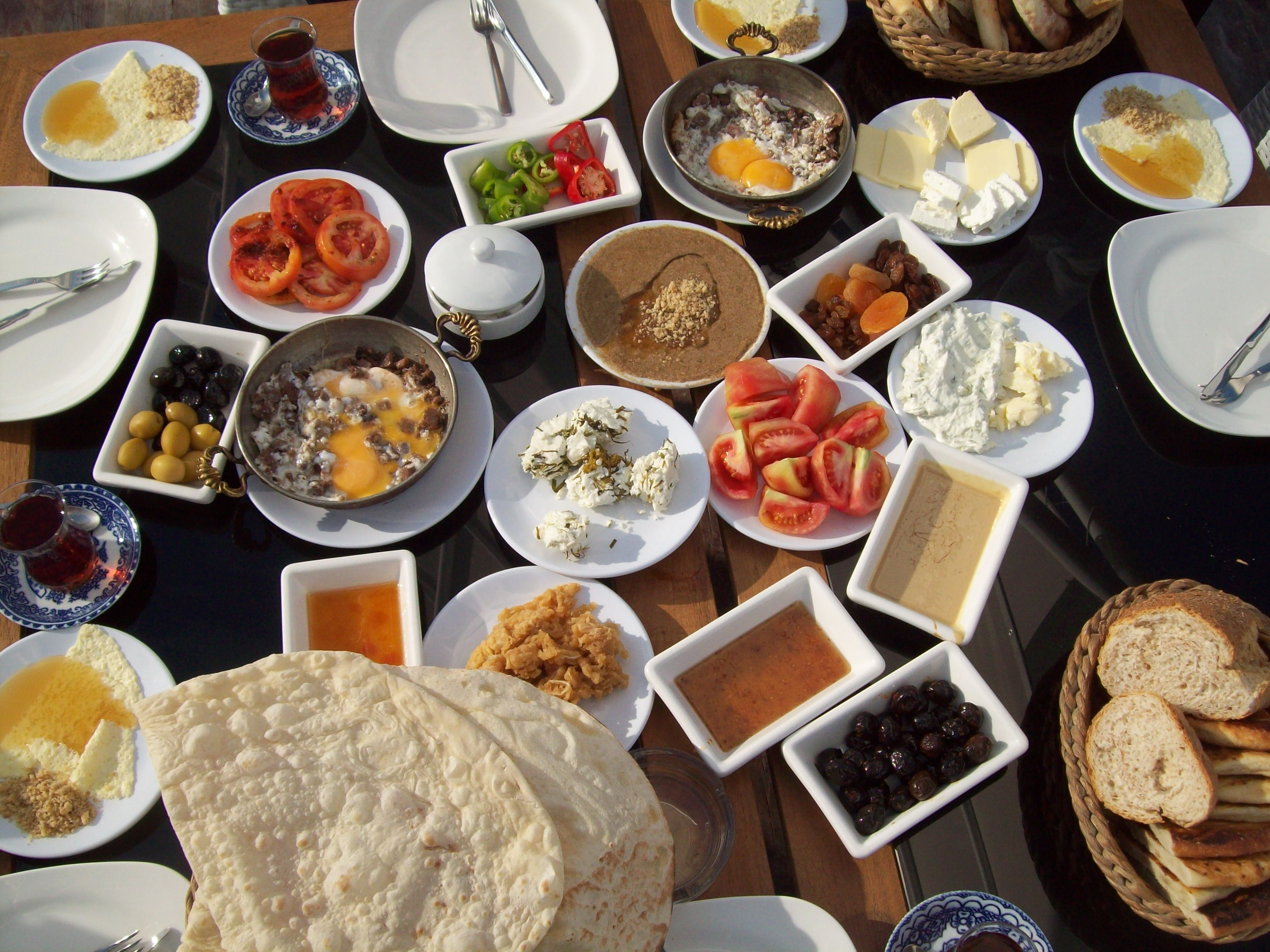
Van breakfast

Van herbed cheese (Turkish: Van otlu peyniri, Kurmanji Kurdish: Jajî); is a type of cheese traditionally made from raw sheep milk, though cow and goat milk may be used or added. It is semi-hard in texture, and is produced primarily in the Kurdish-inhabited villages in the Van Province of Turkey.

Eastern Turkey has a centuries-long history of producing ripened, herbed cheeses. They are typically semi-hard, and have a salty taste alongside the herb aroma. Herbs typically used in these cheeses include alliums, thyme, Silene vulgaris, and Chaerophyllum, among others. Traditionally, cheesemakers making this cheese use rennet to coagulate raw sheep's milk, then mix the herbs in with the curds to drain and be pressed. The cheese is then brined, and matures underground for 2–3 months. The herbs used in the cheese have antibiotic properties, and therefore increase the cheese's shelf-life.

Otlu, produced mainly in the Van Province of Turkey, is perhaps the most popular of these cheeses. Traditionally, it is made in small dairies and villages, however, as the cheese has grown in popularity, it has seen increased production in larger cities across Turkey.

== Herbs used ==
- Ranunculus polyanthemos L. (Ranunculaceae)
- Nasturtium officinale R. Br. (Brassicaceae)
- Gypsophila L. spp. (Caryophyllaceae)
- Silene vulgaris (Maench) Garcke var. vulgaris (Caryophyllaceae)
- Anthriscus nemorosa (Bieb.) Sprengel (Apiaceae)
- Carum carvi L. (Apiaceae)
- Anethum graveolens L. (Apiaceae)
- Prangos pabularia Lindl. (Apiaceae)
- Prangos ferulacea (L.) Lind. (Apiaceae)
- Ferula L. sp. (Apiaceae)
- Ferula orientalis L. (Apiaceae)
- Ferula rigidula DC. (Apiaceae)
- Thymus kotschyanus Boiss. et Hohen. var. glabrescens Boiss. (Lamiaceae)
- Thymus migricus Klokov et Des. – Shoct. (Lamiaceae)
- Mentha spicata L. subsp. spicata (Lamiaceae)
- Ziziphora clinopodioides Lam. (Lamiaceae)
- Ocimum basilicum L. (Lamiaceae)
- Eremurus spectabilis Bieb. (Liliaceae)
- Allium schoenoprasum L. (Liliaceae)
- Allium fuscoviolaceum Fomin (Liliaceae)
- Allium scorodoprasum L. subsp. rotundum (L.) Stearn (Liliaceae)
- Allium aucheri Boiss. (Liliaceae)
- Allium paniculatum L. subsp. paniculatum (Liliaceae)
- Allium akaka S. G. Gmelin (Liliaceae)
- Allium cf. cardiostemon Fisch. et Mey. (Liliaceae)

== See also ==
- List of cheeses
