= Kurdish coffee =

Hot drink made from ground terebinth fruits

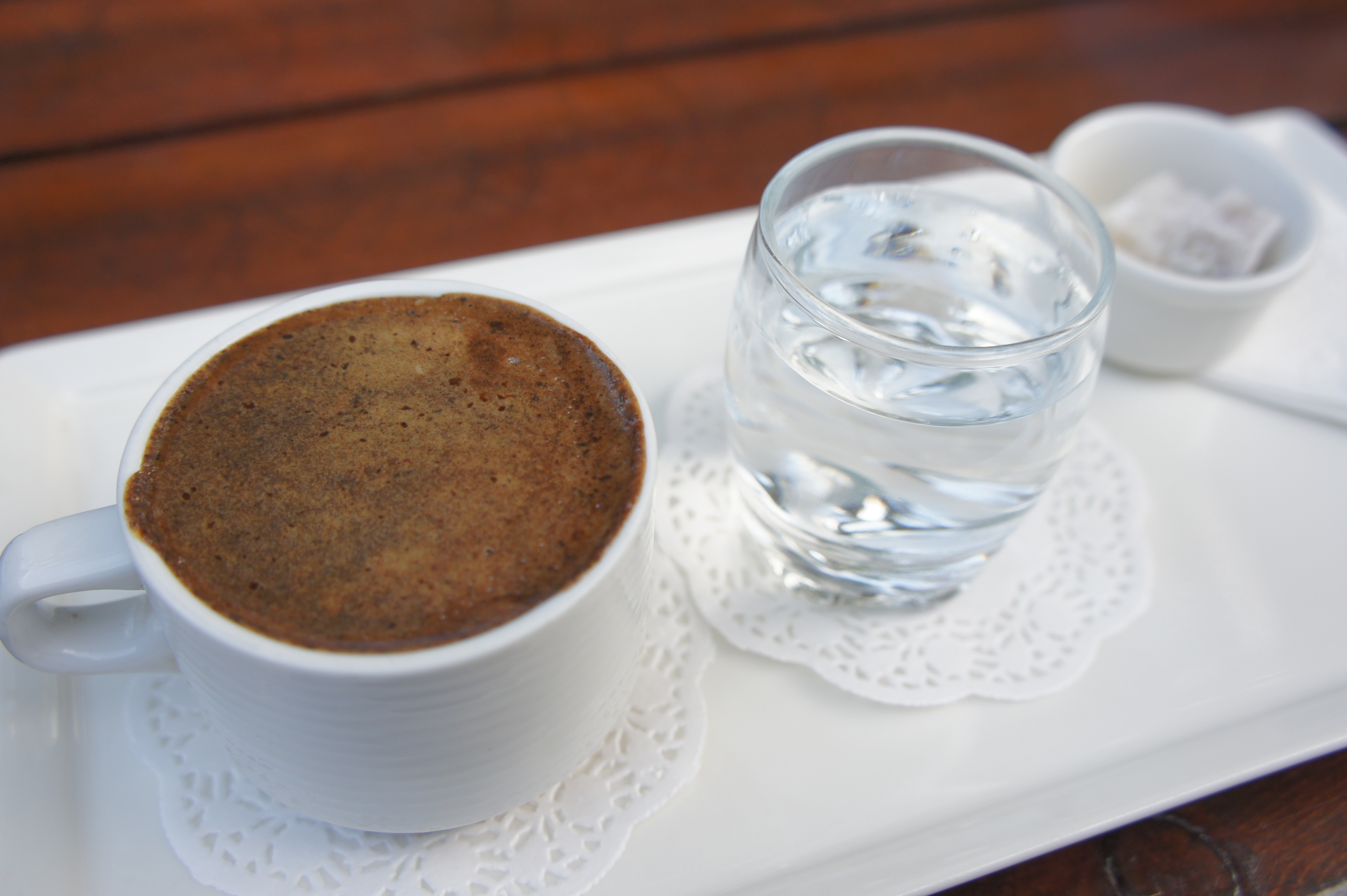
A coffee-like beverage made from the roasted fruit of the terebinth or "turpentine tree"

Kurdish coffee (Kurdish: (قاوەی کوردی) Qehweya Kurdî or Qehweya Kezwanan or qazwan in Iraqi Kurdistan) or menengiç coffee (Turkish: menengiç kahvesi), meaning pistachio coffee or terebinth coffee, is a traditional hot beverage in Kurdish and Turkish cuisine. It is made of ground roasted terebinth fruits (related to the pistachio) as the main ingredient, and is caffeine-free. It is particularly popular in parts of Southeastern Anatolia.

== History ==
The beverage has been produced in historically Kurdish areas including Diyarbakır, Adıyaman, Mardin, Batman and Gaziantep for over a hundred years, with the latter of whom it is considered a traditional specialty. also having obtained the geographical indication certificate for "Gaziantep Menengiç Coffee". It is considered a traditional speciality of Gaziantep where it is used as a home remedy for colds. The remains of wild pistachios have been found at the Neolithic site of Göbekli Tepe, two hours east of Gaziantep.

The roasted and ground berries have been exported to Europe and around the world since the early 20th century. Although it contains neither coffee beans nor caffeine, it is known as coffee because seeds of Menengiç are roasted and cooked like Turkish coffee.

In recent years, the processed berries in the form of an oily paste have appeared as a branded product in cans or jars.
