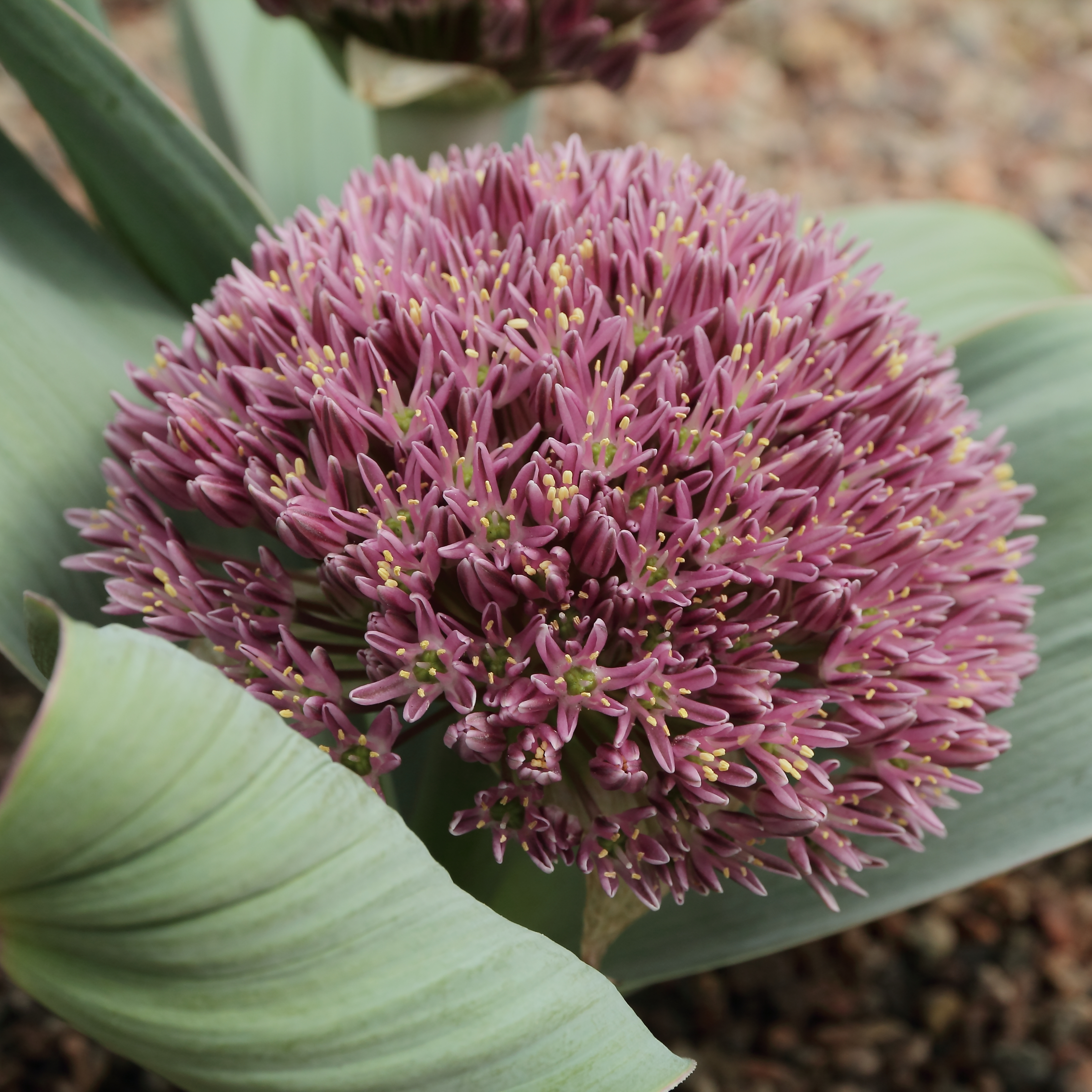

Scientific classification
- Kingdom: Plantae
- Clade: Tracheophytes
- Clade: Angiosperms
- Clade: Monocots
- Order: Asparagales
- Family: Amaryllidaceae
- Subfamily: Allioideae
- Genus: Allium
- Subgenus: Allium subg. Melanocrommyum
- Species: A. materculae

Binomial name
- Allium materculae Bordz, 1915

Synonyms
- Allium materculae var. albiflorum Bordz.; Allium akaka var. regale Tamamsch.

= Allium materculae =

Species of flowering plant

Allium materculae is a species of onion native to Turkey, Iran, and Russia.
