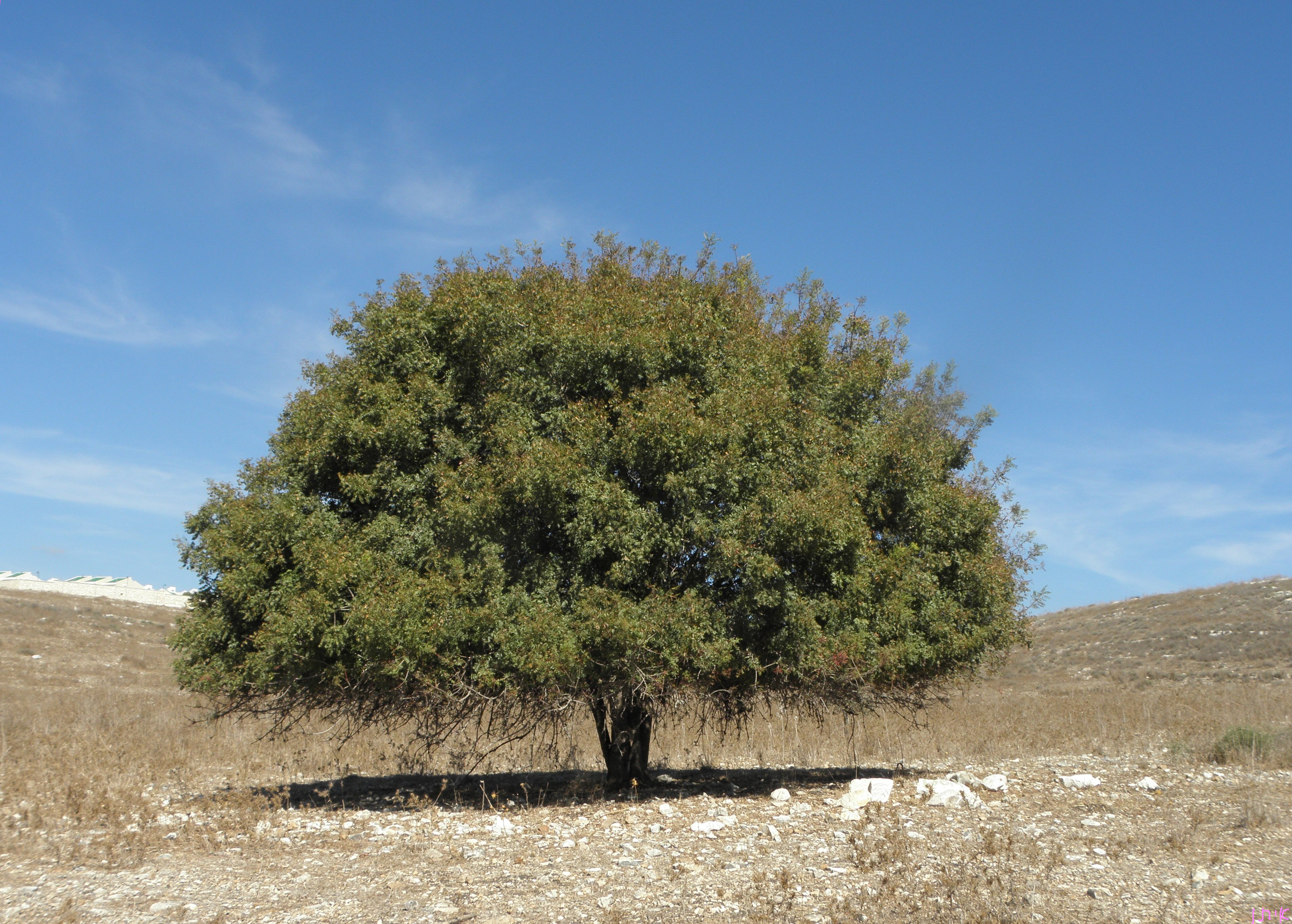

Scientific classification
- Kingdom: Plantae
- Clade: Tracheophytes
- Clade: Angiosperms
- Clade: Eudicots
- Clade: Rosids
- Order: Sapindales
- Family: Anacardiaceae
- Genus: Pistacia
- Species: P. terebinthus

Binomial name
- Pistacia terebinthus L.
- Distribution

Synonyms
- Lentiscus vulgaris Garsault nom. inval.; Pistacia terebinthina St.-Lag. [Spelling variant]; Terebinthus communis Dum.Cours.; Pistacia palaestina Boiss.; Terebinthus vulgaris Dum.Cours.

= Pistacia terebinthus =

Species of flowering plants in the sumac family

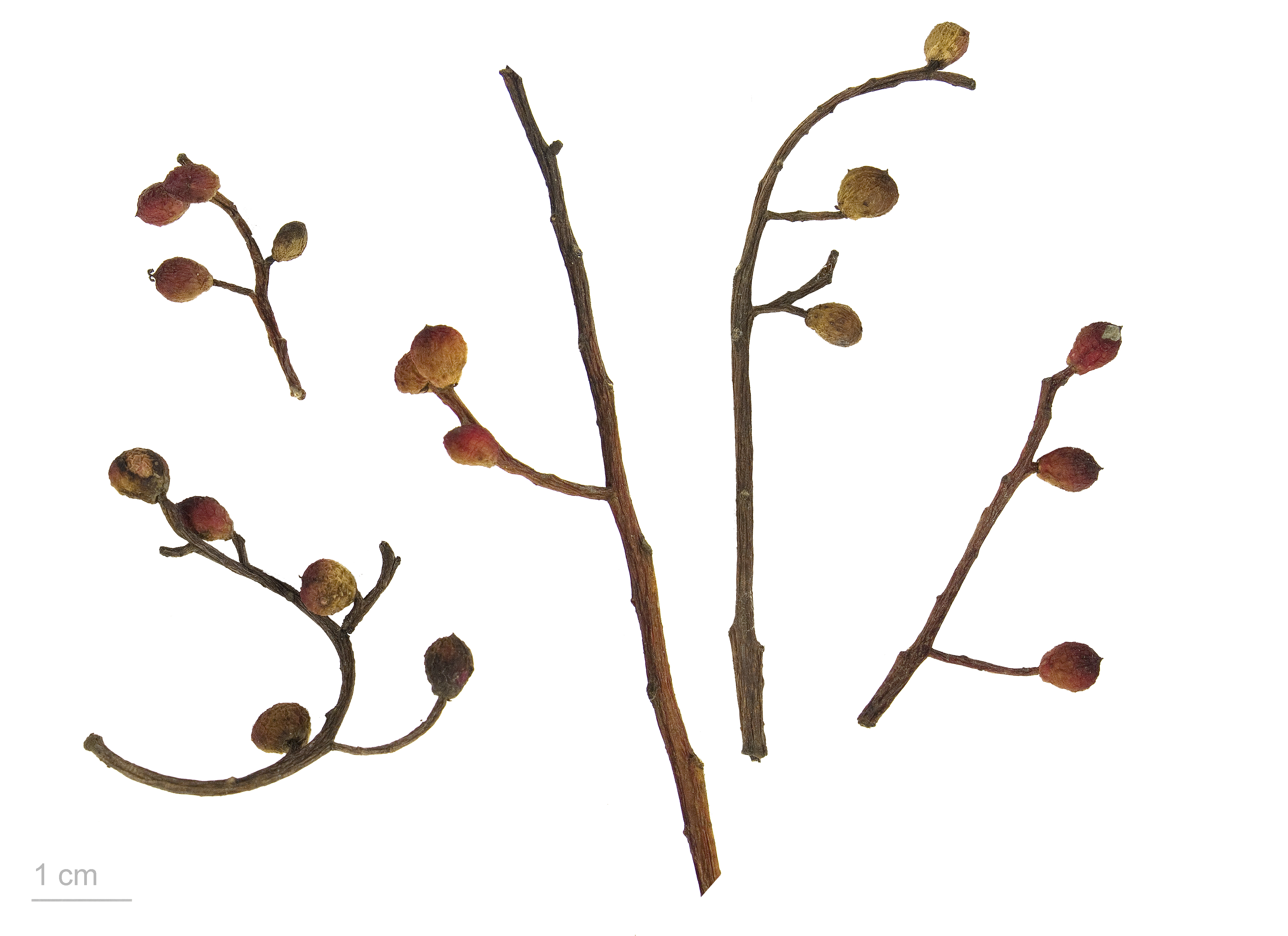
Dry fruit of Pistacia terebinthus (MHNT collection)

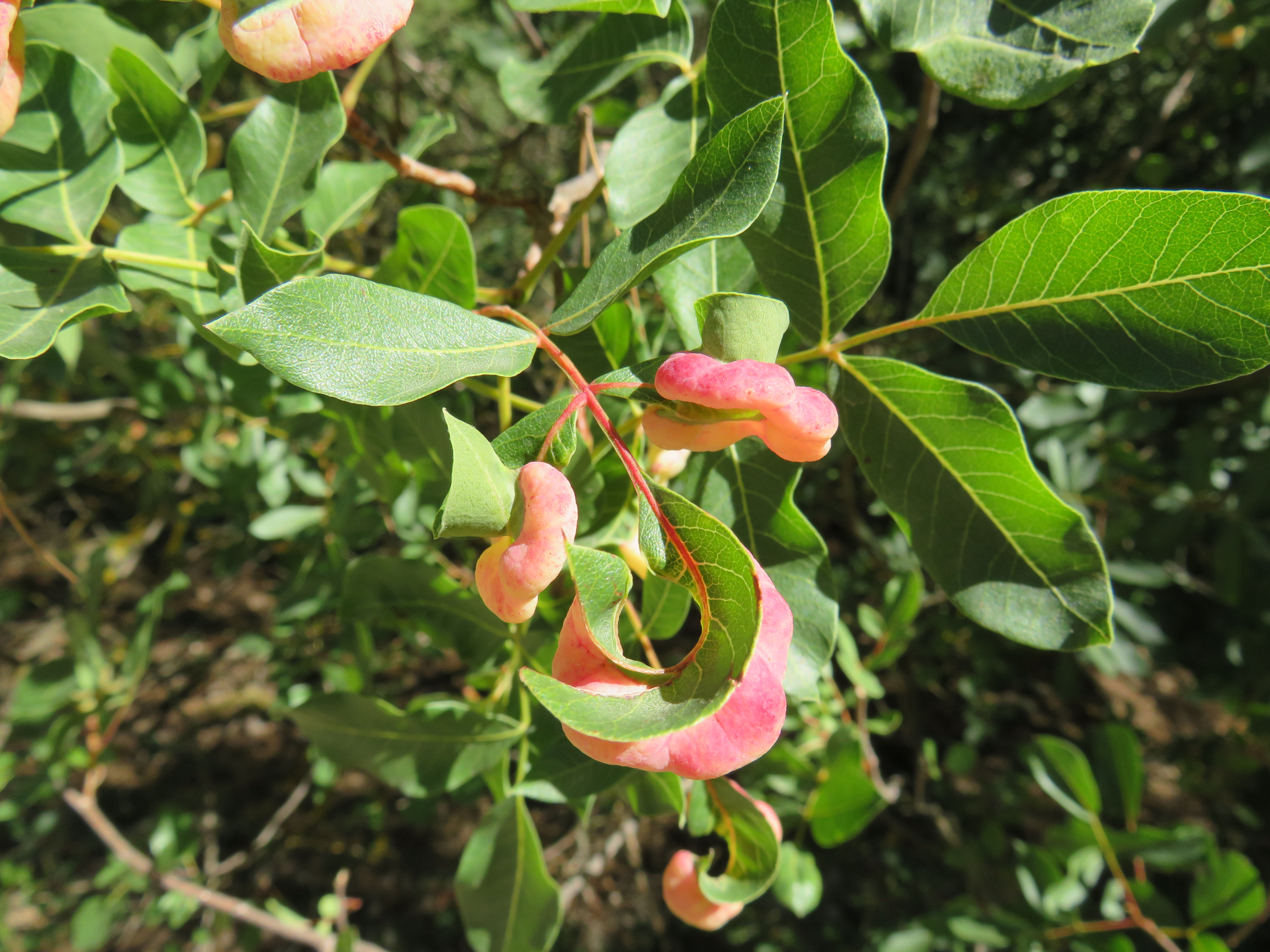
Aphid Forda formicaria galls on the leaflets

Pistacia terebinthus, also called the terebinth, /ˈtɛrəˌbɪnθ/ is a deciduous shrub species of the genus Pistacia, native to the Mediterranean region from the western regions of Morocco and Portugal to Greece and western and southeastern Turkey. At one time terebinths growing on the eastern shores of the Mediterranean Sea were regarded as a separate species, Pistacia palaestina, but these are now considered to be a synonym of P. terebinthus.

== Description ==
The terebinth is a deciduous flowering plant belonging to the cashew family, Anacardiaceae; a small tree or large shrub, it grows to 10 m (33 ft) tall. The leaves are compound, 10–20 cm (3.9–7.9 in) long, odd pinnate with five to eleven opposite glossy oval leaflets, the leaflets 2–6 cm (0.79–2.36 in) long and 1–3 cm (0.39–1.18 in) broad. The flowers are reddish-purple, appearing with the new leaves in early spring. All parts of the plant have a strong resinous smell. The edible fruit consists of small, globular drupes 5–7 mm (0.20–0.28 in) in diameter, red to black when ripe, with a peppercorn like structure.

The terebinth is a dioecious tree, i.e. it exists as male and female specimens. For a viable population both sexes must be present. The oblong leaf is bright green, leathery, with 10 cm (3.9 in) long or more with three to nine leaflets. Leaves alternate, leathery and compound paripinnate (no terminal leaflet) with three or six deep green leaflets. They are generally larger and rounder than the leaves of the mastic, reminiscent of the leaves of carob tree. The flowers range from purple to green, the fruit is the size of a pea and turns from red to brown, depending on the degree of maturation. The whole plant emits a strong smell: bitter, resinous, or medicinal. In the vegetative period they develop "galls" shaped like a goat's horn (from which the plant gets the name "cornicabra", the common name in Spanish), that occur on the leaves and leaflets which have been bitten by insects.

The species propagates by seeds and shoots. Although marred by the presence of galls, it is a very strong and resistant tree which survives in degraded areas where other species have been eliminated. Pistacia terebinthus is related to Pistacia lentiscus (mastic) with which it hybridizes frequently in contact zones. Pistacia terebinthus is more abundant in the mountains and inland and the mastic is usually found more frequently in areas where the Mediterranean influence of the sea moderates the climate. The mastic tree does not reach the size of the Pistacia terebinthus, but the hybrids are very difficult to distinguish. The mastic has winged stalks to its leaflets, i.e., the stalks are flattened and with side fins, whereas these stems in Pistacia terebinthus are simple. On the west coast of the Mediterranean, Canary Islands and Middle East, P. terebinthus can be confused with P. atlantica.

== Habitat ==
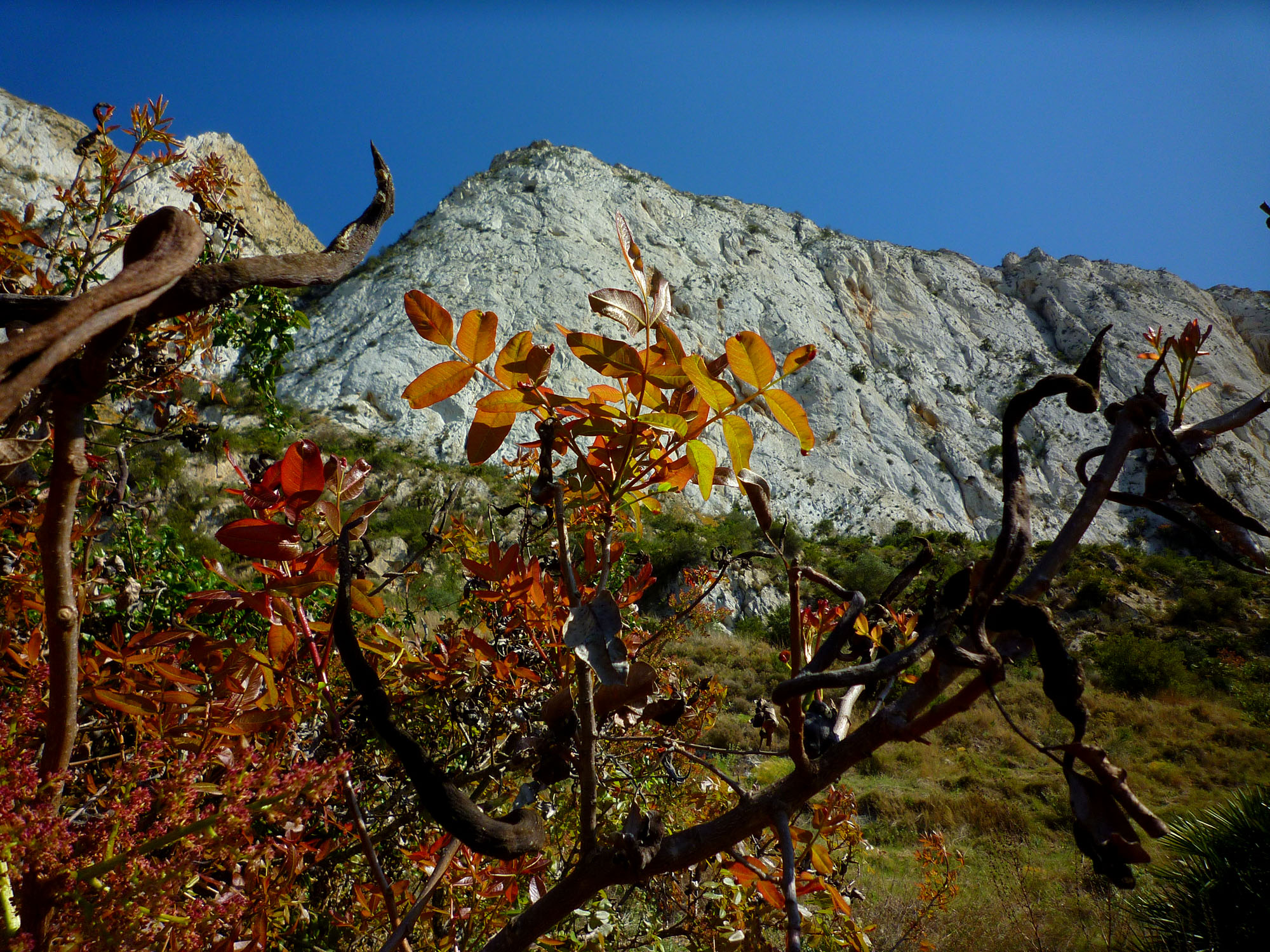
Pistacia terebinthus in Peñas Blancas, Cartagena, Spain

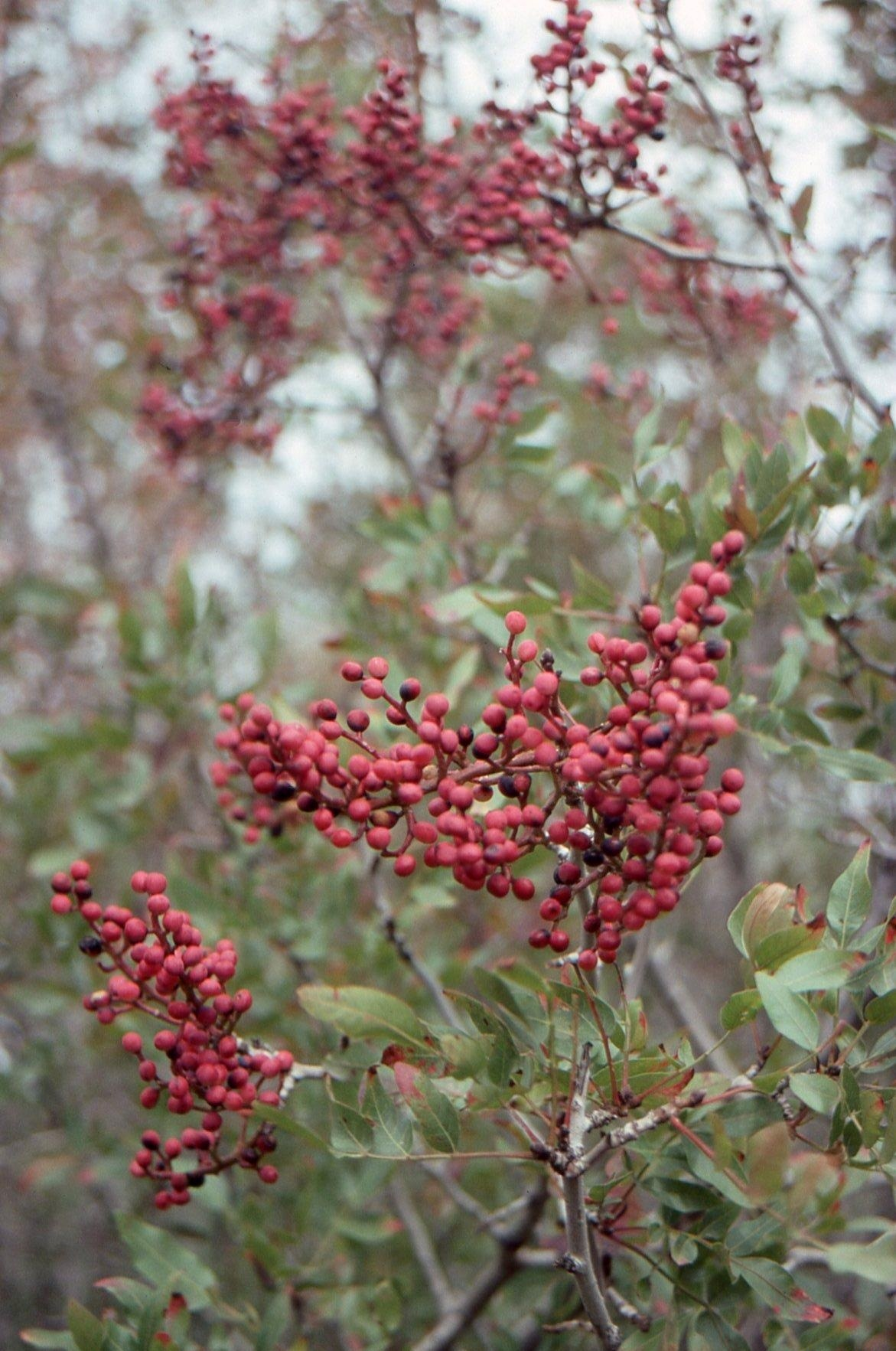
Pistacia terebinthus in Yenifoça, Turkey

The terebinth prefers relatively moist areas, up to 600 m (2,000 ft) in elevation. It tolerates more intense frost and summer drought than mastic can. The plant is common in the garrigue and maquis. It appears in deciduous oak wood. It has a gray trunk that is very aromatic, and may have multiple trunks or stems when grown as a shrub. Usually reaching 5 m (16 ft) in height, although in rare cases can reach 10 m (33 ft). P. terebinthus is one of the European species of Anacardiaceae, a family of about 600 mostly tropical species. It can be found to 1,500 m (4,900 ft) above sea level. P. terebinthus is more moisture demanding than the mastic and more resistant to cold. It requires a sunny exposure and average soils, tolerating lime and some salt, often grows near the sea, deep ravines and near salt-lakes and streams.

== History ==
The historian John Chadwick believes that the terebinth is the plant called ki-ta-no in some of the Linear B tablets. He cites the work of scholar J. L. Melena, who had found "an ancient lexicon which showed that kritanos was another name for the turpentine tree, and that the Mycenaean spelling could represent a variant form of this word".

The Latin name is underlain by the Ancient Greek name τερέβινθος which, in turn, is underlain by a pre-Greek Pelasgian word, marked by the characteristic consonant complex νθ.

Terebinth from Oricum is referred to in Virgil's Aeneid, and by Robin Lane Fox in Alexander the Great. In the Hebrew Bible (or Old Testament) the Hebrew word elah (plural elot) is used, although the word is sometimes translated as 'oak'.

== Uses ==
The word "turpentine" was originally used for the exudate of terebinth trees (P. terebinthus and related species such as P. atlantica), now called Chian, Chios, or Cyprian turpentine, and it was later transferred to the crude turpentine (oleoresin) and the oil of turpentine (essential oil) of conifer trees. The word turpentine derives (via Old French and Latin) from the Greek word τερεβινθίνη (terebinthínē), the feminine form (to go with the feminine Greek word for resin) of an adjective τερεβίνθινος (terebínthinos), derived from the Greek noun τερέβινθος (terébinthos), the name for the terebinth tree. However, the main source of the terebinth turpentine is P. atlantica which produces abundant resin instead of P. terebinthus of which the amount of resin is limited.

In the Northern Sporades the shoots are used as a vegetable (called tsitsíravla). The plant is rich in tannins and resinous substances and was used for its aromatic and medicinal properties in classical Greece. A mild sweet scented gum can be produced from the bark, and galls often found on the plant are used for tanning leather. A triterpene has been extracted from these galls. In Turkey, it is known as menengiç or bıttım.

=== Fruits ===
The fruits are used in Cyprus for baking of a specialty village bread. In Crete, where the plant is called tsikoudia, it is used to flavor the local variety of pomace brandy, also called tsikoudia. A coffee-like beverage, Kurdish coffee or menengiç kahvesi, is made from the roasted fruit, and a soap is made from the oil. Terebinth resin was used as a wine preservative in the entire ancient Near East, as proven by many findings in areas such as the foot of the Zagros Mountains and Middle Bronze Age Galilee.

== Gallery ==
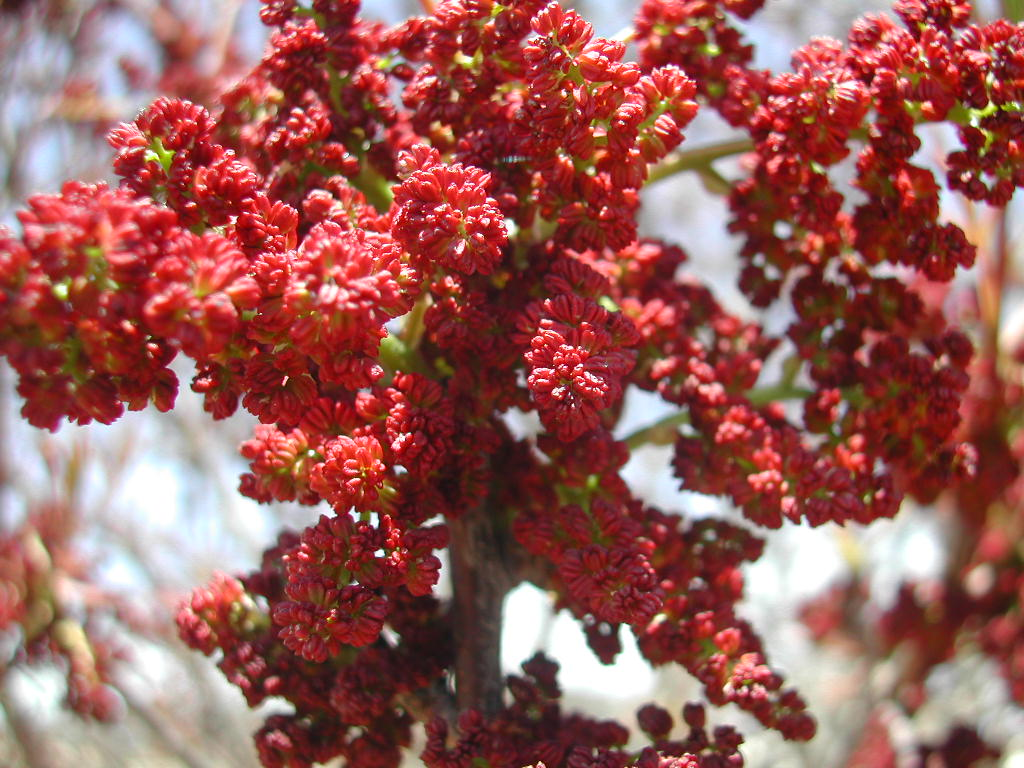
Inflorescence

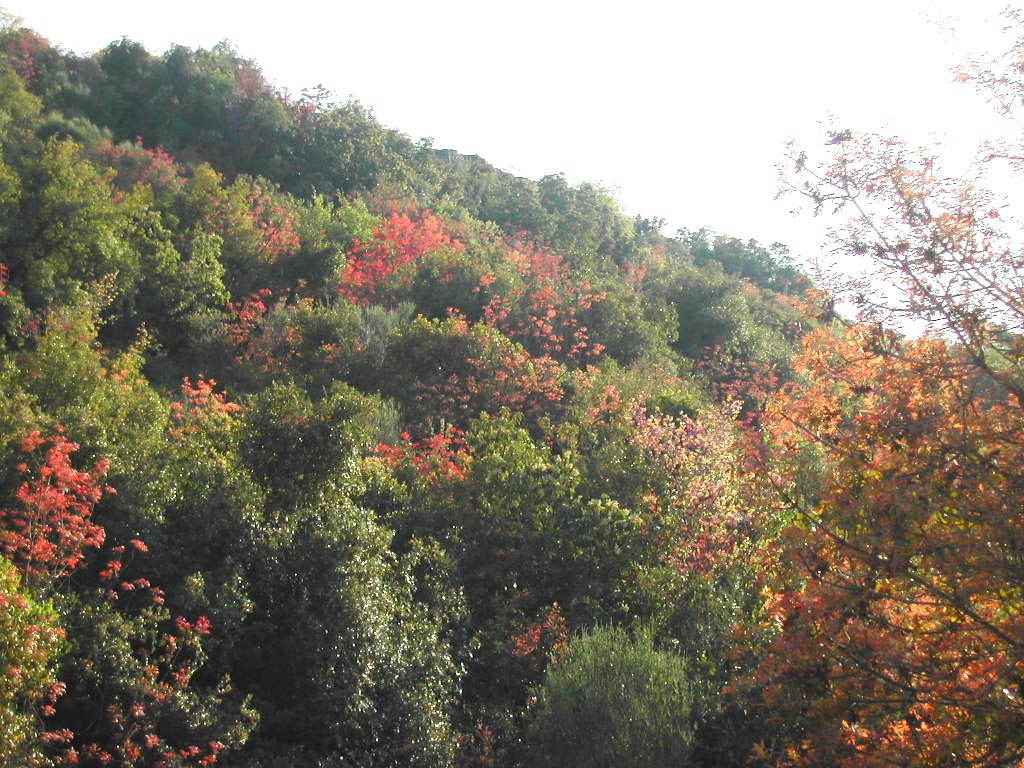
Pistacia adds red to the landscape around Mount Meron, Israel.

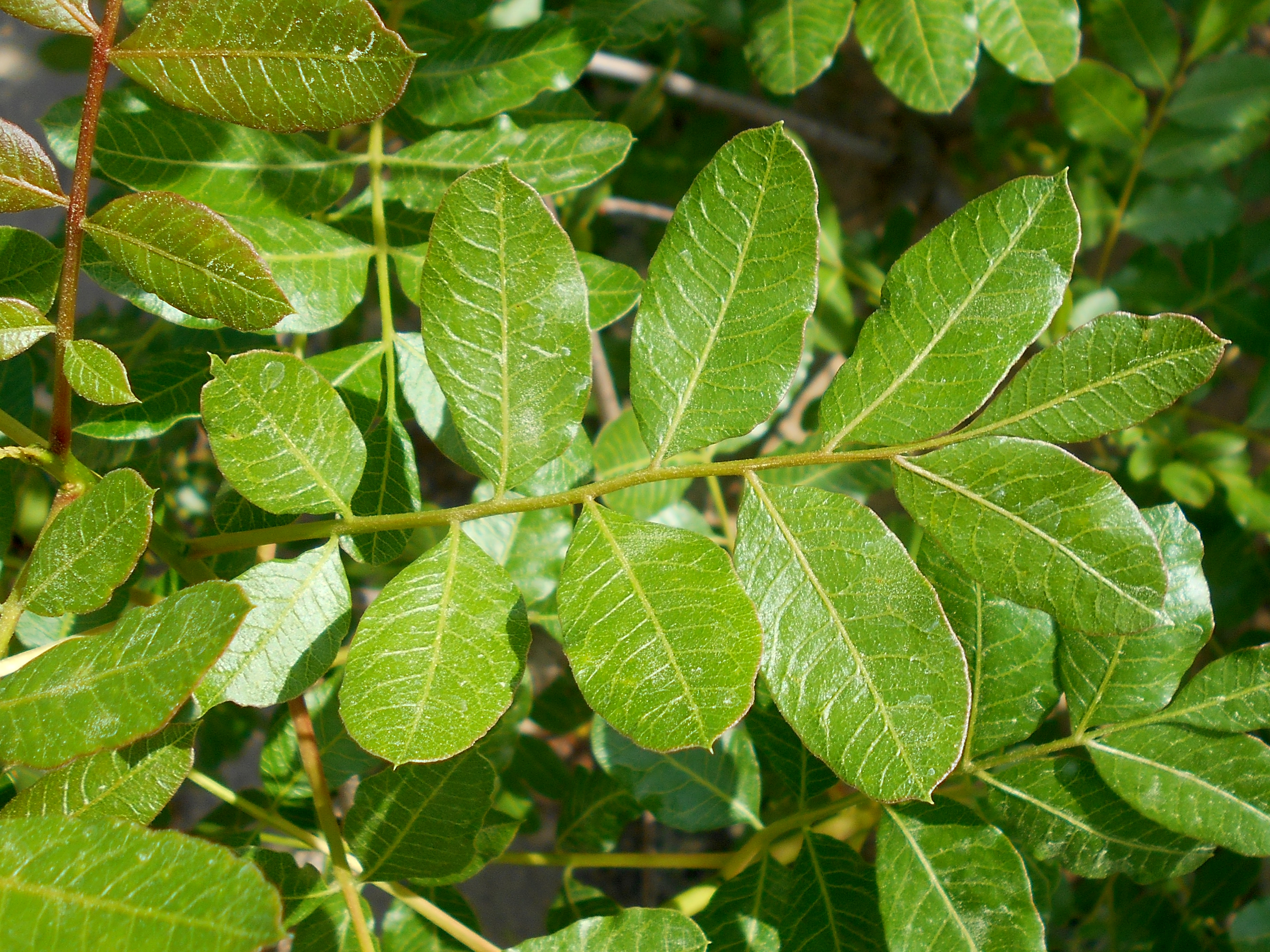
Leaves and stalk

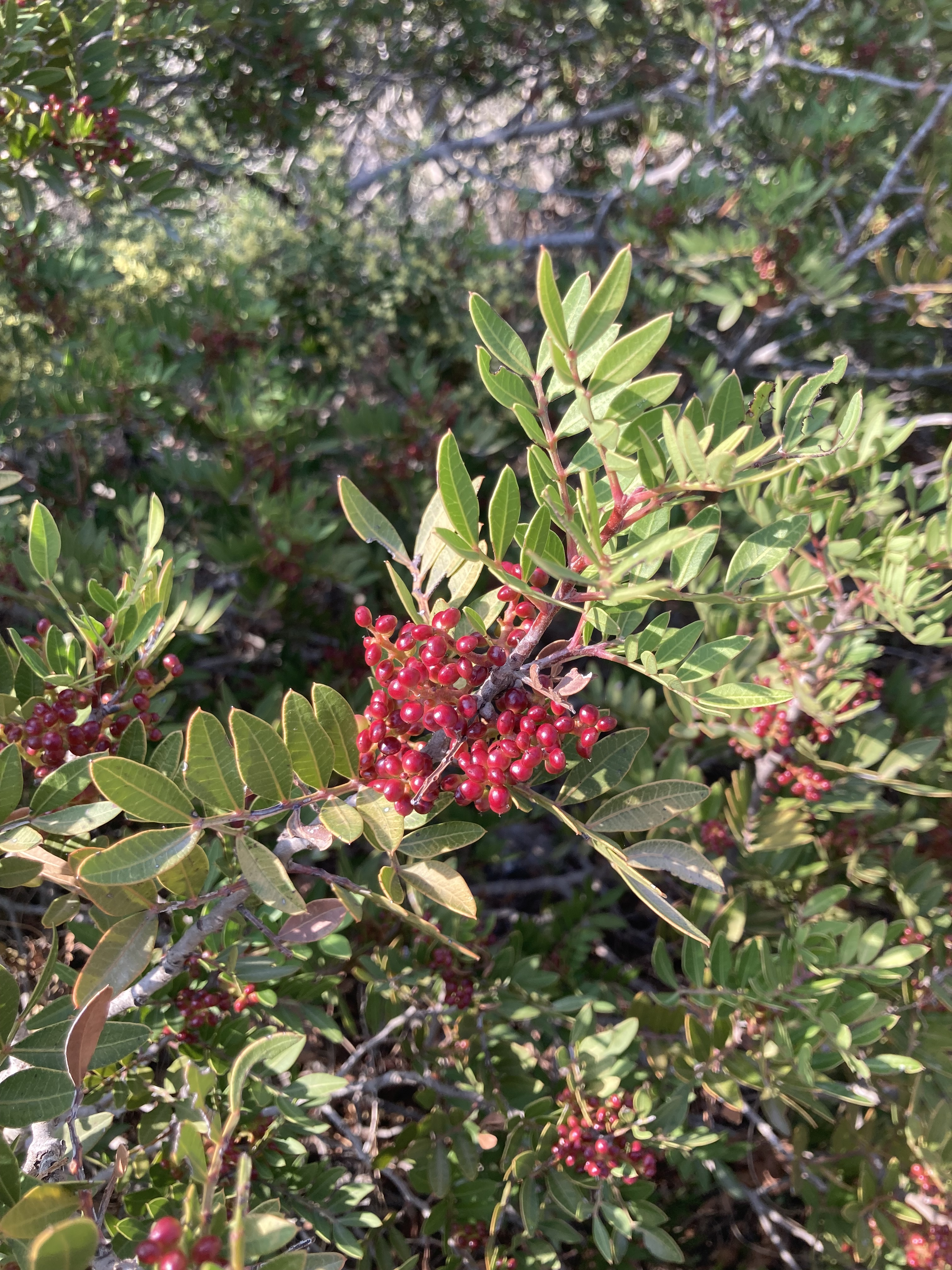
Pistacia terebinthus in Kythira

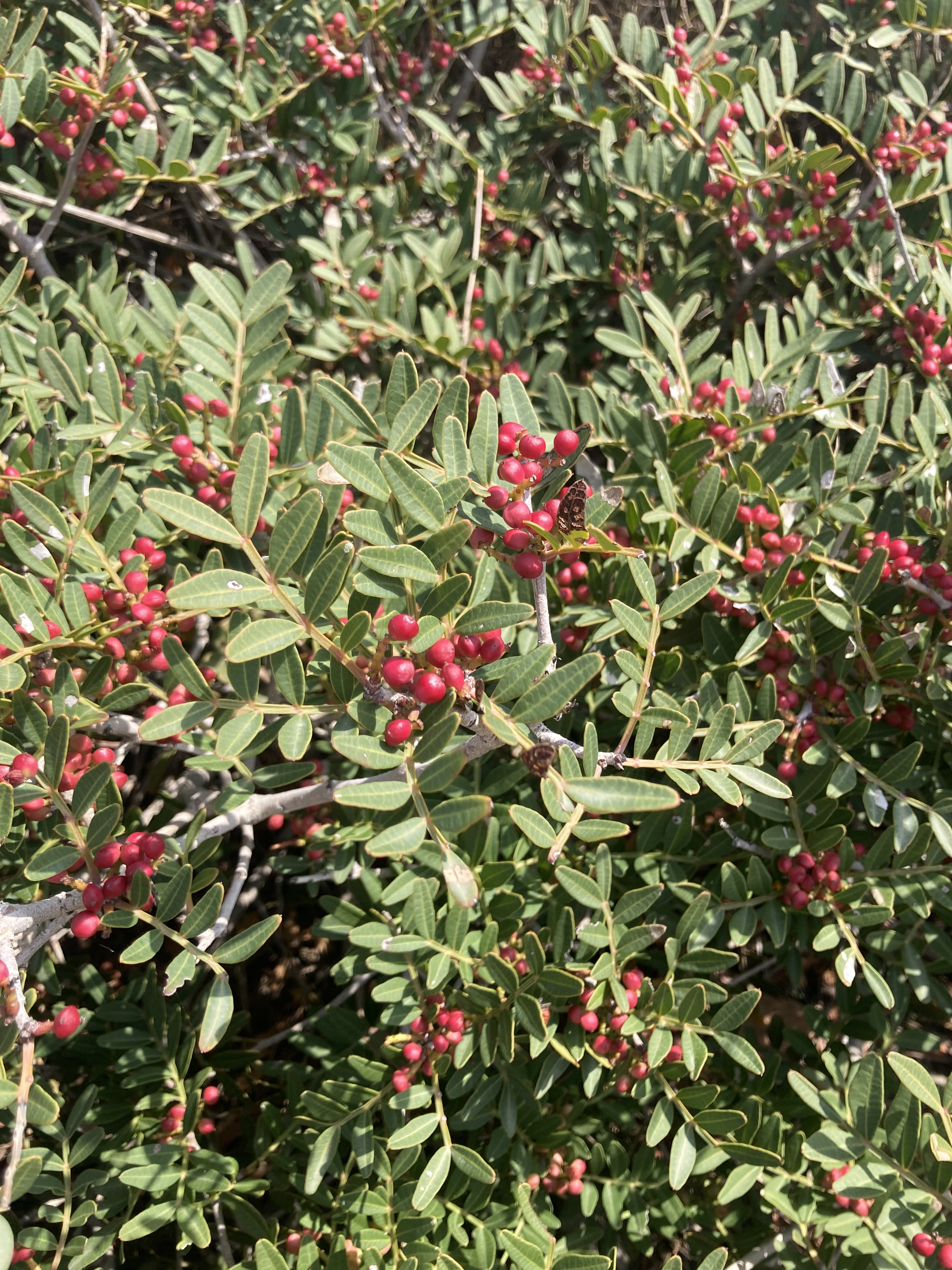
Pistacia terebinthus at Sounion

== See also ==
- Pistacia lentiscus
- Mastic (plant resin)
- Balm of Gilead
