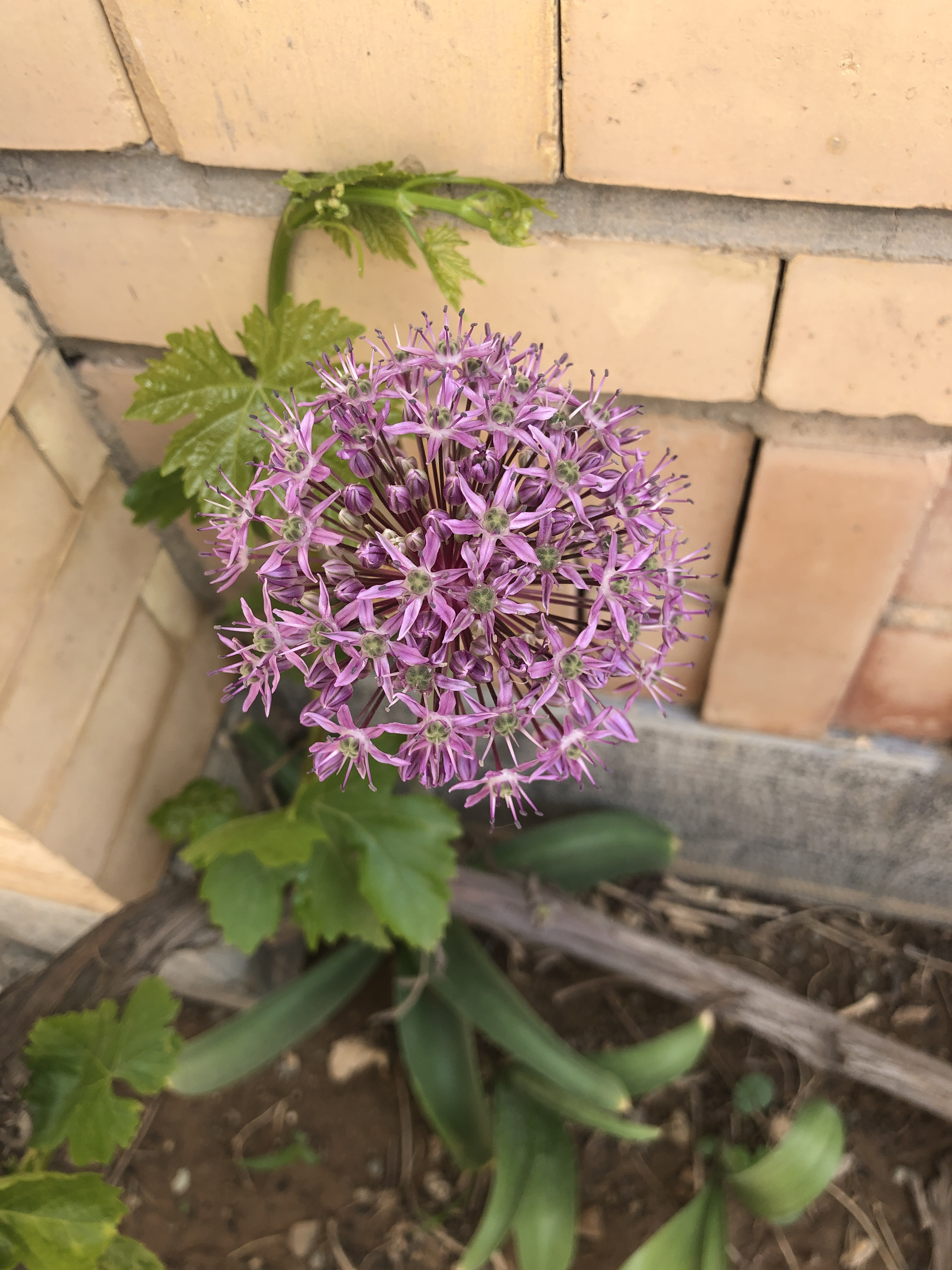

Scientific classification
- Kingdom: Plantae
- Clade: Embryophytes
- Clade: Tracheophytes
- Clade: Spermatophytes
- Clade: Angiosperms
- Clade: Monocots
- Order: Asparagales
- Family: Amaryllidaceae
- Subfamily: Allioideae
- Genus: Allium
- Subgenus: Allium subg. Melanocrommyum
- Species: A. haemanthoides

Binomial name
- Allium haemanthoides Boiss. & Reut. ex Regel

Synonyms
- Allium akaka subsp. haemanthoides (Boiss. & Reut. ex Regel) Wendelbo

= Allium haemanthoides =

Species of flowering plant

Allium haemanthoides (Kurdish: Loosha) is a species of flowering plant in the family Amaryllidaceae. It is native to Iraq and Iran. It is a bulb-forming perennial with a densely packed umbel of white flowers with dark mideveins on the tepals.
