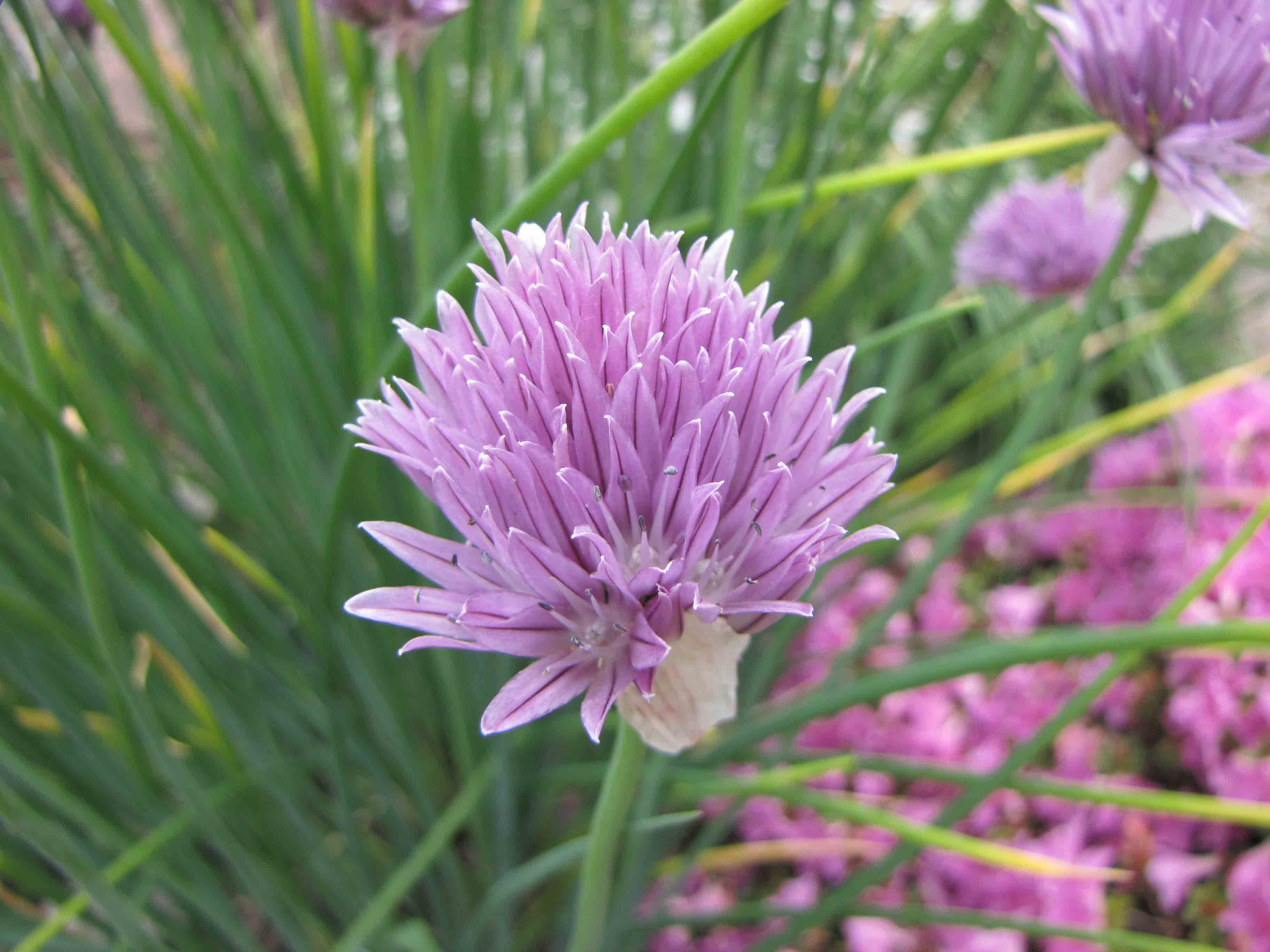

Scientific classification
- Kingdom: Plantae
- Clade: Tracheophytes
- Clade: Angiosperms
- Clade: Monocots
- Order: Asparagales
- Family: Amaryllidaceae
- Subfamily: Allioideae
- Genus: Allium
- Species: A. ledebourianum

Binomial name
- Allium ledebourianum Schultes & J.H. Schultes

Synonyms
- Allium uliginosum Ledeb. 1830, illegitimate homonym of Allium uliginosum G. Don 1827; Allium ledebourianum var. purpurascens Regel

= Allium ledebourianum =

Species of flowering plant

Allium ledebourianum is an Asian species of wild onion native to central and northeastern Asia: Kazakhstan, Mongolia, Russia (Altay Krai, Khabarovsk, Primorye, Sakhalin), and China (Heilongjiang, Jilin, Liaoning, Inner Mongolia, Xinjiang). It occurs at elevations up to 1800 m elevation.

Allium ledebourianum has a cluster of narrow bulbs up to 20 mm across. Scapes are up to 100 cm tall. Leaves are tubular, shorter than the scape. Umbel is hemispheric, densely crowded with many purple flowers; tepals pale purple with darker purple midvein.

Formerly included

Allium ledebourianum var. maximowiczii (Regel) Q.S.Sun, now called Allium maximowiczii Regel
