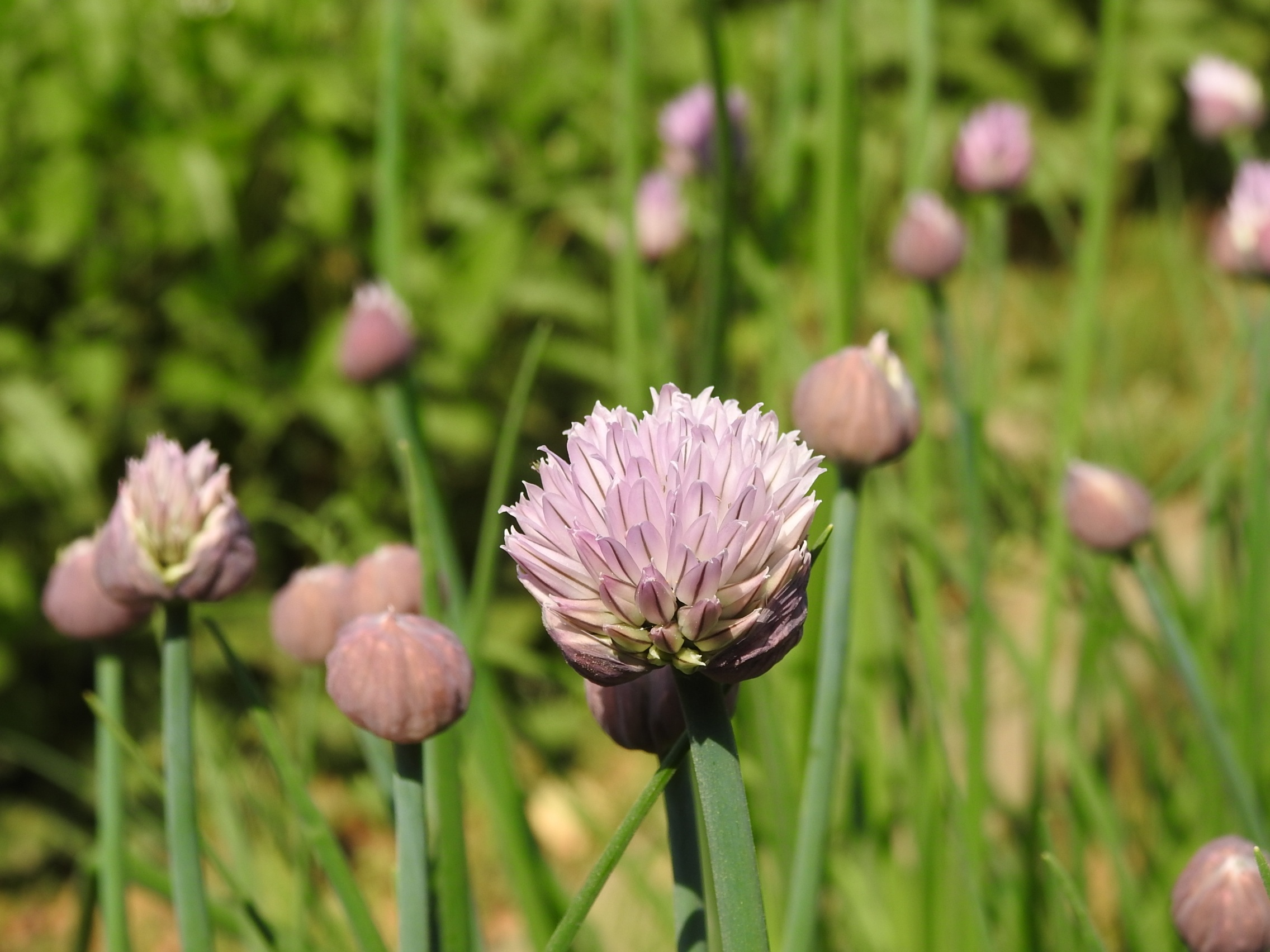

Scientific classification
- Kingdom: Plantae
- Clade: Tracheophytes
- Clade: Angiosperms
- Clade: Monocots
- Order: Asparagales
- Family: Amaryllidaceae
- Subfamily: Allioideae
- Genus: Allium
- Species: A. maximowiczii

Binomial name
- Allium maximowiczii Regel

Synonyms
- Allium ledebourianum var. maximowiczii (Regel) Q.S. Sun; Allium maximowiczii f. leucanthum (H.Hara) T.Shimizu; Allium maximowiczii var. shibutsuense (Kitam.) Ohwi; Allium maximowiczii var. yezomonticola (H.Hara) T.Shimizu; Allium prostratum Maxim. 1859, illegitimate homonym not Trevir. 1822; Allium schoenoprasum subsp. maximowiczii (Regel) Bondarenko ex Korovina; Allium schoenoprasum var. bellum Kitam.; Allium schoenoprasum f. leucanthum H.Hara; Allium schoenoprasum var. orientale Regel; Allium schoenoprasum var. shibutsuense Kitam.; Allium schoenoprasum var. yezomonticola H.Hara

= Allium maximowiczii =

Oriental chive

Species of flowering plant

Allium maximowiczii, English common name oriental chive, is an Asian plant species native to Siberia, the Russian Far East, Mongolia, Japan, Korea and northeastern China (Heilongjiang, Jilin and Inner Mongolia).

Allium maximowiczii produces one or two bulbs. Scape is up to 70 cm tall. Leaves are tubular, shorter than the scape. Umbels are densely packed with large numbers of pink or red flowers.
