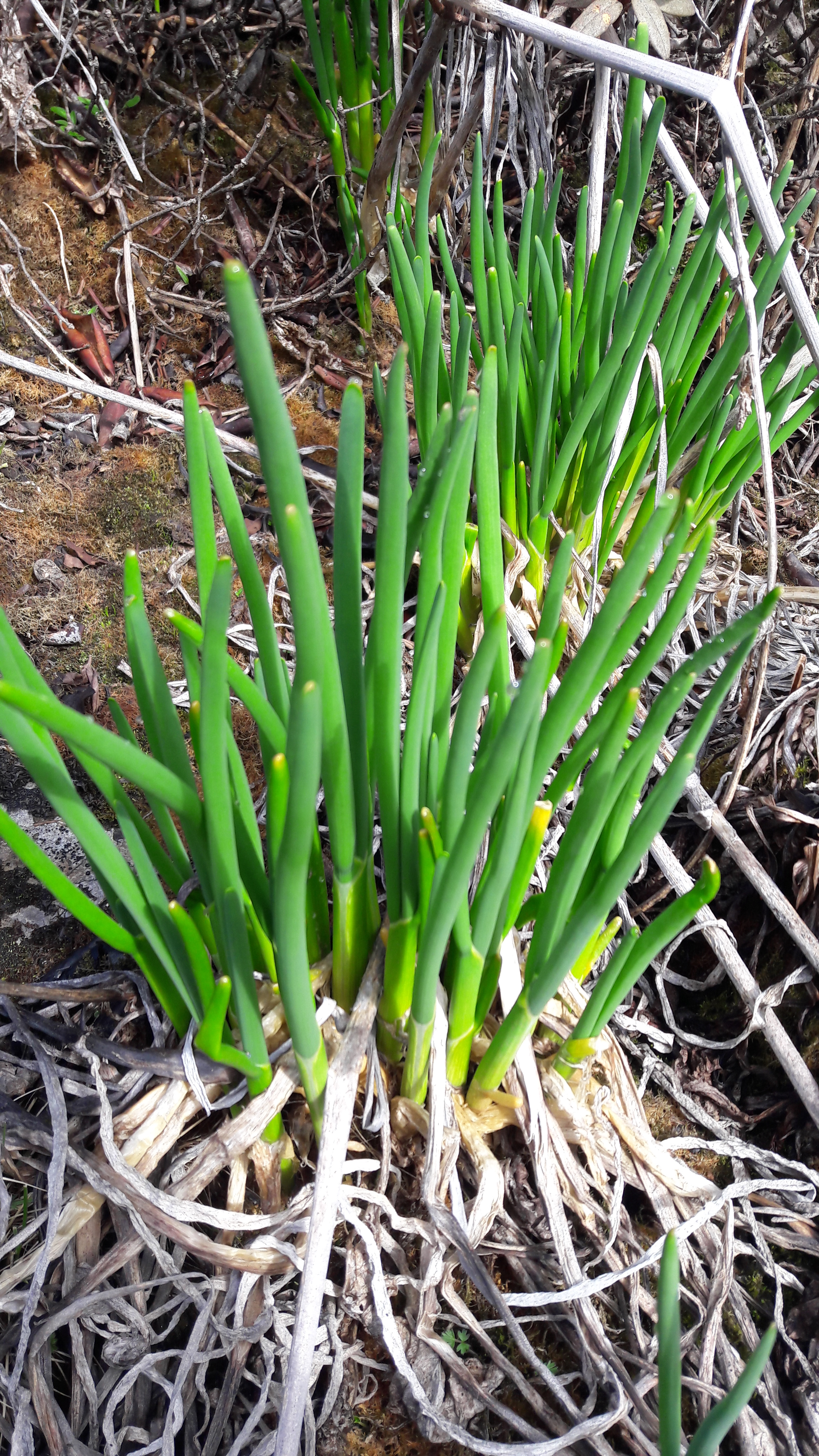

Conservation status
- Least Concern (IUCN 3.1)

Scientific classification
- Kingdom: Plantae
- Clade: Tracheophytes
- Clade: Angiosperms
- Clade: Monocots
- Order: Asparagales
- Family: Amaryllidaceae
- Subfamily: Allioideae
- Genus: Allium
- Species: A. rhabdotum

Binomial name
- Allium rhabdotum Stearn

= Allium rhabdotum =

Species of flowering plant

Allium rhabdotum is a species of flowering plant endemic to Bhutan.
