= Taxonomy of Allium =

Classification of the plant genus Allium

The precise taxonomy of the genus Allium is still poorly understood with incorrect descriptions being widespread. With over 850 species distributed over the Northern Hemisphere Allium is the sole genus in the Allieae, one of four tribes of subfamily Allioideae (Amaryllidaceae). New species continue to be described and Allium is both highly variable and one of the largest monocotyledonous genera, but the precise taxonomy of Allium is poorly understood, with incorrect descriptions being widespread. The difficulties arise from the fact that the genus displays considerable polymorphism and has adapted to a wide variety of habitats. Furthermore, traditional classifications had been based on homoplasious characteristics (what turn out to be independently evolved similar features in species from different lineages). However, the genus has been shown to be monophyletic, containing three major clades, although some proposed subgenera are not. Some progress is being made using molecular phylogenetic methods, and the internal transcribed spacer (ITS) region, including the 5.8S rDNA and the two spacers ITS1 and ITS2, is one of the more commonly used markers in the study of the differentiation of the Allium species.

Allium includes a number of taxonomic groupings previously considered separate genera (Caloscordum Herb., Milula Prain and Nectaroscordum Lindl.) Allium spicatum had been treated by many authors as Milula spicata, the only species in the monospecific genus Milula. In 2000, it was shown to be embedded in Allium.

== Description ==
The genus Allium are herbaceous geophytes is characterised by bulbs enclosed in membranous tunics, that may become fibrous and may be carried on rhizomes, with tepals that are free or almost free, and a subgynobasic style. The majority of species produce cysteine sulfoxides that are the source of their distinctive garlic and onion odor and taste. About twenty species are grown as edible crops, such as onions, garlic and leeks, while others are foraged from the wild, such as ramps. Many species are xerophytic and the over 850 species are found almost exclusively in the Northern Hemisphere, being particularly diverse in the warm dry summers and cool wet winters of the Mediterranean. The main centre of diversity is the Old World with species rich areas in Central Asia as well as the Mediterranean Basin. A second centre, in the New World, is western North America.

== History ==
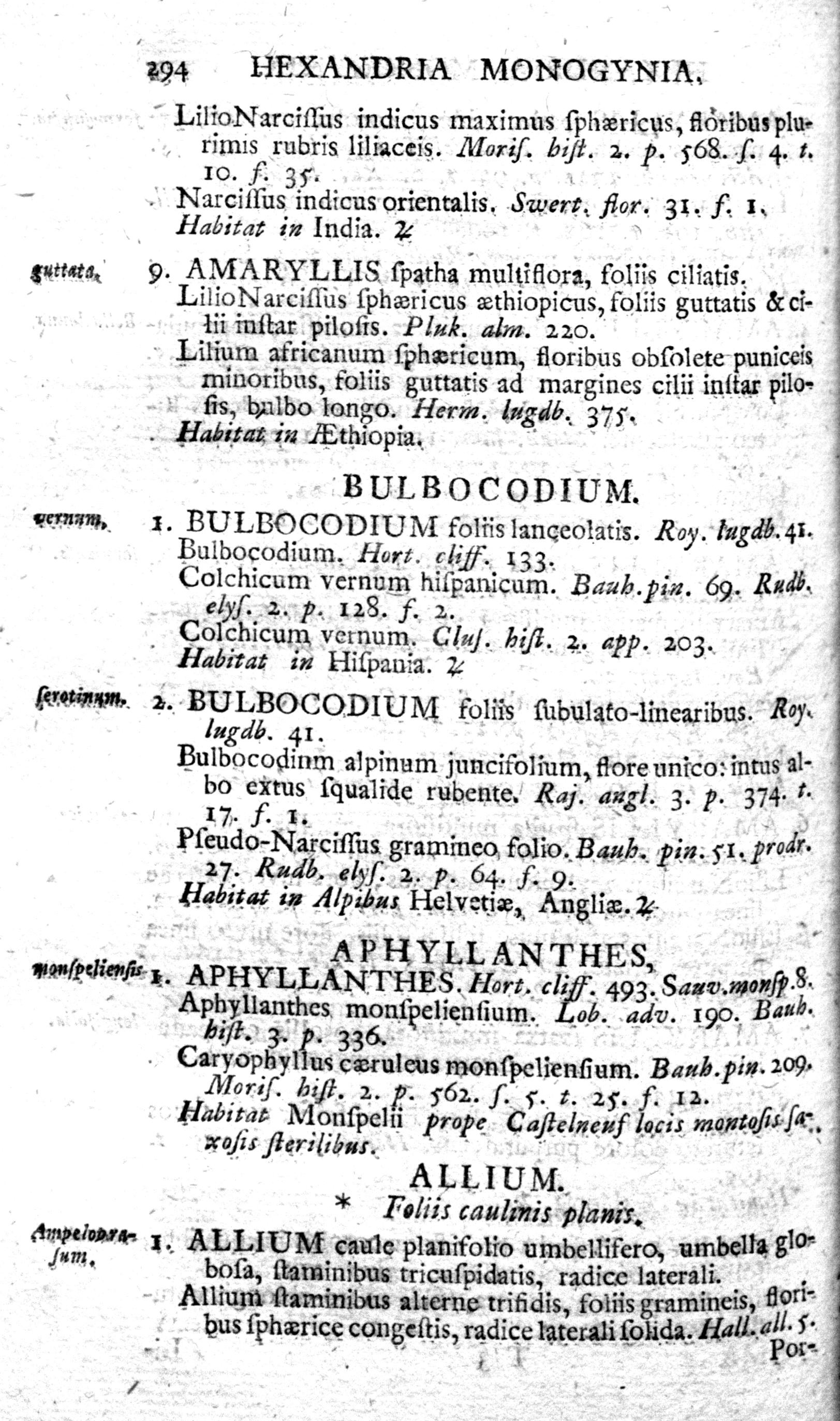
Linnaeus' description of Allium, Species Plantarum 1753

Descriptions of Allium taxonomy date back at least as far as Carolus Clusius' Rariarum plantarum historia (1601). When Linnaeus formerly described the genus Allium in his Species Plantarum (1753), there were thirty species with this name. He placed Allium in a grouping he referred to as Hexandria monogynia (i.e. six stamens and one pistil) containing 51 genera in all. In 1763, Michel Adanson, who proposed the concept of families of plants, included Allium and related genera as a grouping within 'Liliaceae' as Section IV, Les Oignons (Onions), or Cepae in Latin. De Jussieu is officially recognised as the first formal establishment of the suprageneric grouping into families (Ordo) in 1789. In this system Allium was one of fourteen genera in Ordo VI, Asphodeles (Asphodeli), of the third class (Stamina epigyna) of Monocots. Jean Henri Jaume Saint-Hilaire (1805), who developed the concept of Amaryllidaceae, continued Jussieu's treatment of Allium under Asphodeli (which he considered synonymous with Adanson's Liliaceae and Jussieu's Asphodeli). He placed Allium in an unnamed monotypic section of Asphodeli defined as Fleurs en ombelle, racine bulbeuse. Calice à six parties egales (umbellate flowers, bulbous, calyx of six equal parts).

Subsequently, de Candolle reverted the family name back to Liliaceae from Asphodeli. He divided the Liliaceae into a series of Ordres, and the second ordre was named Asphodèles, based on Jussieus' family of that name, in which he placed Allium. The term 'Alliaceae' then reappeared in its subfamilial form, Allieae, in Dumortier's Florula Belgica (1827), with six genera. The 'Alliaceae' have been treated as Allieae within the family Liliaceae (or Aspholecaceae, a partial synonym) by most authorities since.

Regel produced a major monograph of the genus in 1875, and this remained the major reference work for over 100 years till the molecularly based study of Friesen and colleagues in 2006. Despite recent advances the precise taxonomy of Allium remains still poorly understood with incorrect descriptions being widespread.

== Phylogeny ==
- Amaryllidaceae: Subfamily Allioideae
  - - - Tribe Allieae (monogeneric, Allium)
      - - Tribe Tulbaghieae
        - Tribes Gilliesieae, Leucocoryneae

== Subdivision ==
Linnaeus originally grouped his 30 species into three alliances, e.g. Foliis caulinis planis and as the number of recognised species increased, so did the number of subgroups. Since then, many attempts have been made to divide the growing number of recognised species into infrageneric subgroupings, initially as sections, and then as subgenera further divided into sections. For a brief history, see Friesen et al. (2006) and Li et al. (2010) Regel's 1875 treatise on Allium divided his 262 species between the six sections proposed by Don, in his 1832 monograph on the genus. Stearn (1944) described 14 subgenera. Traub (1968) described 3 subgenera, 36 sections and subsections and about 600 species. By 1992 there were 6 sub-genera, 50 sections and subsections and 600–700 species. The situation was further confused by the presence of over 1,000 taxonomic names, many of which turned out to be synonyms.

The modern era of phylogenetic analysis dates to 1996. In 2006 Friesen, Fritsch, and Blattner described a new classification with 15 subgenera, 56 sections, and about 780 species based on the nuclear ribosomal gene internal transcribed spacers. Some of the subgenera correspond to the once separate genera (Caloscordum, Milula, Nectaroscordum) included in the Gilliesieae. The terminology has varied with some authors subdividing subgenera into Sections and others Alliances.

The term alliance has been used for both subgroupings within species, e.g. Allium nigrum, as well as infrageneric subsections. These alliances are informal groupings based on morphological similarity and reflecting hypotheses of evolutionary relationship. and can be used between any two formal ranks. For instance the some 70 North American species were divided into nine well-defined species alliances, of which the largest was the Allium falcifolium alliance with 31 taxa. These alliances are usually referred to as the Ownbey alliances, after Marion Ownbey and were also used by Traub. A number of classification schemes have chosen to retain these, the Traub system not being universally accepted.

Subsequent molecular phylogenetic studies have shown the 2006 classification is a considerable improvement over previous classifications, but some of its subgenera and sections are probably not monophyletic. Meanwhile, the number of new species continued to increase, reaching 800 by 2009, 900 by 2016 and the pace of discovery has not decreased. Detailed studies have focused on a number of subgenera, including Amerallium. Amerallium is strongly supported as monophyletic. Subgenus Melanocrommyum has also been the subject of considerable study (see below), while work on subgenus Allium has focused on section Allium, including Allium ampeloprasum, although sampling was not sufficient to test the monophyly of the section.

The major evolutionary lineages or lines correspond to the three major clades. Line one (the oldest) with three subgenera is predominantly bulbous, the second, with five subgenera and the third with seven subgenera contain both bulbous and rhizomatous taxa. Banfi and colleagues (2011) have suggested that the phylogenetic trichotomy of this genus Allium sensu lato is sufficiently distinct as to warrant splitting it into three separate genera. Banfi's scheme thus proposes the restoring the three originally separate genera Nectaroscordum Lindl. (type: N. siculum), Caloscordum Herb. (type: C. neriniflorum) and Allium L. sensu stricto (type: A. sativum) to correspond to lines 1-3.

=== Evolutionary lines and subgenera ===
The three evolutionary lineages and 15 subgenera here represent the classification schemes of Friesen et al. (2006) and Li (2010), and subsequent additional species and revisions.

Cladogram of evolutionary lines in Allium

- Allium
  - First evolutionary line
  - - Second evolutionary line
    - Third evolutionary line

Evolutionary lines and subgenera (number of sections/number of species)

- First evolutionary line (3 subgenera)
  1. Nectaroscordum (Lindl.) Asch. et Graebn Type: Allium siculum (1/3) Mediterranean bells, Sicilian honey garlic
  2. Microscordum (Maxim.) N. Friesen Type: Allium monanthum (1/1)
  3. Amerallium Traub Type: Allium canadense (12/135)
- Second evolutionary line (5 subgenera)
  1. Caloscordum (Herb.) R. M. Fritsch Type: Allium neriniflorum (1/3)
  2. Anguinum (G. Don ex Koch) N. Friesen Type: Allium victorialis (1/12)
  3. Porphyroprason (Ekberg) R. M. Fritsch Type: Allium oreophilum (1/1)
  4. Vvedenskya (Kamelin) R. M. Fritsch Type: Allium kujukense (1/1)
  5. Melanocrommyum (Webb et Berthel.) Rouy Type: Allium nigrum (20/160)
- Third evolutionary line (7 subgenera)
  1. Butomissa (Salisb.) N. Friesen Type: Allium ramosum (2/4) fragrant garlic
  2. Cyathophora R. M. Fritsch Type: Allium cyathophorum (3/5)
  3. Rhizirideum (G. Don ex Koch) Wendelbo s.s Type: Allium senescens (5/37)
  4. Allium L. Type: Allium sativum (15/300)
  5. Reticulatobulbosa (Kamelin) N. Friesen Type: Allium lineare (5/80)
  6. Polyprason Radic Type: Allium moschatum (4/50)
  7. Cepa (Mill.) Radic ́ Type: Allium cepa (5/30) onion, garden onion, bulb onion, common onion

==== First evolutionary line ====
Although this lineage consists of three subgenera, nearly all the species are attributed to subgenus Amerallium, the third largest subgenus of Allium. The lineage is considered to represent the most ancient line within Allium, and to be the only lineage that is predominantly bulbous, the other two having both bulbous and rhizomatous taxa. Nectaroscordum and Microscordum are bulbous, but Amerallium contains some rhizomatous elements. Within this lineage Amerallium is a sister group to the other two subgenera (Microscordum+Nectaroscordum).

===== Subgenus Nectaroscordum =====
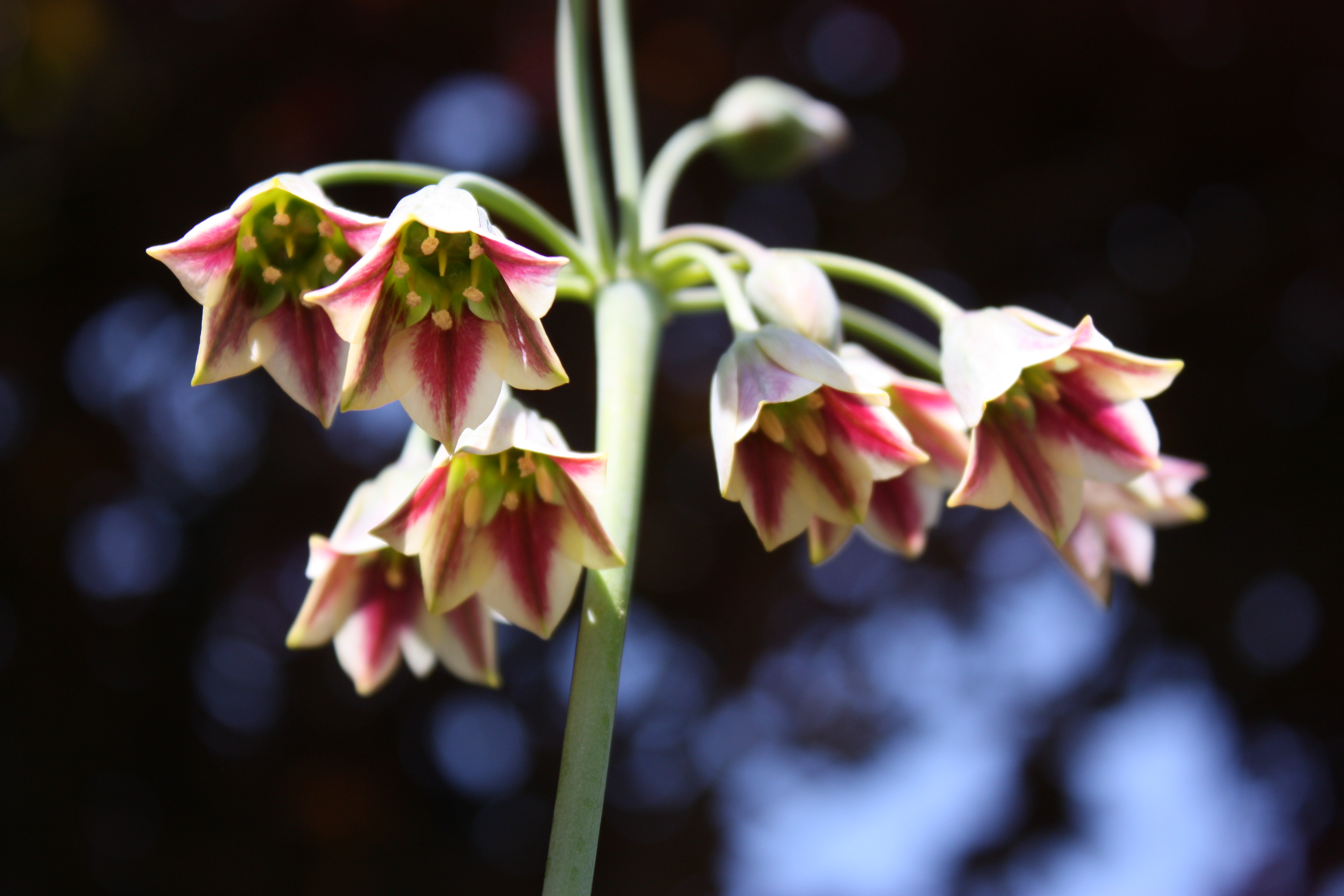
Type species: Allium siculum

Disjunct distribution, involving the western Mediterranean (type species) and southwest Asia

- Section Nectaroscordum (Lindl.) Gren. & Godr.
  - Allium siculum Ucria (Syn. Nectaroscordum siculum (Ucria) Lindl.) Type
  - Allium tripedale Trautv.

===== Subgenus Microscordum =====
East Asia

  - Section Microscordum Maxim.
    - Allium monanthum Maxim.

===== Subgenus Amerallium =====
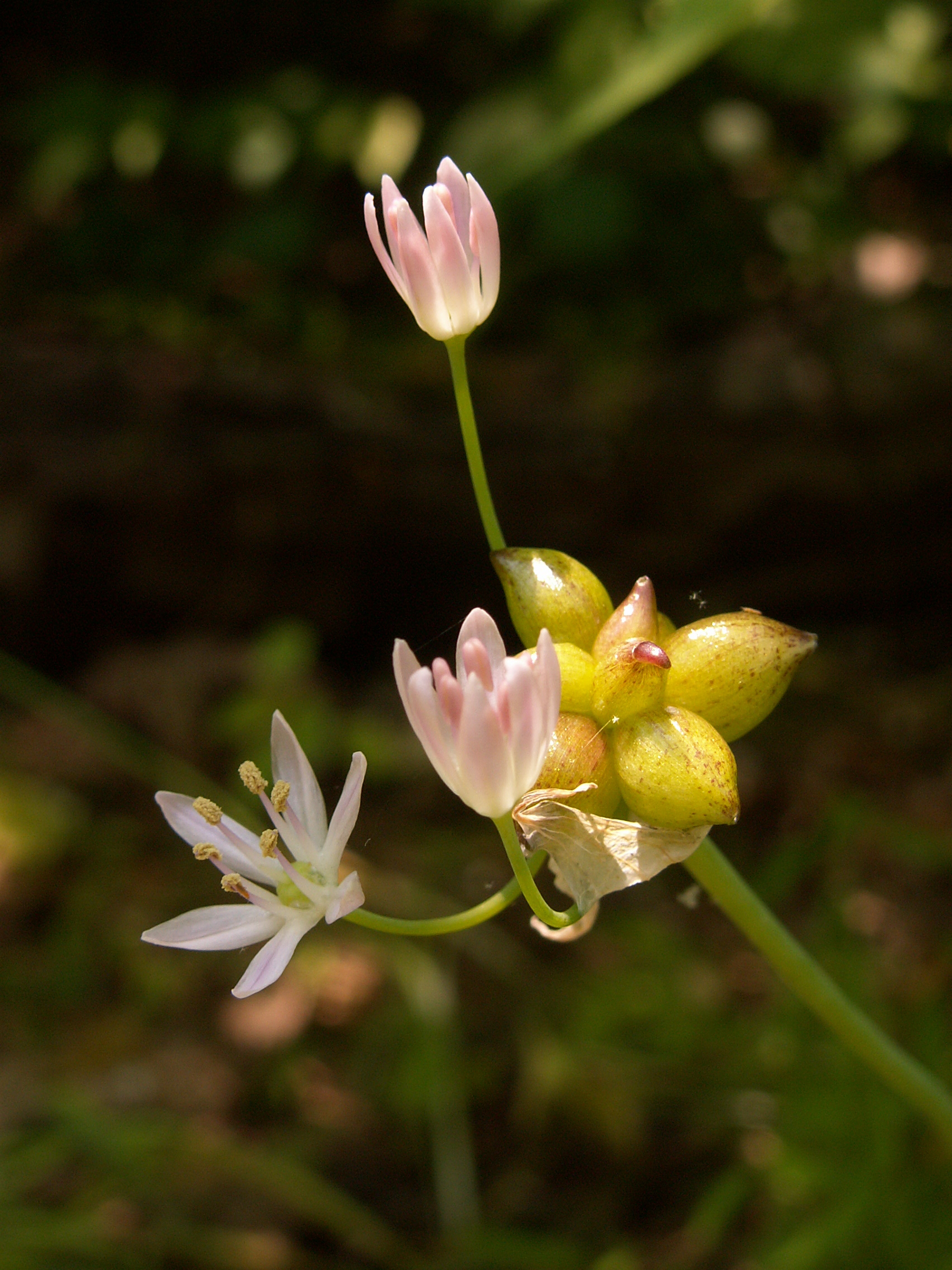
Type species: Allium canadense

This large monophyletic subgenus is extremely diverse, both morphologically and ecologically and is characterised by leaves with one row of vascular bundles, absence of palisade parenchyma and a subepidermal position of laticifers, with a predominant base chromosome number x=7.

Taxonomy

Amerallium is a relatively large subgenus with about 120–140 species. Under the alliance system of classification proposed by Ownbey (1966), species north of Mexico and two Mexican endemics were treated as eight informal alliances: the A. acuminatum, A. campanulatum, A. canadense, A. cernuum, A. falcifolium, A. kunthii, A. sanbornii, and A. validum alliances. Traub (1968) then arranged the New World alliances into four sections: Amerallium Traub, Caulorhizideum Traub, Lophioprason Traub, and Rhopetoprason Traub. In addition he arranged the Old World species into 6 sections.

Since Traub's revision of the subgenus, two biogeographical sister clades (or alliances) have been recognised. The Old World clade is represented by two relatively small groups from the Mediterranean and East Asia. The larger New World clade by all North American species of Allium. The New World sections are Lophioprason, Amerallium, and Rhophetoprason, while the Old World is represented by sections Arctoprasum, Briseis, Narkissoprason, Molium, Bromatorrhiza and Rhynchocarpum.

The subgenus is thought to originate in the Old World, with a later split, and to have its origin in the higher latitudes of East Asia, at the time of transition from Cretaceous to Tertiary, dispersing to western North America. Twelve sections were subsequently recognized, with sections Amerallium and Molium further split into two subsections.

Distribution

Amerallium is widely distributed within North America, Europe, north Africa, Ethiopia, the Caucasus, northern Iran, southeast Tibet, and southwest China. The greatest species diversity occurs in North America with 81 species recognized in the 2002 Flora of North America (north of Mexico) and a further 13 are unique to Mexico, and a total of 26 species recognised there. Within N America, the genus covers most of the area south of the 53rd parallel, including the oak hillsides of California and Oregon, deserts of Nevada and Texas, alpine meadows of Utah and Idaho, prairies of Nebraska and Manitoba, and forest glades of Missouri and Arkansas.

Uses

Both bulbous and rhizomatous species occur in both Old World and New World alliances. The subgenus includes both ornamentals, such as A. moly, A. roseum, A. unifolium and A. neapolitanum, and culinary species such as A. ursinum.

15 Sections

====== Section Amerallium ======
- Section Amerallium (Traub) Kamelin
  - Allium canadense L. (Syn. Allium mutabile Michx.) Type Canadian garlic
  - Allium cuthbertii Small striped garlic
  - Allium drummondii Regel (Syn. Allium nuttallii S.Watson)
  - Allium geyeri S. Watson (including Allium fibrosum Regel)
  - Allium textile A.Nelson & J.F.Macbr.— prairie onion

====== Section Arctoprasum ======
- Section Arctoprasum Kirschl.

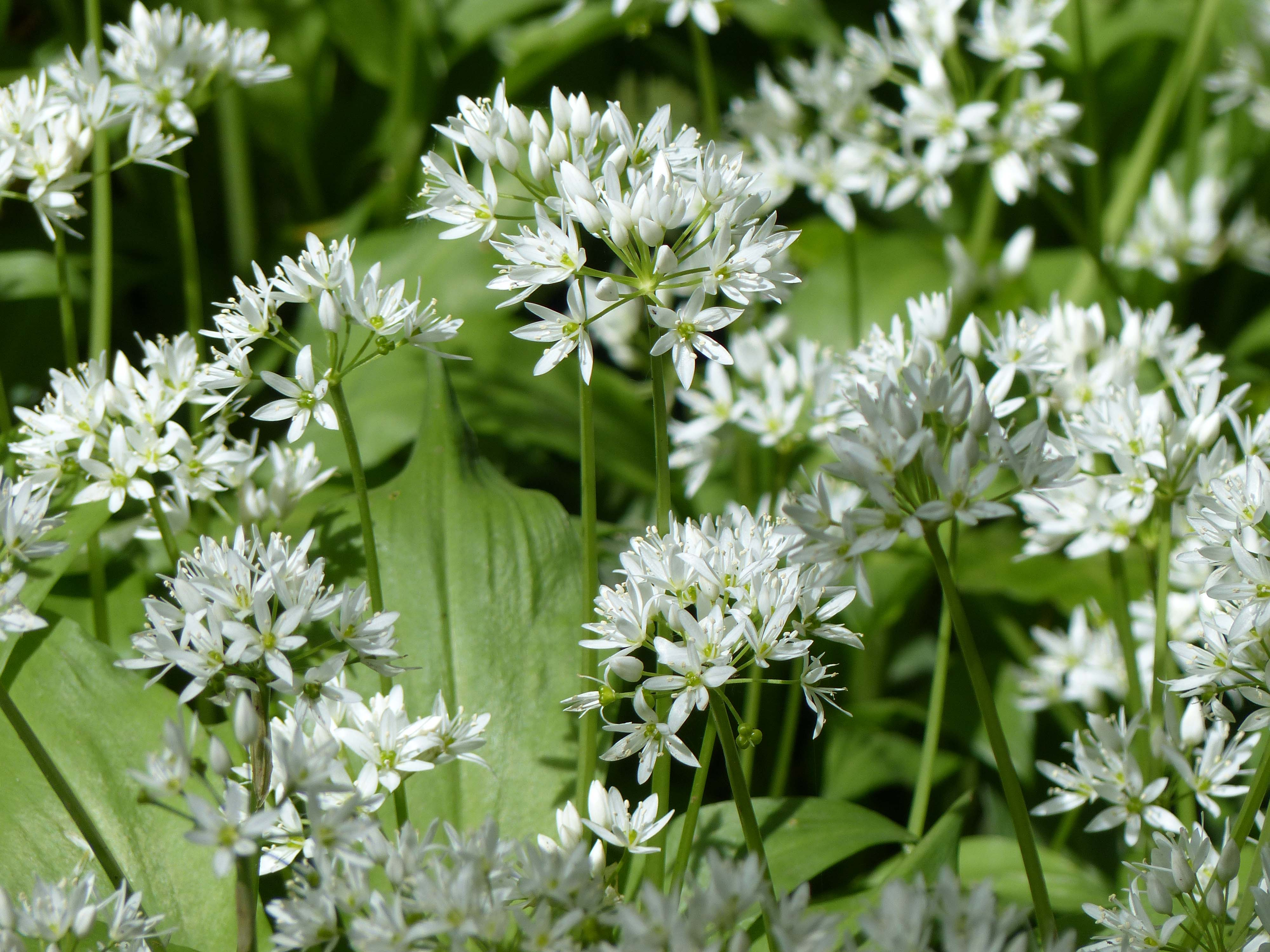
Arctoprasum: A. ursinum

  - Allium ursinum L. ramsons, buckrams, wild garlic, broad-leaved garlic, wood garlic, bear's garlic

====== Section Briseis ======
- Section Briseis (Salesb.) Stearn
  - Allium paradoxum (M.Bieb.) G.Don few-flowered garlic
  - Allium triquetrum L. Type three-cornered leek, triquetous garlic

====== Section Bromatorrhiza ======
- Section Bromatorrhiza Ekberg

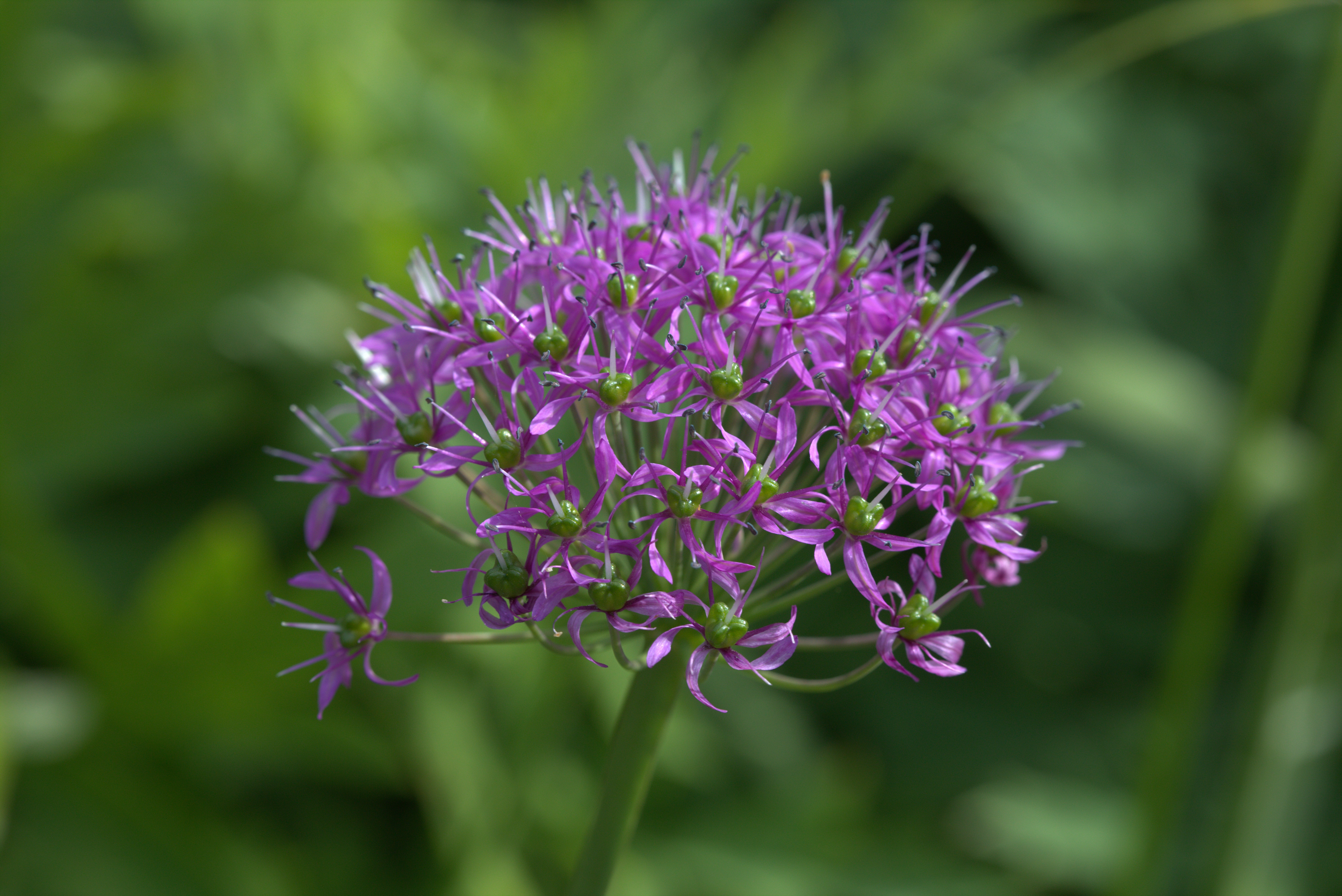
Bromatorrhiza: A. wallichii

  - Allium hookeri Thwaites
  - Allium macranthum Baker (Syn. Allium oviflorum Regel)
  - Allium pendulinum Ten.
  - Allium wallichii Kunth (Syn. Allium polyastrum Diels, Allium wallichianum Steud. nom. nud.) Type

====== Section Caulorhizideum ======
- Section Caulorhizideum Traub

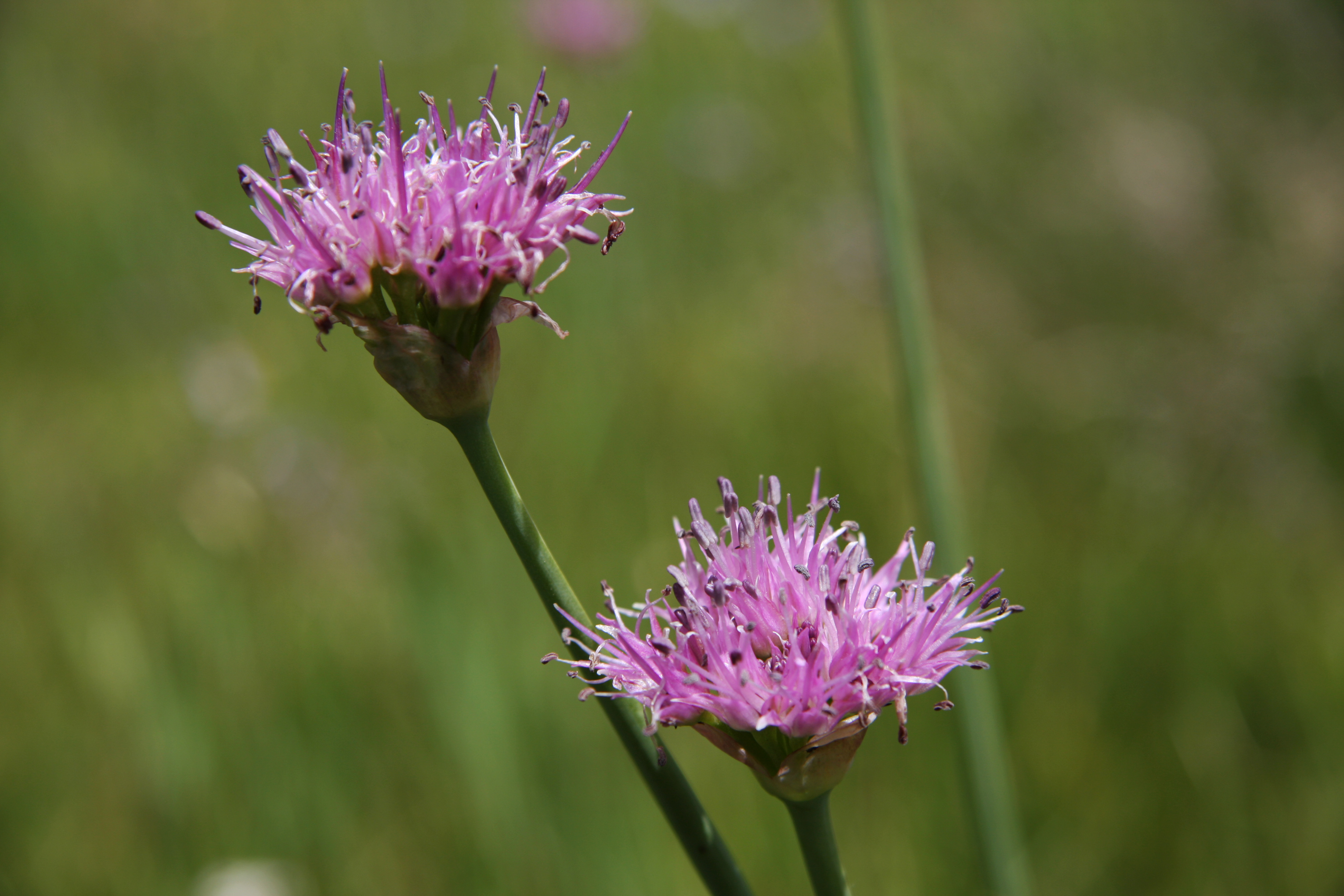
Caulorhizideum: A. validum

  - Allium validum S.Watson

====== Section Chamaeprason ======
- Section Chamaeprason Hermann
  - Allium brevistylum S.Watson
  - Allium gooddingii Ownbey
  - Allium chamaemoly L. Type

====== Section Lophioprason ======
- Section Lophioprason Traub

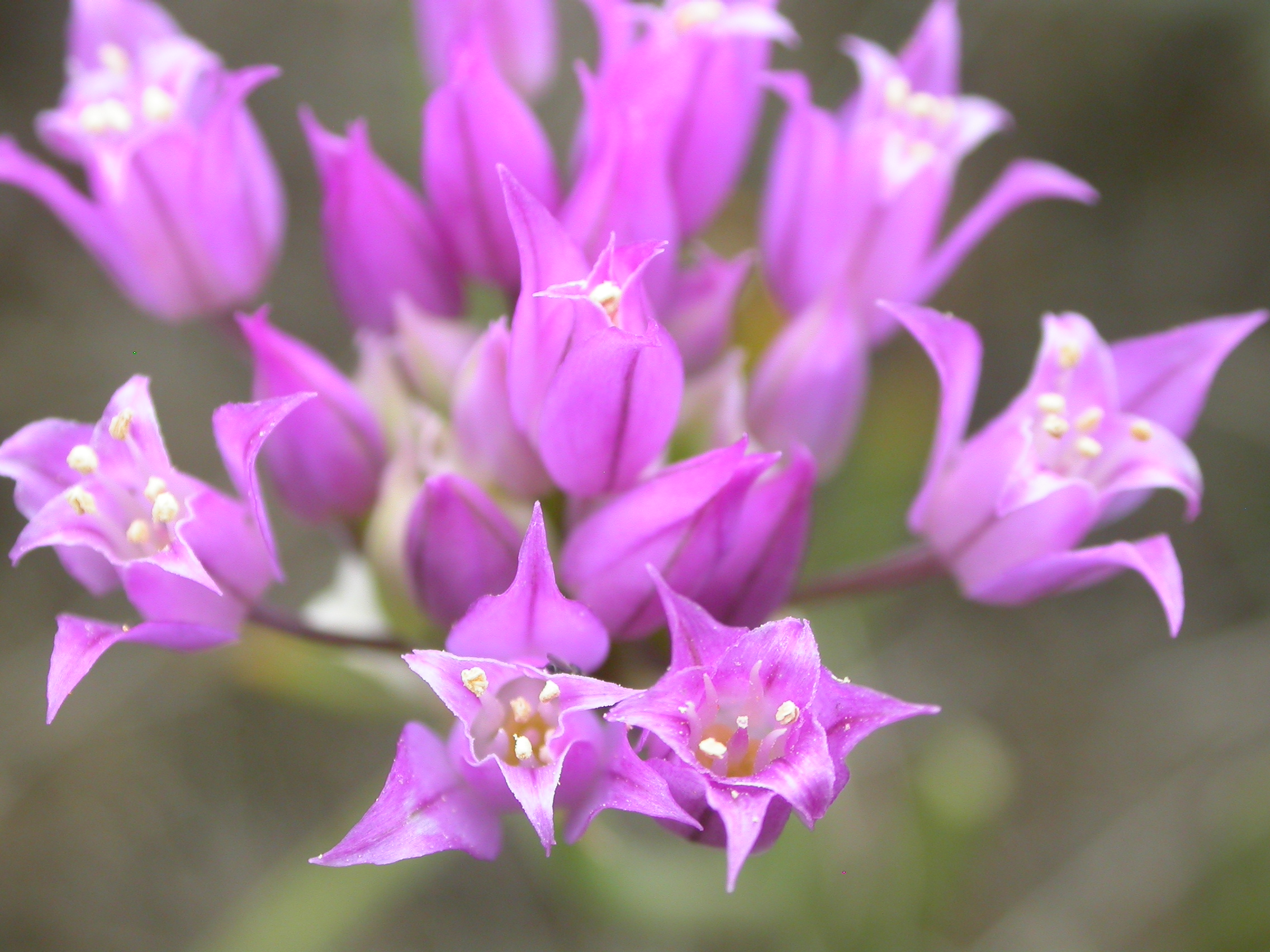
Lophioprason: A. acuminatum

  - Allium acuminatum Hook. tapertip onion, Hooker's onion
  - Allium amplectens Torr. (Syn. Allium attenuifolium Kellogg)
  - Allium anceps Kellog twinleaf onion
  - Allium atrorubens S. Wats. dark red onion
  - Allium bigelovii S.Watson
  - Allium brandegeei S.Watson Brandegee’s Onion
  - Allium campanulatum S.Watson (Syn.: Allium bidwelliae S.Watson) dusky onion
  - Allium cernuum Roth (Syn. Allium allegheniense Small) nodding onion
  - Allium crispum Greene
  - Allium falcifolium Hook. & Arn.
  - Allium fimbriatum S.Watson
  - Allium lemmonii S.Watson
  - Allium munzii (Ownbey & Aase ex Traub) McNeal
  - Allium nevii S. Wats. — Nevius' garlic
  - Allium praecox Brandegee
  - Allium sanbornii Wood Type
  - Allium siskiyouense Ownbey ex Traub
  - Allium stellatum Ker Gawl.
  - Allium unifolium Kellogg

====== Section Molium ======
- Section Molium G.Don ex Koch

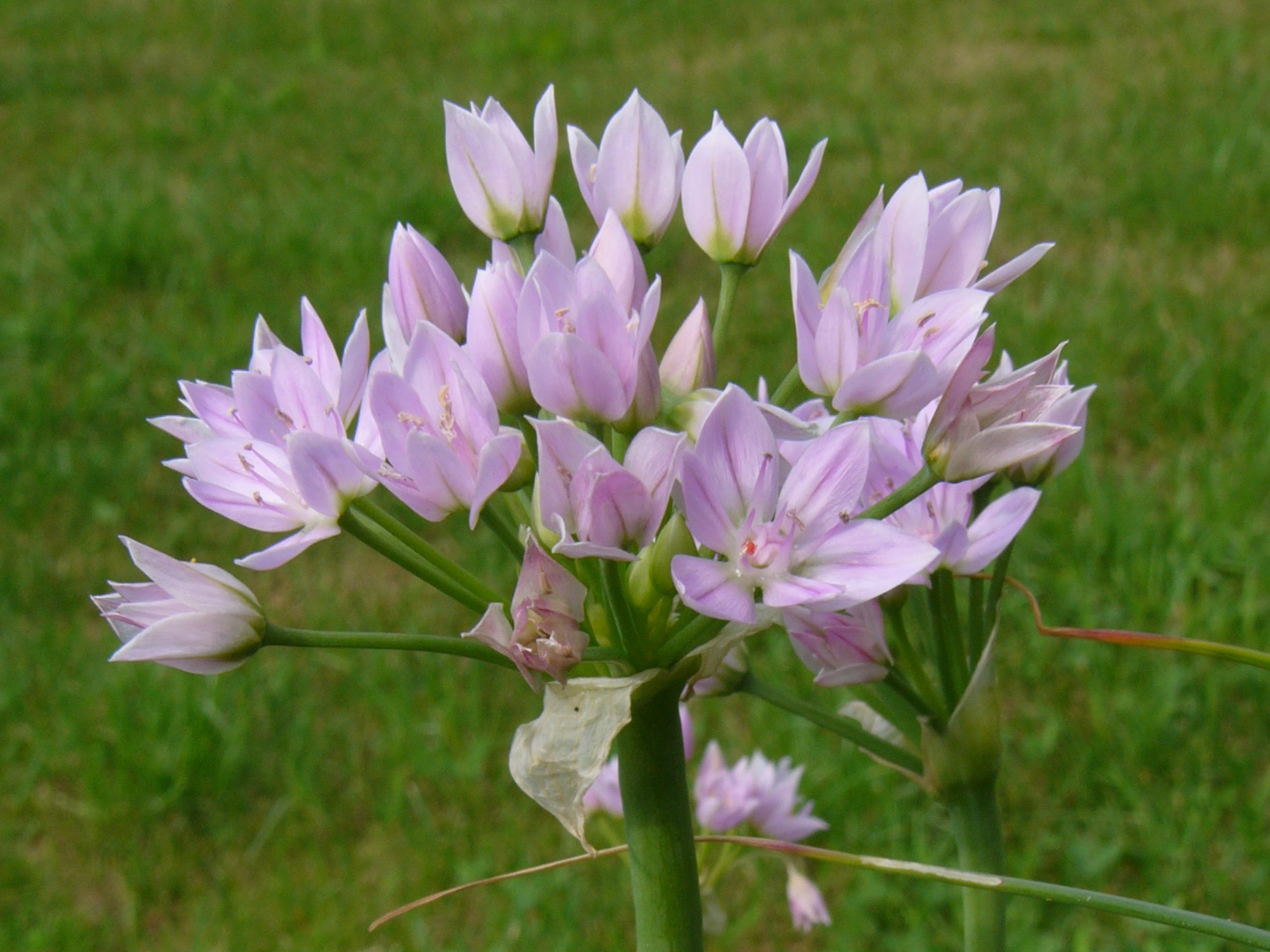
Molium: A. roseum

  - Allium moly L.
  - Allium neapolitanum Cirillo (Syn. Allium sieberianum Schult. & Schult.f.) white garlic
  - Allium roseum L. Type
  - Allium subhirsutum L. (Syn. Allium ciliatum Cirillo)
  - Allium zebdanense Boiss. & Noë

====== Section Narkissoprason ======
- Section Narkissoprason Hermann

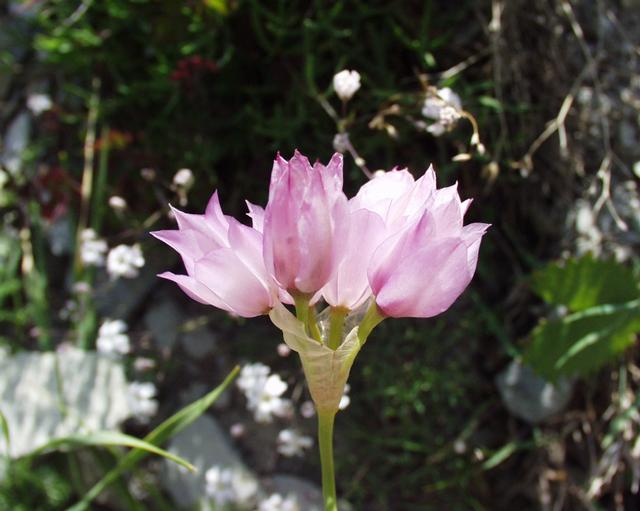
Narkissoprason: A. narcissiflorum

  - Allium insubricum Boiss. & Reut.
  - Allium narcissiflorum Vill. (Syn.: Allium pedemontanum Willd.) Type

====== Other ======
- Section Rhophetoprason Traub
  - Allium glandulosum Link & Otto
- Section Rhynchocarpum Brullo
  - Allium ruhmerianum Aschers.
- Section Triptera Kamelin et Seisums
  - Allium tripterum Nasir

==== Second evolutionary line ====
Nearly all the species in this lineage of five subgenera are accounted for by subgenus Melanocrommyum, which is most closely associated with subgenera Vvedenskya and Porphyroprason, phylogenetically. These three genera are late-branching whereas the remaining two subgenera, Caloscordum and Anguinum, are early-branching. Of the five subgenera, the large Melanocrommymum and the oligo- or monotypic Caloscordum, Vvedenskya and Porphyroprason are bulbous and the remaining small subgenus Anguinum is rhizomatous.

===== Subgenus Caloscordum =====
East Asia

Sections

  - Section Caloscordum (Herb.) Baker 3 spp.
    - Allium neriniflorum (Herb.) Baker Type
    - Allium tubiflorum Rendle

===== Subgenus Anguinum =====
Two distinct distributions: 1. Eurasian-American (A. victorialis alliance, including A. tricoccum) 2. East Asia (A. prattii, A. ovalifolium)

Sections

  - Section Anguinum G.Don ex Koch. 12 spp.
    - Allium microdictyon Prokh.
    - Allium ochotense Prokh.
    - Allium ovalifolium Hand.-Mazz.
    - Allium prattii C.H.Wright
    - Allium tricoccum Aiton (Syn.: Allium burdickii (Hanes) A.G.Jones) wild leek, ramp
    - Allium victorialis L. Type

===== Subgenus Porphyroprason =====
Sections

  - Section Porphyroprason Ekberg 1 sp.
    - Allium oreophilum C.A.Mey. (Syn. Allium ostrowskianum Regel)

===== Subgenus Vvedenskya =====
Sections

  - Section Vvedenskya Kamelin 1 sp.
    - Allium kujukense Vved.

===== Subgenus Melanocrommyum =====
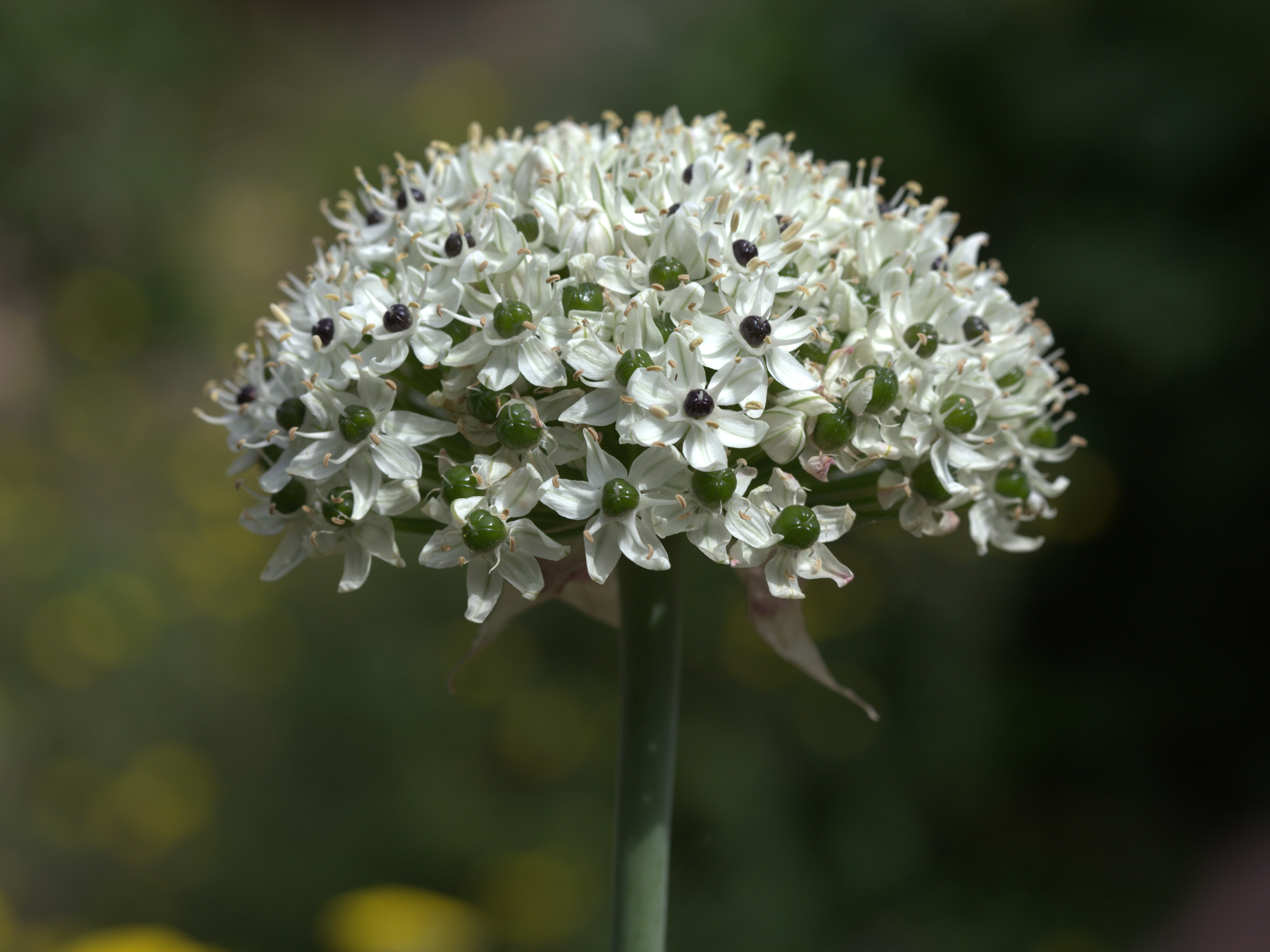
Type species: Allium nigrum

This Eurasian subgenus, the second largest, is complex and has had a confusing taxonomic history and is extremely diverse, morphologically. It is distributed from the Mediterranean to the Near and Middle East, to north-western China and Pakistan in the east, and southern Siberia in the north. The centre of diversity is Central Asia where it evolved, but its ancestry is located in East Asia. The 2006 classification of Fritsch and colleagues included 150 species but this has continued to grow. An extensive molecular based study in 2010 confirmed its monophyly but showed that the traditional sections were either para- or polyphyletic. On the other hand, a number of monophyletic subgroups were recognised, with about 40 clades, although their exact relationships remained not fully resolved. Consequently, traditional sections required considerable re-alignment. Eventually 160 species and subspecies were recognised in 20 sections and 22 subsections.

Description: The subgenus is characterised by true tunicated bulbs, annual roots, leaves that are mostly broad and flat with subterranean sheath parts that are barely visible above the ground, scapes that are strong and most often strictly upright and of varying length, and large, fasciculate to globular inflorescences. The latter are composed of many moderately small to large, often star-like, flowers, and some of which have a sweet or noticeable odor.

History: Early (prior to 1950) classifications of Allium included many of the members of this subgenus within the bulbous section, Mollium based on morphological characteristics. Mollium was later raised to subgenus level (and then again reduced to a section of Amerallium after transferring many species to Melanocrommyum. The subgenus was then divided into sections in 1969. Molecular methods in the 1990s confirmed the identity of Melanocrommyum as a distinct monophyletic group, together with the presence of several subgroups, but the deeper relationships remained inconsistent.

Subdivision: Subdivision of the subgenus was first proposed by Wendelbo in 1966, proposing section Regeloprason Wendelbo, followed in 1969 by Melanocrommyum Webb & Berthel., Kaloprason K. Koch, Acanthoprason Wendelbo, Megaloprason Wendelbo, and Thaumasioprason Wendelbo. Kamelin (1973) provided an alternative arrangement of sections, which was supplanted by the Gatersleben Allium Group classification (1992) which used a broad range of variables.

The use of molecular markers to develop phylogeny began in the 1990s and showed that the subgenus was a well separated taxon with a number of subgeneric groupings. Friesen and colleagues (2006) carried out an extensive molecular phylogenetic study resulting in a taxonomy based on 15 sections. These were then further subdivided into five of the sections to create 17 subsections. While Melanocrommyum itself appeared monophyletic, most of the sections were either para- or polyphyletic, favouring the formation of a larger number of smaller subgroups. In their study there were a number of larger sections with 15–35 species, Acmopetala, Megaloprason, Regeloprason, Kaloprason, and Acanthoprason. The remaining sections are either oligogotypic with 2–8 species (Compactoprason, Pseudoprason, Miniprason, Brevicaule, Thaumasioprason, Verticillata) or monotypic (Acaule, Aroidea, Popovia).

In a more focused study in 2010 this was expanded to 20 sections and 22 subsections, or in some cases, e.g. section Melanocrommyum (type: A. nigrum) into nine alliances and Acanthoprason into seven. This section is the most diverse one within the subgenus in which subgroups differ according to the relationships of the lengths of leaves and scapes (leaves shorter, equal or longer than scapes) and inflorescences (fasciculate, umbellate or subglobose). The increased number of sections resulted from the splitting of some of the earlier sections, such as Acmopetala. The two species in the resulting section Longibidentata are sister to all the remaining sections (core clade). This section, together with another new section, Decipientia form the basal clade. Although Li et al. (2010) included three sections, their study was confined to species endemic to China.

Uses: The subgenus also contains many species grown as ornamentals, such as A. giganteum, A. cristophii, A. schubertii, A. aflatunense, A. atropurpureum, A. nigrum and A. karataviense. These species are predominantly from Southwestern and Central Asia, where they are used for both culinary and medicinal purposes. The latter usage is associated with the presence of cysteine sulfoxides and also radical scavenger activity, although many members of the subgenus possess less of these compounds and lack the distinctive taste and smell of garlic and onion, their properties appear to be associated with dithiodipyrroles and sulfur-pyridins. These substances also occur in the ornamental species, that were introduced into European and North American gardens in the early 19th century, and now are represented by an increasing number of named cultivars and hybrids. Cysteine sulfoxides are also largely responsible for the flavour and spicy taste of these species, predominantly the isomeric cysteine derivatives alliin and isoalliin.

15 sections

- Section Acanthoprason Type A. akaka
- Section Acaule Type A. hexaceras
- Section Acmopetala Type A. backhousianum
  - 7 subsections
- Section Aroidea Type A. aroides
- Section Asteroprason Type A. elburzense
  - 2 subsections
- Section Brevicaule Type A. sergii
- Section Compactoprason Type A. giganteum
  - 3 subsections
- Section Decipientia Type A. decipiens
- Section Kaloprason Type A. caspium
  - 3 subsections
- Section Longibidentata Type A. fetisowii
- Section Megaloprason Type A. rosenbachianum
  - 4 subsections
- Section Melanocrommyum Type A. nigrum
- Section Miniprason Type A. karataviense
- Section Popovia Type A. gypsaceum
- Section Procerallium Type Allium stipitatum
  - 2 subsections
- Section Pseudoprason Type A. koelzii
- Section Regeloprason Type A. regelii
  - 3 subsections
- Section Stellata Type A. taeniopetalum
- Section Thaumasioprason Type A. mirum
- Section Verticillata Type A. verticillatum

Sections

- Section Acanthoprason Wendelbo

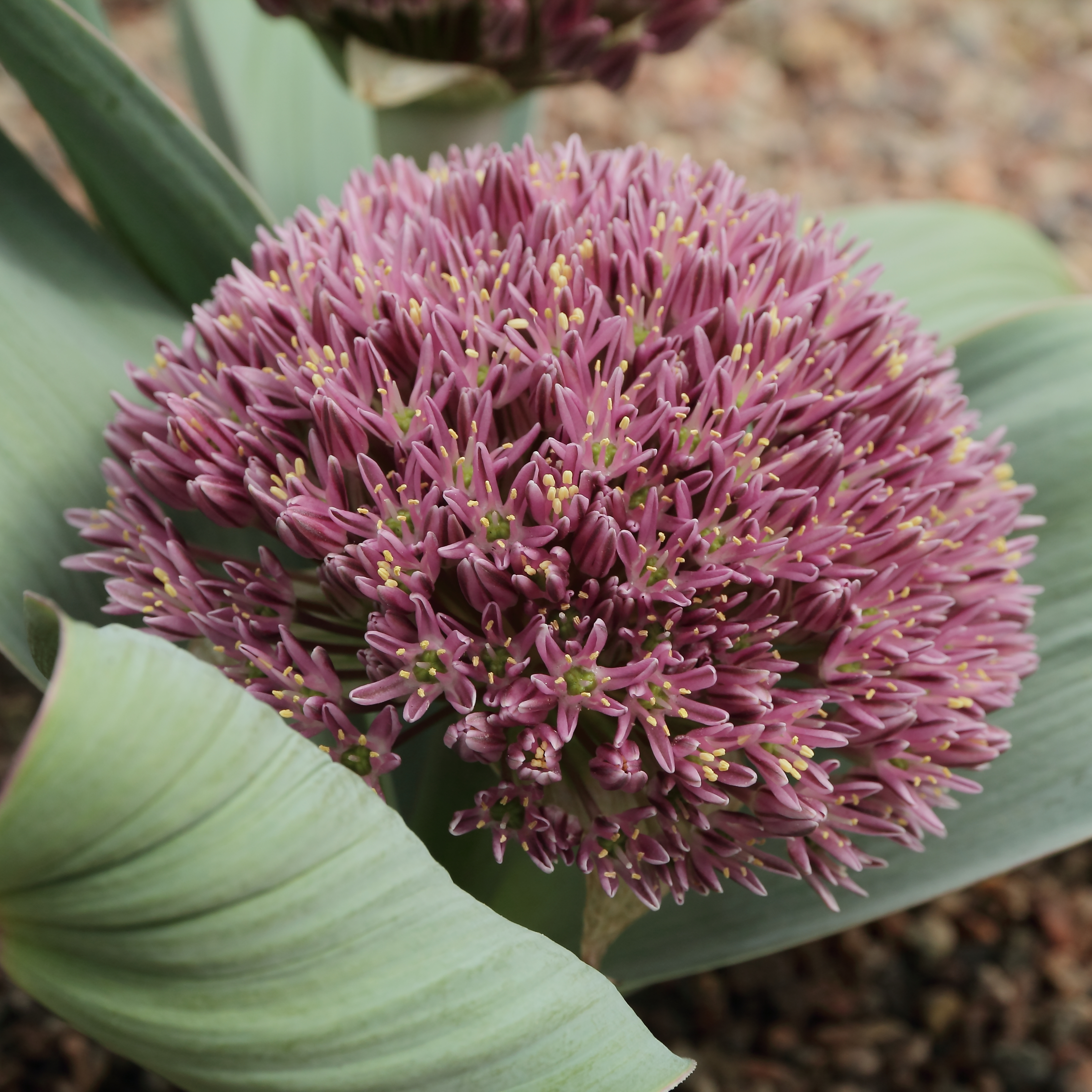
Acanthoprason: A. akaka

  - Allium akaka alliance
    - Allium akaka S.G.Gmel. ex Schult. & Schult. f. Type
  - Allium austroiranicum alliance
    - Allium austroiranicum R.M. Fritsch
  - Allium derderianum alliance
    - Allium breviscapum Stapf
    - Allium derderianum Regel
  - Allium haemanthoides alliance
    - Allium haemanthoides Boiss. & Reut. ex Regel s. str.
    - Allium zagricum R. M. Fritsch
  - Allium materculae alliance
    - Allium graveolens (R.M.Fritsch) R.M.Fritsch
    - Allium materculae Bordz.
  - Allium minutiflorum alliance
    - Allium hamedanense R. M. Fritsch
    - Allium minutiflorum Regel
  - Allium ubipetrense alliance
    - Allium ubipetrense R. M. Fritsch (Syn. Allium haemanthoides var. lanceolatum Boiss)
- Section Acaule R.M.Fritsch
  - Allium hexaceras Vved.
- Section Acmopetala R.M.Fritsch
  - Subsection Acmopetala R. M. Fritsch
    - Allium aflatunense B.Fedtsch. non hort. flowering onion
    - Allium backhousianum Regel (Syn. Allium gulczense O. Fedtsch.) Type (section and subsection)
  - Subsection Albidiflora R. M. Fritsch
    - Allium saposhnikovii Nikitina (Syn. Allium collis-magni Kamelin)
  - Subsection Durovaginata R. M. Fritsch
    - Allium costatovaginatum Kamelin & Levichev Type
    - Allium severtzovioides R.M. Fritsch
  - Subsection Inornatae R. M. Fritsch
    - Allium sewerzowii Regel Type
    - Allium tashkenticum F. O. Khass. & R. M. Fritsch (Syn. Allium collis-magni auct. non Kamelin)
  - Subsection Pharmakoprason R. M. Fritsch
    - Allium tschimganicum B.Fedtsch. (Syn. Allium motor Kamelin & Levichev)
- Section Aroidea Khass. & R.M.Fritsch
  - Allium aroides Vved. et Popov
- Section Asteroprason R. M. Fritsch
  - Subsect Asteroprason R. M. Fritsch
    - Allium elburzense Wendelbo Type (section and subsection)
    - Allium helicophyllum Vved.
    - Allium monophyllum Vved.
  - Subsection Christophiana T Scholok.
    - Allium cristophii Trautv. (Syn. Allium albopilosum C.H.Wright, Allium walteri Regel, Allium bodeanum Regel nom. rej., Allium christophii Trautv. orth. var.) Type

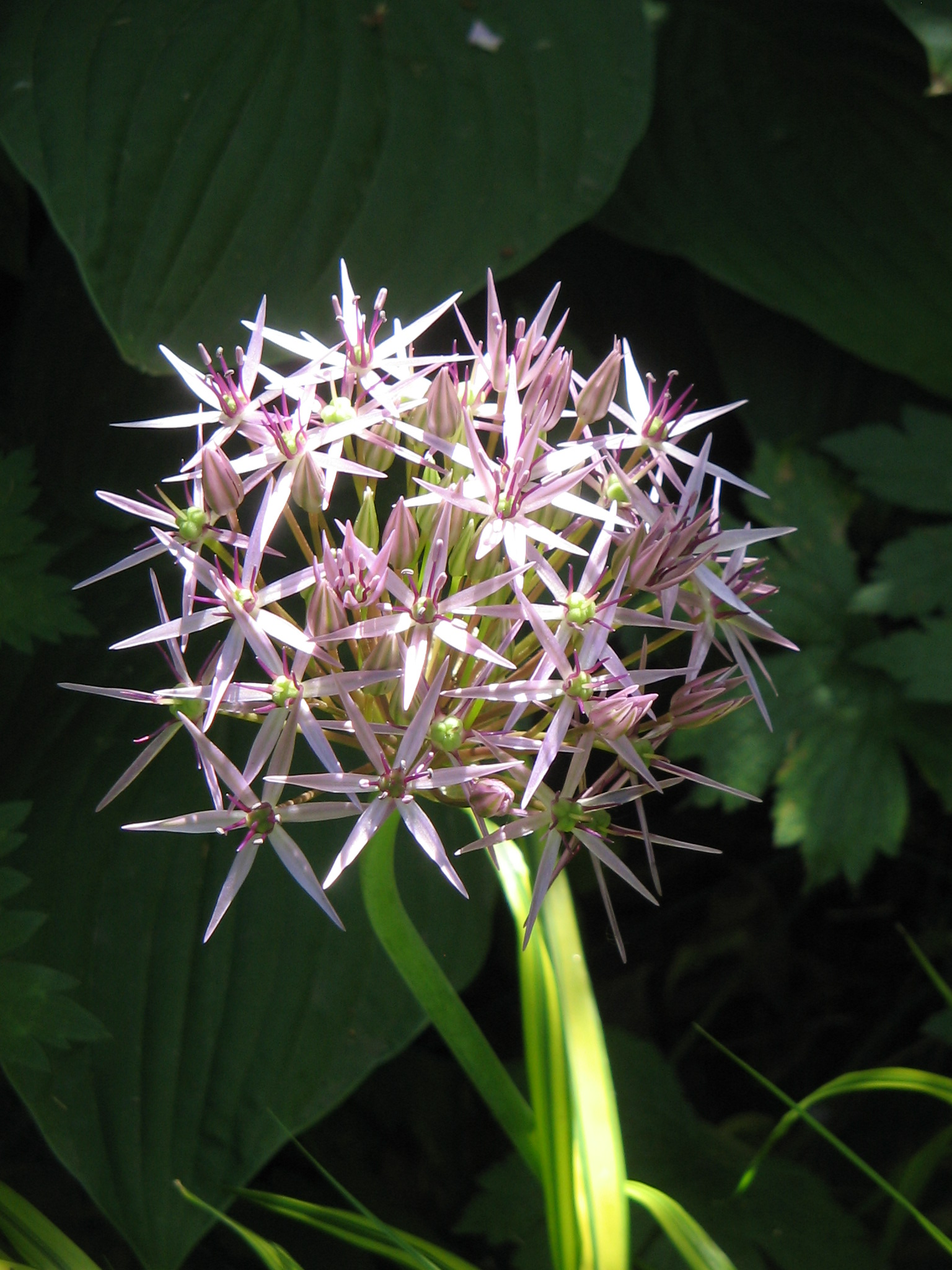
Kaloprason: A. cristophii

    - Allium ellisii Hook.f
- Section Brevicaule R.M.Fritsch
  - Allium badakhshanicum Wendelbo
  - Allium chitralicum Wang et Tang s. str. (Syn. Allium pauli Vved.)
  - Allium sergii Vved. Type
- Section Compactoprason R.M.Fritsch

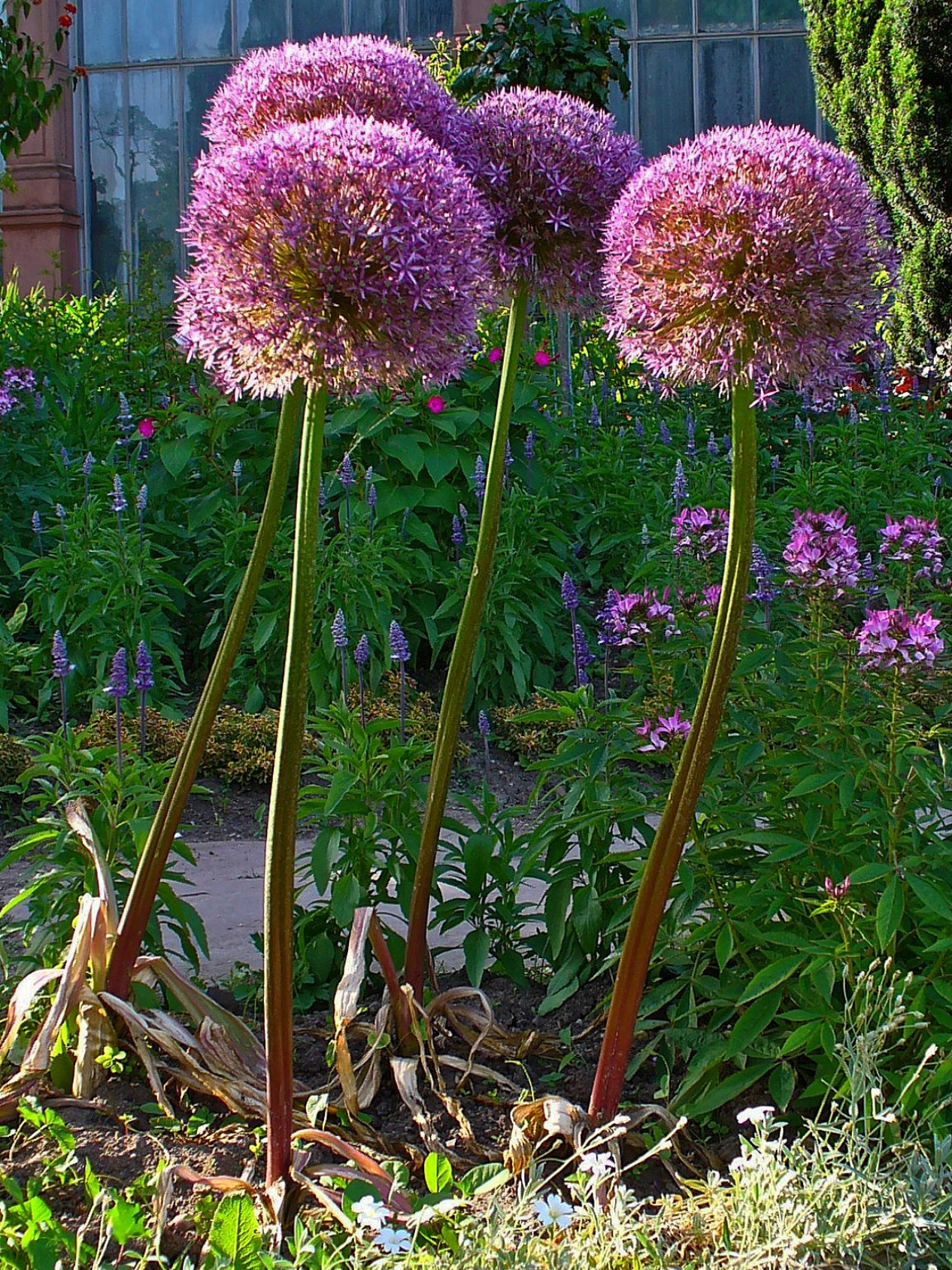
Compactoprason: A. giganteum

  - Subsection Erectopetala F. O. K Hass.
    - Allium giganteum Regel Type (section and subsection) giant onion
    - Allium macleanii Baker (Syn. Allium elatum Regel)
  - Subsection Komaroviana F. O. Khass. & R. M. Fritsch
    - Allium komarowii Lipsky
  - Subsection Spiralopetala F. O. Khass. & R. M. Fritsch
    - Allium majus Vved.
- Section Decipientia (O Melczuk) R.M.Fritsch
  - Allium chelotum Wendelbo
  - Allium decipiens Fisch. ex Schult. & Schult. f. Type
  - Allium grande Lipsky
  - Allium roborowskianum Regel
  - Allium robustum Kar.&Kir.
  - Allium sinkiangense F.T. Wang & Y.C. Tang
  - Allium tulipifolium Ledeb.
  - Allium viridulum Ledeb.
- Section Kaloprason C.Koch
  - Subsection Kaloprason (K. Koch) Kamelin s. str.
    - Allium caspium (Pall.) M. Bieb. Type (section and subsection)
    - Allium bucharicum Regel
  - Subsection Ligulifolia R. M. Fritsch
    - Allium alexeianum Regel s. str.
    - Allium hindukuschense Kamelin & Seisums
  - Subsect Schubertia Kamelin
    - Allium schubertii Zucc.
- Section Longibidentata (R.M.Fritsch) R.M.Fritsch
  - Allium fetisowii Regel (Syn. Allium simile Regel) Type
  - Allium chychkanense R. M. Fritsch
- Section Megaloprason Wendelbo
  - Subsection Humilicognata R. M. Fritsch
    - Allium assadii Seisums (Syn. Allium brachyscapum sensu Wendelbo)
    - Allium brachyscapum Vved. Type
    - Allium scotostemon Wendelbo
  - Subsection Keratoprason R. M. Fritsch
    - Allium sarawschanicum Regel (Syn. Allium pseudozeravschanicum Popov & Vved. ex B. Fedtsch & Popov)
  - Subsection Megaloprason R. M. Fritsch
    - Allium insufficiens Vved.
    - Allium rosenbachianum Regel Type (section and subsection)
  - Subsection Spiralitunicata R. M. Fritsch
    - Allium fibriferum Wendelbo
    - Allium suworowii Regel Type
- Section Melanocrommyum Webb & Berthel. s.s.

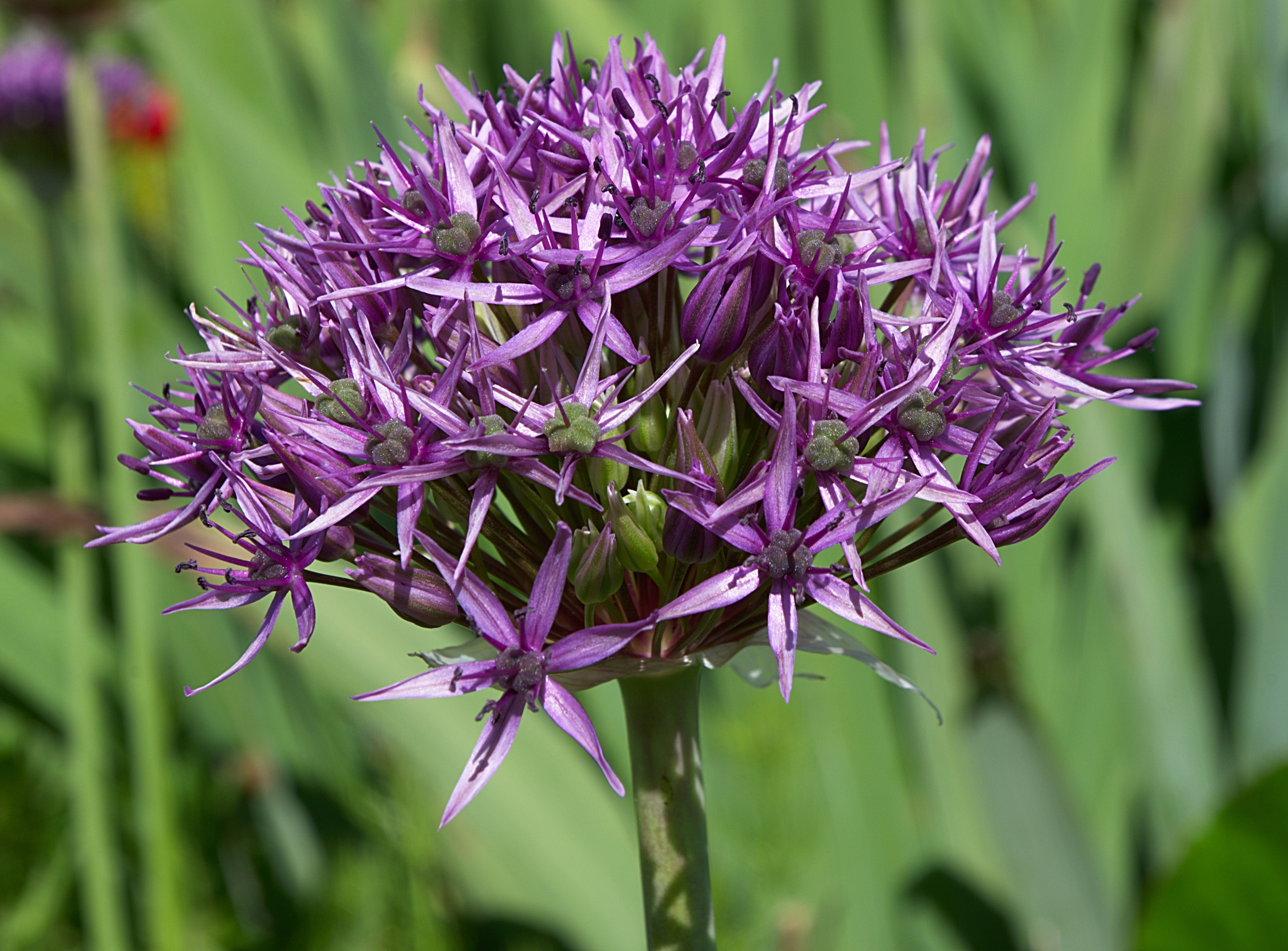
Melanocrommyum: A. atropurpureum

  - Allium asclepiadeum alliance
    - Allium asclepiadeum Bornm.
    - Allium chrysantherum Boiss.& Reut. (Syn. Allium reflexum Boiss.& Reut. non F. Dietr.)
    - Allium eginense Freyn
    - Allium kharputense Freyn & Sint.
    - Allium nemrutdaghense Kit Tan & Sorger
    - Allium olivieri Boiss.
    - Allium saralicum R. M. Fritsch
    - Allium shatakiense Rech.f.
    - Allium stenopetalum Boiss. & Kotschy
    - Allium urmiense Kamelin & Seisums
  - Allium bisotunense alliance
    - Allium bisotunense R. M. Fritsch
  - Allium cardiostemon alliance
    - Allium cardiostemon Fisch. & C.A.Mey. (Syn. Allium atriphoeniceum Bornm., Allium nabelekii Kamelin & Seisums, Allium trilophostemon Bornm.
    - Allium mariae Bordz.
  - Allium colchicifolium alliance
    - Allium colchicifolium Boiss.
    - Allium libani Boiss. Lebanese onion
  - Allium multibulbosum alliance
    - Allium atropurpureum Waldst. & Kit.
    - Allium cyrilli Ten.
    - Allium multibulbosum Jacq. (Syn. Allium nigrum auct. non L.)
  - Allium nigrum alliance
    - Allium nigrum L. (Syn. Allium afrum (Zuccagni) Kunth, Allium magicum L., nom. rej., Allium bauerianum Baker) Type black garlic
    - Allium struzlianum Ogan.
  - Allium noëanum alliance
    - Allium karamanoglui Koyuncu & Kollmann
    - Allium noëanum Reut. ex Regel (Syn. Allium dilutum Stapf, Allium jenischianum Regel)
  - Allium orientale alliance
    - Allium aschersonianum Barbey
    - Allium dumetorum Feinbrun & Szel.
    - Allium orientale Boiss.
    - Allium tel-avivense Eig
    - Allium tubergenii Freyn
  - Allium rothii alliance
    - Allium rothii Zucc.
    - Allium vinicolor Wendelbo
- Section Miniprason R.M.Fritsch monotypic

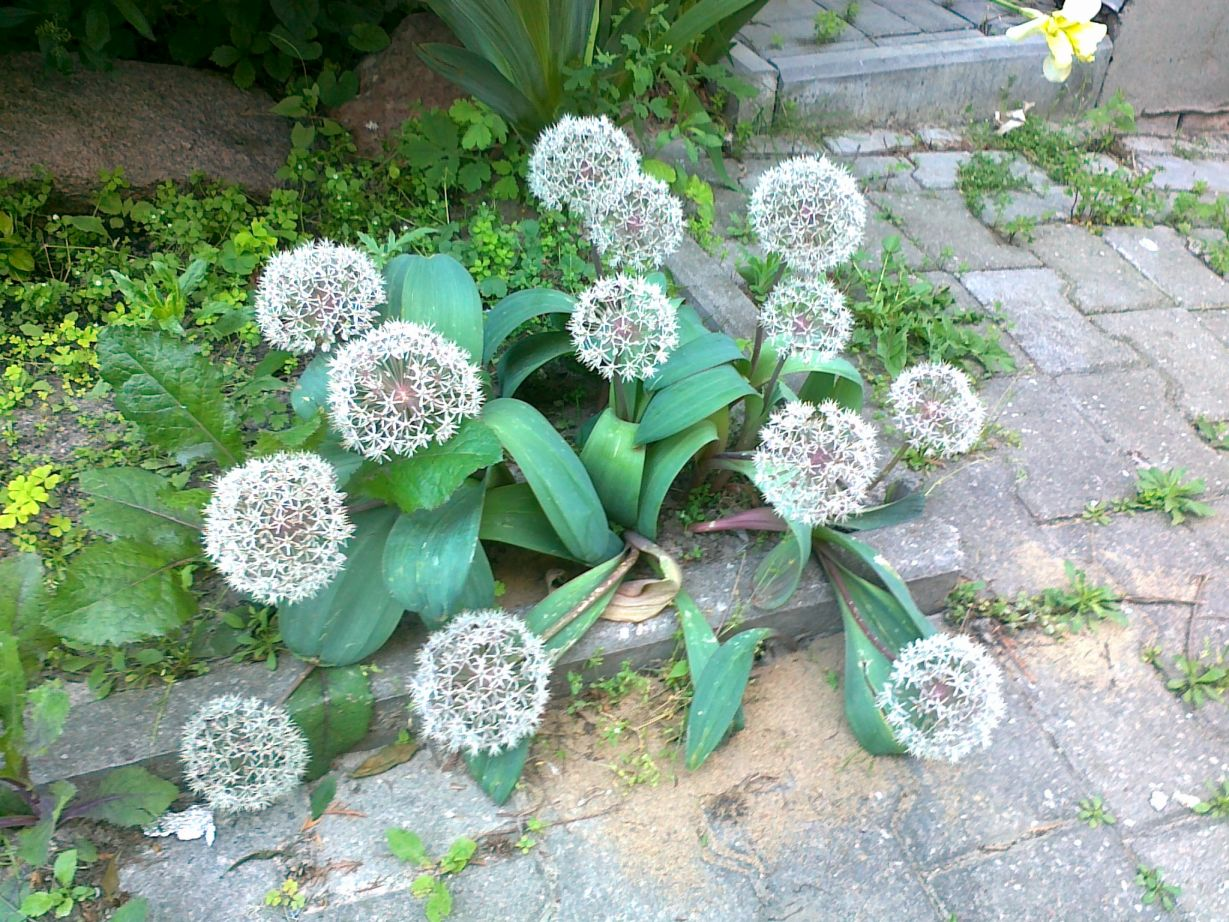
Miniprason: A. karataviense

  - Allium karataviense Regel (Syn. Allium cabulicum Baker, Allium singulifolium Rech. f.; ? incl. subsp. henrikii Ruksans)
- Section Popovia Khass. & R.M.Fritsch
  - Allium gypsaceum Popov et Vved.
- Section Procerallium R. M. Fritsch
  - Subsection Elatae R. M. Fritsch
    - Allium stipitatum Regel Type (subsection and section) Persian shallot
    - Allium altissimum Regel
  - Subsection Costatae R. M. Fritsch
    - Allium hollandicum R. M. Fritsch (Syn. Allium aflatunense hort. non B. Fedtsch.) flowering onion
    - Allium jesdianum Boiss. & Buhse Type
    - Allium rosenorum R.M. Fritsch (Syn. Allium rosenbachianum auct. non Regel)
- Section Pseudoprason (Wendelbo) K.Persson & Wendelbo
  - Allium hooshidaryae Mashayekhi, Zarre & R.M.Fritsch
  - Allium koelzii (Wendelbo) K.Perss. et Wendelbo Type
- Section Regeloprason Wendelbo

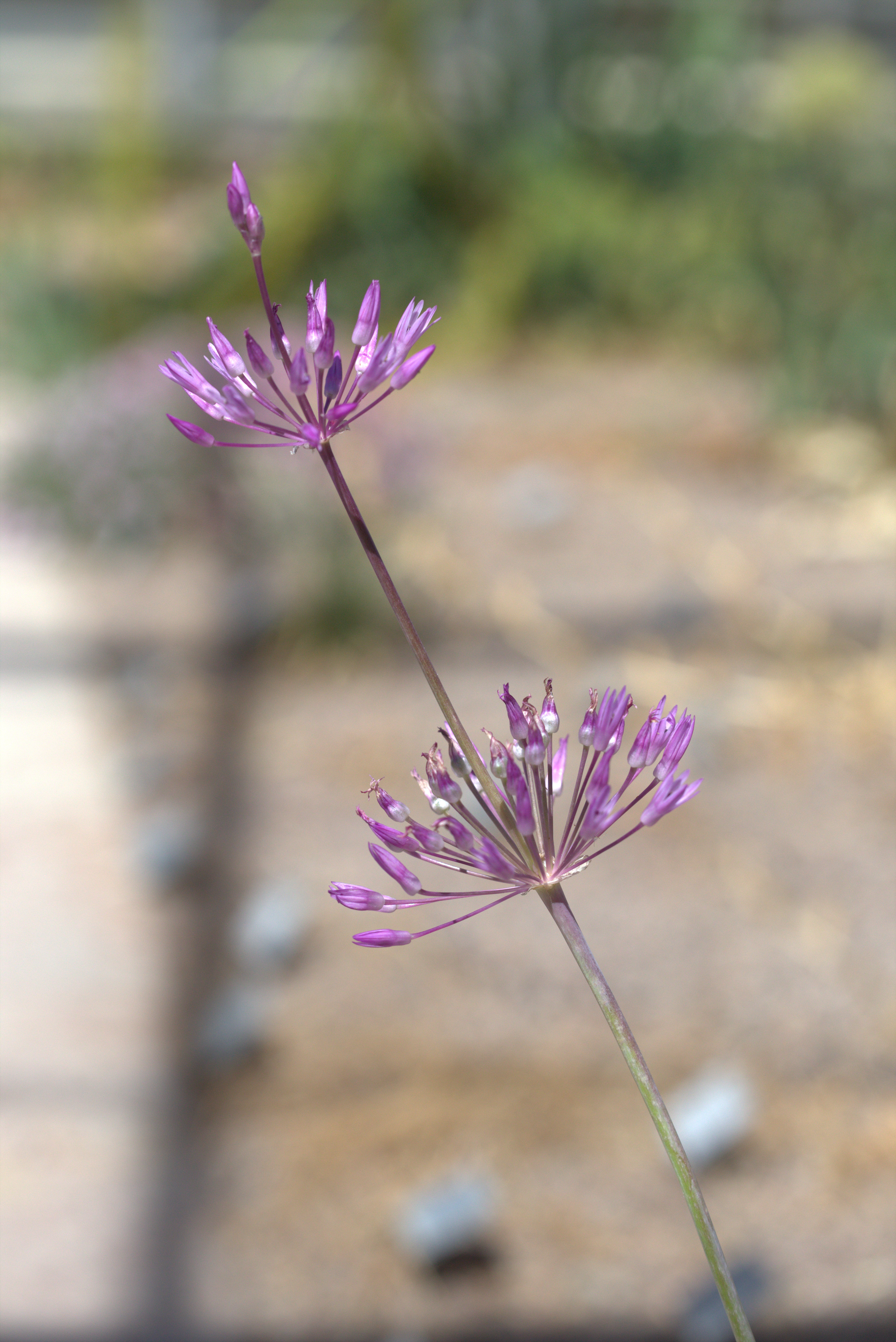
Regeloprason: A. regelii

  - Subsection Diffusoumbellata R. M. Fritsch
    - Allium balkhanicum (R. M. Fritsch & F.O.Khass.) R. M. Fritsch
    - Allium cathodicarpum Wendelbo
    - Allium cupuliferum Regel Type
    - Allium iliense Regel
    - Allium isakulii R. M. Fritsch & F.O.Khass. (Syn. Allium cupuliferum sensu Kamelin subsp. nuratense Kamelin)
    - Allium subkopetdagense (R. M. Fritsch & F.O. Khass.) R. M. Fritsch
  - Subsection Odoratae R. M. Fritsch
    - Allium chodsha-bakirganicum Gaffarov & Turakulov
    - Allium darwasicum Regel Type
    - Allium hissaricum Vved.
    - Allium intradarvazicum R. M. Fritsch*** Allium lipskyanum Vved.
    - Allium pseudowinklerianum R. M. Fritsch & F.O. Khass
    - Allium sochense R. M. Fritsch & U. Turakulov
    - Allium winklerianum Regel
  - Subsection Regeloprason (Wendelbo) Kamelin
    - Allium regelii Trautv. Type
    - Allium victoris Vved.
- Section Stellata (F.O. Khass. & R.M. Fritsch) R.M. Fritsch
  - Allium taeniopetalum Popov & Vved. (Syn.: Allium baschkyzylsaicum Krassovsk., Allium mogoltavicum Vved.)
- Section Thaumasioprason Wendelbo
  - Allium caroli-henrici Wendelbo
  - Allium cucullatum Wendelbo
  - Allium khozratense R. M. Fritsch
  - Allium mirum Wendelbo Type
- Section Verticillata Kamelin
  - Allium verticillatum Regel

==== Third evolutionary line ====
The third evolutionary line contains the most number of subgenera (seven) and also the largest subgenus of the genus Allium, subgenus Allium which includes the type species of the genus, Allium sativum. This subgenus also contains the majority of the species in the line. Within the lineage the phylogeny is complex. Two small subgenera Butomissa and Cyathophora form a sister clade to the remaining five subgenera, with Butomissa as the first branching group. Amongst the remaining five subgenera, Rhizirideum forms a medium-sized subgenus that is the sister to the other four larger subgenera. However, they may not be monophyletic. Of the seven subgenera, the large subgenus Allium represents the bulbous element.

===== Subgenus Butomissa =====
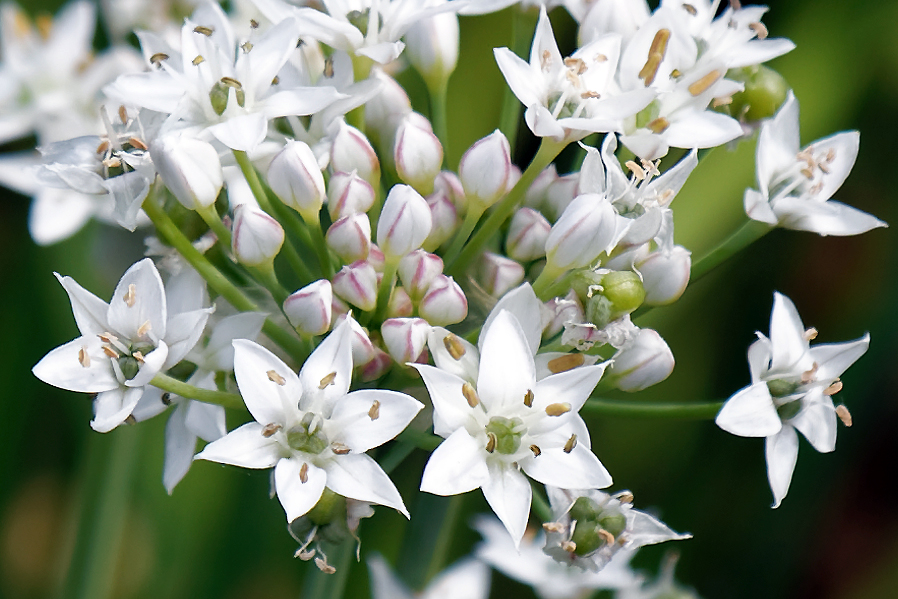
Allium tuberosum

2 sections

- Section Austromontana Type A. oreoprasum
- Section Butomissa Type A. ramosum

Sections

- Section Austromontana N.Friesen

Mountains from eastern to central Asia up to the borderline of the eastern Mediterranean

  - Allium gilgiticum Wang & Tang
  - Allium oreoprasum Schrenk Type
- Section Butomissa (Salisb.) Kamelin

Siberian–Mongolian–North Chinese steppes

  - Allium ramosum L. (Syn. Allium odorum L., Allium tataricum L. f., Allium lancipetalum Y.P.Hsu, Allium potaninii Regel, Allium weichanicum Palibin) Type
  - Allium tuberosum Rottler ex Spreng Chinese chives

===== Subgenus Cyathophora =====
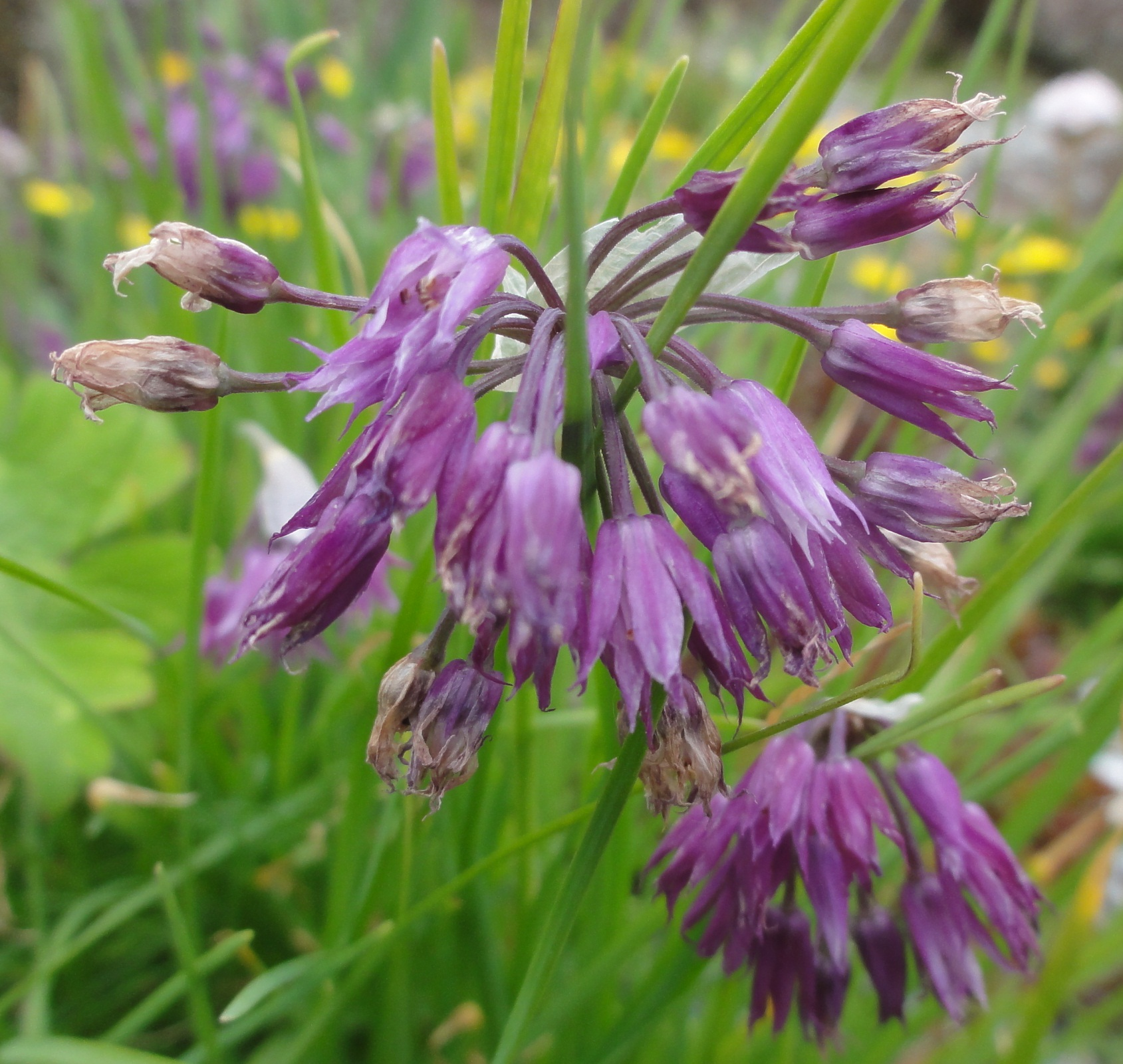
Type species: Allium cyathophorum

Asia (Tibet and the Himalayas)

3 sections

- Section Coleoblastus Type A. mairei
- Section Cyathophora Type A. cyathophorum
- Section Milula Type A. spicatum

Sections

- Section Coleoblastus Ekberg
  - Allium auriculatum Kunth
  - Allium mairei H.Lév. (Syn. Allium yunnanense Diels) Type
- Section Cyathophora R.M.Fritsch
  - Allium cyathophorum Bureau & Franch
- Section Milula (Prain) Friesen
  - Allium spicatum (Prain) N.Friesen

===== Subgenus Rhizirideum =====
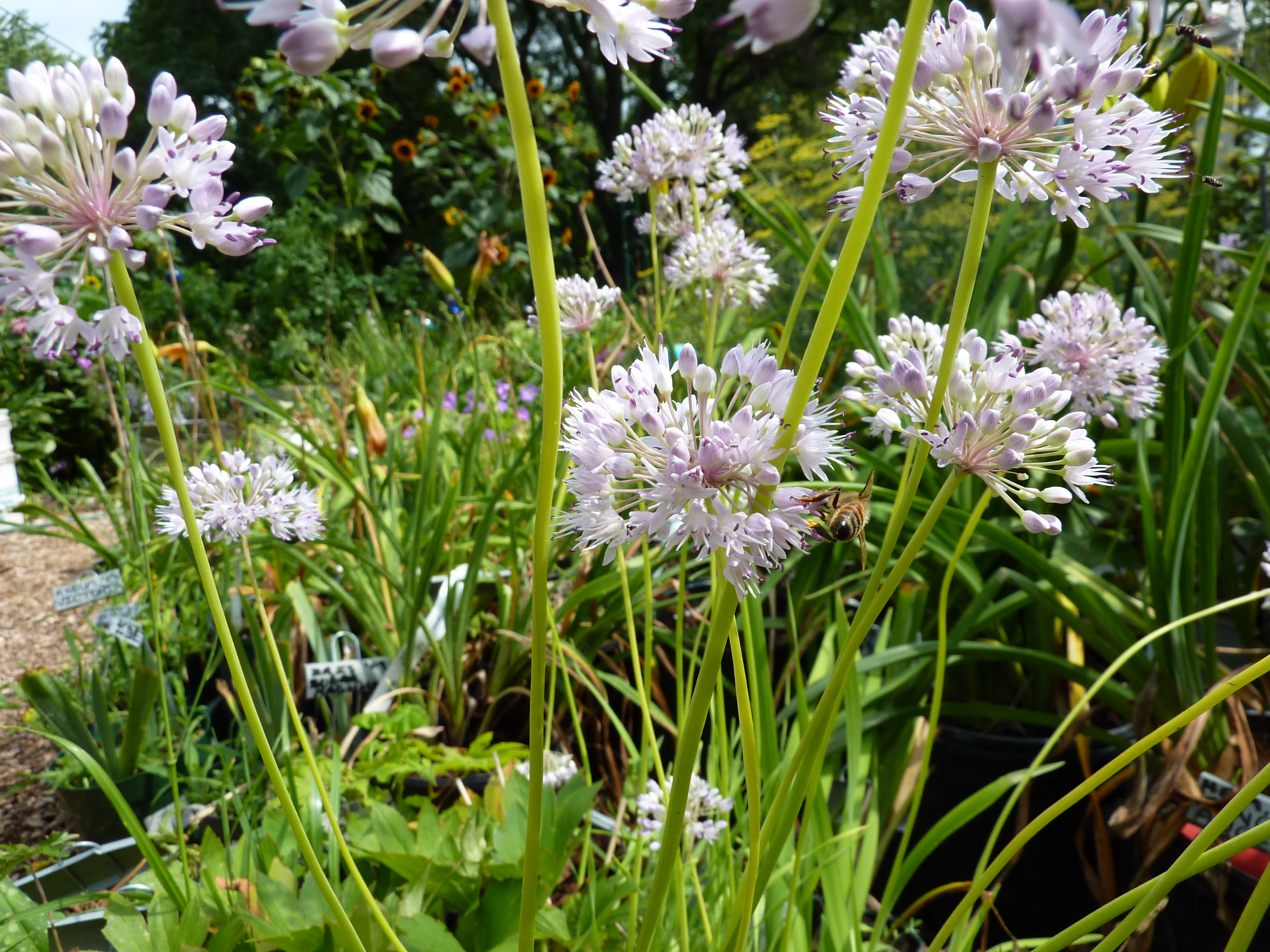
Type species: Allium senescens

~ 37 species. Eurasian steppes, with greatest diversity in southern Siberia and Mongolia. Only a few species distributed in Europe, with Portugal as most western point. Some species occur also in Korea and far eastern Russia, and one in Japan.

5 sections

- Section Caespitosoprason Type A. polyrhizum
- Section Eduardia Type A. eduardii
- Section Rhizirideum Type A. senescens
- Section Rhizomatosa Type A. caespitosum
- Section Tenuissima Type A. tenuissimum

Sections

- Section Caespitosoprason N.Friesen
  - Allium bidentatum Fisch. ex Prokh.
  - Allium mongolicum Regel
  - Allium polyrhizum Turcz. ex Regel Type
  - Allium przewalskianum Regel
  - Allium subangulatum Regel
- Section Eduardia N.Friesen
  - Allium eduardii Stearn
- Section Rhizirideum G.Don ex Koch
  - Allium albidum Fisch. ex M.Bieb.
  - Allium angulosum L. mouse garlic
  - Allium austrosibiricum N.Friesen
  - Allium burjaticum N.Friesen
  - Allium denudatum Redouté (Syn. Allium albidum Fisch. ex M.Bieb.)
  - Allium lusitanicum Lam. (Syn. Allium fallax Schult. & Schult. f., Allium montanum F.W.Schmidt)
  - Allium minus S.Yu, W.Lee & S.Lee
  - Allium nutans L.
  - Allium prostratum Trevir.
  - Allium pseudosenescens H.J.Choi & B.U.Oh
  - Allium rubens Schrad. ex Willd.
  - Allium senescens L. (Syn. Allium baicalense Willd., Allium glaucum Schrad. ex Poir.) Type
  - Allium spirale Willd.
  - Allium spurium G.Don (Syn. Allium dauricum N.Friesen, Allium saxicola Kitag.)
  - Allium stellerianum Willd.
- Section Rhizomatosa Egor.
  - Allium caespitosum Siev.
- Section Tenuissima (Tzag.) Hanelt
  - Allium anisopodium Ledeb.
  - Allium tenuissimum L. Type
  - Allium vodopjanovae N.Friesen

===== Subgenus Allium =====
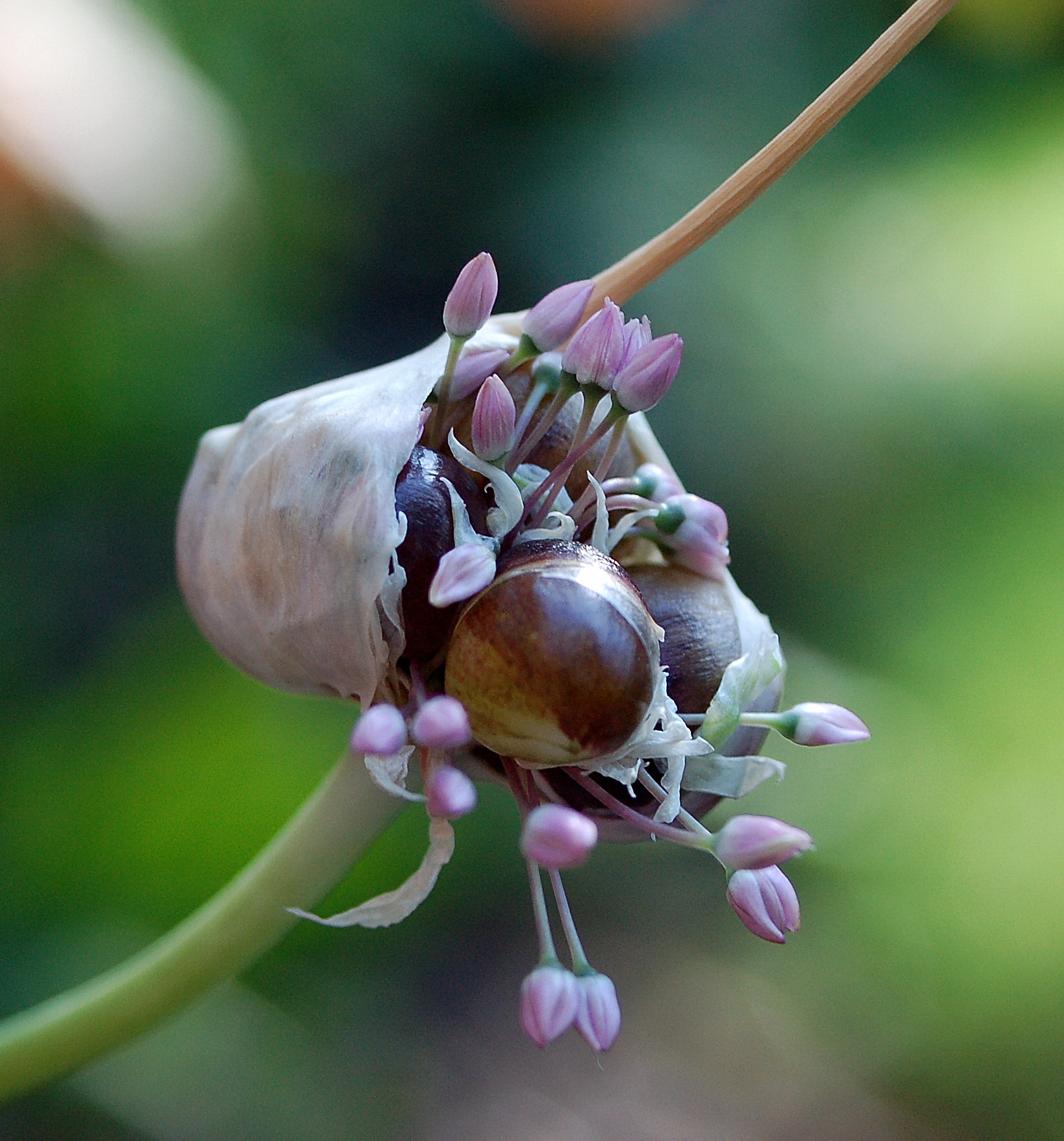
Type species: Allium sativum

Subgenus Allium, the youngest of the subgenera, is predominantly Mediterranean but its distribution extends east towards Central Asia. This very large subgenus is divided into 15 - 16 sections (Note: Friesen et al. include section Costulatae within section Allium, while others treat it separately) and demonstrates two main groups. One has been referred to as classical Allium with tripartite inner filaments and only one thick storage cataphyll. The other is more diverse morphologically reflected in less closely related sections. A number of sections appear to be non-monophyletic, including Avulsea, Pallasia, Brevispatha and Kopetdagia. It includes both ornamentals, such as A. sphaerocephalon, A. caeruleum, A. carinatum and A. flavum as well as food crops such as A. sativum and A. ampeloprasum.

16 Sections

- Section Allium Type A. sativum
- Section Avulsea Type A. rubellum
- Section Brevidentia Type A. brevidens
- Section Brevispatha Type A. parciflorum
- Section Caerulea Type A. caeruleum
- Section Codonoprasum Type A. oleraceum
- Section Costulatae Type A. filidens
- Section Crystallina Type A. crystallinum
- Section Eremoprasum Type A. sabulosum
- Section Kopetdagia Type A. kopedeganse
- Section Longivaginata Type A. longivaginatum
- Section Minuta Type A. minutum
- Section Mediasia Type A. turkestanicum
- Section Multicaulea Type A. lehmannianum
- Section Pallasia Type A. pallasii
- Section Spathulata Type A. spathulatum

Sections

====== Section Allium ======
This is the largest section with about 114 species, a number of which are economically important, such as A. sativum (garlic) and A. ampeloprasum (leek). This section also expresses frequent polyploidy and contains a number of species whose boundaries have been difficult to establish, notably A. ampeloprasum which includes a number of subspecies and varieties, as well as synonymous species, which have been labelled the "A. ampeloprasum complex". Horticulturally, it is represented by at least four groups, including leeks, whose exact ancestry has been considered uncertain. In the molecular phylogenetic study by Hirschegger and colleagues (2010) showed section Allium to be a well supported clade with two main subclades, one of which included two smaller clades. All of the tetraploid forms of A. ampeloprasum were resolved in a single clade, and leeks appeared to be more closely allied to A. iranicum and A. atroviolaceum than A. ampeloprasum. Restoration of A. porrum L. was therefore proposed for the tertraploid forms, reserving A. ampeloprasum for the forms known horticulturally as great headed garlic and A. ampeloprasum var. babingtonii.

- Section Allium L.
  - Allium acutiflorum Lois.
  - Allium affine Ledeb.
  - Allium amethystinum Tausch (Syn.: Allium stojanovii Kov.)
  - Allium ampeloprasum L. (Syn. Allium babingtonii Borrer, Allium scorodoprasum var. babingtonii (Borrer) Regel, Allium kurrat Schweinf. ex K.Krause) (broadleaf) wild leek
  - Allium artemisietorum Eig & Feinbrun
  - Allium atroviolaceum Boiss. (Syn.: Allium ampeloprasum var. atroviolaceum (Boiss.) Regel)
  - Allium aucheri Boiss. (Syn.: Allium caerulescens Boiss.)
  - Allium bourgeaui Rech.f.
  - Allium commutatum Guss.
  - Allium curtum Boiss. & Gaill.
  - Allium dictyoprasum C.A.Mey. ex Kunth
  - Allium dilatatum Zahar.
  - Allium dregeanum Kunth
  - Allium ebusitanum Font Quer (Syn.: Allium durandoi (Batt. & Trab.) Seregin, Allium sphaerocephalon var. durandoi Batt. & Trab.)
  - Allium ekimianum Ekşi, Koyuncu & Özkan
  - Allium fuscoviolaceum Fomin
  - Allium gramineum K.Koch (Syn.: Allium fominianum Miscz. ex Grossh. & Schischk.)
  - Allium guttatum Steven (Syn.: Allium dalmaticum A.Kern. ex Janch., Allium margaritaceum Sm., Allium sardoum Moris)
  - Allium heldreichii Boiss.
  - Allium iranicum (Wendelbo) Wendelbo
  - Allium jubatum J.F.Macbr.
  - Allium leucanthum K.Koch
  - Allium macrochaetum Boiss. & Hausskn.
  - Allium melitense (Somm. & Caruana) Cif. & Giacom.(Syn. Allium ampeloprasum var. melitense Sommier & Caruana ex Borg.)
  - Allium polyanthum Schult. & Schult. f.
  - Allium ponticum Miscz. ex Grossh.
  - Allium porrum L. (Syn. A. ampeloprasum var. porrum (L.) J.Gay)
  - Allium pseudoampeloprasum Miscz. ex Grossh.
  - Allium pyrenaicum Costa & Vayr.
  - Allium rotundum L. (Syn. Allium jajlae Vved., Allium cilicium Boiss., Allium waldsteinii G.Don)
  - Allium sativum L. (Syn.: Allium longicuspis Regel) Type garlic
  - Allium scorodoprasum L. sand leek
  - Allium sphaerocephalon L. (Syn. Allium descendens L.)
  - Allium truncatum (Feinbrun) Kollmann & Zohary (Syn.: Allium ampeloprasum var. truncatum Feinbrun)
  - Allium tuncelianum (Kollmann) Özhatay et al. Tunceli garlic, Ovacik garlic
  - Allium vineale L. (Syn. Allium kochii Lange, Allium vineale var. purpureum H.P.G.Koch) crow garlic, wild garlic

====== Section Avulsea ======
- Section Avulsea F.O.Khass.
  - Allium rubellum M.Bieb. (Syn. Allium albanum Grossh.) Type
  - Allium umbilicatum Boiss.

====== Section Brevidentia ======
- Section Brevidentia F.O.Khass. et Iengalycheva
  - Allium brevidens Vved.
  - Allium haneltii F.O.Khass. & R.M.Fritsch

====== Section Brevispatha ======
- Section Brevispatha Valsecchi
  - Allium lojaconoi Brullo, Lanfr. & P.Pavone
  - Allium parciflorum Brullo, Lanfr. & P.Pavone Type

====== Section Caerulea ======
- Section Caerulea (Omelcz.) F.O.Khass.
  - Allium caeruleum Pall. (Syn. Allium azureum Ledeb., Allium viviparum Kar. & Kir.) Type blue globe onion
  - Allium caesium Schrenk (Syn.: Allium urceolatum Regel)
  - Allium delicatulum J.F.E.Siev. ex Schult. & Schult. f.

====== Section Codonoprasum ======
Section Codonoprason is strongly monophyletic and has its centre of diversity in the Mediterranean region, particularly Greece and Turkey, but extends to other areas of Europe, North Africa and the Middle East. It was originally conceived of as a separate genus, Codonoprasum by Reichenbach in 1828. The taxonomy of the section is complicated with inconsistent speciation. In 2005 the section was considered to consist of 58 species and 7 subspecies. The section is characterised as large plants with multiflowered inflorescences, long pedicels, very long spathe valves and a cylindrical-campanulate perigon, with unequal and long-caudate spathe leaves.

Historically the section has been considered to have a number of subsections. Friesen recognised 2, while others have described 3, e.g.;

Codonoprasum (Rchb.) Kamelin
Longistamineum Cheshm. ex Omelczuk
Haemoprason (F. Herm.) Cheshm.

Many species were previously included in a grouping referred to as the Paniculatum complex. Molecular studies demonstrate the presence of two clades within the section. Clade A contains the two autumn flowering species, Allium tardans and Allium parciflorum as a subclade. Clade B contains the smaller taxa within the section.

- Section Codonoprasum Reichenb.
  - Allium agrigentinum Brullo & Pavone
  - Allium apergii Trigas, Iatrou & Tzanoudakis
  - Allium apolloniensis B. Biel, Kit Tan & Tzanoud.
  - Allium brulloi Salmeri
  - Allium candargyi Karavok. & Tzanoud.
  - Allium carinatum L. (Syn.: Allium pulchellum G.Don)
  - Allium castellanense (Garbari, Miceli & Raimondo) Brullo, Guglielmo, Pavone & Salmeri
  - Allium chloranthum Boiss.
  - Allium dentiferum Webb & Berthel
  - Allium desertorum Forssk.
  - Allium dodecanesii Karavokyrou & Tzanoudak
  - Allium dirphianum Brullo, Guglielmo, Pavone, Salmeri & Terrasi
  - Allium dumanii Koyuncu & Koçyiğit
  - Allium exile Boiss. & Orph.
  - Allium flavum L. (Syn.: Allium paczoskianum Tuzson)
  - Allium garganicum Brullo, Pavone, Salmeri & Terrasi
  - Allium guicciardii Heldr.
  - Allium kunthianum Vved. (Syn.: Allium lepidum Kunth)
  - Allium lehmanii Lojac.
  - Allium melanantherum Pančić
  - Allium occultum Tzanoudakis & Trigas
  - Allium oleraceum L. Type field garlic
  - Allium pallens L. (Syn.: Allium coppoleri Tineo)
  - Allium paniculatum L. (Syn.: Allium karsianum Fomin)
  - Allium parciflorum Viv.
  - Allium parnassicum (Boiss.) Halacsy
  - Allium phitosianum Brullo, Guglielmo, Pavone, Salmeri & Terrasi
  - Allium pilosum Sm.
  - Allium platakisii Tzanoud. & Kypr.
  - Allium pseudoflavum Vved.
  - Allium rausii Brullo, Guglidmo, Pavone, Salmeri & Terrasi
  - Allium rupestre Steven (Syn.: Allium charaulicum Fomin)
  - Allium savii Parl.
  - Allium stamineum Boiss.
  - Allium tardans Greuter & Zahar.
  - Allium telmatum Bogdanovic, Brullo, Giusso & Salmeri
  - Allium tenuiflorum Ten.

====== Section Costulatae ======
- Section Costulatae F.O.Khass. & Yengal.
  - Allium filidens Regel Type
  - Allium turcomanicum Regel

====== Other ======
- Section Crystallina F.O.Khass. & Yengalycheva
  - Allium crystallinum Vved.
- Section Eremoprasum (Kamelin) F.O.Khass. ex R.M.Fritsch & N.Friesen
  - Allium sabulosum Steven ex Bunge Type
- Section Kopetdagia F. O. Khassanov
  - Allium kopetdagense Vved.
- Section Longivaginata (Kamelin) F.O.Khass. ex R.M.Fritsch & N.Friesen
  - Allium longivaginatum Wendelbo
- Section Minuta F. O. Khassanov
  - Allium minutum Vved.
- Section Mediasia F.O.Khass., Yengalycheva & N.Friesen
  - Allium turkestanicum Regel
- Section Multicaulea F.O.Khass. & Yengalycheva
  - Allium lehmannianum Merckl. ex Bunge
- Section Pallasia (Tzag.) F.O.Khass. ex R.M.Fritsch & N.Friesen
  - Allium pallasii Murray Type
  - Allium tanguticum Regel
- Section Spathulata F.O. Khass. & R.M.Fritsch
  - Allium spathulatum Khass. & R.M.Fritsch
- Unplaced
  - Allium macrostemon Bunge (Syn. Allium grayi Regel, Allium nipponicum Franch. & Sav.) (Note: The history of A. macrostemon is complex. Historically the species was included in subgenus Allium section Scorodon s.l.. When the species in the section were redistributed by Friesen et al. 2006 they were unable to allocate this species to a section and questioned whether a new section should be created. Nguyen et al. (2008) found it most closely related to species within section Codonoprason. In contrast Li et al. (2010) placed it in section Allium and Choi et al. (2012) believed it belonged in section Caerulea, but did not recommend moving it on the basis of available information. It is therefore unplaced within subgenus Allium or considered the sole member of section Scorodon s.l.)

===== Subgenus Reticulatobulbosa =====
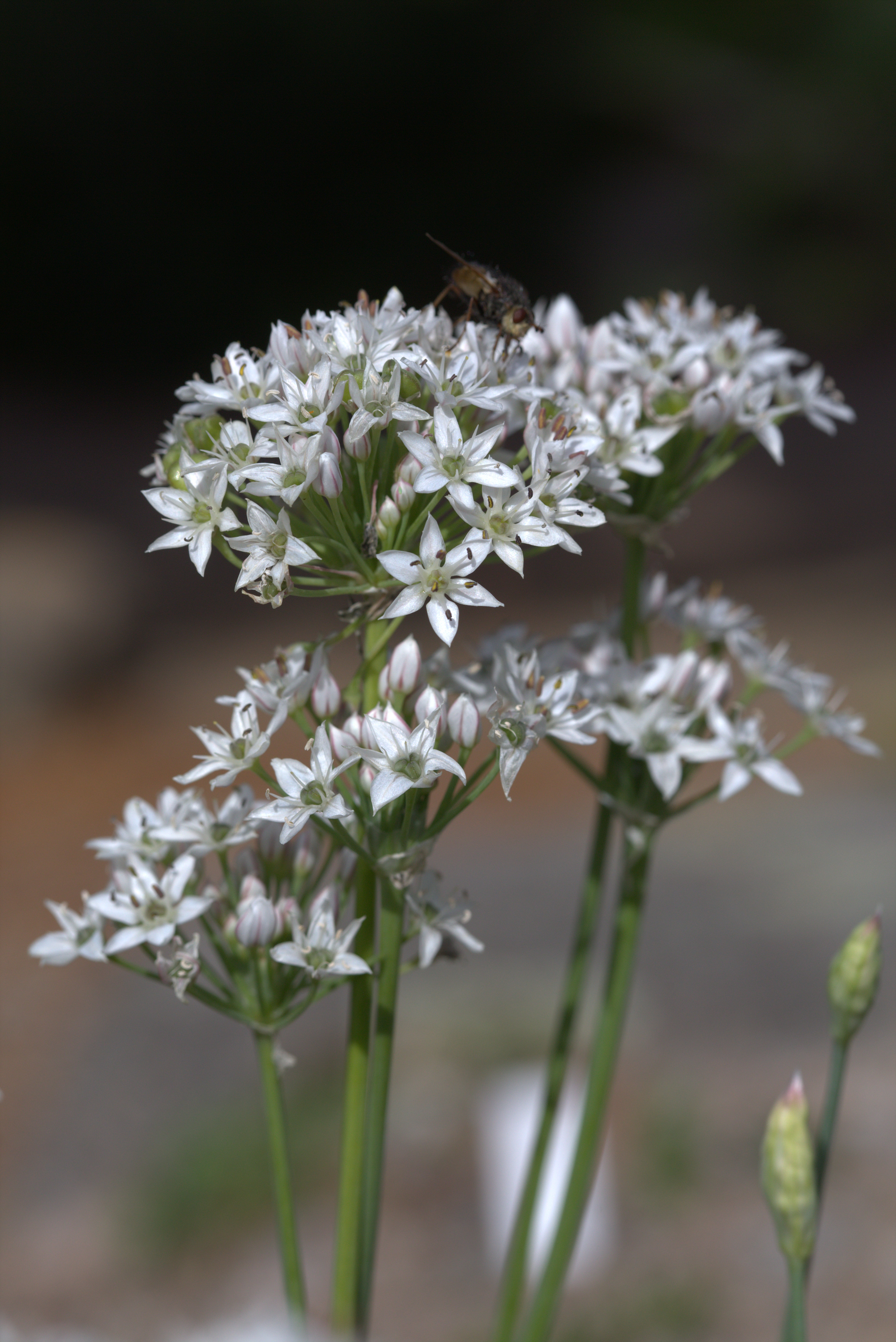
Allium barsczewskii

The second largest subgenus in the third evolutionary line. 5 sections.

- Section Campanulata Type A. xiphopetalum
- Section Nigrimontana Type A. drobovii
- Section Reticulatobulbosa Type A. lineare
- Section Scabriscapa Type A. scabriscapum
- Section Sikkimensia Type A. sikkimense

Sections

- Section Campanulata Kamelin
  - Allium barsczewskii Lipsky
  - Allium drepanophyllum Vved.
  - Allium inconspicuum Vved.
  - Allium jodanthum Vved.
  - Allium xiphopetalum Aitch. Type
- Section Nigrimontana N.Friesen

Kazakhstan

  - Allium drobovii Vved. Type
  - Allium oreoprasoides Vved.
- Section Reticulatobulbosa Kamelin
  - Allium amphibolum Ledeb.
  - Allium clathratum Ledeb.
  - Allium eriocoleum Vved.
  - Allium flavidum Ledeb.
  - Allium flavovirens Regel (Syn. Allium leucocephalum Turcz. ex Vved., Allium schischkinii K.Sobol.)
  - Allium koreanum H.J.Choi & B.U.Oh
  - Allium lineare L. Type
  - Allium pseudostrictum Albov
  - Allium splendens Willd.
  - Allium strictum Schrad.
  - Allium szovitsii Regel
- Section Scabriscapa (Tscholok.) N.Friesen
  - Allium scabriscapum Boiss. & Kotschy (including A. eriocoleum Vved.) Type
  - Allium sulphureum Vved.
  - Allium trachyscordum Vved.
- Section Sikkimensia N.Friesen

Southwestern and southern China

  - Allium beesianum W.W.Sm.
  - Allium cyaneum Regel
  - Allium sikkimense Baker (Syn. Allium kansuense Regel, Allium tibeticum Rendle) Type

===== Subgenus Polyprason =====
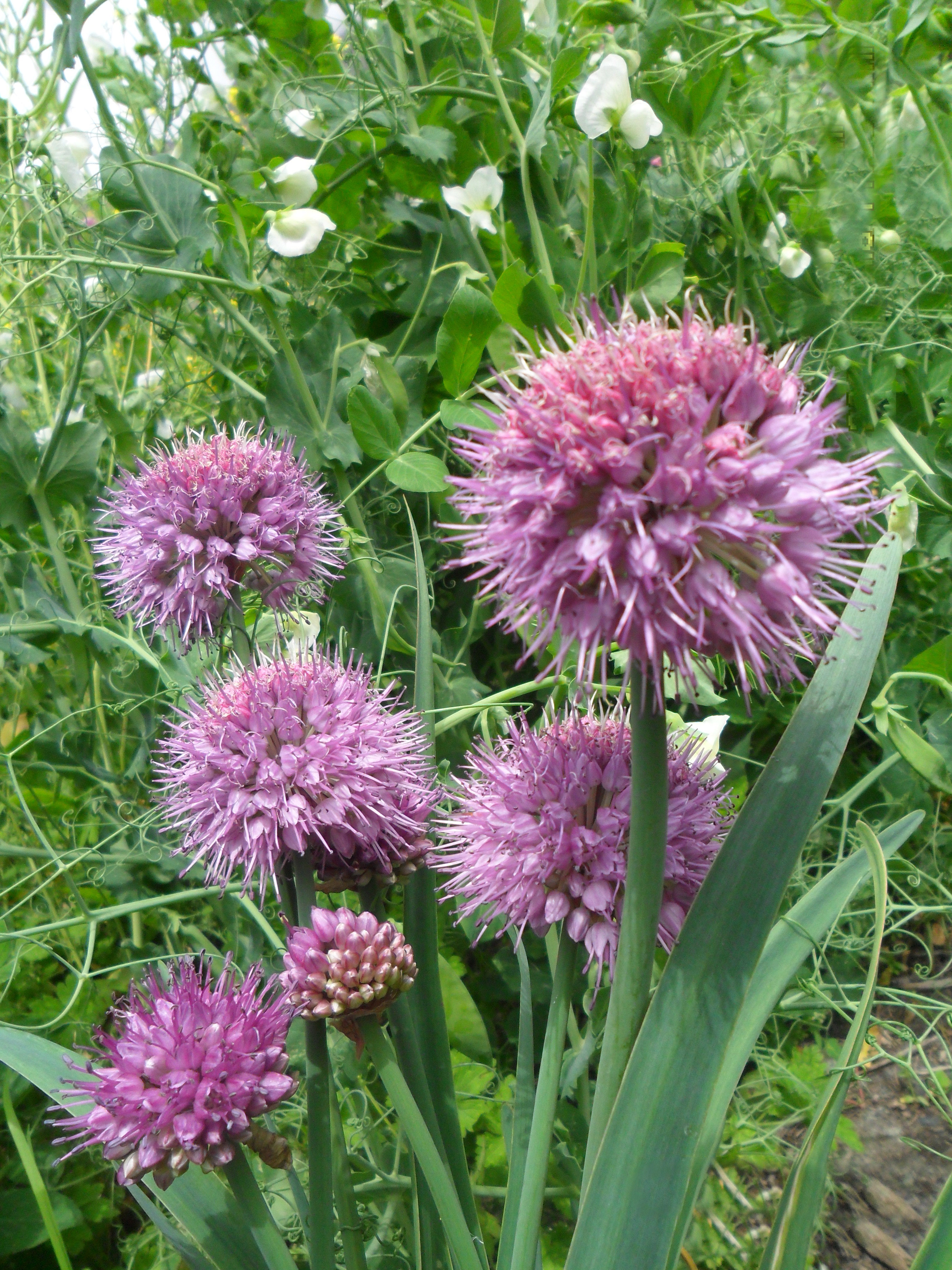
Allium carolinianum

4 sections

- Section Daghestanica Type A. daghestanicum
- Section Falcatifolia Type A. carolinianum
- Section Oreiprason Type A. saxatile
- Section Scorodon Type A. moschatum

Sections

- Section Daghestanica (Tscholok.) N.Friesen

2 geographical alliances

1. Caucasian species (A. daghestanicum, A. gunibicum)
2. European species from the eastern Alps to the Pyrenees

  - Allium chrysanthum Regel
  - Allium chrysocephalum Regel
  - Allium daghestanicum Grossh. Type
  - Allium ericetorum Thore (Syn. Allium ochroleucum Waldst. & Kit.)
  - Allium gunibicum Miscz. ex Grossh.
  - Allium herderianum Regel
  - Allium kermesinum Rchb.
  - Allium maowenense J.M.Xu
  - Allium rude J.M.Xu
  - Allium suaveolens Jacq.
  - Allium xichuanense J.M.Xu
- Section Falcatifolia N.Friesen

Montane to subalpine belt of Central Asian mountains

  - Allium carolinianum DC. (Syn. Allium blandum Wall., Allium polyphyllum Kar. & Kir., Allium thomsonii Baker) Type
  - Allium hymenorhizum Ledeb.
  - Allium platyspathum Schrenk
- Section Oreiprason F.Herm.
  - Allium albovianum Vved. (Syn. Allium gracile Albov)
  - Allium consanguineum Kunth
  - Allium glaciale Vved.
  - Allium goloskokovii Vved.
  - Allium horvatii Lovrić
  - Allium kaschianum Regel
  - Allium kokanicum Regel
  - Allium obliquum L.
  - Allium roylei Stearn
  - Allium saxatile M.Bieb. (Syn. Allium globosum M.Bieb. ex DC.) Type
  - Allium stracheyi Baker
  - Allium talassicum Regel
- Section Scorodon Koch sensu stricto (s.s.) (Note: In older classifications, such as Hanelt (1992) section Scorodon was placed in subgenus Allium. It was a relatively large section with several subsections. In the study of Friesen et al. 2006 the section was shown not to be monophyletic, and most species were allocated to other sections. One subsection segregated with subgenus Polyprason and was elevated to section Scorodon. To distinguish between the two, the older section is designated Scorodon s.l. and the new section Scorodon s.s.)
  - Allium frigidum Boiss. & Heldr.
  - Allium jacquemontii Kunth
  - Allium moschatum L. subgenus Type
  - Allium popovii Vved.

===== Subgenus Cepa =====
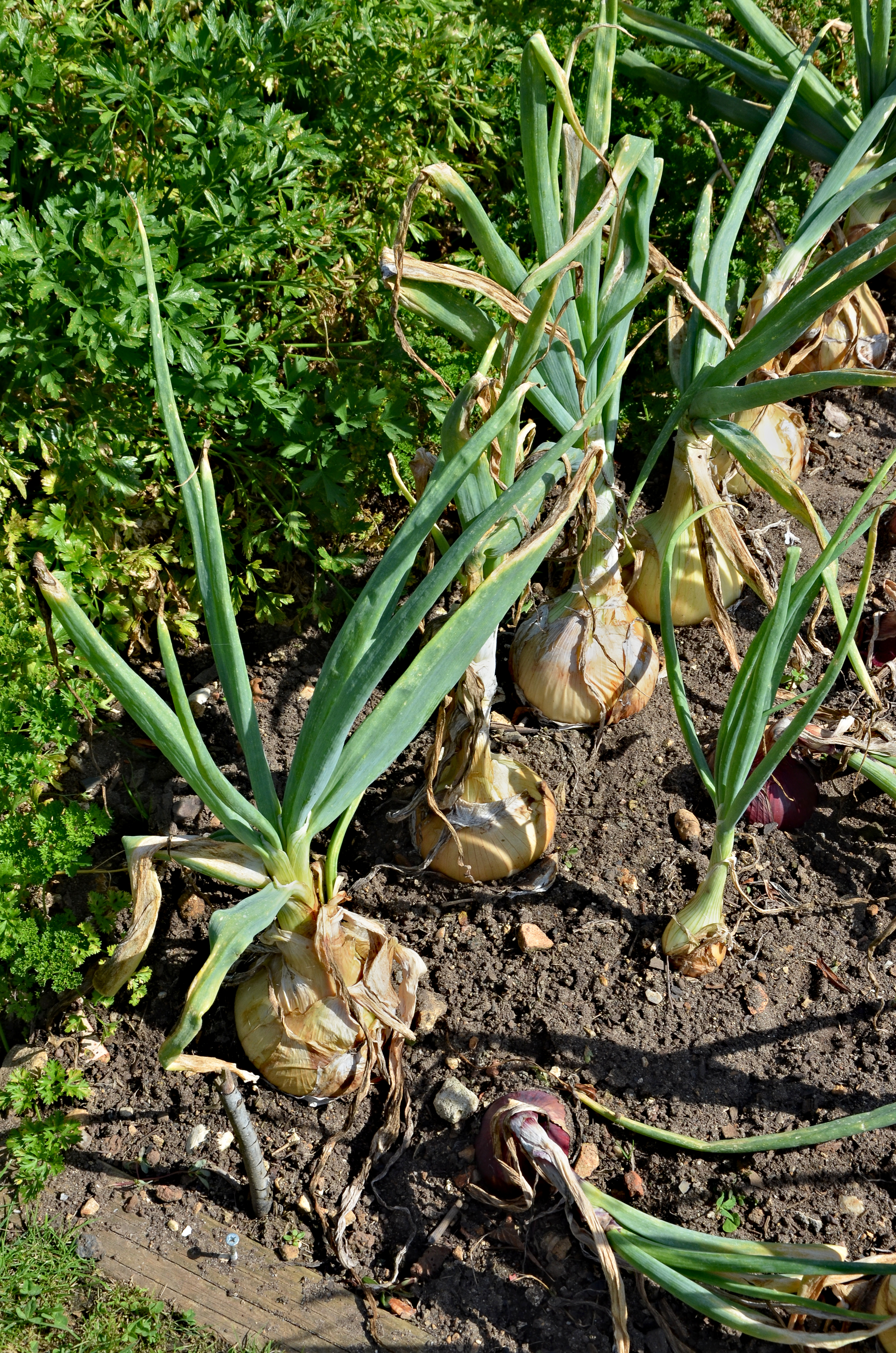
Type species: Allium cepa

Polyphyletic. 5 sections.

- Section Annuloprason Type A. fedschenkoanum
- Section Cepa Type A. cepa
- Section Condensatum Type A. condensatum
- Section Sacculiferum Type A. sacculiferum
- Section Schoenoprasum Type A. schoenoprasum

Sections

- Section Annuloprason T.V.Egorova
  - Allium atrosanguineum Schrenk (including Allium fedschenkoanum Regel; Allium kaufmannii Regel)
  - Allium fedschenkoanum Regel. Type
  - Allium semenovii Regel
- Section Cepa (Mill.) Prokh.
  - Allium altaicum Pall.
  - Allium asarense R.M.Fritsch & Matin
  - Allium cepa L. Type onion
  - Allium ×cornutum Clementi
  - Allium farctum Wendelbo
  - Allium fistulosum L. Welsh onion
  - Allium galanthum Kar. & Kir. (Syn. Allium pseudocepa Schrenk)
  - Allium oschaninii O.Fedtsch. shallot
  - Allium praemixtum Vved.
  - Allium ×proliferum (Moench) Schrad. ex Willd. (= A. fistulosum × A. cepa, Syn. Allium cepa var. bulbiferum Regel, Allium cepa var. proliferum (Moench) Alef., Allium cepa var. viviparum (Metzg.) Alef., Allium cepa viviparum Metzg., Allium ×wakegii Araki)
  - Allium pskemense B.Fedtsch.
  - Allium rhabdotum Stearn
  - Allium vavilovii Popov & Vved.
- Section Condensatum N. Friesen

Eastern Siberia and Mongolia north to Korea and Japan

  - Allium condensatum Turcz.
- Section Sacculiferum P.P.Gritz. (Note: Whereas Friesen et al. 2006 treat A. taquetii as synonymous with the type species A. thunbergii, Choi and Oh 2011 present evidence as to why they should be treated separately)
  - Allium chinense G.Don (Syn. Allium bakeri Regel) Chinese onion
  - Allium linearifolium H.J.Choi & B.U.Oh
  - Allium longistylum Baker (Syn. A. jeholense Franch., A. hopeiense Nakai)
  - Allium pseudojaponicum Makino
  - Allium sacculiferum Maxim.
  - Allium taquetii H.Lév.
  - Allium thunbergii G.Don Type
  - Allium virgunculae F.Maek. & Kitam.
- Section Schoenoprasum Dum.
  - Allium altyncolicum N.Friesen
  - Allium karelinii Poljakov (Syn. Allium schoenoprasum var. scaberrimum Regel)
  - Allium ledebourianum Schult. & Schult. f.
  - Allium maximowiczii Regel
  - Allium oliganthum Kar. & Kir. (Syn. Allium stenophyllum Schrenk)
  - Allium schmitzii Cout.
  - Allium schoenoprasum L. Type chives

== Etymology ==
The name Allium is ancient, and the plant was known to both the Romans and the Greeks. The name is thought to be Celtic in origin, meaning "to burn", in reference to its taste and smell. One of the earliest uses of the name in botany was by Joseph Pitton de Tournefort (1656–1708).

== Bibliography ==
=== Books ===
- Adanson, Michel (1763). Familles des plantes. Paris: Vincent.
- Block, Eric (2009). Garlic and other alliums: the lore and the science. Cambridge: Royal Society of Chemistry. ISBN 978-0-85404-190-9.
- Brewster, J. L. (2008). Onions and Other Alliums. CABI Publishing. ISBN 978-1-84593-399-9.
- Clusius, Carolus (1601). Rariarum plantarum historia. Antwerp: Ioannem Moretum.
- Dahlgren, R.M.; Clifford, H.T.; Yeo, P.F. (1985). The families of the monocotyledons. Berlin: Springer-Verlag. ISBN 978-3-642-64903-5.
- Davies, D. (1992). Alliums: The Ornamental Onions. Timber Press. ISBN 978-0-88192-241-7.
- Dumortier, Barthélemy Charles Joseph (1827). Florula Belgica, operis majoris prodromus. Tournay: Casterman.
- Gregory, Mary; Fritsch, R. M.; Friesen, N.; Khassanov, F.O.; McNeal, D. W., eds. (1998). Nomenclator Alliorum: Allium names and synonyms - a world guide. Kew: Royal Botanic Gardens. p. 83. ISBN 978-1-900347-64-8.
- Hanelt, P; Hammer, K; Knüpffer, H, eds. (1992). The genus Allium: taxonomic problems and genetic resources. Proceedings of an international symposium held at Gatersleben, Germany, 11–13 June 1991 (PDF). Gatersleben, Germany: Institut für Pflanzengenetik und Kulturpflanzenforschung.
- Jaume Saint-Hilaire, Jean Henri (1805). Exposition de familles naturales. Paris: Treutel et Würtz.
- Jay, Martha (2016). Onions and Garlic: A global history. Reaktion. p. 144. ISBN 978-1-78023-587-5.
- Jussieu, Antoine Laurent de (1789). Genera Plantarum, secundum ordines naturales disposita juxta methodum in Horto Regio Parisiensi exaratam. Paris: apud viduam Herissant et Theophilum Barrois.
- Kamelin, RV (1973). Florogeneticheskij analiz estestvennoj flory (in Russian). Leningrad: Nauka. p. 354. ISBN 978-5-458-47145-9.
- De Lamarck, Jean-Baptiste; De Candolle, Augustin Pyramus (1815). Flore française ou descriptions succinctes de toutes les plantes qui croissent naturellement en France disposées selon une nouvelle méthode d'analyse; et précédées par un exposé des principes élémentaires de la botanique. Vol. III (3 ed.). Paris: Desray.
- Linnaeus, C. (1753). Species Plantarum: exhibentes plantas rite cognitas, ad genera relatas, cum differentiis specificis, nominibus trivialibus, synonymis selectis, locis natalibus, secundum systema sexuale digestas. Stockholm: Impensis Laurentii Salvii.
- Mathew, Brian (1996). A review of Allium sect. Allium. Kew: Royal Botanic Gardens, Kew. ISBN 978-0-947643-93-5.
- Motta, Anselmo; Motta, Virginio, eds. (1962). Enciclopedia Motta di Scienze Naturali v.1 Botanica. Milan: Federico Motta Editore. p. 76.
- Rabinowitch, H. D.; Currah, L. (2002). Allium Crop Sciences: Recent Advances. CABI Publishing. ISBN 978-0-85199-510-6.
- von Regel, Eduard August (1875). Alliorum adhuc cognitorum monographia. St Petersburgh: Petropolis.
- Quattrocchi, Umberto (1999). CRC world dictionary of plant names: common names, scientific names, eponyms, synonyms, and etymology. Boca Raton, FL: CRC Press. ISBN 978-0-8493-2673-8.
- Reichenbach, Heinrich Gottlieb Ludwig (1828). Conspectus regni vegetabilis per gradus naturales evoluti (in Latin). Leipzig: Carolum Cnobloch.
- Serna, A E; López-Ferrari, A R (1992). Las monocotiledoneas Mexicanas: una sinopsis floristica, Parte I: Agavaceae, Alismataceae, Alliaceae, Alstromeriaceae y Amaryllidaceae. Consejo Nacional de la Flora de México. ISBN 978-968-6144-07-9.
- Woodward, P. (1996). Garlic and Friends: The History, Growth and Use of Edible Alliums. Hyland House. ISBN 978-1-86447-009-3.

=== Chapters ===
- Fritsch, RM; Friesen, N. Evolution, domestication and taxonomy. pp. 5–30., in Rabinowitch & Currah (2002)
- Hanelt, P; Schulze-Motel, J; Fritsch, R M; Kruse, J; Maass, H; Ohle, H; Pistrick, K. Infrageneric grouping of Allium— the Gatersleben approach. pp. 107–123., in Hanelt et al. (1992)

=== Articles and theses ===
- Choi, Hyeok JAE; Oh, Byoung UN (October 2011). "A partial revision of Allium (Amaryllidaceae) in Korea and north-eastern China". Botanical Journal of the Linnean Society. 167 (2): 153–211. doi:10.1111/j.1095-8339.2011.01166.x.
- Banfi, Enrico; Galasso, Gabriele; Soldano, Adriano (1 September 2011). "Notes on systematics and taxonomy for the Italian vascular flora. 2". Natural History Sciences (Milan). 152 (2): 85–106. doi:10.4081/nhs.2011.85.
- Deniz, İsmail Gökhan; Genç, İlker; Sarı, Duygu (9 June 2015). "Morphological and molecular data reveal a new species of Allium (Amaryllidaceae) from SW Anatolia, Turkey". Phytotaxa. 212 (4): 283–292. doi:10.11646/phytotaxa.212.4.4.
- Don, George (1832). "A monograph of the genus Allium". Memoirs of the Wernerian Natural History Society. 6: 1–102.
- Ekşi, Gülnur; Koyuncu, Mehmet; Özkan, Ayşe Mİne Gençler (6 April 2016). "Allium ekimianum: a new species (Amaryllidaceae) from Turkey". PhytoKeys (62): 83–93. doi:10.3897/phytokeys.62.7796. PMC 4856905. PMID 27212884.
- Fragman-Sapir, Ori; Fritsch, Reinhard M. (2011). "New species of Allium sect. Melanocrommyum from the eastern Mediterranean" (PDF). Herbertia. 65: 31–50. Archived from the original (PDF) on 2016-09-23.
- Friesen, N.; Fritsch, R.; Bachmann, K. (17 December 1997). "Hybrid origin of some ornamentals of Allium subgenus Melanocrommyum verified with GISH and RAPD" (PDF). Theoretical and Applied Genetics. 95 (8): 1229–1238. doi:10.1007/s001220050686. S2CID 21554910.
- Friesen, Nikolai; Fritsch, Reinhard M.; Pollner, Sven; Blattner, Frank R. (2000). "Molecular and Morphological Evidence for an Origin of the Aberrant Genus Milula within Himalayan Species of Allium (Alliacae)". Molecular Phylogenetics and Evolution. 17 (2): 209–218. Bibcode:2000MolPE..17..209F. doi:10.1006/mpev.2000.0844. PMID 11083935.
- Fritsch, RM; Gurushidze, M; Jedelská, J; Keusgen, M (2006). "More than a pretty face - ornamental "drumstick onions" of Allium subg. Melanocrommyum are also potential medicinal plants". Herbertia. 60: 26–59.
- Fritsch, R; Keusgen, M (June 2006). "Occurrence and taxonomic significance of cysteine sulphoxides in the genus Allium L. (Alliaceae)". Phytochemistry. 67 (11): 1127–1135. Bibcode:2006PChem..67.1127F. doi:10.1016/j.phytochem.2006.03.006. PMID 16626766.
- Gurushidze, Maia; Fuchs, Jörg; Blattner, Frank R. (1 March 2012). "The Evolution of Genome Size Variation in Drumstick Onions (Allium subgenus Melanocrommyum)". Systematic Botany. 37 (1): 96–104. doi:10.1600/036364412X616675. S2CID 85838253.
- Hanelt, Peter (1996). "Taxonomic problems in Mediterranean Allium, and relationships with non-Mediterranean Allium groups" (PDF). Bocconea. 5: 259–265.
- Khassanov, Furkat O.; Yengalycheva, Svetlana S.; Japakova, Ulbosoon N. (24 June 1997). "Taxonomic remarks on Allium L. subg. Allium sect. Allium s. lat.". Botanische Jahrbücher für Systematik, Pflanzengeschichte und Pflanzengeographie. 119 (2): 267–275.
- Khassanov, F. O.; Shomuradov, H.; Tojibaev, K. (18 December 2007). "A new Allium L . species from middle Asia" (PDF). Linzer Biologische Beiträge. 39 (2): 799–802.
- Rieseberg, Loren H.; Peterson, Paul M.; Soltis, Douglas E.; Annable, Carol R. (November 1987). "Genetic Divergence and Isozyme Number Variation Among Four Varieties of Allium douglasii (Alliaceae)". American Journal of Botany. 74 (11): 1614. doi:10.2307/2444130. JSTOR 2444130.
- Saghir, AR; Mann, LK; Yamaguchi, M (1965). "Composition of Volatiles in Allium as Related to Habitat, Stage of Growth, and Plant Part". Plant Physiology. 40 (4): 681–5. doi:10.1104/pp.40.4.681. PMC 550361. PMID 16656143.
- Saghir, Abdur Rahman B.; Mann, Louis K.; Ownbey, Marion; Berg, Rolf Y. (May 1966). "Composition of Volatiles in Relation to Taxonomy of American Alliums". American Journal of Botany. 53 (5): 477–484. doi:10.2307/2440346. JSTOR 2440346.
- Stearn, W. T. (1944). "Notes on the genus Allium in the Old World; its distribution, names, literature, classification and garden-worthy species". Herbertia. 11: 11–34.
- Sykorova, E.; Fajkus, J.; Meznikova, M.; Lim, K. Y.; Neplechova, K.; Blattner, F. R.; Chase, M. W.; Leitch, A. R. (1 June 2006). "Minisatellite telomeres occur in the family Alliaceae but are lost in Allium". American Journal of Botany. 93 (6): 814–823. doi:10.3732/ajb.93.6.814. PMID 21642143.
- Traub, Hamilton P (1968). "The subgenera, sections and subsections of Allium L.". Plant Life. 24: 147–163.
- Wendelbo, Per (1966). "New taxa and synonyms in Allium and Nectaroscordum of S.W. Asia". Acta Horti Gothoborgensis. 28 (2): 15–55.
- Wendelbo, Per (1969). "New subgenera, sections and species of Allium". Botaniska Notiser. 122: 25–37.
- Zubaida Yousaf; Zabta Khan Shinwari; Rizwana ALEEM Qureshi; Mir Ajab Khan; Syed Shahinshah Gilani (2004). "Can complexity of the genus Allium L., be resolved through some numerical techniques?" (PDF). Pak. J. Bot. 36 (3): 487–501.

==== Phylogenetics ====
- von Berg, Gerlinde Linne; Samoylov, Alexander; Klaas, Manfred; Hanelt, Peter (September 1996). "Chloroplast DNA restriction analysis and the infrageneric grouping of Allium (Alliaceae)". Plant Systematics and Evolution. 200 (3–4): 253–261. Bibcode:1996PSyEv.200..253V. doi:10.1007/bf00984939. S2CID 12751231.
- Choi, Hyeok Jae; Cota-Sánchez, J. Hugo (September 2010). "A taxonomic revision of Allium (Alliaceae) in the Canadian prairie provinces" (PDF). Botany. 88 (9): 787–809. doi:10.1139/B10-056. Archived from the original (PDF) on 2015-09-19.
- Choi, Hyeok Jae; Davis, Arthur R.; Cota-Sánchez, J. Hugo (2011). "Comparative Floral Structure of Four New World Allium (Amaryllidaceae) Species". Systematic Botany. 36 (4): 870–882. doi:10.1600/036364411x604895. S2CID 85573965.
- Choi, Hyeok Jae; Giussani, Liliana M.; Jang, Chang Gee; Oh, Byoung Un; Cota-Sánchez, J. Hugo (June 2012). "Systematics of disjunct northeastern Asian and northern North American Allium (Amaryllidaceae)". Botany. 90 (6): 491–508. doi:10.1139/b2012-031. hdl:11336/68813.
- Friesen, N; Fritsch, RM; Blattner, Frank R (2006). "Phylogeny and new intrageneric classification of Allium (Alliaceae) based on nuclear ribosomal DNA ITS sequences". Aliso. 22: 372–395. doi:10.5642/aliso.20062201.31.
- Friesen, Nikolai (2008). "Die Gattung Allium – Taxonomischer Überblick und wissenschaftliche Sammlung im Botanischen Garten der Universität Osnabrück" (PDF). Osnabrücker Naturwissenschaftliche Mitteilungen (in German). 33/34: 95–110.
- Fritsch, R.M.; Abbasi, M. (2008). "New taxa and other contributions to the taxonomy of Allium L. (Alliaceae) in Iran". Rostaniha. 9 (Supplement 2): 1–73.
- Huang, De-Qing; Yang, Jing-Tian; Zhou, Chun-Jing; Zhou, Song-Dong; He, Xing-Jin (21 December 2013). "Phylogenetic reappraisal of Allium subgenus Cyathophora (Amaryllidaceae) and related taxa, with a proposal of two new sections". Journal of Plant Research. 127 (2): 275–286. doi:10.1007/s10265-013-0617-8. PMID 24362461. S2CID 15531719.
- İpek, Meryem; İpek, Ahmet; Simon, Philipp W. (2014). "Testing the utility of matK and ITS DNA regions for discrimination of Allium species". Turkish Journal of Botany. 38: 203–212. doi:10.3906/bot-1308-46.
- Li, Q.-Q.; Zhou, S.-D.; He, X.-J.; Yu, Y.; Zhang, Y.-C.; Wei, X.-Q. (21 October 2010). "Phylogeny and biogeography of Allium (Amaryllidaceae: Allieae) based on nuclear ribosomal internal transcribed spacer and chloroplast rps16 sequences, focusing on the inclusion of species endemic to China". Annals of Botany. 106 (5): 709–733. doi:10.1093/aob/mcq177. PMC 2958792. PMID 20966186.
- Nguyen, Nhu H.; Driscoll, Heather E.; Specht, Chelsea D. (2008). "A molecular phylogeny of the wild onions (Allium; Alliaceae) with a focus on the western North American center of diversity" (PDF). Molecular Phylogenetics and Evolution. 47 (3): 1157–1172. Bibcode:2008MolPE..47.1157N. doi:10.1016/j.ympev.2007.12.006. PMID 18226928.
- Peterson, Paul M.; Annable, Carol R.; Rieseberg, Loren H. (April 1988). "Systematic Relationships and Nomenclatural Changes in the Allium douglasii Complex (Alliaceae)". Systematic Botany. 13 (2): 207. doi:10.2307/2419099. JSTOR 2419099.
- Seregin, Alexey P.; Anačkov, Goran; Friesen, Nikolai (May 2015). "Molecular and morphological revision of the Allium saxatile group (Amaryllidaceae): geographical isolation as the driving force of underestimated speciation". Botanical Journal of the Linnean Society. 178 (1): 67–101. doi:10.1111/boj.12269.
- Wheeler, Erica Jean (December 2011). Phylogenetic and phylogenomic studies of wild oni ons (Allium, Amaryllidaceae ) at three taxonomic scales (PDF) (PhD). University of Missouri.

===== Subgenera and sections =====
Line 1

- Samoylov, A.; Friesen, N.; Pollner, S.; Hanelt, P. (1999). "Use of chloroplast DNA polymorphisms for the phylogenetic study of Allium subgenus Amerallium and subgenus Bromatorrhiza (Alliaceae) II". Feddes Repertorium. 110 (1–2): 103–109. doi:10.1002/fedr.19991100118.
- Wheeler, E. J.; Mashayekhi, S.; McNeal, D. W.; Columbus, J. T.; Pires, J. C. (26 March 2013). "Molecular systematics of Allium subgenus Amerallium (Amaryllidaceae) in North America". American Journal of Botany. 100 (4): 701–711. doi:10.3732/ajb.1200641. PMID 23535771.

Line 2

- Li, R. J.; Shang, Z. Y.; Cui, T. C.; Xu, J. M. (1996). "Studies on karyotypes and phylogenetic relationship of Allium sect. Caloscordum (Liliaceae) from China". Acta Phytotax. Sin. (in Chinese). 34: 288–295.
- Li, Qin-Qin; Zhou, Song-Dong; Huang, De-Qing; He, Xing-Jin; Wei, Xian-Qin (2016). "Molecular phylogeny, divergence time estimates and historical biogeography within one of the world's largest monocot genera". AoB Plants. 8 plw041. doi:10.1093/aobpla/plw041. PMC 4976397. PMID 27339054.
- Fritsch, RM; Blattner, FR; Gurushidze, M (2010). "New classification of Allium L. subg. Melanocrommyum (Webb & Berthel) Rouy (Alliaceae) based on molecular and morphological characters". Phyton. 49: 145–220.
- Gurushidze, Maia; Fritsch, Reinhard M; Blattner, Frank R (2010). "Species-level phylogeny of Allium subgenus Melanocrommyum: Incomplete lineage sorting, hybridization and trnF gene duplication". Taxon. 59 (3): 829–840. doi:10.1002/tax.593012.

Line 3

- Dubouzet, J. G.; Shinoda, K.; Murata, N. (17 December 1997). "Phylogeny of Allium L. subgenus Rhizirideum (G. Don ex Koch) Wendelbo according to dot blot hybridization with randomly amplified DNA probes". Theoretical and Applied Genetics. 95 (8): 1223–1228. doi:10.1007/s001220050685. S2CID 33083704.
- van Raamsdonk, L.W.D.; Vrielink-van Ginkel, M.; Kik, C. (12 May 2000). "Phylogeny reconstruction and hybrid analysis in Allium subgenus Rhizirideum". Theoretical and Applied Genetics. 100 (7): 1000–1009. doi:10.1007/s001220051381. S2CID 12912078.

subgen. Allium

- Hirschegger, Pablo; Jaške, Jernej; Trontelj, Peter; Bohanec, Borut (2010). "Origins of Allium ampeloprasum horticultural groups and a molecular phylogeny of the section Allium (Allium; Alliaceae)"". Molecular Phylogenetics and Evolution. 54 (2): 488–497. Bibcode:2010MolPE..54..488H. doi:10.1016/j.ympev.2009.08.030. PMID 19733249.

sect. Codonoprasum

- Biel, Burkhard; Tan, Kit; Tzanoudakis, Dimitrios (27 February 2006). "A new autumn-flowering species of Allium from the island of Sifnos (Cyclades, Greece)" (PDF). Willdenowia. 36 (1): 367–372. doi:10.3372/wi.36.36132. S2CID 54003924.
- Brullo, Salvatore; Guglielmo, Anna; Pavone, Pietro; Salmeri, Cristina; Terrasi, M. Carmen (January 2003). "Three new species of Allium sect. Codonoprasum from Greece". Plant Biosystems. 137 (2): 131–140. Bibcode:2003PBios.137..131B. doi:10.1080/11263500312331351391. S2CID 86821437.
- Cesmedziev, I; Terzijski, D (1997). "A scanning electron microscopic study of the spermoderm in Allium subg. Codonoprasum (Alliaceae)" (PDF). Bocconea. 5: 755–758.
- Koçyiğit, Mine; Özhatay, Neriman (2010). "A contribution to the genus Allium L. (Sect. Codonoprasum) in Turkey" (PDF). Turkish Journal of Botany. 34: 391–395.
- Koçyiğıt, Mine; Yeşıl, Yeter; Koyuncu, Mehmet (14 January 2016). "Allium dumanii (A. sect. Codonoprasum, Amaryllidaceae), a new species from E Turkey". Willdenowia. 46 (1): 113–119. doi:10.3372/wi.46.46109. S2CID 88440208.
- Salmeri, Cristina; Brullo, Cristian; Brullo, Salvatore; Galdo, Giampietro Giusso Del; Moysiyenko, Ivan I. (March 2016). "What is Allium paniculatum? Establishing taxonomic and molecular phylogenetic relationships within A. sect. Codonoprasum". Journal of Systematics and Evolution. 54 (2): 123–135. doi:10.1111/jse.12170. S2CID 83671442.
- Seregin, Alexey (17–23 July 2005). "Allium L. sect. Codonoprasum Reichenb. (Alliaceae), a taxonomic and chorological study: what is a taxonomic value of narrow endemics?". Proceedings of the XVII International Botanical Congress. Vienna, Austria, Europe. doi:10.13140/2.1.2555.9047.
- Trigas, Panayiotis; Gregoris, Iatrou; Tzanoudakis, Dimitris (January 2010). "Allium apergii sp. nov. (Alliaceae, A. sect. Codonoprasum) from Evvia Island, Greece". Journal of Biological Research. 14: 225–229.
- Tzanoudakis, Dimitris; Trigas, Panayiotis (12 March 2015). "Allium occultum, a new species of A. sect. Codonoprasum (Amaryllidaceae) from Skiros Island (W Aegean, Greece)". Phytotaxa. 202 (2): 135. doi:10.11646/phytotaxa.202.2.5.

=== Websites ===
- "Flora of North America". 2008.
- "Linnaeus Sexual System". CronkLab. Biodiversity Research Centre, University of British Columbia.
- Pacific Bulb Society: Allium
  - Pacific Bulb Society: Rhizomatous Alliums

==== Databases ====
- GRIN (2015). "GRIN Taxonomy for Plants". Germplasm Resources Information Network.
