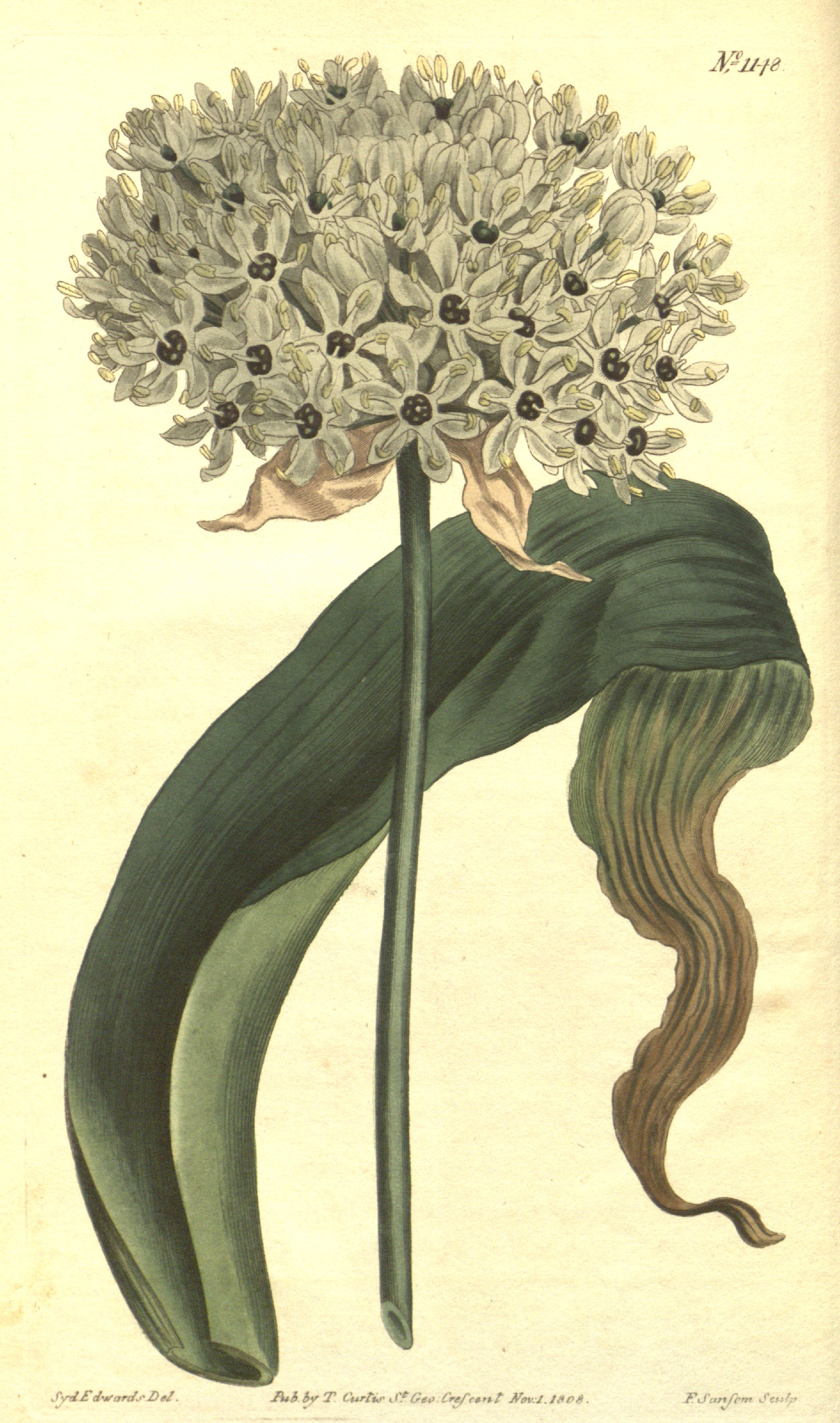
- 1809 illustration (as Allium magicum)

Scientific classification
- Kingdom: Plantae
- Clade: Tracheophytes
- Clade: Angiosperms
- Clade: Monocots
- Order: Asparagales
- Family: Amaryllidaceae
- Subfamily: Allioideae
- Genus: Allium
- Subgenus: Allium subg. Melanocrommyum
- Species: A. nigrum

Binomial name
- Allium nigrum L., not All. (1785) nor Sm. (1823) nor M. Bieb. (1808)

Synonyms
- Synonymy: Allium afrum (Zucc.) Kunth; Allium bauerianum Baker; Allium cyrilli var. magicum (L.) Nyman; Allium littoreum G.Don; Allium magicum L.; Allium multibulbosum Jacq.; Allium nigrum f. album Maire; Allium nigrum f. roseum Maire; Allium odorum Ten. 1811, illegitimate homonym not L. 1767; Allium paniculatum Viv. 1824, illegitimate homonym not L. 1759; Allium paucibulbosum (Haw.) Steud.; Canidia magica (L.) Salisb.; Kalabotis nigrum (L.) Raf.; Molium nigrum (L.) Haw.; Molium paucibulbosum Haw.; Ophioscorodon magicum (L.) Wallr.; Ornithogalum afrum Zucc.

= Allium nigrum =

Black garlic

Species of flowering plant

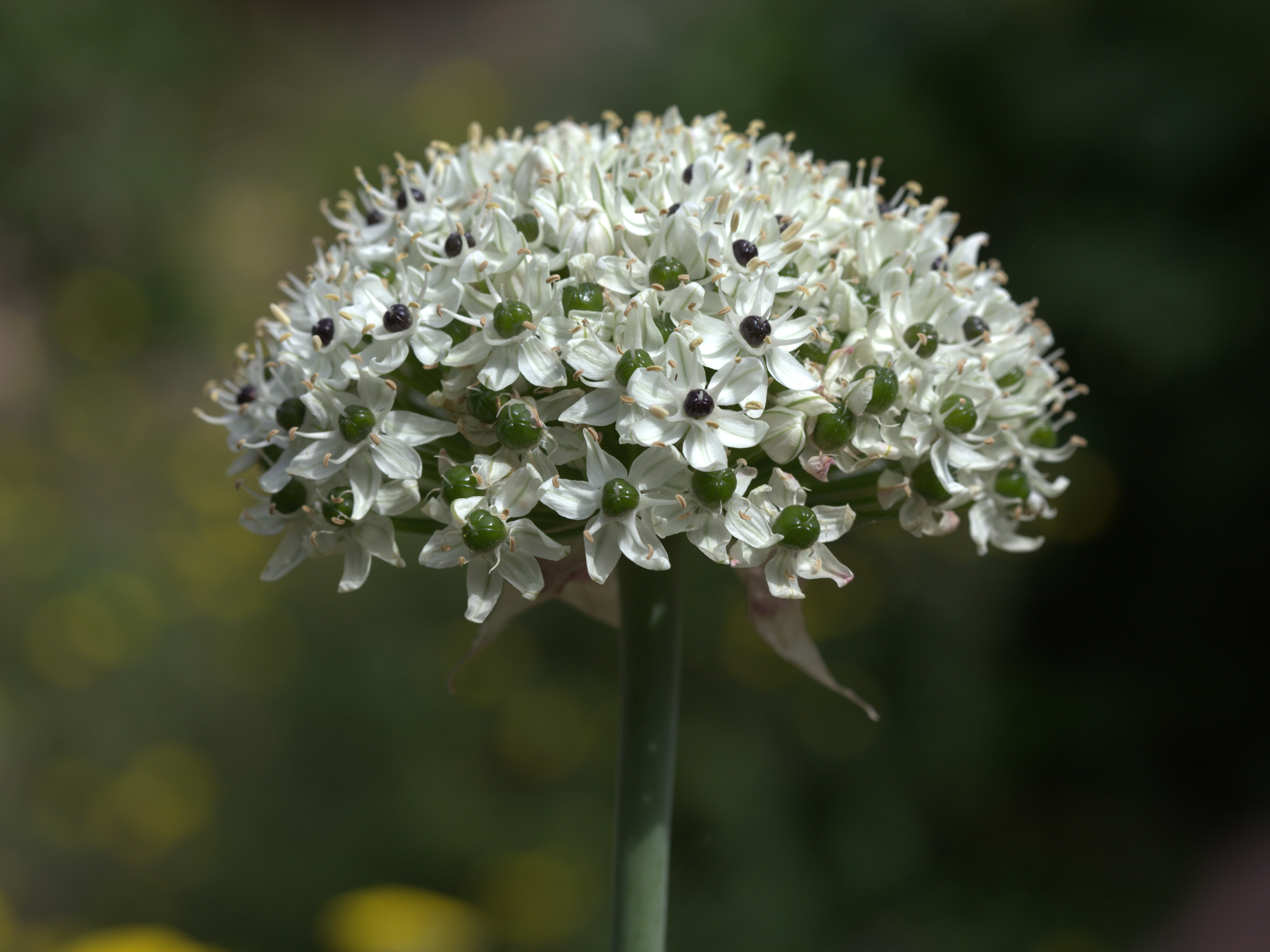
Inflorescence

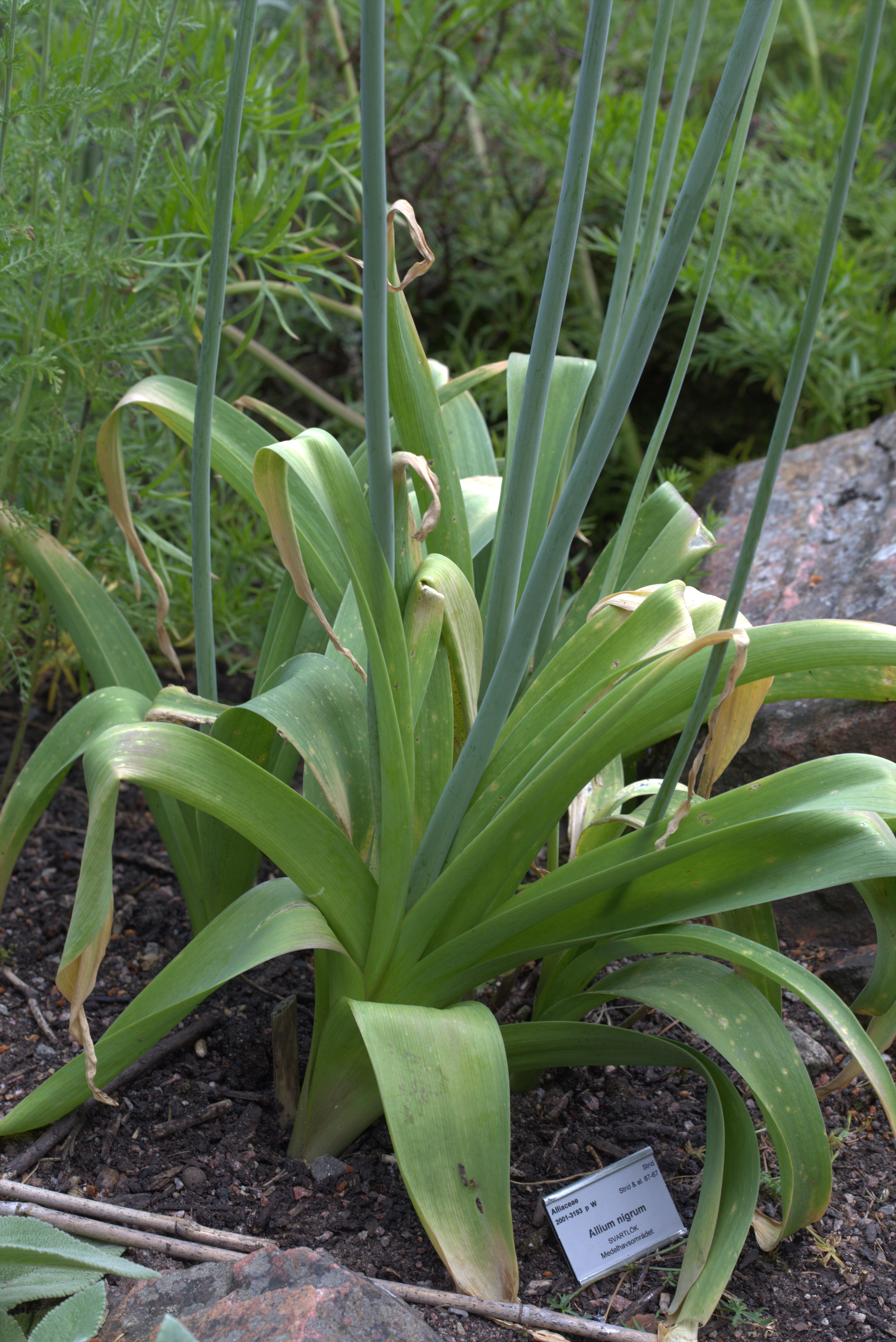
Leaves and stem

Allium nigrum, common name black garlic, broad-leaved leek, or broadleaf garlic, is a Middle Eastern species of wild onion. It lacks the onion or garlic scent shared by most of the other species in the group. The species is native to Turkey, Cyprus, Syria, Lebanon, and the Palestine region but cultivated as an ornamental in many other places. It has become naturalized in some regions, including parts of the United States (especially Washington and Oregon).

== Description ==
Allium nigrum produces asymmetric bulbs up to 5 cm across. Each plant has 3-6 leaves, lanceolate in shape, flat and bent to the side, up to 60 cm long and 2.5 cm across. Later the leaves become reflexed. Scapes are smooth and round in cross-section, 80–100 cm tall. The scape carries a dense umbellate inflorescence with star-like flowers up to 9 mm across; the tepals are white with a green midvein; the anthers are purple or yellow. The ovaries are black-green (but flushed with red in the Levant) in anthesis, but green when younger or following anthesis.

== Taxonomy ==
It is the type species of Subgenus (Section) Melanocrommyum. Molecular evidence suggests that A. nigrum is a polymorphous species consisting of several infraspecific groups.

=== Subdivision ===
Alliances:

- Allium nigrum
- Allium asclepiadeum
- Allium orientale

Allium nigrum alliance: Allium nigrum L. and A. multibulbosum Jacq. have often been treated as variants within a variable A. nigrum sensu lato. The type variant, A. nigrum sensu stricto is characterised by rose oblong tepals, rose filaments, and distinctly tri-sulcate, strongly coarse, dull, permanently green ovaries, while A. multibulbosum have white to pinkish-carmine, oblong tepals, filaments of the same color as tepals, but rounded, narrowly hexasulcate, smooth and commonly glossy ovaries. The latter commonly turn green from black, but some are permanently green. These variants are in a sister group relationship. The World Checklist of Selected Plant Families (WCLSPF) treat these as separate species.

However, Allium basalticum has been considered sufficiently distinct on molecular grounds, to be recognised as a new separate species. Another distinct species is Allium dumetorum.

Allium asclepiadeum alliance: Allium asclepiadeum Bornm. was initially considered a separate species, but then submerged in A. nigrum. It has again been treated as a separate species based on molecular data, but under the new name of Allium meronense Fragman & R.M. Fritsch. WCLSPF, while accepting this new species, have retained A. asclepiadeum as a separate species.

Allium orientale alliance: descriptions of Allium orientale Boiss. have varied, resulting in the name being applied to a variety of different plants, a concept not supported by molecular data which indicate Allium israeliticum Fragman & R.M. Fritsch, as a distinct new species. WCLSPF recognises both as distinct species.

=== Etymology ===
The name nigrum (Latin: black) is derived from the colour of the ovaries.

== Uses ==
The plant is a frequent ornamental in European and North American gardens, having been introduced in the early twentieth century. It is produced in Taean and Seosan in South Korea.

== Bibliography ==
- Fragman-Sapir, Ori; Fritsch, Reinhard M. (2011). "New species of Allium sect. Melanocrommyum from the eastern Mediterranean" (PDF). Herbertia. 65: 31–50. Archived from the original (PDF) on 2016-09-23.
- Fritsch, RM; Gurushidze, M; Jedelská, J; Keusgen, M (2006). "More than a pretty face - ornamental "drumstick onions" of Allium subg. Melanocrommyum are also potential medicinal plants". Herbertia. 60: 26–59.
- Fritsch, RM; Blattner, FR; Gurushidze, M (2010). "New classification of Allium L. subg. Melanocrommyum (Webb & Berthel) Rouy (Alliaceae) based on molecular and morphological characters". Phyton. 49: 145–220.
- "World Checklist of Selected Plant Families". Royal Botanic Gardens, Kew.
