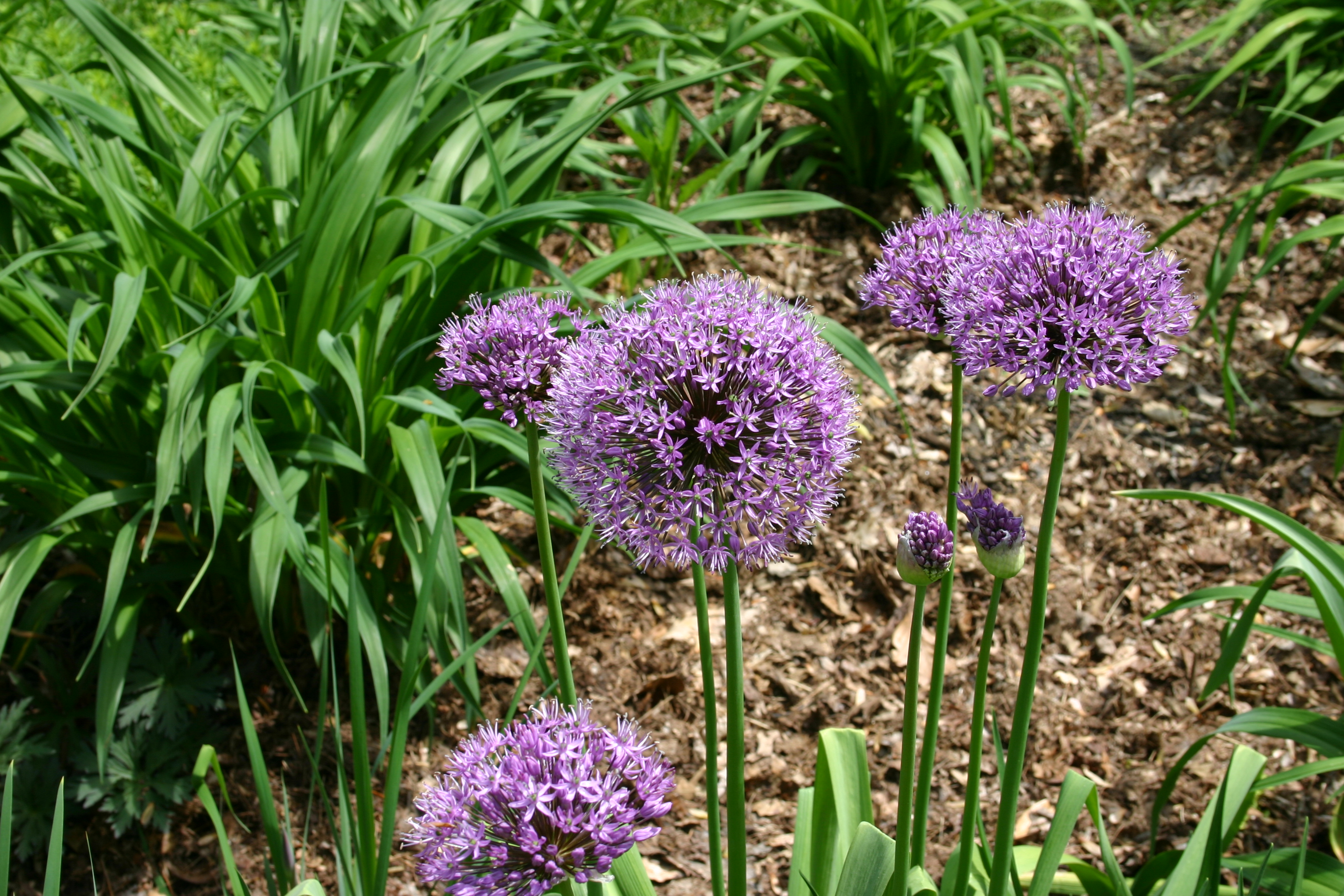

Scientific classification
- Kingdom: Plantae
- Clade: Tracheophytes
- Clade: Angiosperms
- Clade: Monocots
- Order: Asparagales
- Family: Amaryllidaceae
- Subfamily: Allioideae
- Genus: Allium
- Subgenus: Allium subg. Melanocrommyum
- Species: A. aflatunense

Binomial name
- Allium aflatunense B. Fedtsch.

= Allium aflatunense =

Species of flowering plant

Allium aflatunense is a species of plant in the amaryllis family, native to Kazakhstan and Kyrgyzstan in Central Asia. In other regions, it is commonly grown as a garden plant.

== Description ==
Allium aflatunense is a 0.9 m (36 in) tall bulbous perennial plant with basal, straplike leaves, and hollow, slightly ribbed scapes (flower stems). The flower heads are dense, globular umbels, about 10 cm (4 in) across, made up of numerous star-shaped, purplish-pink flowers. It flowers in May and June, with seeds ripening in August. It is commonly sold as a bulb.

A. aflatunense is often confused with A. hollandicum.

== Cultivation ==
Allium aflatunense is generally hardy in USDA zones 4–8. The plant is suitable for use as a cut flower. While it prefers alkaline soil, it can tolerate poor soil conditions, as well as part shade (though it does best in full sun).
