= Wild garlic =

Plant species in the genus Allium known as wild garlic include the following:

- Allium canadense, wild onion
- Allium carinatum, keeled garlic
- Allium drummondii, Drummond's onion
- Allium ochotense, Siberian onion
- Allium oleraceum, field garlic
- Allium paradoxum, few-flowered garlic or few-flowered leek
- Allium triquetrum, three-cornered leek
- Allium ursinum, ramsons, native to British and European woodlands
- Allium vineale, crow garlic
- Allium macrostemon (野蒜, ノビル), native to East Asian woodlands

Wild garlic is also a common name for plants in the genus Tulbaghia.

== See also ==
- Wild onion
- Alliaria petiolata
