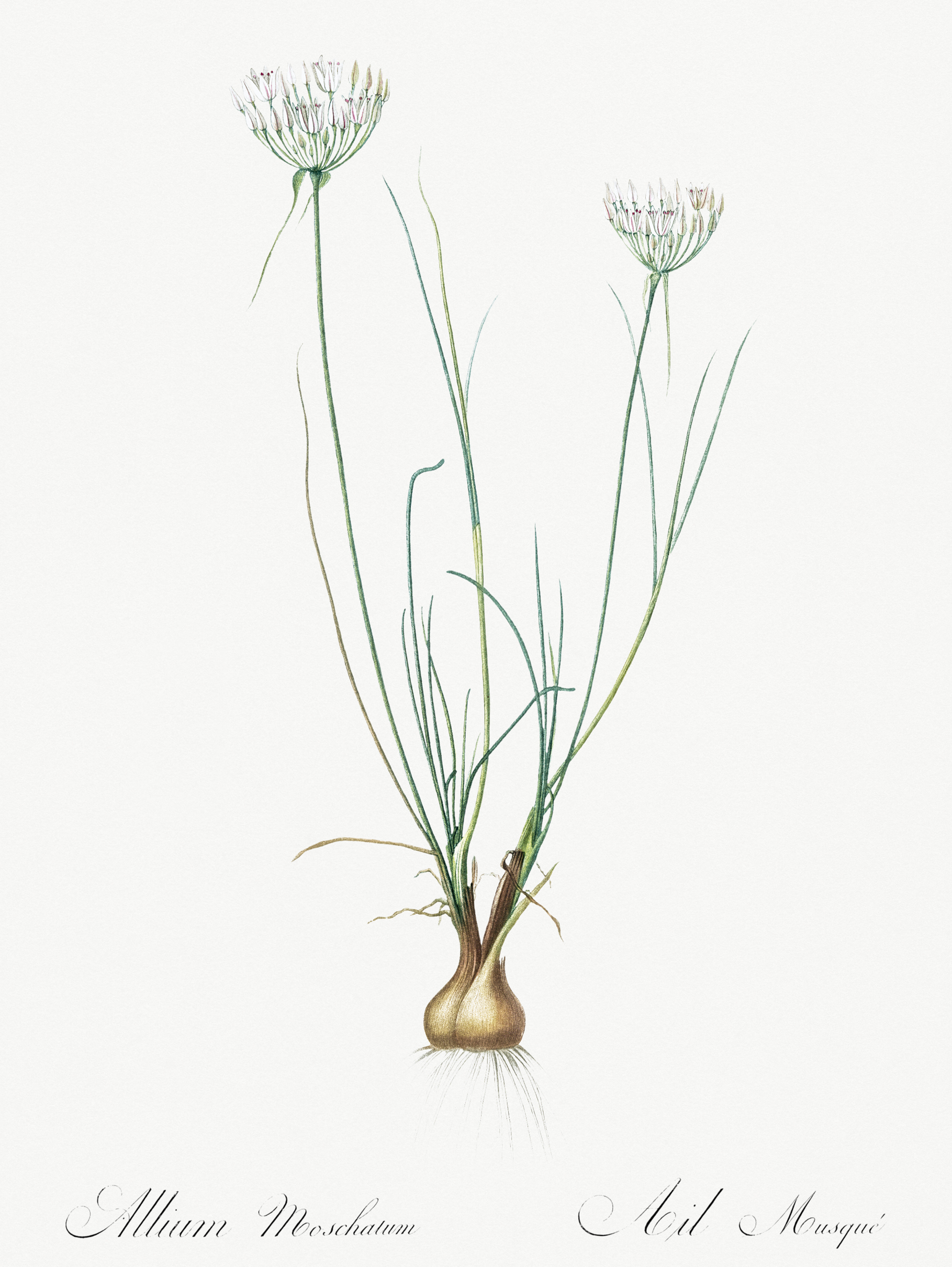
- Allium moschatum illustration from Les liliacées (1805) by Pierre-Joseph Redouté

Scientific classification
- Kingdom: Plantae
- Clade: Tracheophytes
- Clade: Angiosperms
- Clade: Monocots
- Order: Asparagales
- Family: Amaryllidaceae
- Subfamily: Allioideae
- Genus: Allium
- Subgenus: A. subg. Polyprason
- Species: A. moschatum

Binomial name
- Allium moschatum L. 1753 not d'Urv. 1822 nor Moris 1827 nor Sint. ex Regel 1875

Synonyms
- Species synonymy: Allium capillare Cav.; Allium cupani Guss; Allium moschatum var. borzhomicum Miscz. ex Grossh.; Allium setaceum Waldst. & Kit.; Scorodon moschatum (L.) Fourr.

= Allium moschatum =

Fly garlic

Species of flowering plant

Allium moschatum is a Eurasian species of wild onion with a range extending from Spain to Iran.

Allium moschatum is a bulb-forming perennial. Flowers are born in umbels on top of thin, wiry scapes rarely more than 15 cm tall; tepals white with a thin but prominent purple midvein.

It usually grows in clearings of bushes, dry pastures and stony environments.

Formerly included

- Allium moschatum var. brevipedunculatum, now called Allium korolkowii
- Allium moschatum var. dubium, now called Allium korolkowii
