= A. nigrum =

A. nigrum may refer to:

- Acer nigrum, the black maple, a tree species
- Allium nigrum, the black garlic, broadleaf garlic, an ornamental plant species

== See also ==
- List of Latin and Greek words commonly used in systematic names#N
