= Allium basalticum =

Scientific classification
- Kingdom: Plantae
- Clade: Tracheophytes
- Clade: Angiosperms
- Clade: Monocots
- Order: Asparagales
- Family: Amaryllidaceae
- Subfamily: Allioideae
- Genus: Allium
- Species: A. basalticum

Binomial name
- Allium basalticum Fragman & R.M.Fritsch

Species of flowering plant

Allium basalticum is a plant species found in Israel, Jordan, and Lebanon, and formerly considered under Allium nigrum. Bulbs are egg-shaped, up to 30 mm long. Scape is straight, round in cross-section, up to 60 cm tall. Leaves are narrowly lanceolate, up to 50 cm long. Tepals are white with conspicuous green midveins; anthers yellow; ovary deep purple at flowering time, later turning green.

== Bibliography ==
- Fragman-Sapir, Ori; Fritsch, Reinhard M. (2011). "New species of Allium sect. Melanocrommyum from the eastern Mediterranean" (PDF). Herbertia. 65: 31–50. Archived from the original (PDF) on 2016-09-23.
