= C4H9NO2S =

The molecular formula C_{4}H_{9}NO_{2}S may refer to:

- Homocysteine, a non-proteinogenic α-amino acid
- S-Methylcysteine, amino acid with the nominal formula CH_{3}SCH_{2}CH(NH_{2})CO_{2}H; the S-methylated derivative of cysteine
