= 2-Methylthioethylamine =

Names
- Preferred IUPAC name 2-(Methylsulfanyl)ethan-1-amine
- Other names 2-(Methylthio)ethylamine; 2-Aminoethyl methyl sulfide; S-Methylcysteamine

Identifiers
CAS Number	18542-42-2
3D model (JSmol)	Interactive image
ChemSpider	79116
ECHA InfoCard	100.038.541
EC Number	242-412-5
PubChem CID	87697
UNII	A9H8PF5P28
CompTox Dashboard (EPA)	DTXSID50171774
- InChI: InChI=1S/C3H9NS/c1-5-3-2-4/h2-4H2,1H3 Key: CYWGSFFHHMQKET-UHFFFAOYSA-N
- SMILES: CSCCN

Properties
Chemical formula	C_{3}H_{9}NS
Molar mass	91.17 g·mol^{−1}
Appearance	Colorless liquid
Boiling point	146–148 °C (295–298 °F; 419–421 K)

Hazards
- GHS labelling
Pictograms	(GHS02: Flammable) (GHS05: Corrosive)
Signal word	Danger
Hazard statements	H226, H314
Precautionary statements	P210, P233, P240, P241, P242, P243, P260, P264, P280, P301+P330+P331, P303+P361+P353, P304+P340, P305+P351+P338, P310, P321, P363, P370+P378, P403+P235, P405, P501
- Except where otherwise noted, data are given for materials in their standard state (at 25 °C [77 °F], 100 kPa). Infobox references

2-Methylthioethylamine is the organosulfur compound with the formula CH_{3}SCH_{2}CH_{2}NH_{2}. It is a colorless liquid. It can be viewed as the product of S-methylation of cysteamine or decarboxylation of S-methylcysteine. The compound is a ligand and, via Schiff base condensations, a ligand precursor.
