= A. giganteum =

A. giganteum may refer to:

- Allium giganteum, the giant onion, a perennial edible medicinal plant species
- Arsinoitherium giganteum, an extinct mammal species that lived in Ethiopia 27 million years ago

== See also ==
- Giganteum
