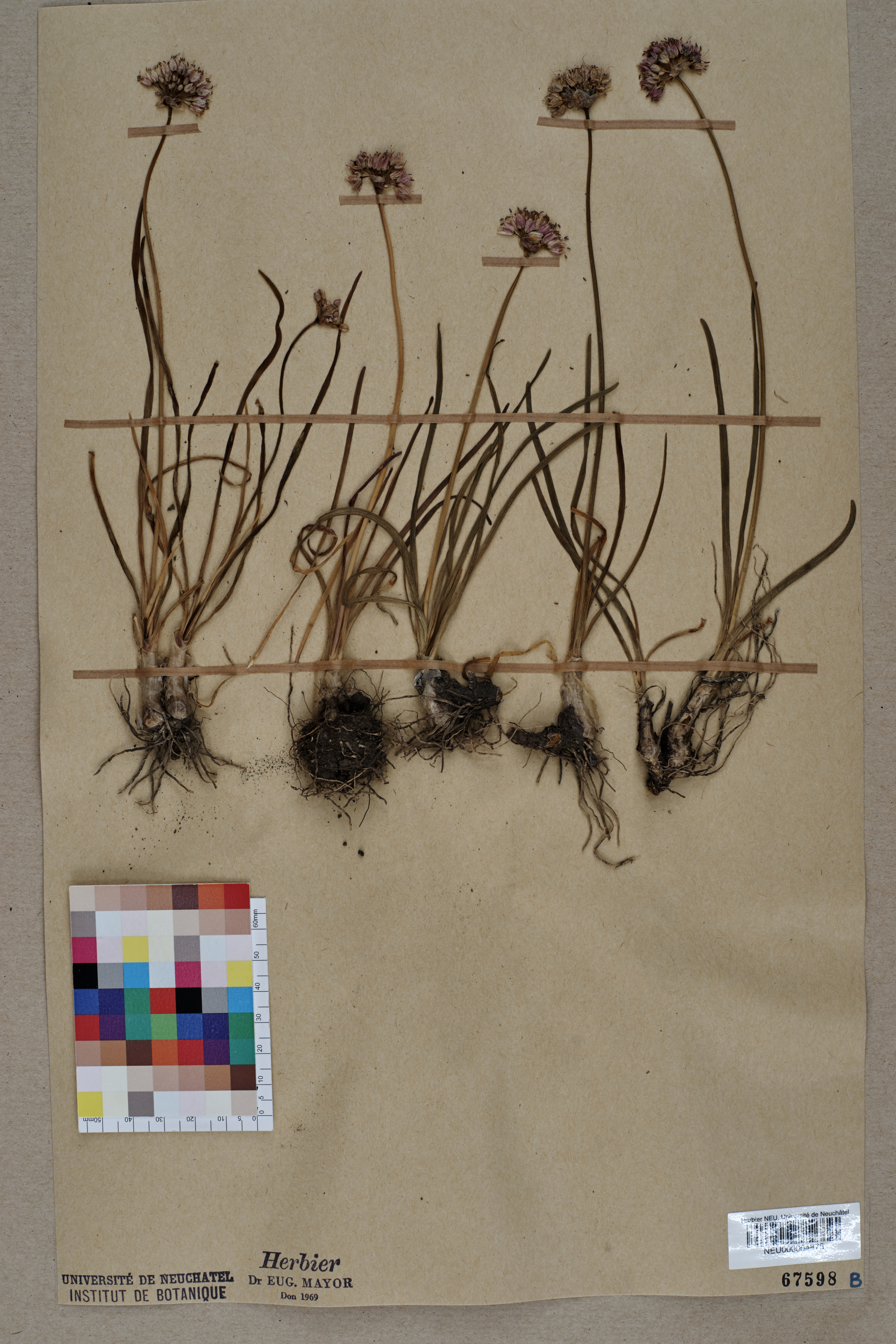
- Herbarium specimen of Allium lineare

Scientific classification
- Kingdom: Plantae
- Clade: Tracheophytes
- Clade: Angiosperms
- Clade: Monocots
- Order: Asparagales
- Family: Amaryllidaceae
- Subfamily: Allioideae
- Genus: Allium
- Subgenus: A. subg. Reticulatobulbosa
- Species: A. lineare

Binomial name
- Allium lineare L. 1753 not Mill. 1768 nor Ten. 1811 nor Willd. ex Kunth 1843

Synonyms
- Allium christii Janka; Allium confertum Fisch.; Allium deflexum Willd.; Allium halleri Crantz; Allium tortuosum Willd. ex Schult. & Schult.f.; Porrum lineare (L.) Raf.

= Allium lineare =

Species of flowering plant

Allium lineare is a Eurasian species of wild onions with a wide range extending from France to Mongolia.

Allium lineare has one or two bulbs each up to 15 cm across. Scape is up to 60 cm tall. Leaves are flat, shorter than the scape, very narrow, rarely more than 5 mm across. Flowers red.

formerly included

- Allium lineare var. maackii Maxim., now called Allium maackii (Maxim.) Prokh. ex Kom.
- Allium lineare var. strictum (Schrad.) Trevir., now called Allium strictum Schrad.
