= Allium maackii =

马克韭 ma ke jiu

Scientific classification
- Kingdom: Plantae
- Clade: Tracheophytes
- Clade: Angiosperms
- Clade: Monocots
- Order: Asparagales
- Family: Amaryllidaceae
- Subfamily: Allioideae
- Genus: Allium
- Species: A. maackii

Binomial name
- Allium maackii (Maxim.) Prokh. ex Kom.

Synonyms
- Homotypic Synonyms: Allium lineare var. maackii Maxim.; Heterotypic Synonyms: Allium prokhanovii (Vorosch.) Barkalov; Allium splendens subsp. prokhanovii Vorosch.

Species of flowering plant

Allium maackii is a species of wild onion in the family Amaryllidaceae. It is native to northeastern Asia (Heilongjiang, Amur Oblast, Primorye, Khabarovsk, Sakhalin, Kuril Islands). It is found on cliff and steep hillsides at elevations of 200–500 m.

Allium maackii has cylindrical to egg-shaped bulbs up to 15 mm across. Scapes are up to 50 cm tall. Leaves are flat and narrow. Umbel has many flowers crowded together, each rose pink with a dark purple midstripe.
