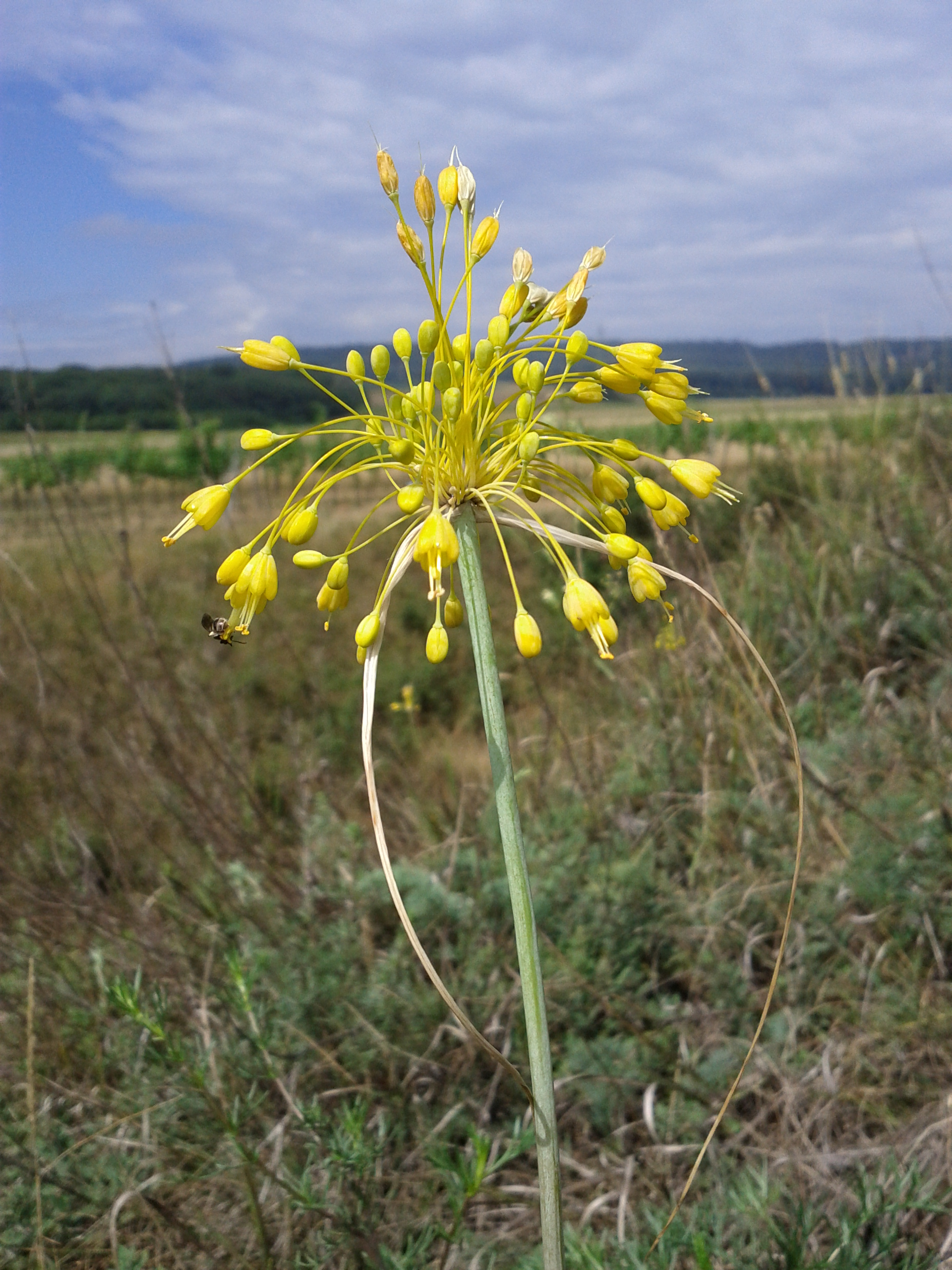

Conservation status
- Least Concern (IUCN 3.1)

Scientific classification
- Kingdom: Plantae
- Clade: Tracheophytes
- Clade: Angiosperms
- Clade: Monocots
- Order: Asparagales
- Family: Amaryllidaceae
- Subfamily: Allioideae
- Genus: Allium
- Subgenus: A. subg. Allium
- Species: A. flavum

Binomial name
- Allium flavum L.

Synonyms
- List: Allium montanum Rchb. 1848, illegitimate homonym not F.W. Schmidt 1794; Allium nitschmannii Willd. ex Ledeb.; Allium pallens Rchb. 1848, illegitimate homonym not L. 1762; Allium paniculatum All. 1785, illegitimate homonym not L. 1759; Allium ruthenicum Steud.; Allium valdense Nyman; Allium valdensium Reut.; Allium webbii Clementi; Cepa flava (L.) Moench; Codonoprasum flavum (L.) Rchb.; Codonoprasum flexum Rchb.; Codonoprasum pallens Rchb.; Kalabotis flavum (L.) Raf.; Allium tauricum (Besser ex Rchb.) Grossh.; Allium aristatum Candargy; Allium paczoskianum Tuzson; Allium callistemon Webb ex Regel; Allium sphaeropodum Klokov; Allium villosiusculum Seregin; Allium pseudopulchellum Omelczuk; Allium fontanesii J.Gay; Allium amphipulchellum Zahar.

= Allium flavum =

Species of flowering plant

Allium flavum, the small yellow onion or yellow-flowered garlic, is a species of flowering plant in the genus Allium. A bulbous herbaceous perennial, it is native to the lands surrounding the Mediterranean, Black, and Caspian Seas, from areas like France and Morocco to Iran and Kazakhstan.

== Description ==
Allium flavum produces one bulb, and a scape up to 40 cm tall. The umbel contains bright yellow, bell shaped flowers with a pleasing scent. The Latin species epithet flavum means "yellow", referring to its flower colour. It flowers between June and July and is hardy to USDA zones 4 to 8.

In cultivation in the UK, Allium flavum has gained the Royal Horticultural Society's Award of Garden Merit.

== Varieties and subspecies ==
Numerous names have been proposed but only the following are accepted by the World Checklist

- Allium flavum subsp. flavum - Turkey, central + southern Europe
- Allium flavum subsp. ionochlorum Maire - Algeria, Morocco
- Allium flavum var. minus Boiss. - Turkey
- Allium flavum var. pilosum Kollmann & Koyuncu - Adana Province in Turkey
- Allium flavum subsp. tauricum (Besser ex Rchb.) K.Richt - Middle East, Greece, Romania, Ukraine, European Russia, Caucasus, Kazakhstan
