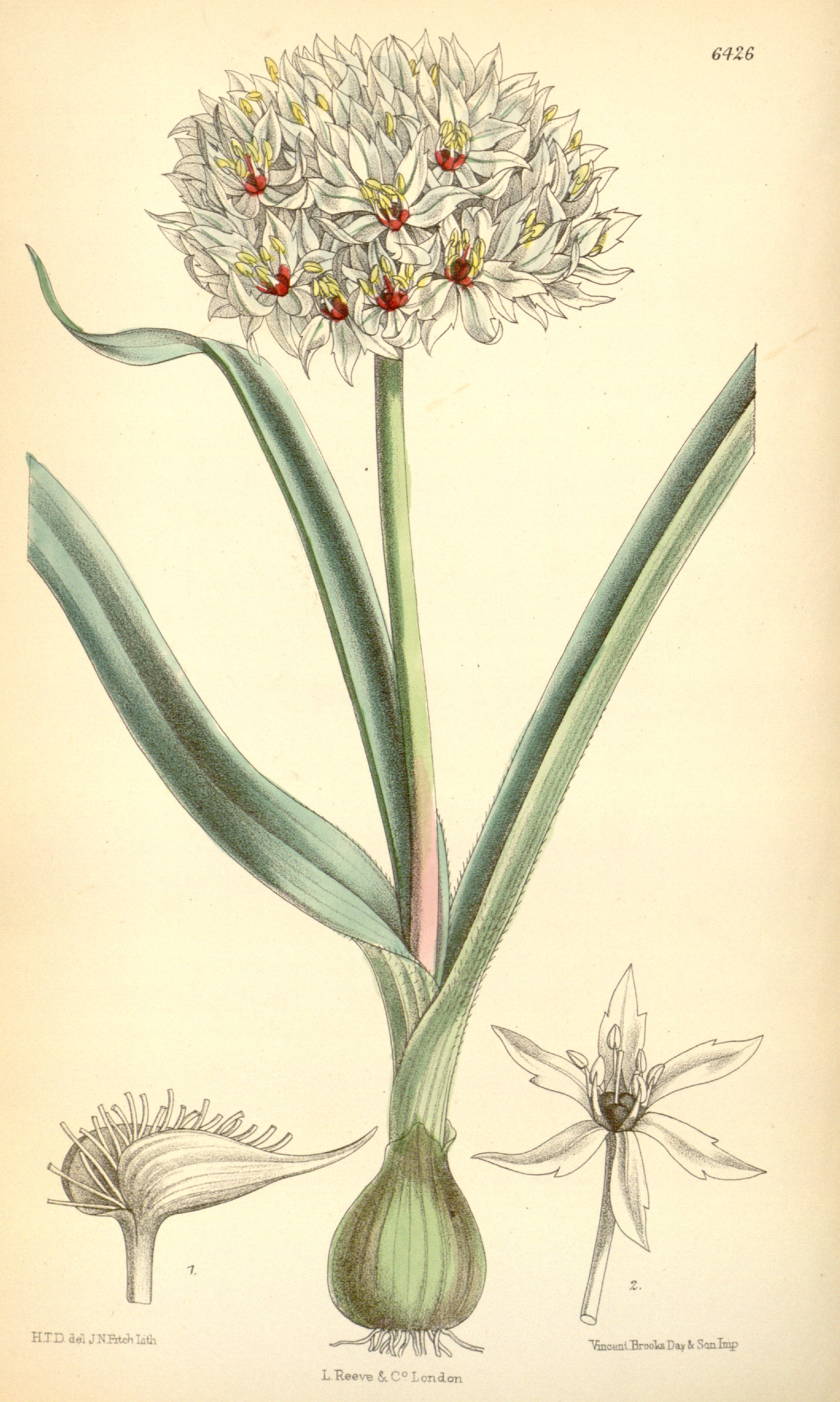
- Botanical illustration

Scientific classification
- Kingdom: Plantae
- Clade: Embryophytes
- Clade: Tracheophytes
- Clade: Spermatophytes
- Clade: Angiosperms
- Clade: Monocots
- Order: Asparagales
- Family: Amaryllidaceae
- Subfamily: Allioideae
- Genus: Allium
- Subgenus: Allium subg. Melanocrommyum
- Species: A. orientale

Binomial name
- Allium orientale Boiss.

Synonyms
- List: Allium erdelii Baker; Allium gayi Boiss.; Allium macrospermum Boiss. & Kotschy

= Allium orientale =

Species of flowering plant

Allium orientale is a species of wild garlic/onion native to the eastern Mediterranean; Libya, Egypt, Sinai, the Levant, Cyprus and Anatolia. It has high genetic variation but is not widely distributed, suggesting that it may contain cryptic species.
