= Allium dregeanum =

Scientific classification
- Kingdom: Plantae
- Clade: Tracheophytes
- Clade: Angiosperms
- Clade: Monocots
- Order: Asparagales
- Family: Amaryllidaceae
- Subfamily: Allioideae
- Genus: Allium
- Subgenus: A. subg. Allium
- Species: A. dregeanum

Binomial name
- Allium dregeanum Kunth

Species of flowering plant

Allium dregeanum is the sole known species of Allium endemic to sub-Saharan Africa. It has also been described as the only Allium species endemic to the Southern Hemisphere, though some descriptions of the genus also include Allium juncifolium (Chile) and Allium sellovianum (Brazil), which are much less studied than Allium dregeanum. The distribution of Allium dregeanum extends from the summer-rainfall region, into the winter-rainfall zone of South Africa. Since Allium species are almost exclusively found in the Northern Hemisphere, with major centers of diversity in Central Asia and western North America, the biogeographical history of Allium dregeanum is of interest.

Though some theories have been put forward, no explanation for the geographic isolation of Allium dregeanum has been confirmed. In 1976, De Wilde-Dufyes proposed that Allium dregeanum is a modification of the European species Allium ampeloprasum, and may have been brought to South Africa by early European settlers. De Saarker et al. contradicted this theory in 1997, when they explored genetic similarities between Allium dregeanum and Allium ampeloprasum, and did not find evidence of a significant genetic relationship. They also point to evidence that Allium dregeanum was already established in South Africa in the mid-17th century, when the first Dutch settlers colonized South Africa, but do not suggest other explanations for Allium dregeanum's isolation.

Allium dregeanum occurs at elevations of 100-1000m, and flowers in spring and early summer (October to December). It can grow to 0.6m by 0.2m, growing best in well-drained soils in sunny areas. Allium dregeanum is also notable for its high chromosome counts: polyploidy is not uncommon in Allium, with 14% of representative Allium species exhibiting more than two sets of chromosomes, but Allium dregeanum has particularly high ploidy levels, and can be octoploid or decaploid.
