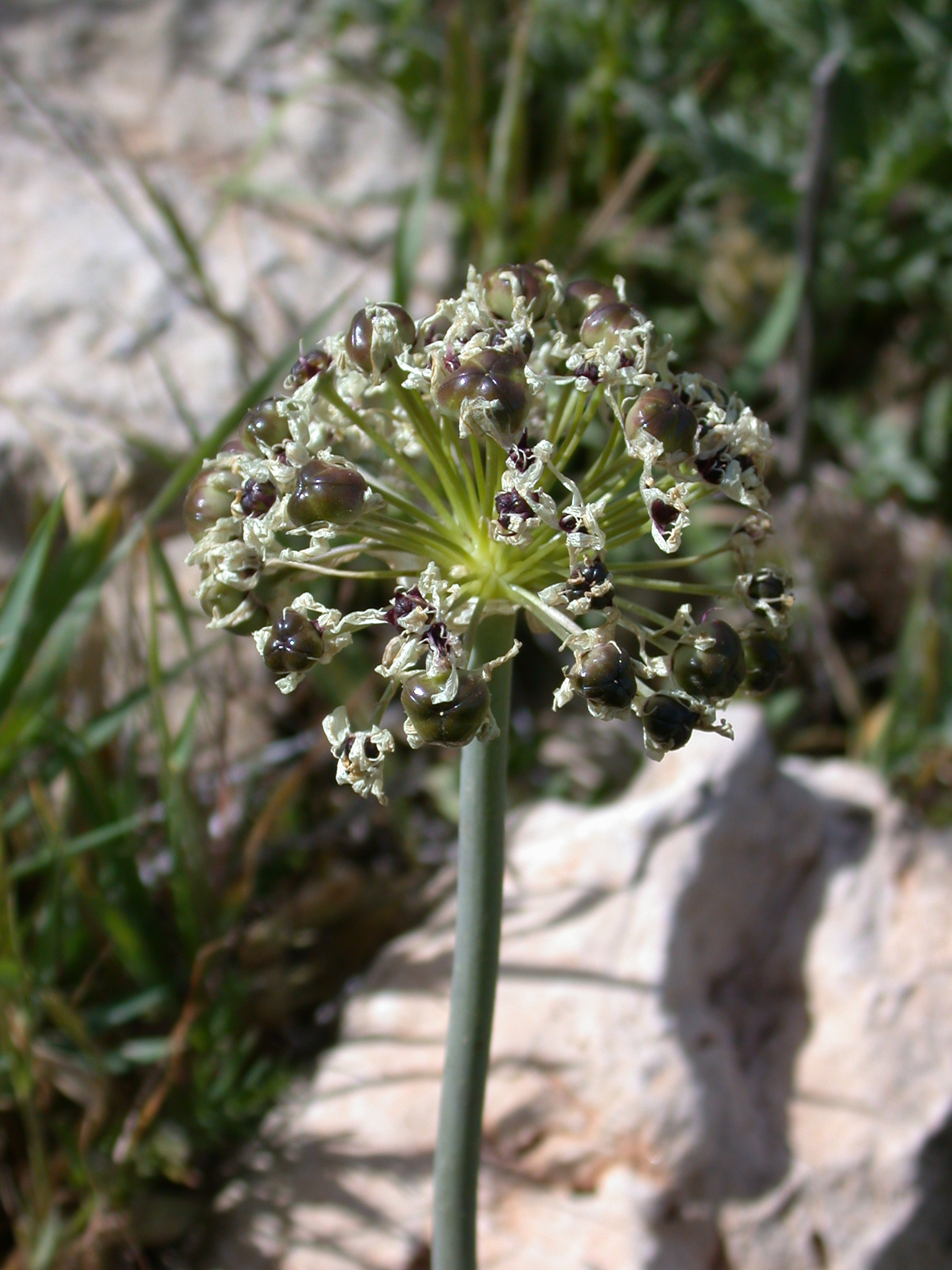

Scientific classification
- Kingdom: Plantae
- Clade: Tracheophytes
- Clade: Angiosperms
- Clade: Monocots
- Order: Asparagales
- Family: Amaryllidaceae
- Subfamily: Allioideae
- Genus: Allium
- Species: A. meronense

Binomial name
- Allium meronense Fragman & R.M.Fritsch

= Allium meronense =

Species of flowering plant

Allium meronense is a plant species found in Israel and Lebanon. Bulbs are egg-shaped, up to 30 mm long. Scape is flexuous or ascendant, up to 25 cm long. Leaves are narrowly lanceolate, up to 30 cm long. Tepals are white with faint green midveins; anthers yellow; ovary deep purple.
