= Allium rosenorum =

Scientific classification
- Kingdom: Plantae
- Clade: Embryophytes
- Clade: Tracheophytes
- Clade: Spermatophytes
- Clade: Angiosperms
- Clade: Monocots
- Order: Asparagales
- Family: Amaryllidaceae
- Subfamily: Allioideae
- Genus: Allium
- Subgenus: Allium subg. Melanocrommyum
- Species: A. rosenorum

Binomial name
- Allium rosenorum R.M.Fritsch

Species of flowering plant

Allium rosenorum is a species of wild onion native to Tajikistan and Uzbekistan. Its 'Michael H. Hoog' cultivar has gained the Royal Horticultural Society's Award of Garden Merit as an ornamental, and is also considered by them as a good plant to attract pollinators.
