= Allium israeliticum =

Scientific classification
- Kingdom: Plantae
- Clade: Tracheophytes
- Clade: Angiosperms
- Clade: Monocots
- Order: Asparagales
- Family: Amaryllidaceae
- Subfamily: Allioideae
- Genus: Allium
- Species: A. israeliticum

Binomial name
- Allium israeliticum Fragman & R.M.Fritsch

Species of flowering plant

Allium israeliticum is a species of onion native to Israel, Palestine and Jordan. Bulbs are egg-shaped, up to 30 mm long. Scape is flexuous, up to 40 cm long. Leaves are thick, recurved, up to 30 cm long, tapering toward the tip. Tepals are translucent white with green midveins; anthers yellow; ovary green.
