= Allium neriniflorum =

Scientific classification
- Kingdom: Plantae
- Clade: Tracheophytes
- Clade: Angiosperms
- Clade: Monocots
- Order: Asparagales
- Family: Amaryllidaceae
- Subfamily: Allioideae
- Genus: Allium
- Subgenus: A. subg. Caloscordum
- Species: A. neriniflorum

Binomial name
- Allium neriniflorum (Herb.) G. Don

Synonyms
- Allium neriniflorum f. albiflorum (Kitag.) Q.S.Sun; Caloscordum neriniflorum Herb.; Caloscordum neriniflorum f. albiflorum (Kitag.) Kitag.; Geboscon neriniflorum (Herb.) House; Nothoscordum neriniflorum (Herb.) Benth. & Hook.f.; Nothoscordum neriniflorum var. albiflorum Kitag.

Species of flowering plant

Allium neriniflorum is a species of wild onion in the family Amaryllidaceae. It is native to Mongolia, the Zabaykalsky Krai region of Siberia, and northern China (Inner Mongolia, Hebei, Heilongjiang, Jilin, Liaoning). It grows on coastal sand dunes, wet meadows, hillsides, etc., at elevations up to 2000 m.

Allium neriniflorum produces one round or egg-shaped bulb up to 2 cm (2/3 in) in diameter. Scape is up to 50 cm (20 in) tall. Leaves are round in cross-section, hollow, about the same length as the scape. Umbels contain only a few flowers, usually red or red-violet but sometimes white.
