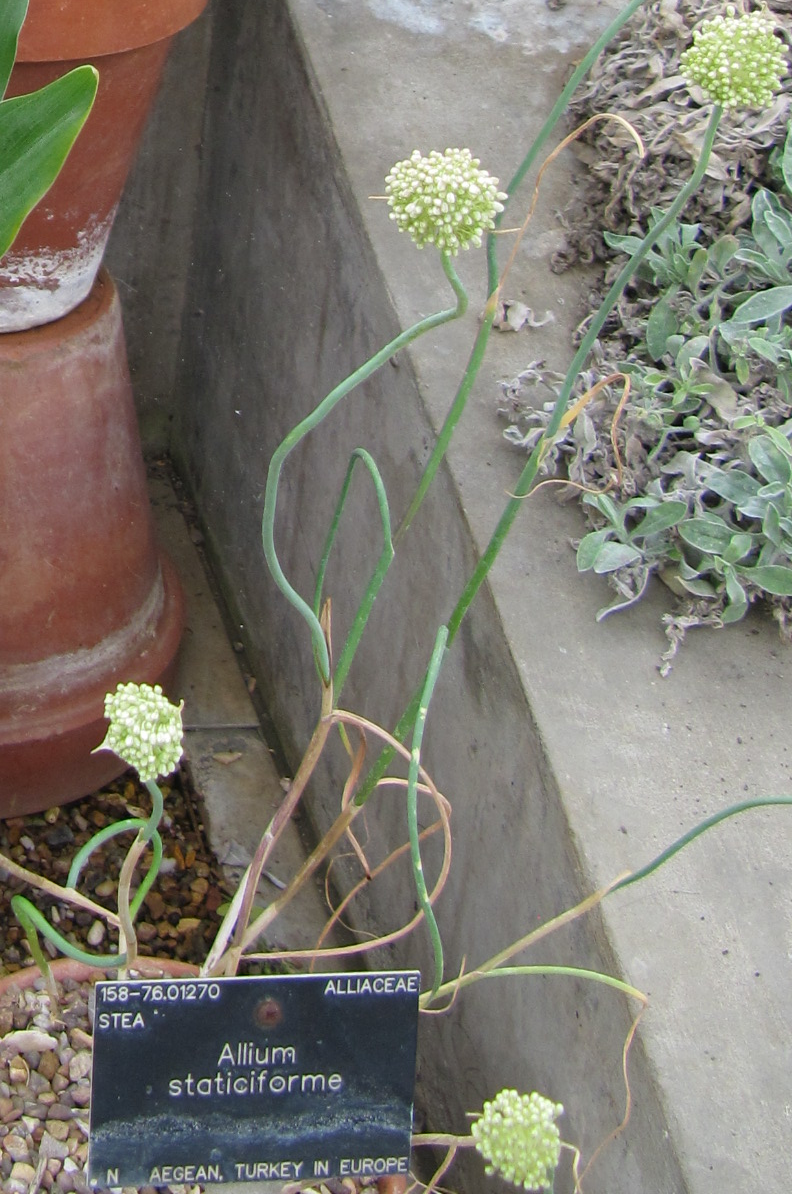
- Allium staticiforme at Kew Gardens

Scientific classification
- Kingdom: Plantae
- Clade: Embryophytes
- Clade: Tracheophytes
- Clade: Angiosperms
- Clade: Monocots
- Order: Asparagales
- Family: Amaryllidaceae
- Subfamily: Allioideae
- Genus: Allium
- Species: A. staticiforme

Binomial name
- Allium staticiforme Sibth. & Sm.

Synonyms
- Allium flexuosum d'Urv. 1822 not Host 1827; Allium margaritaceum Heldr. ex Regel 1875, illegitimate homonym not Sm. 1809 nor Moench 1802; Allium phalereum Heldr. & Sart.; Allium urvillei Heldr. & Sart.; Allium erythraeum Weiss ex Boiss.; Allium weissii Boiss.; Allium staticiforme f. flexuosum (d'Urv.) Zahar.; Allium staticiforme subsp. flexuosum (d'Urv.) Seregin

= Allium staticiforme =

Species of onion

Allium staticiforme is a species of onion native to Greece and western Turkey, including the islands of the Aegean Sea.
