= Allium spathaceum =

Ethiopian onion

Scientific classification
- Kingdom: Plantae
- Clade: Tracheophytes
- Clade: Angiosperms
- Clade: Monocots
- Order: Asparagales
- Family: Amaryllidaceae
- Subfamily: Allioideae
- Genus: Allium
- Species: A. spathaceum

Binomial name
- Allium spathaceum Steud. ex A.Rich

Synonyms
- Allium subhirsutum var. spathaceum (Steud. ex A.Rich.) Regel; Allium subhirsutum subsp. spathaceum (Steud. ex A.Rich.) Duyfjes

Species of flowering plant

Allium spathaceum, the Ethiopian onion, is a plant species native to Ethiopia, Eritrea, Djibouti, Somalia and Sudan. Of the 900 known species of onion in the world, this is one of only a few that are endemic to the area.

Allium spathaceum is a bulb-forming perennial up to 40 cm tall, with a scent similar to that of onion or leeks. It has very narrow, linear leaves with hairs along the edges. The umbel contains only a few flowers, with long pedicels. Tepals are white with reddish midveins.
