= S-Methylcysteine sulfoxide =

Names
- IUPAC name 2-Amino-3-methylsulfinylpropanoic acid
- Other names methiin, S-methyl-L-cysteine oxide,

Identifiers
CAS Number	4740-94-7
3D model (JSmol)	Interactive image
ChEBI	CHEBI:137271
ChemSpider	74136
PubChem CID	82142
CompTox Dashboard (EPA)	DTXSID70963830
- InChI: InChI=1S/C4H9NO3S/c1-9(8)2-3(5)4(6)7/h3H,2,5H2,1H3,(H,6,7) Key: ZZLHPCSGGOGHFW-UHFFFAOYSA-N
- SMILES: CS(=O)CC(C(=O)O)N

Properties
Chemical formula	C_{4}H_{9}NO_{3}S
Molar mass	151.18 g·mol^{−1}
Appearance	White solid
- Except where otherwise noted, data are given for materials in their standard state (at 25 °C [77 °F], 100 kPa). Infobox references

S-Methylcysteine sulfoxide is an organosulfur compound with the formula CH_{3}S(O)CH_{2}CH(NH_{2})CO_{2}H. It is the sulfoxide of S-methylcysteine. It contributes to the flavor of onions (Allium sp.). The compound is usually encountered as one diastereoisomer, the (R)- and (S)-configurations at the carbon and sulfur stereocenters, respectively. The S-methyl part of the name refers to the location of the methyl group on sulfur. Although odorless, S-methylcysteine sulfoxide is acted upon by alliinase and lachrymatory-factor synthase.

S-Methylcysteine sulfoxide is produced from glutathione.

Related compounds are the unsaturated sulfoxides S-trans-prop-1-enyl cysteine sulfoxide and S-propyl cysteine sulfoxide, both found also in onions, and S-allyl cysteine sulfoxide, typically found in garlic.
