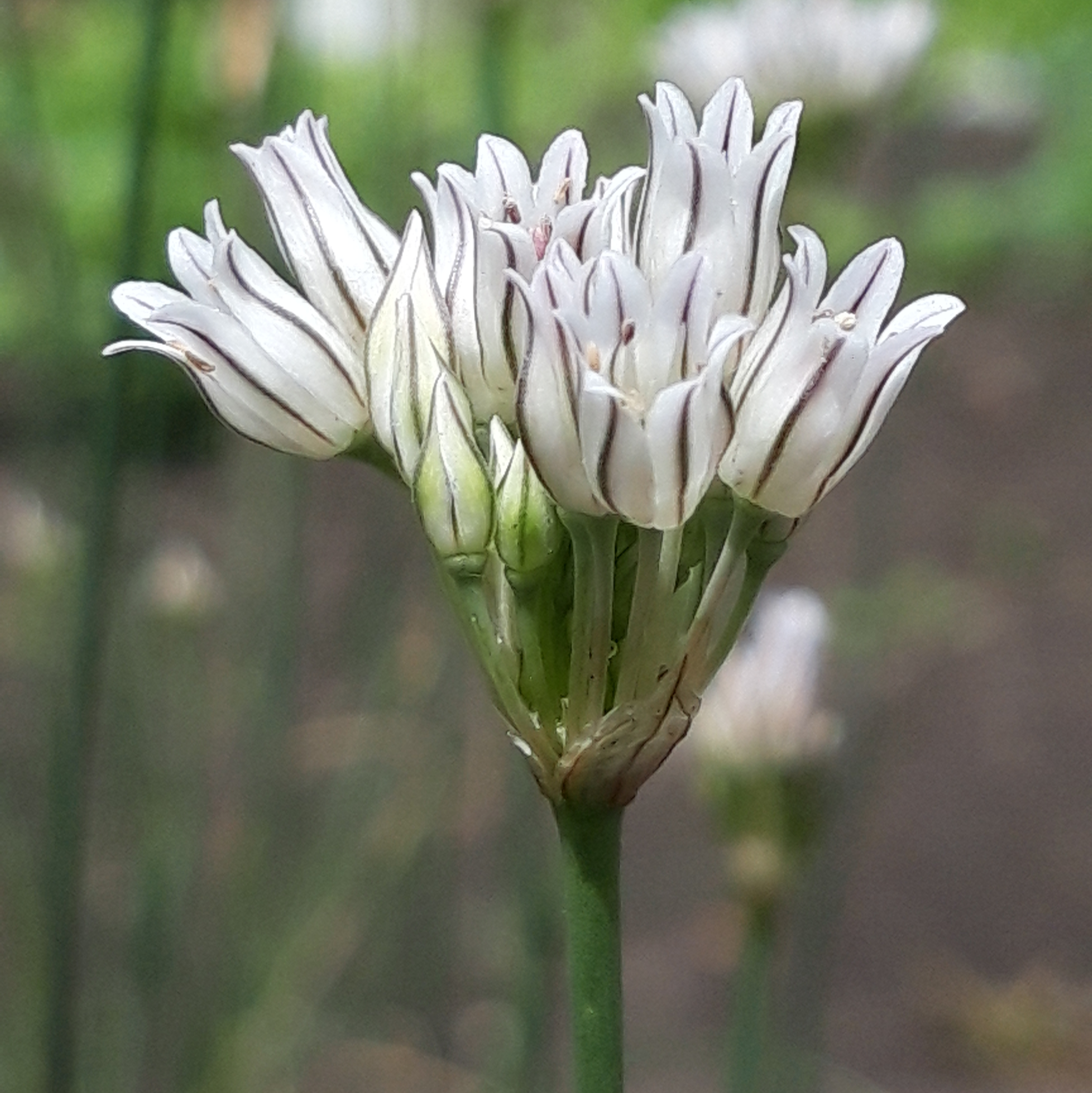

Scientific classification
- Kingdom: Plantae
- Clade: Tracheophytes
- Clade: Angiosperms
- Clade: Monocots
- Order: Asparagales
- Family: Amaryllidaceae
- Subfamily: Allioideae
- Genus: Allium
- Species: A. korolkowii

Binomial name
- Allium korolkowii Regel

Synonyms
- Allium moschatum var. brevipedunculatum Regel; Allium moschatum var. dubium Regel; Allium oliganthum var. elongatum Kar. & Kir.

= Allium korolkowii =

Species of plant

Allium korolkowii is a plant species native to Central Asia (Xinjiang, Kazakhstan, and Kyrgyzstan). It grows at elevations of 1,500–2,500 m (4,900–8,200 ft) and on dry slopes, river shores and basins.

Allium korolkowii produces egg-shaped bulbs up to 15 mm across. Scape is up to 30 cm high. Leaves are narrow, much shorter than the scape. Flower tepals are white or pink with purple medveins.
