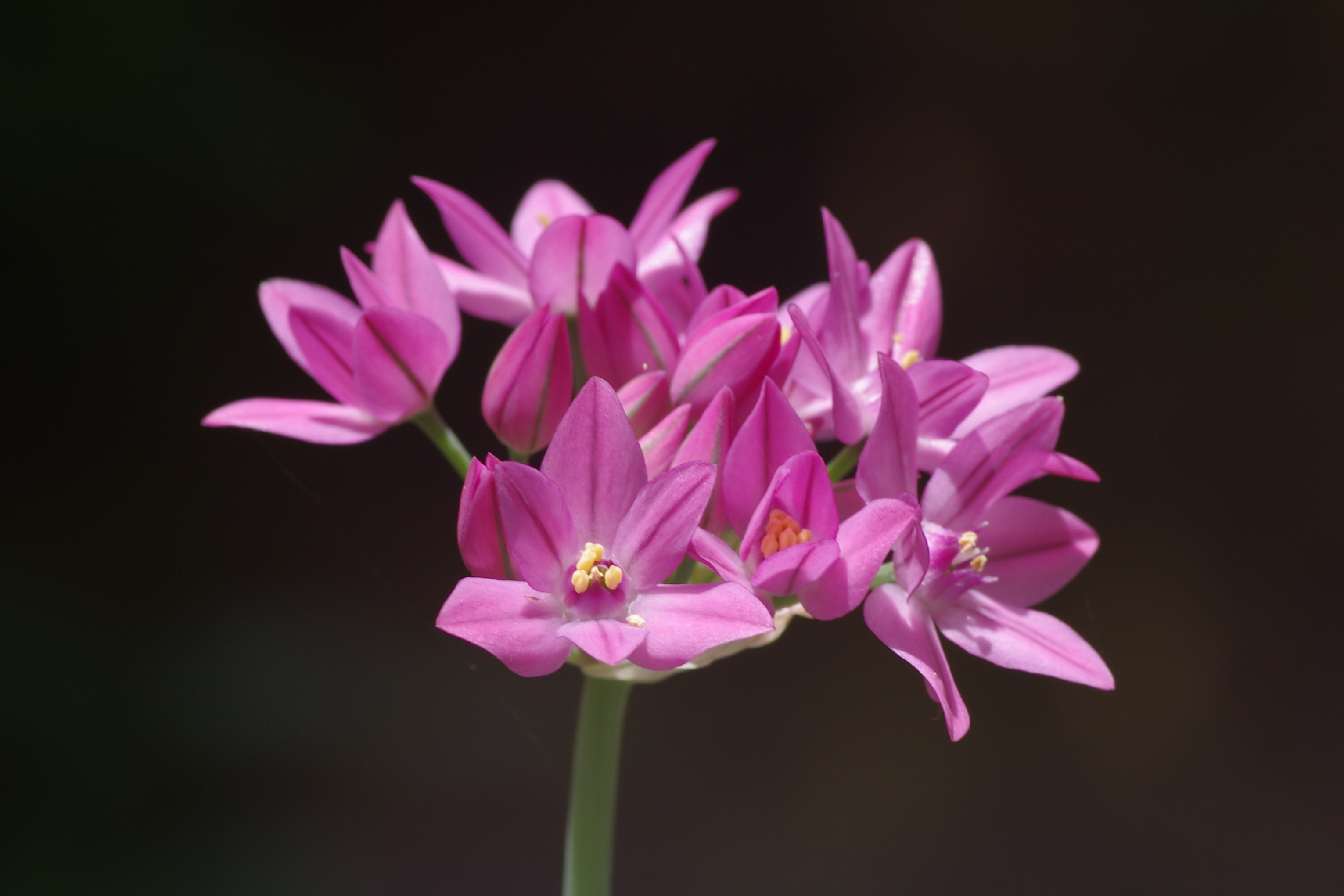

Scientific classification
- Kingdom: Plantae
- Clade: Tracheophytes
- Clade: Angiosperms
- Clade: Monocots
- Order: Asparagales
- Family: Amaryllidaceae
- Subfamily: Allioideae
- Genus: Allium
- Subgenus: A. subg. Porphyroprason
- Species: A. oreophilum

Binomial name
- Allium oreophilum C.A.Mey

Synonyms
- Allium ostrowskianum Regel; Allium platystemon Kar. & Kir.

= Allium oreophilum =

Pink lily leek

Species of plant

Allium oreophilum, the pink lily leek, is a species of monocot plant in the Amaryllidaceae family native to an area extending from Western China to Turkey and the Caucasus.

Allium oreophilum produces one spherical bulb up to 2 cm (2/3 in) in diameter. The scape is short for the genus, rarely more than 20 cm (8 in) tall. The leaves are flat, narrow and longer than the scape. The umbel is a loose dome with 10–15 pink or red flowers in late spring and early summer.

The plant is hardy but requires a sheltered position in full sun, with fertile soil.
