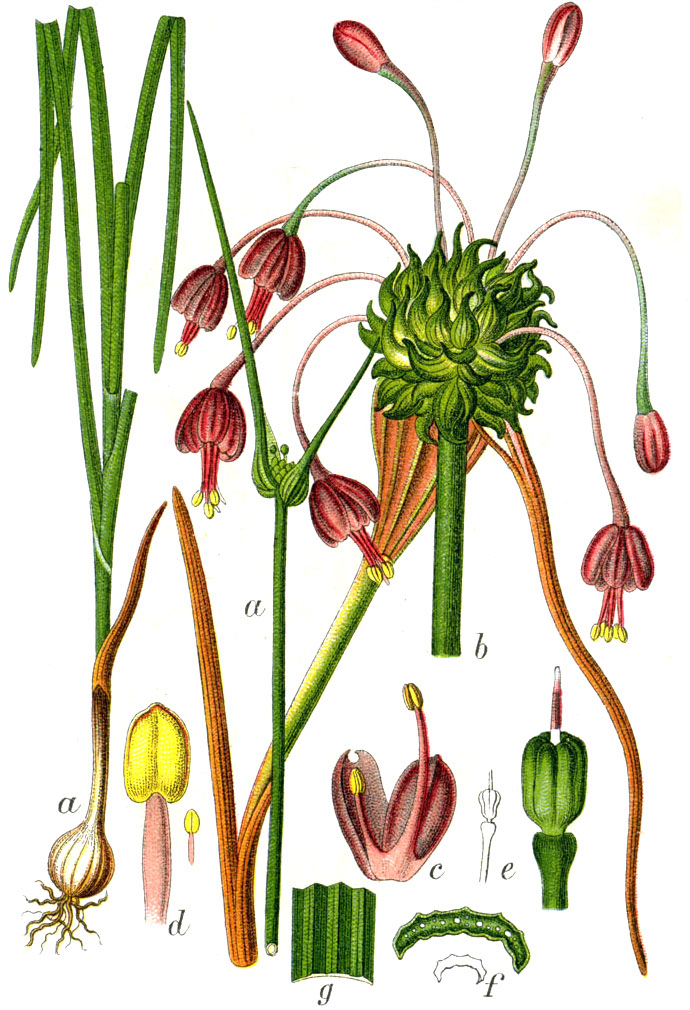
- Allium carinatum

Conservation status
- Least Concern (IUCN 3.1)

Scientific classification
- Kingdom: Plantae
- Clade: Embryophytes
- Clade: Tracheophytes
- Clade: Angiosperms
- Clade: Monocots
- Order: Asparagales
- Family: Amaryllidaceae
- Subfamily: Allioideae
- Genus: Allium
- Subgenus: A. subg. Allium
- Species: A. carinatum

Binomial name
- Allium carinatum L.

Synonyms
- Species synonymy: Aglitheis carinata (L.) Raf.; Allium asperum G.Don; Allium calcareum Reut.; Allium consimile Jord. ex Gren. & Godr.; Allium denticulatum Kit.; Allium flexifolium Jord. ex Gren. & Godr.; Allium flexum Waldst. & Kit.; Allium flexuosum Host 1827, illegitimate homonym not d'Urv. 1822 (syn of A. staticiforme); Allium foetidum Willd.; Allium monserratense Pourr. ex Willk. & Lange; Allium montenegrinum Beck & Szyszyl.; Allium pratense Schleich. ex Kunth.; Allium purpureum Schur; Allium violaceum Willd.; Cepa carinata (L.) Bernh.; Codonoprasum carinatum (L.) Rchb.; Codonoprasum consimile (Jord. ex Gren. & Godr.) Fourr.; Codonoprasum flexifolium (Jord. ex Gren. & Godr.) Fourr.; Raphione carinata (L.) Salisb.

= Allium carinatum =

Species of flowering plant

Allium carinatum, the keeled garlic or witch's garlic, is a bulbous perennial flowering plant in the family Amaryllidaceae. It is widespread across central and southern Europe, with some populations in Asiatic Turkey. It is cultivated in many places as an ornamental and also for its potently aromatic bulbs used as a food flavoring.

Subspecies

Numerous botanical names have been coined within the species at the subspecies level, but only two are recognized:

- Allium carinatum subsp. carinatum – most of species range
- Allium carinatum subsp. pulchellum (G.Don) Bonnier & Layens – central Europe + Balkans

== Description ==
Allium carinatum produces a single small bulb rarely more than 15 mm long, flat leaves, and an umbel up to 60 cm (24 in) tall of purple to reddish-purple flowers. The flowers are on long pedicels and often nodding (hanging downwards).

== Distribution ==
Allium carinatum is considered native to the Mediterranean Region from Spain to Turkey, north to Sweden and the Baltic Republics. It is naturalized in the British Isles

== Cultivation ==
A. carinatum subsp. pulchellum and the white flowering form A. carinatum subsp. pulchellum f. album have both gained the Royal Horticultural Society's Award of Garden Merit.
