= Allium asclepiadeum =

Scientific classification
- Kingdom: Plantae
- Clade: Tracheophytes
- Clade: Angiosperms
- Clade: Monocots
- Order: Asparagales
- Family: Amaryllidaceae
- Subfamily: Allioideae
- Genus: Allium
- Subgenus: Allium subg. Melanocrommyum
- Species: A. asclepiadeum

Binomial name
- Allium asclepiadeum Bornm.

Species of flowering plant

Allium asclepiadeum is a species of onion endemic to southern Turkey. The first collections of the species were made near the city then called Marasch, now Kahramanmaraş.
