= Allium kujukense =

Scientific classification
- Kingdom: Plantae
- Clade: Tracheophytes
- Clade: Angiosperms
- Clade: Monocots
- Order: Asparagales
- Family: Amaryllidaceae
- Subfamily: Allioideae
- Genus: Allium
- Subgenus: A. subg. Vvedenskya
- Species: A. kujukense

Binomial name
- Allium kujukense Vved.

Species of plant

Allium kujukense is a species of onion in the genus Allium. This species is in the family Amaryllidaceae and is endemic all over South-East Kazakhstan. This species has a bulbous geophyte.
