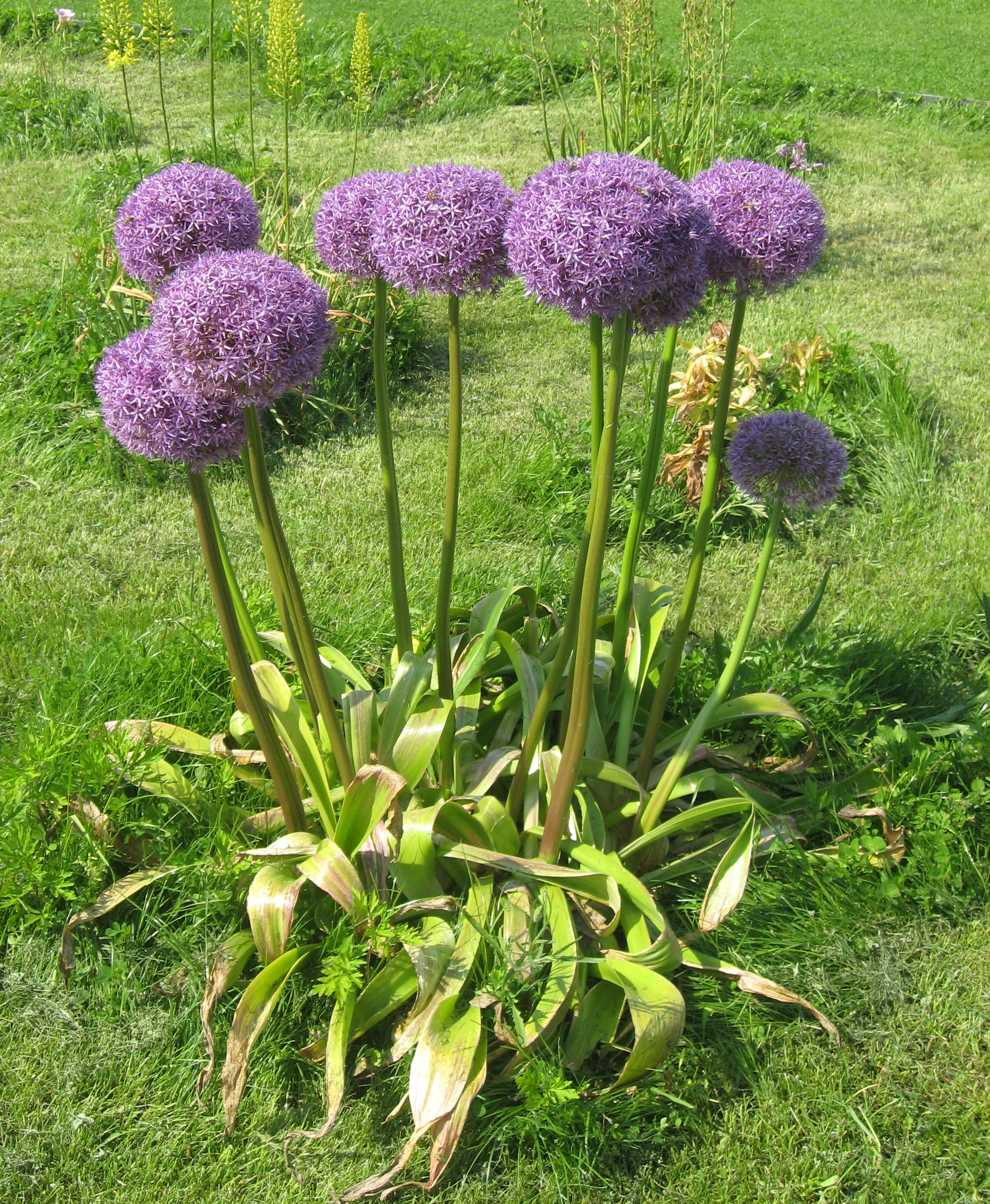

Scientific classification
- Kingdom: Plantae
- Clade: Tracheophytes
- Clade: Angiosperms
- Clade: Monocots
- Order: Asparagales
- Family: Amaryllidaceae
- Subfamily: Allioideae
- Genus: Allium
- Subgenus: Allium subg. Melanocrommyum
- Species: A. hollandicum

Binomial name
- Allium hollandicum R.M. Fritsch

= Allium hollandicum =

Species of flowering plant

Allium hollandicum, the Persian onion or Dutch garlic, is a species of flowering plant native to Iran and Kyrgyzstan but widely cultivated as an ornamental because of its umbels of attractive purple flowers. It is reportedly naturalized in Saint Louis County, Minnesota.

Allium hollandicum is a bulb-forming perennial with scapes up to 90 cm (35 in) tall. It has long, flat, strap-shaped leaves up to 60 cm (24 in) long. Umbels are relatively small and spherical, up to 10 cm (3.9 in) in diameter, composed of many purple to reddish-purple star-shaped flowers appearing in late spring and early summer.

The popular cultivar 'Purple Sensation' has gained the Royal Horticultural Society's Award of Garden Merit. It prefers moist, fertile soil in full sun.
