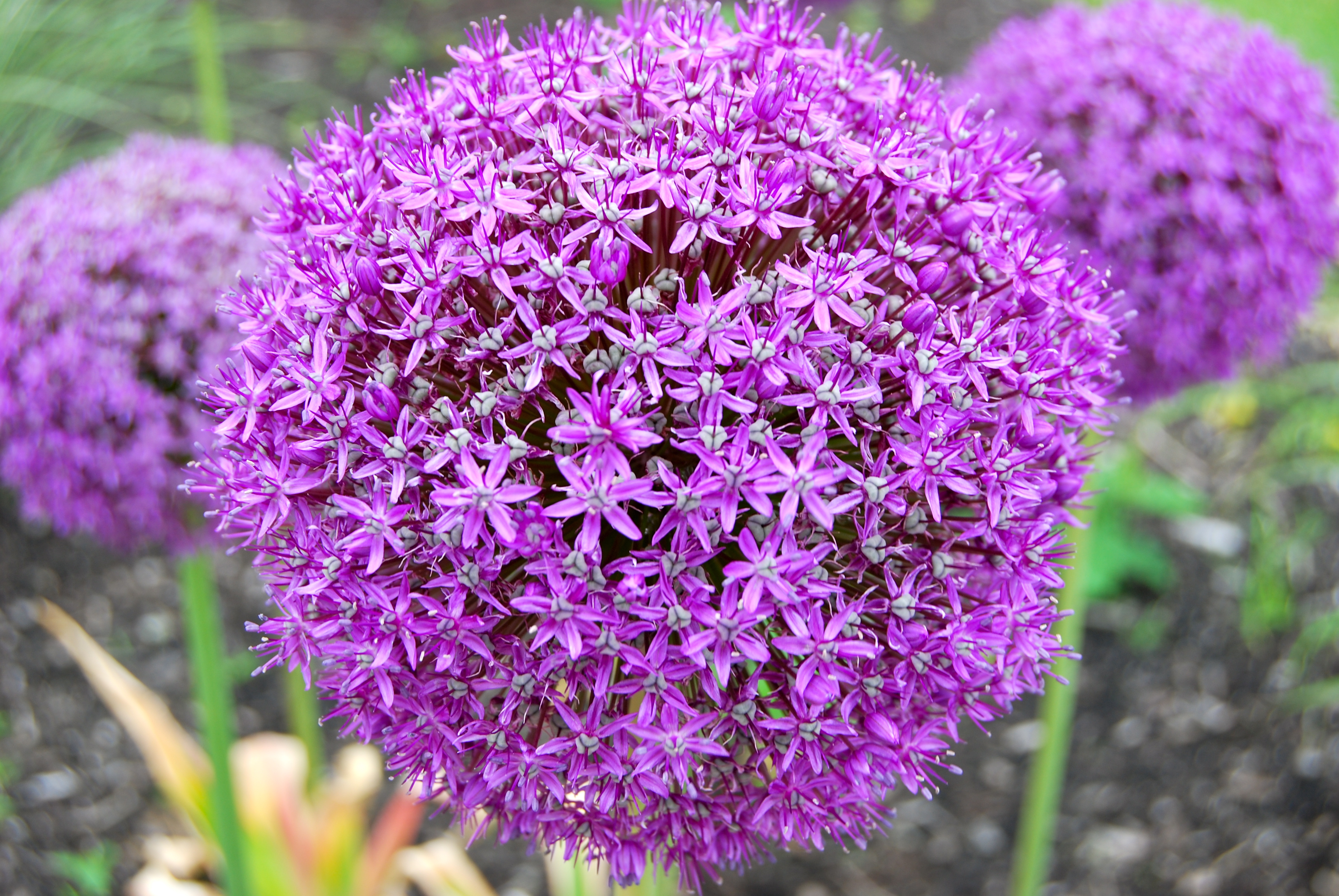

Scientific classification
- Kingdom: Plantae
- Clade: Tracheophytes
- Clade: Angiosperms
- Clade: Monocots
- Order: Asparagales
- Family: Amaryllidaceae
- Subfamily: Allioideae
- Genus: Allium
- Subgenus: Allium subg. Melanocrommyum
- Species: A. giganteum

Binomial name
- Allium giganteum Regel

Synonyms
- Allium procerum Trautv. ex Regel

= Allium giganteum =

Giant onion

Species of flowering plant

Allium giganteum, common name giant onion or giant leek, is an Asian species of onion in the amaryllis family (Amaryllidaceae), subfamily Allioideae, native to central and southwestern Asia but cultivated in many countries as a flowering garden plant. It is the tallest species of Allium in common cultivation, growing to 1.5 metres (4.9 ft).

In early to midsummer, small globes of intense purple umbels appear, followed by attractive fruiting umbels. A popular cultivar, 'Globemaster', is shorter (80 centimetres (31 in)) but produces much larger, deep violet, umbels (15–20 centimetres (5.9–7.9 in)). These globular umbels can contain thousands of florets (i.e. tiny flowers). A bulb dealer in Arcadia, California, counted 5286 florets from a single umbel. Both varieties have been granted the Royal Horticultural Society's Award of Garden Merit.

In nature, the species is found in Iran, Afghanistan, Turkmenistan, Tajikistan, and Uzbekistan. In cultivation in the US, it performs well in USDA hardiness zones 6–10.

Eating flowers, seeds, leaves, and stems can cause nausea, vomiting, and diarrhea due to the sulfides they contain.

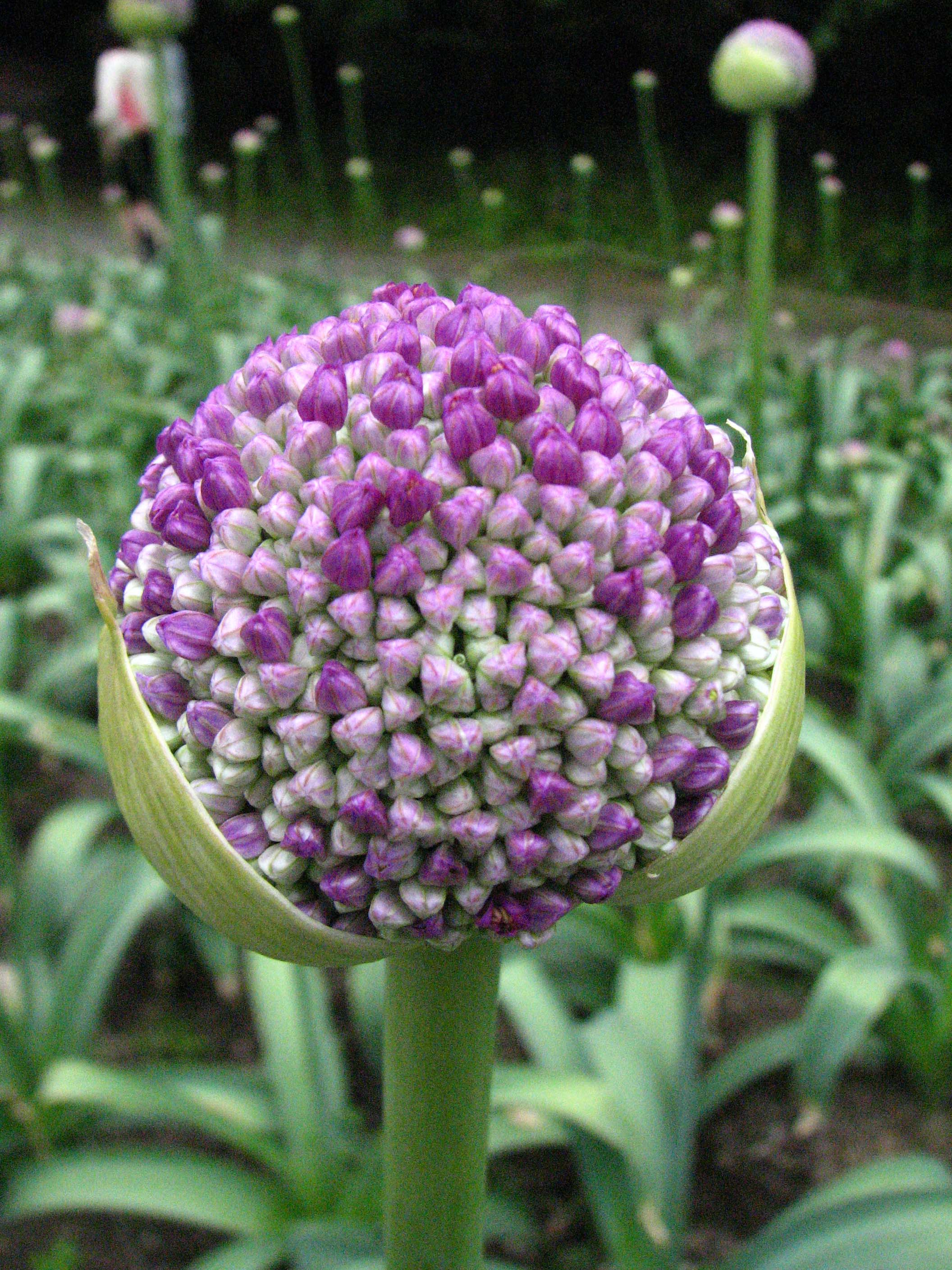
Flower opening
