= S-Methylcysteine =

Names
- IUPAC name S-Methyl-L-cysteine
- Systematic IUPAC name 2-amino-3-(methylthio)propanoic acid
- Other names 3-methylthioalanine

Identifiers
CAS Number	L-enantiomer: 1187-84-4
3D model (JSmol)	L-enantiomer: Interactive image
ChEBI	L-enantiomer: CHEBI:45658
ChEMBL	L-enantiomer: ChEMBL394875
ChemSpider	L-enantiomer: 22826
DrugBank	L-enantiomer: 02216
ECHA InfoCard	100.013.365
EC Number	L-enantiomer: 214-701-6
KEGG	L-enantiomer: C22040
PubChem CID	L-enantiomer: 24417
UNII	L-enantiomer: A34I1H07YM
CompTox Dashboard (EPA)	L-enantiomer: DTXSID50862579
- InChI: InChI=1S/C4H9NO2S/c1-8-2-3(5)4(6)7/h3H,2,5H2,1H3,(H,6,7)/t3-/m0/s1 Key: IDIDJDIHTAOVLG-VKHMYHEASA-N
- SMILES: L-enantiomer: CSC[C@@H](C(=O)O)N

Properties
Chemical formula	C_{4}H_{9}NO_{2}S
Molar mass	135.18 g·mol^{−1}
Appearance	white solid
Melting point	248 °C (478 °F; 521 K)

Hazards
- GHS labelling
Pictograms	(GHS07: Exclamation mark)
Signal word	Warning
Hazard statements	H302, H315, H319, H335
Precautionary statements	P261, P264, P270, P271, P280, P301+P312, P302+P352, P304+P340, P305+P351+P338, P312, P321, P330, P332+P313, P337+P313, P362, P403+P233, P405, P501
- Except where otherwise noted, data are given for materials in their standard state (at 25 °C [77 °F], 100 kPa). Infobox references

S-Methylcysteine is the amino acid with the nominal formula CH_{3}SCH_{2}CH(NH_{2})CO_{2}H. It is the S-methylated derivative of cysteine. This amino acid occurs widely in plants, including many edible vegetables.

== Natural occurrence ==
S-Methylcysteine is not genetically coded, but it arises by post-translational methylation of cysteine. One pathway involves methyl transfer from alkylated DNA by zinc-cysteinate-containing repair enzymes such as methylated-DNA-protein-cysteine methyltransferase.

S-Methylcysteine sulfoxide is an oxidized derivative of S-methylcysteine that is found in onions.

MetaCyc contains a list of biochemical reactions producing and consuming this substance.

== Other chemical properties ==
Beyond its biological context, S-methylcysteine has been examined as a chelating agent.
