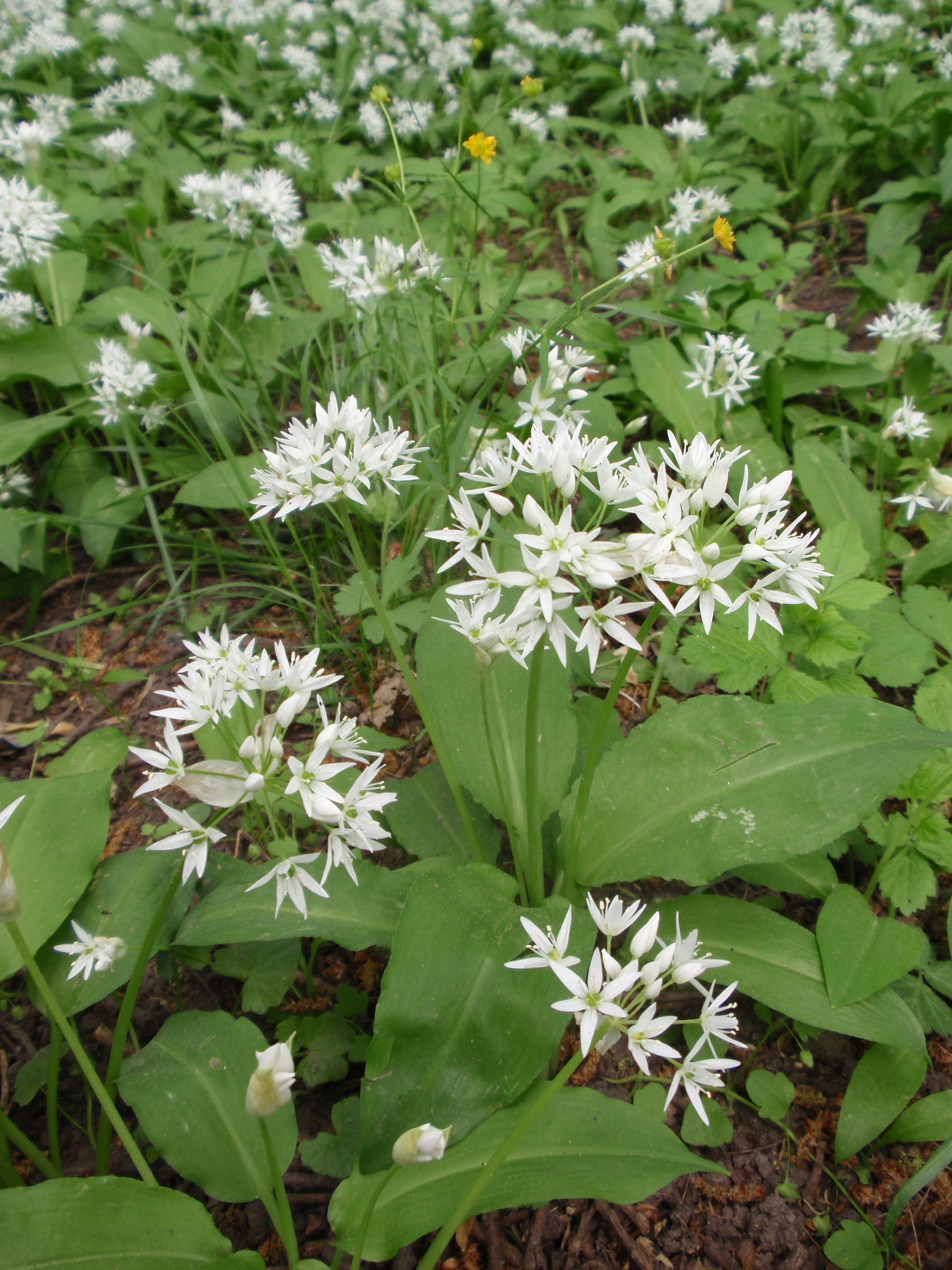
- Allium ursinum in habitat

Scientific classification
- Kingdom: Plantae
- Clade: Tracheophytes
- Clade: Angiosperms
- Clade: Monocots
- Order: Asparagales
- Family: Amaryllidaceae
- Subfamily: Allioideae
- Tribe: Allieae
- Genus: Allium; L.

Type species
- Allium sativum L.

Synonyms
- Synonymy: Cepa Mill.; Moly Mill.; Porrum Mill.; Saturnia Maratti; Moenchia Medik. 1790, illegitimate homonym not Ehrh. 1783 nor Roth 1788 nor Wender. ex Steud. 1841; Ascalonicum P.Renault; Schoenoprasum Kunth; Ophioscorodon Wallr.; Geboscon Raf.; Codonoprasum Rchb.; Molium (G.Don) Haw.; Nectaroscordum Lindl.; Aglitheis Raf.; Endotis Raf.; Getuonis Raf.; Gynodon Raf.; Kalabotis Raf.; Kepa Tourn. ex Raf.; Kromon Raf.; Loncostemon Raf.; Maligia Raf.; PanstenumRaf.; Plexistena Raf.; Stelmesus Raf.; Stemodoxis Raf.; Praskoinon Raf.; Trigonea Parl.; Caloscordum Herb.; Berenice Salisb. 1866, illegitimate homonym not Tul. 1857; Briseis Salisb.; Butomissa Salisb.; Calliprena Salisb.; Camarilla Salisb.; Canidia Salisb.; Hexonychia Salisb.; Hylogeton Salisb.; Iulus Salisb.; Molyza Salisb.; Phyllodolon Salisb.; Raphione Salisb.; Schoenissa Salisb.; Xylorhiza Salisb. 1866, illegitimate homonym not Nutt. 1840; Anguinum Fourr.; Rhizirideum Fourr.; Scorodon Fourr.; Milula Prain; Validallium Small

= Allium =

Genus of flowering plants

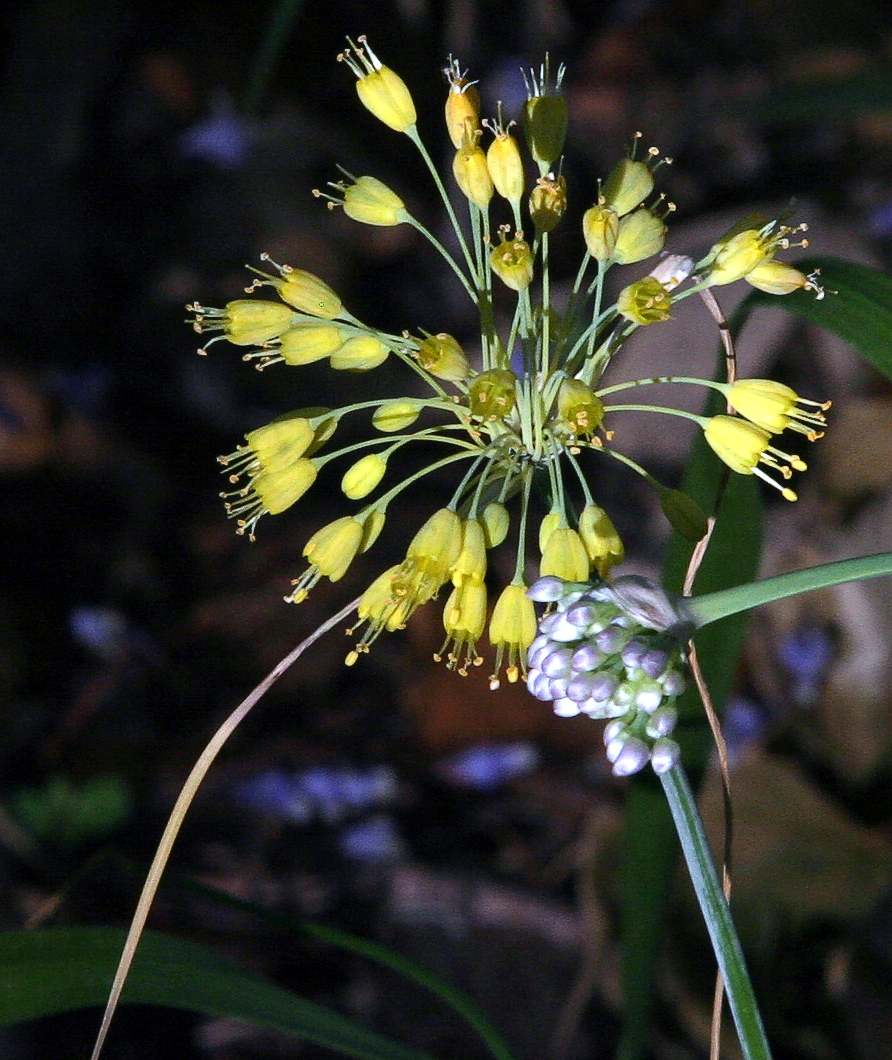
Allium flavum (yellow) and Allium carinatum (purple)

Allium sp.

Allium is a large genus of monocotyledonous flowering plants with 1112 accepted species, making Allium the largest genus in the family Amaryllidaceae and among the largest plant genera in the world. Many of the species are edible, and some have a long history of cultivation and human consumption such as the onion, garlic, scallions, shallots, leeks, and chives.

Allium species occur in temperate climates of the Northern Hemisphere, except for a few species occurring in Chile (such as A. juncifolium), Brazil (A. sellovianum), and tropical Africa (A. spathaceum). They vary in height between 5–150 centimetres (2–59 in). The flowers form an umbel at the top of a leafless stalk. The bulbs vary in size between species, from small (around 2–3 mm in diameter) to rather large (8–10 cm). Some species (such as Welsh onion A. fistulosum and leeks (A. ampeloprasum)) develop thickened leaf-bases rather than forming bulbs as such.

Carl Linnaeus first described the genus Allium in 1753. The generic name Allium is the Latin word for garlic, and the type species for the genus is Allium sativum which means "cultivated garlic". The decision to include a species in the genus Allium is taxonomically difficult, and species boundaries are unclear. Estimates of the number of species are as low as 260, and as high as 979. In the APG III classification system, Allium is placed in the family Amaryllidaceae, subfamily Allioideae (formerly the family Alliaceae). In some of the older classification systems, Allium was placed in Liliaceae. Molecular phylogenetic studies have shown this circumscription of Liliaceae is not monophyletic.

Various Allium species have been cultivated from the earliest times. About a dozen species are economically important as crops, or garden vegetables, and an increasing number of species are important as ornamental plants. Plants belonging to this genus produce cysteine-derived organosulfur compounds, which impart a distinctive onion or garlic flavor and scent. Many are used as food plants, though not all members of the genus are equally flavorful. In most cases, both bulb and leaves are edible. The characteristic Allium flavor depends on the sulfate content of the soil the plant grows in. In the rare occurrence of sulfur-depleted growth conditions, all Allium species completely lose their usual odors and flavors.

== Description ==
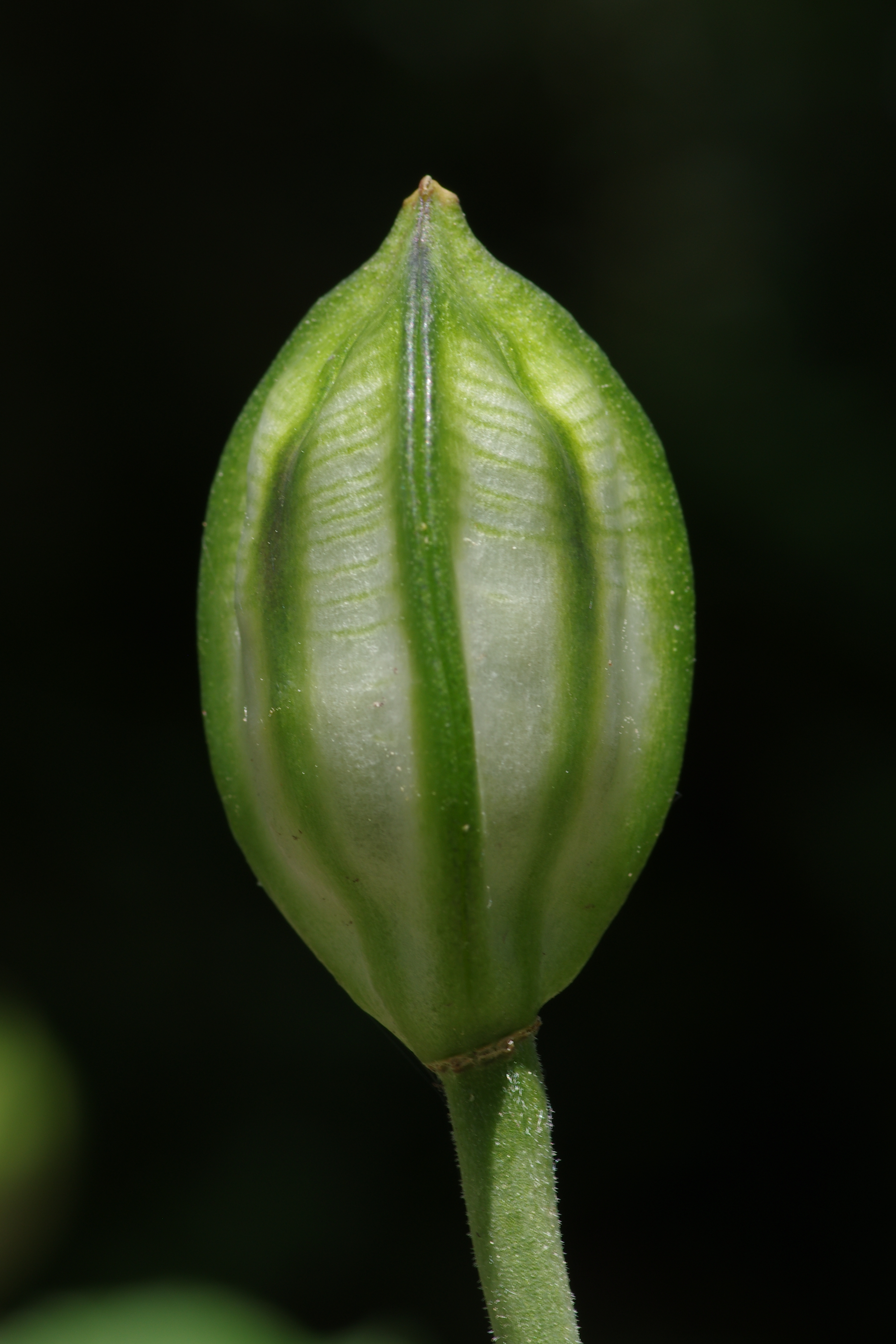
Capsule of Allium oreophilum.

The genus Allium (alliums) is characterised by herbaceous geophyte perennials with true bulbs, some of which are borne on rhizomes, and an onion or garlic odor and flavor.

The bulbs are solitary or clustered and tunicate and the plants are perennialized by the bulbs reforming annually from the base of the old bulbs, or are produced on the ends of rhizomes or, in a few species, at the ends of stolons. A small number of species have tuberous roots. The bulbs' outer coats are commonly brown or grey, with a smooth texture, and are fibrous, or with cellular reticulation. The inner coats of the bulbs are membranous.

Many alliums have basal leaves that commonly wither away from the tips downward before or while the plants flower, but some species have persistent foliage. Plants produce from one to 12 leaves, most species having linear, channeled or flat leaf blades. The leaf blades are straight or variously coiled, but some species have broad leaves, including A. victorialis and A. tricoccum. The leaves are sessile, and very rarely narrowed into a petiole.

The flowers, which are produced on scapes are erect or in some species pendent, having six petal-like tepals produced in two whorls. The flowers have one style and six epipetalous stamens; the anthers and pollen can vary in color depending on the species. The ovaries are superior, and three-lobed with three locules.

The fruits are capsules that open longitudinally along the capsule wall between the partitions of the locule. The seeds are black, and have a rounded shape.

The terete or flattened flowering scapes are normally persistent. The inflorescences are umbels, in which the outside flowers bloom first and flowering progresses to the inside. Some species produce bulbils within the umbels, and in some species, such as Allium paradoxum, the bulbils replace some or all the flowers. The umbels are subtended by noticeable spathe bracts, which are commonly fused and normally have around three veins.

Some bulbous alliums increase by forming little bulbs or "offsets" around the old one, as well as by seed. Several species can form many bulbils in the flowerhead; in the so-called "tree onion" or Egyptian onion (A. × proliferum) the bulbils are few, but large enough to be pickled.

Many of the species of Allium have been used as food items throughout their ranges. There are several unrelated species that are somewhat similar in appearance to alliums but are poisonous (e.g. in North America, death camas, Toxicoscordion venenosum), but none of these has the distinctive scent of onions or garlic.

== Taxonomy ==
With over 850 to 1,000 species Allium is the sole genus in the Allieae, one of four tribes of subfamily Allioideae (Amaryllidaceae). New species continue to be described and Allium is one of the largest monocotyledonous genera, but the precise taxonomy of Allium is poorly understood, with incorrect descriptions being widespread. The difficulties arise from the fact that the genus displays considerable polymorphism and has adapted to a wide variety of habitats. Furthermore, traditional classifications had been based on homoplasious characteristics (the independent evolution of similar features in species of different lineages). However, the genus has been shown to be monophyletic, containing three major clades, although some proposed subgenera are not. Some progress is being made using molecular phylogenetic methods, and the internal transcribed spacer (ITS) region, including the 5.8S rDNA and the two spacers ITS1 and ITS2, is one of the more commonly used markers in the study of the differentiation of the Allium species.

Allium includes a number of taxonomic groupings previously considered separate genera (Caloscordum Herb., Milula Prain and Nectaroscordum Lindl.) Allium spicatum had been treated by many authors as Milula spicata, the only species in the monospecific genus Milula. In 2000, it was shown to be embedded in Allium.

=== Phylogeny ===
- Amaryllidaceae: Subfamily Allioideae
  - - - Tribe Allieae (monogeneric, Allium)
      - - Tribe Tulbaghieae
        - Tribes Gilliesieae, Leucocoryneae

=== History ===
When Linnaeus formerly described the genus Allium in his Species Plantarum (1753), there were thirty species with this name. He placed Allium in a grouping he referred to as Hexandria monogynia (i.e. six stamens and one pistil) containing 51 genera in all.

=== Subdivision ===
Linnaeus originally grouped his 30 species into three alliances, e.g. Foliis caulinis planis. Since then, many attempts have been made to divide the growing number of recognised species into infrageneric subgroupings, initially as sections, and then as subgenera further divided into sections. For a brief history, see Li et al. (2010). The modern era of phylogenetic analysis dates to 1996. In 2006 Friesen, Fritsch, and Blattner described a new classification with 15 subgenera, 56 sections, and about 780 species based on the nuclear ribosomal gene internal transcribed spacers. Some of the subgenera correspond to the once separate genera (Caloscordum, Milula, Nectaroscordum) included in the Gilliesieae. The terminology has varied with some authors subdividing subgenera into Sections and others Alliances. The term Alliance has also been used for subgroupings within species, e.g. Allium nigrum, and for subsections.

Subsequent molecular phylogenetic studies have shown the 2006 classification is a considerable improvement over previous classifications, but some of its subgenera and sections are probably not monophyletic. Meanwhile, the number of new species continued to increase, reaching 800 by 2009, and the pace of discovery has not decreased. Detailed studies have focused on a number of subgenera, including Amerallium. Amerallium is strongly supported as monophyletic. Subgenus Melanocrommyum has also been the subject of considerable study, while work on subgenus Allium has focussed on section Allium, including Allium ampeloprasum, although sampling was not sufficient to test the monophyly of the section.

The major evolutionary lineages or lines correspond to the three major clades. Line one (the oldest) with three subgenera is predominantly bulbous, the second, with five subgenera and the third with seven subgenera contain both bulbous and rhizomatous taxa.

=== Evolutionary lines and subgenera ===
The three evolutionary lineages and 15 subgenera here represent the classification schemes of Friesen et al. (2006) and Li (2010), and subsequent additional species and revisions.

Cladogram of evolutionary lines in Allium

- Allium
  - First evolutionary line
  - - Second evolutionary line
    - Third evolutionary line

Evolutionary lines and subgenera (number of sections/number of species)

- First evolutionary line (3 subgenera)
  - Nectaroscordum (Lindl.) Asch. et Graebn Type: Allium siculum (1/3) Mediterranean bells, Sicilian honey garlic
  - Microscordum (Maxim.) N. Friesen Type: Allium monanthum (1/1)
  - Amerallium Traub Type: Allium canadense (12/135)
- Second evolutionary line (5 subgenera)
  - Caloscordum (Herb.) R. M. Fritsch Type: Allium neriniflorum (1/3)
  - Anguinum (G. Don ex Koch) N. Friesen Type: Allium victorialis (1/12)
  - Porphyroprason (Ekberg) R. M. Fritsch Type: Allium oreophilum (1/1)
  - Vvedenskya (Kamelin) R. M. Fritsch Type: Allium kujukense (1/1)
  - Melanocrommyum (Webb et Berthel.) Rouy Type: Allium nigrum (20/160)
- Third evolutionary line (7 subgenera)
  - Butomissa (Salisb.) N. Friesen Type: Allium ramosum (2/4) fragrant garlic
  - Cyathophora R. M. Fritsch Type: Allium cyathophorum (3/5)
  - Rhizirideum (G. Don ex Koch) Wendelbo s.s Type: Allium senescens (5/37)
  - Allium L. Type: Allium sativum (15/300) garlic
  - Reticulatobulbosa (Kamelin) N. Friesen Type: Allium lineare (5/80)
  - Polyprason Radic Type: Allium moschatum (4/50)
  - Cepa (Mill.) Radic ́ Type: Allium cepa (5/30) onion, garden onion, bulb onion, common onion

==== First evolutionary line ====
Although this lineage consists of three subgenera, nearly all the species are attributed to subgenus Amerallium, the third largest subgenus of Allium. The lineage is considered to represent the most ancient line within Allium, and to be the only lineage that is purely bulbous, the other two having both bulbous and rhizomatous taxa. Within the lineage Amerallium is a sister group to the other two subgenera (Microscordum+Nectaroscordum).

==== Second evolutionary line ====
Nearly all the species in this lineage of five subgenera are accounted for by subgenus Melanocrommyum, which is most closely associated with subgenera Vvedenskya and Porphyroprason, phylogenetically. These three genera are late-branching whereas the remaining two subgenera, Caloscordum and Anguinum, are early branching.

==== Third evolutionary line ====
The third evolutionary line contains the greatest number of sections (seven), and also the largest subgenus of the genus Allium: subgenus Allium, which includes the type species of the genus, Allium sativum. This subgenus also contains the majority of the species in its lineage. Within the lineage, the phylogeny is complex. Two small subgenera, Butomissa and Cyathophora form a sister clade to the remaining five subgenera, with Butomissa as the first branching group. Amongst the remaining five subgenera, Rhizirideum forms a medium-sized subgenus that is the sister to the other four, larger, subgenera. This line may not be monophyletic.

==== Proposed infrageneric groups ====
Names from

- Allium sect. Acanthoprason Wendelbo
- Allium subsect. Acuminatae Ownbey ex Traub
- Allium sect. Amerallium Traub
- Allium sect. Anguinum G. Don
- Allium sect. Brevispatha Vals.
- Allium sect. Briseis Stearn
- Allium sect. Bromatorrhiza Ekberg
- Allium sect. Caloscordum Baker
- Allium subsect. Campanulatae Ownbey ex Traub
- Allium sect. Caulorhizideum Traub
- Allium subsect. Cepa Stearn
- Allium subsect. Cernuae Rchb.
- Allium sect. Codonoprasum Ekberg
- Allium sect. Falcatifolia N. Friesen
- Allium subsect. Falcifoliae Ownbey ex Traub
- Allium sect. Halpostemon Boiss.
- Allium sect. Haneltia F.O. Khass.
- Allium sect. Lophioprason Traub.
- Allium subg. Melanocrommyon (Webb & Berthel.) Rouy
- Allium subsect. Mexicana Traub
- Allium sect. Molium G. Don ex W.D.J. Koch
- Allium sect. Multicaulea F.O. Khass. & Yengal.
- Allium sect. Oreiprason F. Herm.
- Allium sect. Petroprason F. Herm.
- Allium subg. Polyprason Radic
- Allium sect. Porrum G. Don
- Allium sect. Rhiziridium G. Don ex W.D.J. Koch
- Allium sect. Rhophetoprason Traub
- Allium subsect. Sanbornae Ownbey ex Traub
- Allium sect. Schoenoprasum Dumort.
- Allium sect. Scorodon
- Allium sect. Unicaulea F.O. Khass.

== Distribution and habitat ==
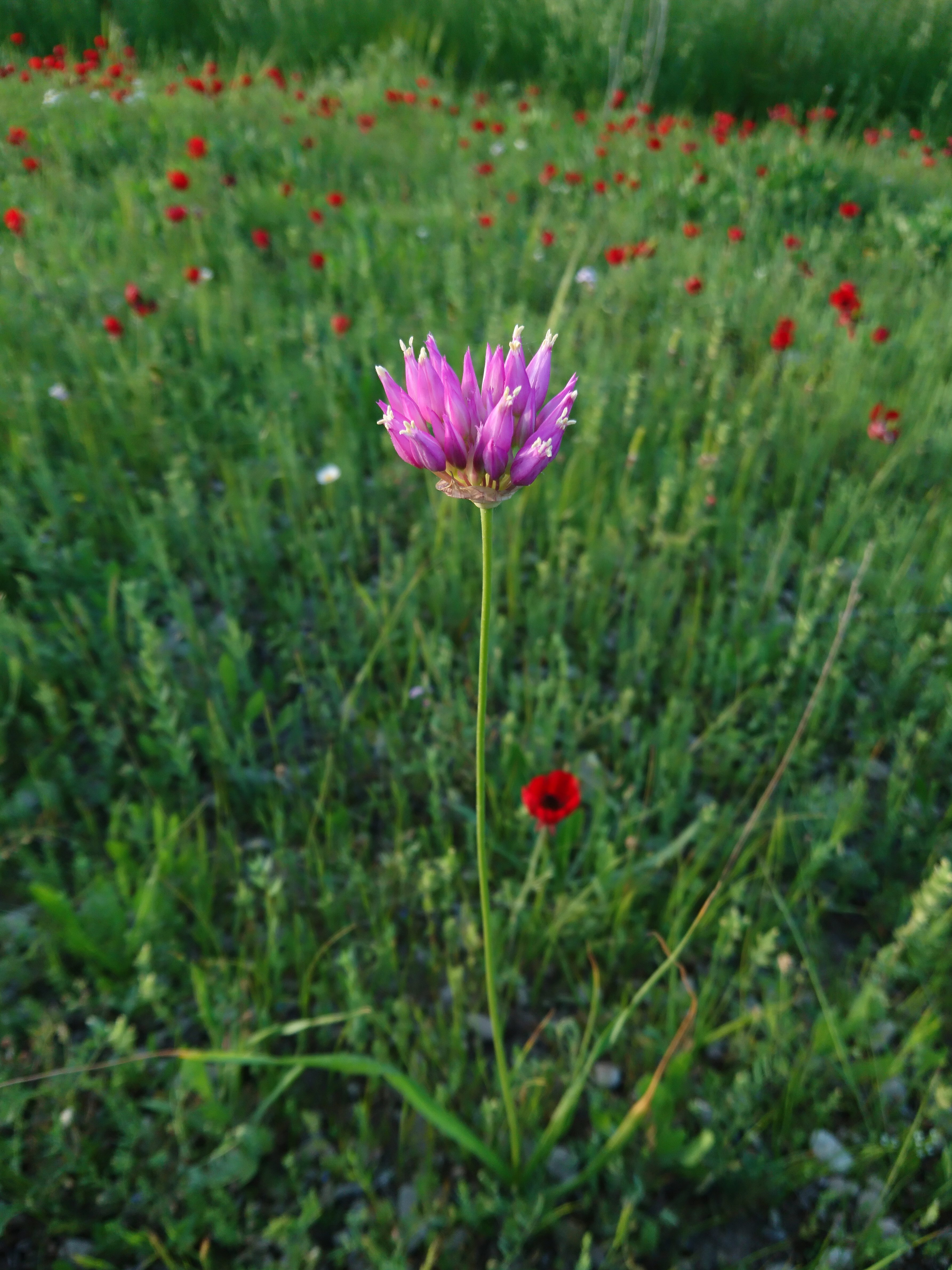
Wild Allium in Behbahan, Iran

The majority of Allium species are native to the Northern Hemisphere, being spread throughout the holarctic region, from dry subtropics to the boreal zone, predominantly in Asia. Of the latter, 138 species occur in China, about a sixth of all Allium species, representing five subgenera. A few species are native to Africa and Central and South America. A single known exception, Allium dregeanum occurs in the Southern Hemisphere (South Africa). There are two centres of diversity, a major one from the Mediterranean Basin to Central Asia and Pakistan, while a minor one is found in western North America. The genus is especially diverse in the eastern Mediterranean.

== Ecology ==
Species grow in various conditions from dry, well-drained mineral-based soils to moist, organic soils; most grow in sunny locations, but a number also grow in forests (e.g., A. ursinum), or even in swamps or water.

Various Allium species are used as food plants by the larvae of the leek moth and onion fly as well as other Lepidoptera including cabbage moth, common swift moth (recorded on garlic), garden dart moth, large yellow underwing moth, nutmeg moth, setaceous Hebrew character moth, turnip moth and Schinia rosea, a moth that feeds exclusively on Allium species.

== Genetics ==
The genus Allium has very large variation between species in their genome size that is not accompanied by changes in ploidy level. This remarkable variation was noted in the discussion of the evolution of junk DNA and resulted in the Onion Test, a "reality check for anyone who thinks they have come up with a universal function for junk DNA". Genome sizes vary between 7.5 Gb in A. schoenoprasum and 30.9 Gb in A. ursinum, both of which are diploid.

== Telomere ==
The unusual telomeric sequence of Allium cepa was discovered and cytologically validated to be CTCGGTTATGGG. A bioinformatics method for detecting this unique telomere sequence was demonstrated using SERF de novo Genome Analysis.

== Cultivation ==
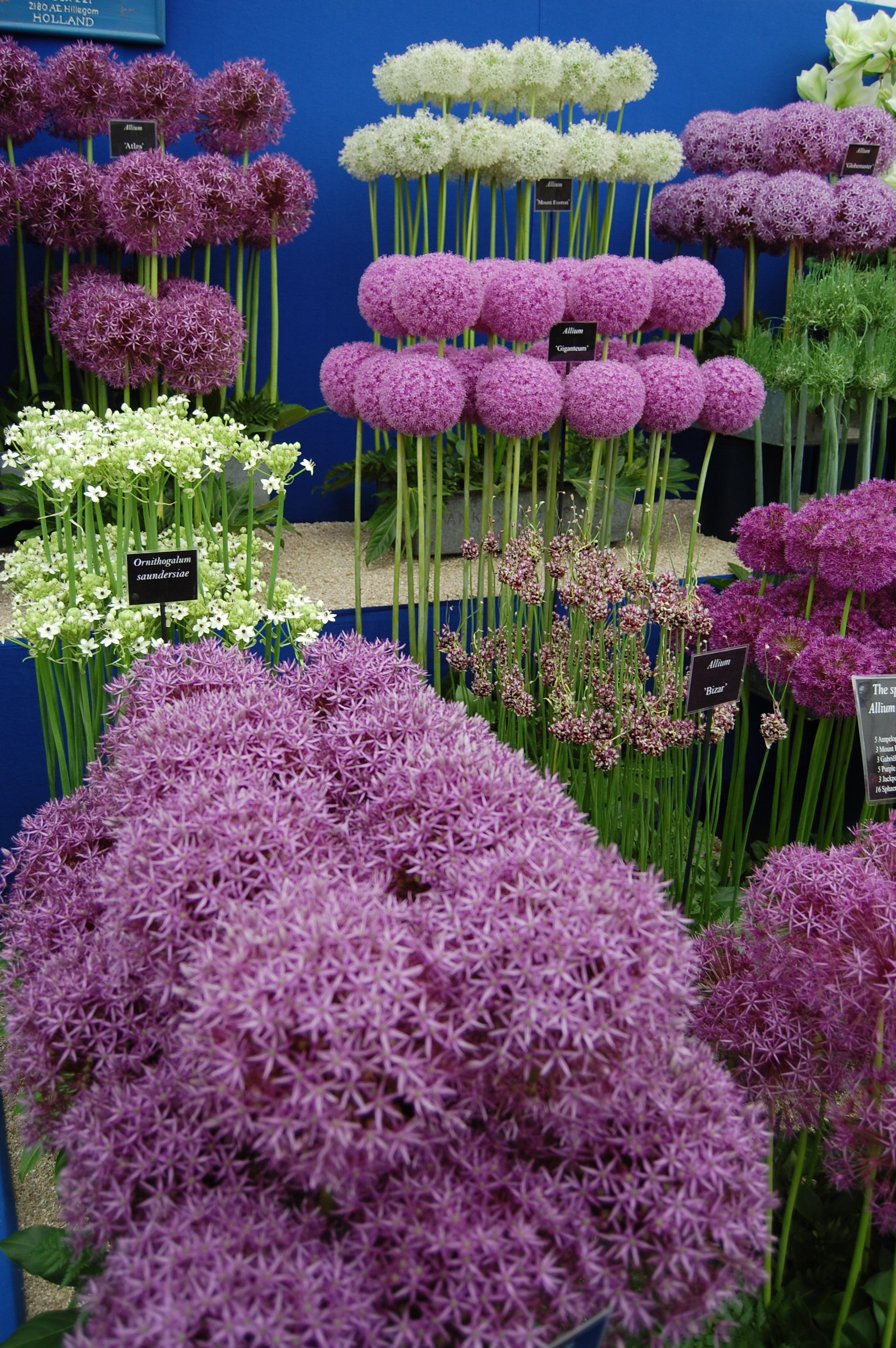
Selection of cultivated alliums displayed at the BBC Gardeners' World Live show

Many Allium species have been harvested through human history, but only about a dozen are still economically important today as crops or garden vegetables.

=== Ornamental ===
Many Allium species and hybrids are cultivated as ornamentals. These include A. cristophii and A. giganteum, which are used as border plants for their ornamental flowers, and their "architectural" qualities. Several hybrids have been bred, or selected, with rich purple flowers. A. hollandicum 'Purple Sensation' is one of the most popular and has been given an Award of Garden Merit (H4). These ornamental onions produce spherical umbels on single stalks in spring and summer, in a wide variety of sizes and colours, ranging from white (Allium 'Mont Blanc'), blue (A. caeruleum), to yellow (A. flavum) and purple (A. giganteum). By contrast, other species (such as invasive A. triquetrum and A. ursinum) can become troublesome garden weeds.

The following cultivars, of uncertain or mixed parentage, have gained the Royal Horticultural Society's Award of Garden Merit:

- 'Ambassador'
- 'Beau Regard'
- 'Gladiator'
- 'Globemaster'
- 'Michael H. Hoog' (A. rosenorum)
- 'Round 'n' Purple'
- 'Universe'

== Toxicity ==
Dogs and cats are very susceptible to poisoning after the consumption of certain species. Cattle have occasionally suffered onion toxicosis as well. There are concerns about Allium consumption by people with G6PD deficiency, a genetic disorder that renders red blood cells highly susceptible to oxidative insult.

The suspected toxic substance in Allium are the sulfur-containing chemicals, specifically disulfides and S-methylcysteine sulfoxide (SMCO): ironically the same ones associated with alleged health benefits in humans and rodents.

== Food ==
The genus includes many economically important cultivated species used in food, notably onions (A. cepa), French shallots (A. oschaninii), leeks (A. ampeloprasum), garlic (A. sativum), and herbs such as scallions (various Allium species) and chives (A. schoenoprasum), as well as species gathered from the wild, such as wild garlic (Allium ursinum) in Europe and ramps (Allium tricoccum) in North America.

== Traditional medicine and ritual uses ==
Some have been used as traditional medicines.

Members of the genus and plants with similar properties, often called 'leeks', had a prominent role in Germanic paganism. Indeed, leeks, laukaz 'leek', are the only botanical term found in runic inscriptions, likely for protection and healing.

== Sources ==
- Brullo, Salvatore; Guglielmo, Anna; Pavone, Pietro; Salmeri, Cristina; Terrasi, M. Carmen (January 2003). "Three new species of Allium sect. Codonoprasum from Greece". Plant Biosystems. 137 (2): 131–140. Bibcode:2003PBios.137..131B. doi:10.1080/11263500312331351391. S2CID 86821437.
- Koçyiğıt, Mine; Yeşıl, Yeter; Koyuncu, Mehmet (14 January 2016). "Allium dumanii (A. sect. Codonoprasum, Amaryllidaceae), a new species from E Turkey". Willdenowia. 46 (1): 113–119. Bibcode:2016Willd..46..113K. doi:10.3372/wi.46.46109. S2CID 88440208.
- Nguyen, Nhu H.; Driscoll, Heather E.; Specht, Chelsea D. (2008). "A molecular phylogeny of the wild onions (Allium; Alliaceae) with a focus on the western North American center of diversity" (PDF). Molecular Phylogenetics and Evolution. 47 (3): 1157–1172. Bibcode:2008MolPE..47.1157N. doi:10.1016/j.ympev.2007.12.006. PMID 18226928.

== Bibliography ==
=== Books ===
- Block, Eric (2009). Garlic and other alliums: the lore and the science. Cambridge: Royal Society of Chemistry. ISBN 978-0-85404-190-9.
- Brewster, J. L. (2008). Onions and Other Alliums. CABI Publishing. ISBN 978-1-84593-399-9.
- Davies, D. (1992). Alliums: The Ornamental Onions. Timber Press. ISBN 978-0-88192-241-7.
- Linnaeus, C. (1753). Species Plantarum: exhibentes plantas rite cognitas, ad genera relatas, cum differentiis specificis, nominibus trivialibus, synonymis selectis, locis natalibus, secundum systema sexuale digestas. Stockholm: Impensis Laurentii Salvii.
- Rabinowitch, H. D.; Currah, L. (2002). Allium Crop Sciences: Recent Advances. CABI Publishing. ISBN 978-0-85199-510-6.
- Quattrocchi, Umberto (1999). CRC world dictionary of plant names: common names, scientific names, eponyms, synonyms, and etymology. Boca Raton, FL: CRC Press. ISBN 978-0-8493-2673-8.
- Woodward, P. (1996). Garlic and Friends: The History, Growth and Use of Edible Alliums. Hyland House. ISBN 978-1-86447-009-3.

=== Chapters ===
- Fritsch, RM; Friesen, N (January 2002). Evolution, domestication and taxonomy. pp. 5–30., in Rabinowitch & Currah (2002)

=== Articles ===
- Banfi, Enrico; Galasso, Gabriele; Soldano, Adriano (1 September 2011). "Notes on systematics and taxonomy for the Italian vascular flora. 2". Natural History Sciences (Milan). 152 (2): 85–106. doi:10.4081/nhs.2011.85.
- von Berg, Gerlinde Linne; Samoylov, Alexander; Klaas, Manfred; Hanelt, Peter (September 1996). "Chloroplast DNA restriction analysis and the infrageneric grouping of Allium (Alliaceae)". Plant Systematics and Evolution. 200 (3–4): 253–261. Bibcode:1996PSyEv.200..253V. doi:10.1007/bf00984939. S2CID 12751231.
- Choi, Hyeok Jae; Giussani, Liliana M.; Jang, Chang Gee; Oh, Byoung Un; Cota-Sánchez, J. Hugo (June 2012). "Systematics of disjunct northeastern Asian and northern North American Allium (Amaryllidaceae)". Botany. 90 (6): 491–508. Bibcode:2012Botan..90..491C. doi:10.1139/b2012-031. hdl:11336/68813.
- Deniz, İsmail Gökhan; Genç, İlker; Sarı, Duygu (9 June 2015). "Morphological and molecular data reveal a new species of Allium (Amaryllidaceae) from SW Anatolia, Turkey". Phytotaxa. 212 (4): 283–292. Bibcode:2015Phytx.212..283D. doi:10.11646/phytotaxa.212.4.4.
- Dubouzet, J. G.; Shinoda, K.; Murata, N. (17 December 1997). "Phylogeny of Allium L. subgenus Rhizirideum (G. Don ex Koch) Wendelbo according to dot blot hybridization with randomly amplified DNA probes". Theoretical and Applied Genetics. 95 (8): 1223–1228. doi:10.1007/s001220050685. S2CID 33083704.
- Fragman-Sapir, Ori; Fritsch, Reinhard M. (2011). "New species of Allium sect. Melanocrommyum from the eastern Mediterranean" (PDF). Herbertia. 65: 31–50. Archived from the original (PDF) on 2016-09-23.
- Friesen, N.; Fritsch, R.; Bachmann, K. (1997). "Hybrid origin of some ornamentals of Allium subgenus Melanocrommyum verified with GISH and RAPD". Theoretical and Applied Genetics. 95 (8): 1229–1238. doi:10.1007/s001220050686. S2CID 21554910.
- Friesen, Nikolai; Fritsch, Reinhard M.; Pollner, Sven; Blattner, Frank R. (2000). "Molecular and Morphological Evidence for an Origin of the Aberrant Genus Milula within Himalayan Species of Allium (Alliacae)". Molecular Phylogenetics and Evolution. 17 (2): 209–218. Bibcode:2000MolPE..17..209F. doi:10.1006/mpev.2000.0844. PMID 11083935.
- Friesen, N; Fritsch, RM; Blattner, Frank R (2006). "Phylogeny and new intrageneric classification of Allium (Alliaceae) based on nuclear ribosomal DNA ITS sequences". Aliso. 22: 372–395. doi:10.5642/aliso.20062201.31.
- Fritsch, RM; Gurushidze, M; Jedelská, J; Keusgen, M (2006). "More than a pretty face - ornamental "drumstick onions" of Allium subg. Melanocrommyum are also potential medicinal plants". Herbertia. 60: 26–59.
- Fritsch, RM; Blattner, FR; Gurushidze, M (2010). "New classification of Allium L. subg. Melanocrommyum (Webb & Berthel) Rouy (Alliaceae) based on molecular and morphological characters". Phyton. 49: 145–220.
- Gurushidze, Maia; Fuchs, Jörg; Blattner, Frank R. (1 March 2012). "The Evolution of Genome Size Variation in Drumstick Onions (Allium subgenus Melanocrommyum)". Systematic Botany. 37 (1): 96–104. Bibcode:2012SysBo..37...96G. doi:10.1600/036364412X616675. S2CID 85838253.
- Hirschegger, Pablo; Jaške, Jernej; Trontelj, Peter; Bohanec, Borut (2010). "Origins of Allium ampeloprasum horticultural groups and a molecular phylogeny of the section Allium (Allium; Alliaceae)"". Molecular Phylogenetics and Evolution. 54 (2): 488–497. Bibcode:2010MolPE..54..488H. doi:10.1016/j.ympev.2009.08.030. PMID 19733249.
- Huang, De-Qing; Yang, Jing-Tian; Zhou, Chun-Jing; Zhou, Song-Dong; He, Xing-Jin (21 December 2013). "Phylogenetic reappraisal of Allium subgenus Cyathophora (Amaryllidaceae) and related taxa, with a proposal of two new sections". Journal of Plant Research. 127 (2): 275–286. doi:10.1007/s10265-013-0617-8. PMID 24362461. S2CID 15531719.
- İpek, Meryem; İpek, Ahmet; SIMON, Philipp W. (2014). "Testing the utility of matK and ITS DNA regions for discrimination of Allium species". Turkish Journal of Botany. 38: 203–212. Bibcode:2014TJBot..38..203I. doi:10.3906/bot-1308-46.
- Li, R. J.; Shang, Z. Y.; Cui, T. C.; Xu, J. M. (1996). "Studies on karyotypes and phylogenetic relationship of Allium sect. Caloscordum (Liliaceae) from China". Acta Phytotax. Sin. 34: 288–295. [In Chinese.]
- Li, Q.-Q.; Zhou, S.-D.; He, X.-J.; Yu, Y.; Zhang, Y.-C.; Wei, X.-Q. (21 October 2010). "Phylogeny and biogeography of Allium (Amaryllidaceae: Allieae) based on nuclear ribosomal internal transcribed spacer and chloroplast rps16 sequences, focusing on the inclusion of species endemic to China". Annals of Botany. 106 (5): 709–733. doi:10.1093/aob/mcq177. PMC 2958792. PMID 20966186.
- Nguyen, Nhu H.; Driscoll, Heather E.; Specht, Chelsea D. (2008). "A molecular phylogeny of the wild onions (Allium; Alliaceae) with a focus on the western North American center of diversity". Molecular Phylogenetics and Evolution. 47 (3): 1157–1172. Bibcode:2008MolPE..47.1157N. doi:10.1016/j.ympev.2007.12.006. PMID 18226928.
- A. Samoylov, N. Friesen, S. Pollner, P. Hanelt. Use of chloroplast DNA polymorphisms for the phylogenetic study of Allium subgenus Amerallium and subgenus Bromatorrhiza (Alliaceae) II. Feddes Repertorium Volume 110 Issue 1–2, Pages 103–109, 1999
- Seregin, Alexey P.; Anačkov, Goran; Friesen, Nikolai (May 2015). "Molecular and morphological revision of the Allium saxatile group (Amaryllidaceae): geographical isolation as the driving force of underestimated speciation". Botanical Journal of the Linnean Society. 178 (1): 67–101. doi:10.1111/boj.12269.
- Sykorova, E.; Fajkus, J.; Meznikova, M.; Lim, K. Y.; Neplechova, K.; Blattner, F. R.; Chase, M. W.; Leitch, A. R. (1 June 2006). "Minisatellite telomeres occur in the family Alliaceae but are lost in Allium". American Journal of Botany. 93 (6): 814–823. Bibcode:2006AmJB...93..814S. doi:10.3732/ajb.93.6.814. PMID 21642143.
- Tzanoudakis, Dimitris; Trigas, Panayiotis (12 March 2015). "Allium occultum, a new species of A. sect. Codonoprasum (Amaryllidaceae) from Skiros Island (W Aegean, Greece)". Phytotaxa. 202 (2): 135. Bibcode:2015Phytx.202..135T. doi:10.11646/phytotaxa.202.2.5.
- Wheeler, E. J.; Mashayekhi, S.; McNeal, D. W.; Columbus, J. T.; Pires, J. C. (26 March 2013). "Molecular systematics of Allium subgenus Amerallium (Amaryllidaceae) in North America". American Journal of Botany. 100 (4): 701–711. Bibcode:2013AmJB..100..701W. doi:10.3732/ajb.1200641. PMID 23535771.
- Zubaida Yousaf; Zabta Khan Shinwari; Rizwana ALEEM Qureshi; Mir Ajab Khan; Syed Shahinshah Gilani (2004). "Can complexity of the genus Allium L., be resolved through some numerical techniques?" (PDF). Pak. J. Bot. 36 (3): 487–501.

=== Websites ===
- "Linnaeus Sexual System". CronkLab. Biodiversity Research Centre, University of British Columbia.
- "Allium". World Checklist of Selected Plant Families. Royal Botanic Gardens, Kew.
- DutchGrown: Alliums
- Pacific Bulb Society: Allium
  - Pacific Bulb Society: Rhizomatous Alliums
- "Genus Allium L." Germplasm Resources Information Network (GRIN Taxonomy). National Germplasm Resources Laboratory, Beltsville, Maryland: USDA, Agricultural Research Service, National Plant Germplasm System.
