= List of native plants of Flora Palaestina (A–B) =

Flora of Palestine

This is an incomplete list of 2,700 species of vascular plants which are native to the region of Palestine as defined by Flora Palaestina. Flora Palaestina is a work in four volumes published by Brill Academic Publishers between 1966 and 1986, edited by Michael Zohary and Naomi Feinbrun-Dothan. The region covered includes: the whole area of the State of Israel; the West Bank; the Gaza Strip; the Golan Heights; the Israeli-occupied part of Mount Hermon; and the East Bank, which is in Jordan.

The table below lists alphabetically all species with initial letters A–B. For other species, click here:

- C–D
- E–O
- P–Z

	Binomial name	Image	Family	Hebrew name	English name	Arabic name	Notes
1	Aaronsohnia factorovskyi		Asteraceae	אהרונסוניית פקטורי		قارصة فاكتوروفسكي	
2	Abutilon fruticosum		Malvaceae	אבוטילון השיח		أبو طيلون شجيري	
3	Abutilon hirtum		Malvaceae	אבוטילון קהה		أبو طيلون أشعث	
4	Abutilon indicum		Malvaceae	אבוטילון הודי		أبو طيلون هندي	
5	Abutilon pannosum		Malvaceae	אבוטילון לביד		أبو طيلون رث	
6	Acacia laeta		Mimosaceae	שיטה רעננה		سنط سعيد	
7	Acacia pachyceras		Mimosaceae	שיטת הנגב		سنط غليظ الحبوب	
8	Acacia raddiana		Mimosaceae	שיטה סלילנית		سنط لولبي	
9	Acacia tortilis		Mimosaceae	שיטה סוככנית		سنط ملتوي	
10	Acantholepis orientalis		Asteraceae	עקצוץ מזרחי			
11	Acantholimon libanoticum		Plumbaginaceae	חדעד הלבנון		غملول لبناني	
12	Acantholimon ulicinum		Plumbaginaceae	חדעד קפודני		غملول قنفذي	
13	Acanthus syriacus		Acanthaceae	קוציץ סורי			
14	Acer monspessulanum		Aceraceae	אדר קטן-עלים	Montpellier Maple	قيقب مونبلييه	
15	Acer obtusifolium		Aceraceae	אדר סורי		قيقب عريض الأوراق	
16	Achillea aleppica		Asteraceae	אכילאת ארם-צובא		قيصوم حلبي	
17	Achillea arabica		Asteraceae	אכילאה קטנת-פרחים		قيصوم عربي	
18	Achillea falcata		Asteraceae	אכילאה גפורה		قيصوم منجلي	
19	Achillea fragrantissima		Asteraceae	אכילאה ריחנית		قيصوم عبق	East of Azraq, gaysûma is used to make tea.
20	Achillea santolina		Asteraceae	אכילאה ערבתית		قيصوم فواح	East of Azraq, gaysûma is used to make tea.
21	Acinos rotundifolius		Lamiaceae	אקינוס ריחני			
22	Adiantum capillus-veneris		Adiantaceae	שערות-שולמית מצויות	Venus-hair fern		
23	Adonis aestivalis		Ranunculaceae	דמומית עבת-שיבולת	Summer Pheasant's-eye	أدونيس صيفي	
24	Adonis annua		Ranunculaceae	דמומית השדה	Blooddrops, etc.	أدونيس حولي	
25	Adonis dentata		Ranunculaceae	דמומית משוננת		أدونيس مسنن	
26	Adonis microcarpa		Ranunculaceae	דמומית קטנת-פרי		أدونيس صغير الثمار	
27	Adonis palaestina		Ranunculaceae	דמומית ארץ-ישראלית		أدونيس فلسطيني	
28	Aegilops bicornis		Poaceae	בן-חיטה דו-קרני		دوسر ذو القرنين	
29	Aegilops biuncialis		Poaceae	בן-חיטה דל-שיבולת		دوسر ذو البوصتين	
30	Aegilops cylindrica		Poaceae	בן-חיטה גלילני	Jointed goatgrass	دوسر أسطواني	
31	Aegilops geniculata		Poaceae	בן-חיטה ביצני		دوسر ركبي	
32	Aegilops kotschyi		Poaceae	בן-חיטה מדברי		دوسر كوتشي	
33	Aegilops longissima		Poaceae	בן-חיטה אריכא		دوسر طويل	
34	Aegilops peregrina		Poaceae	בן-חיטה רב-אנפין		دوسر أجنبي	
35	Aegilops searsii		Poaceae	בן-חיטת סירס	Sears' goatgrass	دوسر سيرسي	
36	Aegilops sharonensis		Poaceae	בן-חיטה שרוני		دوسر شاروني	
37	Aegilops speltoides		Poaceae	בן-חיטה קטוע		دوسر شبه مكنسي	
38	Aegilops triuncialis		Poaceae	בן-חיטה שלש-זיפי	Barbed goatgrass	دوسر ثلاثي البوصات	
39	Aegilops vavilovii		Poaceae	בן-חִיטת ווילוב		دوسر فافيلوفي	
40	Aeluropus lagopoides		Poaceae	כף-חתול זוחלת		عكرش قصير	
41	Aeluropus littoralis		Poaceae	כף-חתול שרועה		عكرش ساحلي	
42	Aerva javanica		Amaranthaceae	לובד המדבר			
43	Aetheorhiza bulbosa		Asteraceae	ניסנית הבולבוסין			
44	Aethionema carneum		Brassicaceae	דו-פרית מכורבלת		مشعلية لحمية	
45	Aethionema heterocarpum		Brassicaceae	דו-פרית תמימה		مشعلية متغايرة الثمار	
46	Agathophora alopecuroides		Chenopodiaceae	מתלולן הערבות		شعران ثعلبي	
47	Agrimonia eupatoria		Rosaceae	אבגר צהוב		غافث شائع	
48	Agrostemma githago		Caryophyllaceae	אגרוסטמת השדות		خرم الحنطة	
49	Agrostemma gracile		Caryophyllaceae	אגרוסטמה עדינה			
50	Agrostis stolonifera		Poaceae	נחלית השלוחות		خرم نحيل	
51	Aira elegantissima		Poaceae	אאירה נימית			
52	Aizoon canariense		Aizoaceae	חייעד קנרי			
53	Aizoon hispanicum		Aizoaceae	חייעד ספרדי		هراس، مليح	
54	Ajuga chamaepitys		Lamiaceae	חד-שפה מצוי		عجوقة أرضية	
55	Ajuga iva		Lamiaceae	חד-שפה תמים		عجوقة عطرية	
56	Ajuga orientalis		Lamiaceae	חד-שפה מזרחי			
57	Alcea acaulis		Malvaceae	חטמית עין-הפרה			
58	Alcea apterocarpa		Malvaceae	חטמית חסרת-כנפיים			
59	Alcea digitata		Malvaceae	חטמית מאוצבעת			
60	Alcea dissecta		Malvaceae	חטמית קירחת			
61	Alcea galilaea		Malvaceae	חטמית הגליל			
62	Alcea rufescens		Malvaceae	חטמית צהובה			
63	Alcea setosa		Malvaceae	חטמית זיפנית			
64	Alcea striata		Malvaceae	חטמית מסורטטת			
65	Alhagi graecorum		Papilionaceae	הגה מצויה			
66	Alisma gramineum		Alismataceae	כף-צפרדע דגנית			
67	Alisma lanceolatum		Alismataceae	כף-צפרדע אזמלנית			
68	Alisma plantago-aquatica		Alismataceae	כף-צפרדע לחכית			
69	Alkanna galilaea		Boraginaceae	אלקנת הגליל			
70	Alkanna orientalis		Boraginaceae	אלקנה מזרחית			
71	Alkanna strigosa		Boraginaceae	אלקנה סמורה			
72	Alkanna tinctoria		Boraginaceae	אלקנת הצבעים			
73	Alliaria petiolata		Brassicaceae	אליאריה שומית			
74	Allium albotunicatum		Liliaceae	שום לבן-קליפות			
75	Allium ampeloprasum		Liliaceae	שום גבוה			
76	Allium artemisietorum		Liliaceae	שום הלענה			
77	Allium aschersonianum		Liliaceae	שום אשרסון			
78	Allium calyptratum		Liliaceae	שום הכיפה			
79	Allium carmeli		Liliaceae	שום הכרמל			
80	Allium curtum		Liliaceae	שום קצר			
81	Allium daninianum		Liliaceae	שום האבקנים			
82	Allium decaisnei		Liliaceae	שום ערבתי			
83	Allium desertorum		Liliaceae	שום צנוע			
84	Allium dictyoprasum		Liliaceae	שום הרשת			
85	Allium erdelii		Liliaceae	שום ארדל			
86	Allium feinbergii		Liliaceae	שום פיינברג			
87	Allium hierochuntinum		Liliaceae	שום יריחו			
88	Allium kollmannianum		Liliaceae	שום קולמן			
89	Allium libani		Liliaceae	שום הלבנון			
90	Allium neapolitanum		Liliaceae	שום משולש			
91	Allium negevense		Liliaceae	שום דרומי			
92	Allium nigrum		Liliaceae	שום שחור			
93	Allium orientale		Liliaceae	שום מזרחי			
94	Allium pallens		Liliaceae	שום לבנבן			
95	Allium paniculatum		Liliaceae	שום ירקרק			
96	Allium papillare		Liliaceae	שום הפטמות			
97	Allium phanerantherum		Liliaceae	שום נטוי			
98	Allium pseudocalyptratum		Liliaceae	שום ההרים			
99	Allium pseudostamineum		Liliaceae	שום הפסגות			
100	Allium qasyunense		Liliaceae	שום קטן-פרחים			
101	Allium roseum		Liliaceae	שום ורוד			
102	Allium rothii		Liliaceae	שום הנגב			
103	Allium rupicola		Liliaceae	שום הסלעים			
104	Allium sannineum		Liliaceae	שום סנין			
105	Allium schubertii		Liliaceae	שום הגלגל			
106	Allium scorodoprasum		Liliaceae	שום עגול			
107	Allium sinaiticum		Liliaceae	שום סיני			
108	Allium sindjarense		Liliaceae	שום המדבר			
109	Allium tardiflorum		Liliaceae	שום סתווי			
110	Allium tel-avivense		Liliaceae	שום תל-אביבי			
111	Allium trachycoleum		Liliaceae	שום מחוספס			
112	Allium trifoliatum		Liliaceae	שום שעיר			
113	Allium truncatum		Liliaceae	שום קטוע			
114	Allium zebdanense		Liliaceae	שום זבדאני			
115	Aloe vera		Liliaceae	אלוי אמתי			
116	Alopecurus arundinaceus		Poaceae	זנב-שועל ביצתי			
117	Alopecurus myosuroides		Poaceae	זנב-שועל ארוך			
118	Alopecurus utriculatus		Poaceae	זנב-שועל מצוי			
119	Alternanthera sessilis		Amaranthaceae	ביצן מכסיף			
120	Althaea hirsuta		Malvaceae	נטופית שעירה			
121	Althaea ludwigii		Malvaceae	נטופית המדבר			
122	Althaea officinalis		Malvaceae	נטופית רפואית			
123	Alyssum aureum		Brassicaceae	אליסון קירח		drayhma	Arabic name is for the Alyssum sp.
124	Alyssum baumgartnerianum		Brassicaceae	אליסון חרמוני			
125	Alyssum condensatum		Brassicaceae	אליסון דחוס			
126	Alyssum damascenum		Brassicaceae	אליסון דמשקאי			
127	Alyssum dasycarpum		Brassicaceae	אליסון סגלגל			
128	Alyssum linifolium		Brassicaceae	אליסון זעיר			
129	Alyssum marginatum		Brassicaceae	אליסון מלול			
130	Alyssum murale		Brassicaceae	אליסון הסלעים			
131	Alyssum simplex		Brassicaceae	אליסון פשוט			
132	Alyssum strigosum		Brassicaceae	אליסון מצוי			
133	Alyssum szowitsianum		Brassicaceae	אליסון חרוטי			
134	Amaranthus blitum		Amaranthaceae	ירבוז מבריק			
135	Ambrosia maritima		Asteraceae	אמברוסיה ימית			
136	Ammannia baccifera		Lytheraceae	אמניה מצרית			
137	Ammannia prieureana		Lytheraceae	אמניה רבת-פרחים			
138	Ammi majus		Apiaceae	אמיתה גדולה			
139	Ammi visnaga		Apiaceae	אמיתה קיצית			
140	Ammochloa palaestina		Poaceae	בת-חול ארץ-ישראלית			
141	Ammophila arenaria		Poaceae	ידיד-חולות מצוי			
142	Amygdalus arabica		Rosaceae	שקד ערבי			
143	Amygdalus communis		Rosaceae	שקד מצוי			
144	Amygdalus korschinskii		Rosaceae	שקד קטן-עלים			
145	Amygdalus ramonensis		Rosaceae	שקד רמון			
146	Anabasis articulata		Chenopodiaceae	יפרוק המדבר			
147	Anabasis oropediorum		Chenopodiaceae	יפרוק הערבות			
148	Anabasis setifera		Chenopodiaceae	יפרוק זיפני			
149	Anabasis syriaca		Chenopodiaceae	יפרוק תלת-כנפי			
150	Anacamptis pyramidalis		Orchidaceae	בן-סחלב צריפי			
151	Anacyclus radiatus		Asteraceae	קחוינה מקרינה			
152	Anagallis arvensis		Primulaceae	מרגנית השדה			
153	Anagallis foemina		Primulaceae	מרגנית קטנה			
154	Anagyris foetida		Papilionaceae	צחנן מבאיש			
155	Anarrhinum forskahlii		Scrophulariaceae	חסרף מזרחי			
156	Anastatica hierochuntica		Brassicaceae	שושנת-יריחו אמיתית		kaftah, kaff Miriam, qunaifida	
157	Anchonium billardierei		Brassicaceae	אנקון פגיוני			
158	Anchusa aegyptiaca		Boraginaceae	לשון-פר מצרית			
159	Anchusa azurea		Boraginaceae	לשון-פר איטלקית			
160	Anchusa milleri		Boraginaceae	לשון-פר מדברית			
161	Anchusa ovata		Boraginaceae	לשון-פר מזרחית			
162	Anchusa strigosa		Boraginaceae	לשון-פר סמורה			
163	Anchusa undulata		Boraginaceae	לשון-פר מצויה			
164	Andrachne aspera		Euphorbiaceae	שלוחית שעירה			
165	Andrachne telephioides		Euphorbiaceae	שלוחית קירחת			
166	Androcymbium palaestinum		Liliaceae	בצלצייה ארץ-ישראלית			
167	Andropogon distachyos		Poaceae	זקניים משובלים			
168	Androsace maxima		Primulaceae	אנדרוסק חד-שנתי			
169	Andrzeiowskia cardamine		Brassicaceae	חודיים מנוצים			
170	Anemone coronaria		Ranunculaceae	כלנית מצויה			
171	Anisosciadium isosciadium		Apiaceae	סוכשך מדברי			
172	Ankyropetalum gypsophiloides		Caryophyllaceae	עוגנן נימי			
173	Anogramma leptophylla		Gymnogrammaceae	חשפונית עדינה			
174	Anthemis bornmuelleri		Asteraceae	קחוון הגליל			
175	Anthemis brachycarpa		Asteraceae	קחוון קצר-פירות			
176	Anthemis chia		Asteraceae	קחוון יווני			
177	Anthemis cornucopiae		Asteraceae	קחוון רב-קרניים			
178	Anthemis cotula		Asteraceae	קחוון מקפח			
179	Anthemis edumea		Asteraceae	קחוון אדומי			
180	Anthemis eliezrae		Asteraceae	קחוון אליעזר			
181	Anthemis haussknechtii		Asteraceae	קחוון גולני			
182	Anthemis hebronica		Asteraceae	קחוון חברוני			
183	Anthemis hyalina		Asteraceae	קחוון שקוף			
184	Anthemis leucanthemifolia		Asteraceae	קחוון החוף			
185	Anthemis maris-mortui		Asteraceae	קחון ים-המלח			
186	Anthemis melampodina		Asteraceae	קחון הנגב		arbayyân, 'arbiyyân	
187	Anthemis nabataea		Asteraceae	קחון נבטי			
188	Anthemis palestina		Asteraceae	קחוון ארץ-ישראלי			
189	Anthemis parvifolia		Asteraceae	קחוון קטן-עלים			
190	Anthemis pauciloba		Asteraceae	קחוון דל-אונות			
191	Anthemis pseudocotula		Asteraceae	קחוון מצוי			
192	Anthemis rascheyana		Asteraceae	קחוון החרמון			
193	Anthemis scrobicularis		Asteraceae	קחוון הגממות			
194	Anthemis tinctoria		Asteraceae	קחוון הצבעים			
195	Anthemis zoharyana		Asteraceae	קחון זהרי			
196	Anthephora laevis		Poaceae	שחורן חלק			
197	Anthriscus lamprocarpus		Apiaceae	סייגית מבריקה			
198	Anticharis glandulosa		Scrophulariaceae	אנטיכריס בלוטי			
199	Antinoria insularis		Poaceae	אנטינוריית האיים			
200	Antirrhinum majus		Scrophulariaceae	לוע-ארי גדול			
201	Antirrhinum siculum		Scrophulariaceae	לוע-ארי סיצילי			
202	Anvillea garcinii		Asteraceae	מרית מדברית			
203	Aphanes arvensis		Rosaceae	עטייה זעירה			
204	Apium graveolens		Apiaceae	כרפס ריחני			
205	Apium nodiflorum		Apiaceae	כרפס הביצות			
206	Arabidopsis pumila		Brassicaceae	תודרנית קטנה			
207	Arabidopsis thaliana		Brassicaceae	תודרנית לבנה			
208	Arabis alpina		Brassicaceae	ארביס קווקזי			
209	Arabis aucheri		Brassicaceae	ארביס אושה			
210	Arabis auriculata		Brassicaceae	ארביס אוזני			
211	Arabis turrita		Brassicaceae	ארביס נאה			
212	Arabis verna		Brassicaceae	ארביס אביבי			
213	Arbutus andrachne		Ericaceae	קטלב מצוי			
214	Arenaria cassia		Caryophyllaceae	ארנריה חרמונית			
215	Arenaria deflexa		Caryophyllaceae	ארנריית הסלעים			
216	Arenaria leptoclados		Caryophyllaceae	ארנריה מצויה			
217	Arenaria tremula		Caryophyllaceae	ארנריה נימית			
218	Argyrolobium crotalarioides		Papilionaceae	כספסף רחב-פרי			
219	Argyrolobium uniflorum		Papilionaceae	כספסף חד-פרחי			
220	Arisarum vulgare		Araceae	לופית מצויה			
221	Aristida adscensionis		Poaceae	תלת-מלען מצוי			
222	Aristida sieberiana		Poaceae	תלת-מלען ארוך			
223	Aristolochia billardierei		Aristolochiaceae	ספלול הגליל			
224	Aristolochia bottae		Aristolochiaceae	ספלול השדה			
225	Aristolochia paecilantha		Aristolochiaceae	ספלול ססגוני			
226	Aristolochia parvifolia		Aristolochiaceae	ספלול קטן			
227	Aristolochia scabridula		Aristolochiaceae	ספלול מחוספס			
228	Aristolochia sempervirens		Aristolochiaceae	ספלול מטפס			
229	Arnebia decumbens		Boraginaceae	ארנבית שרועה			
230	Arnebia hispidissima		Boraginaceae	ארנבית זיפנית			
231	Arnebia linearifolia		Boraginaceae	ארנבית צרת-עלים			
232	Arnebia tinctoria		Boraginaceae	ארנבית הצבעים			
233	Arrhenatherum kotschyi		Poaceae	בולבסן קוטשי			
234	Arrhenatherum palaestinum		Poaceae	בולבסן ארץ-ישראלי			
235	Artedia squamata		Apiaceae	שפרירה קשקשנית			
236	Artemisia arborescens		Asteraceae	לענה שיחנית			
237	Artemisia jordanica		Asteraceae	לענת עבר-הירדן			
238	Artemisia judaica		Asteraceae	לענת יהודה			
239	Artemisia monosperma		Asteraceae	לענה חד-זרעית			
240	Artemisia scoparia		Asteraceae	לענת המכבד			
241	Artemisia sieberi		Asteraceae	לענת המדבר		shîh	
242	Arthrocnemum macrostachyum		Chenopodiaceae	בן-מלח מכחיל			
243	Arum dioscoridis		Araceae	לוף מנומר			
244	Arum elongatum		Araceae	לוף מוארך			
245	Arum hygrophilum		Araceae	לוף ירוק			
246	Arum palaestinum		Araceae	לוף ארץ-ישראלי			
247	Arundo donax		Poaceae	עבקנה שכיח			
248	Arundo mediterranea		Poaceae	עבקנה נדיר			
249	Asparagus acutifolius		Liliaceae	אספרג חד			
250	Asparagus aphyllus		Liliaceae	אספרג החורש			
251	Asparagus horridus		Liliaceae	אספרג ארוך-עלים			
252	Asparagus palaestinus		Liliaceae	אספרג ארץ-ישראלי			
253	Asperugo procumbens		Boraginaceae	חספסת שרועה			
254	Asperula arvensis		Rubiaceae	חספסנית השדה			
255	Asperula glomerata		Rubiaceae	חספסנית כדורית			
256	Asperula libanotica		Rubiaceae	חספסנית הלבנון			
257	Asperula setosa		Rubiaceae	חספסנית זיפית			
258	Asphodeline brevicaulis		Liliaceae	עיריוני קצר			
259	Asphodeline lutea		Liliaceae	עיריוני צהוב			
260	Asphodeline recurva		Liliaceae	עיריוני כפוף			
261	Asphodelus aestivus		Liliaceae	עירית גדולה			
262	Asphodelus fistulosus		Liliaceae	עירית נבובה			
263	Asphodelus ramosus		Liliaceae	עירית גדולה			
264	Asphodelus refractus		Liliaceae	עירית נטויה			
265	Asphodelus tenuifolius		Liliaceae	עירית צרת-עלים			
266	Asphodelus viscidulus		Liliaceae	עירית דביקה			
267	Asplenium ceterach		Aspleniaceae	דנדנה רפואית			
268	Asplenium onoptreis		Aspleniaceae	אספלנון שחור			
269	Asplenium ruta-muraria		Aspleniaceae	אספלנון הנקיקים			
270	Asplenium sagittatum		Aspleniaceae	גריזית נאה			
271	Asplenium scolopendrium		Aspleniaceae	גריזית אירופית			
272	Asplenium trichomanes		Aspleniaceae	אספלנון הגליל			
273	Aster tripolium		Asteraceae	אסתר הביצות			
274	Asteriscus aquaticus		Asteraceae	כוכב מצוי			
275	Asteriscus graveolens		Asteraceae	כוכב ריחני			
276	Asteriscus hierochunticus		Asteraceae	כוכב ננסי			
277	Asterolinon linum-stellatum		Primulaceae	זעריר כוכבני			
278	Astomaea seselifolium		Apiaceae	אסתום מצוי			
279	Astragalus aleppicus		Papilionaceae	קדד פיינברון			
280	Astragalus amalecitanus		Papilionaceae	קדד הנגב			
281	Astragalus angustifolius		Papilionaceae	קדד חרמוני			
282	Astragalus annularis		Papilionaceae	קדד הטבעות		gafâ'a	
283	Astragalus arpilobus		Papilionaceae	קדד מדברי			
284	Astragalus asterias		Papilionaceae	קדד מצליב			
285	Astragalus berytheus		Papilionaceae	קדד בירותי			
286	Astragalus bethlehemiticus		Papilionaceae	קדד בית-הלחמי			
287	Astragalus boeticus		Papilionaceae	קדד ספרדי			
288	Astragalus bombycinus		Papilionaceae	קדד משייני			
289	Astragalus brachystachys		Papilionaceae	קדד קצר-שיבלת			
290	Astragalus callichrous		Papilionaceae	קדד יפה			
291	Astragalus campylorrhynchus		Papilionaceae	קדד דמשקאי			
292	Astragalus caprinus		Papilionaceae	קדד באר-שבע			
293	Astragalus cephalotes		Papilionaceae	קדד הראשים			
294	Astragalus coluteoides		Papilionaceae	קדד קרקשי			
295	Astragalus crenatus		Papilionaceae	קדד מקומט			
296	Astragalus cretaceus		Papilionaceae	קדד נאה			
297	Astragalus cruentiflorus		Papilionaceae	קדד אדום-פרחים			
298	Astragalus dactylocarpus		Papilionaceae	קדד הסיף			
299	Astragalus deinacanthus		Papilionaceae	קדד קוצני			
300	Astragalus echinus		Papilionaceae	קדד קיפודי			
301	Astragalus emarginatus		Papilionaceae	קדד מפורץ			
302	Astragalus epiglottis		Papilionaceae	קדד זעיר			
303	Astragalus eremophilus		Papilionaceae	קדד הישימון			
304	Astragalus fruticosus		Papilionaceae	קדד לביד			
305	Astragalus gummifer		Papilionaceae	קדד השרף			
306	Astragalus guttatus		Papilionaceae	קדד מכופל			
307	Astragalus hamosus		Papilionaceae	קדד האנקולים			
308	Astragalus hispidulus		Papilionaceae	קדד שעיר			
309	Astragalus intercedens		Papilionaceae	קדד ים-המלח			
310	Astragalus kahiricus		Papilionaceae	קדד קהירי			
311	Astragalus lanatus		Papilionaceae	קדד צמיר			
312	Astragalus macrocarpus		Papilionaceae	קדד גדול-פרי			
313	Astragalus oocephalus		Papilionaceae	קדד הקרקפות			
314	Astragalus palaestinus		Papilionaceae	קדד ארץ-ישראלי			
315	Astragalus pelecinus		Papilionaceae	מסוריים מצויים			
316	Astragalus peregrinus		Papilionaceae	קדד האצבעות			
317	Astragalus pinetorum		Papilionaceae	קדד האורנים			
318	Astragalus sanctus		Papilionaceae	קדד קדוש			
319	Astragalus schimperi		Papilionaceae	קדד שימפר			
320	Astragalus scorpioides		Papilionaceae	קדד עקרבי			
321	Astragalus sieberi		Papilionaceae	קדד סיבר			
322	Astragalus sparsus		Papilionaceae	קדד דליל			
323	Astragalus spinosus		Papilionaceae	קדד משולחף		shitâde	
324	Astragalus tribuloides		Papilionaceae	קדד קוטבי			
325	Astragalus trimestris		Papilionaceae	קדד אפיל			
326	Asyneuma rigidum		Campanulaceae	פודנתון אזמלני			
327	Atractylis cancellata		Asteraceae	חורשף השבכה			
328	Atractylis carduus		Asteraceae	חורשף צהוב			
329	Atractylis comosa		Asteraceae	חורשף מצויץ			
330	Atractylis mernephthae		Asteraceae	חורשף מצרי			
331	Atractylis phaeolepis		Asteraceae	חורשף חום-קשקשים			
332	Atractylis prolifera		Asteraceae	חורשף נאה			
333	Atractylis serratuloides		Asteraceae	חורשף קטן-קרקפות			
334	Atraphaxis billardierei		Polygonaceae	גפוף החרמון			
335	Atraphaxis spinosa		Polygonaceae	גפוף קוצני			
336	Atriplex davisii		Chenopodiaceae	מלוח דיוויס			
337	Atriplex dimorphostegia		Chenopodiaceae	מלוח שנוי-פירות			
338	Atriplex glauca		Chenopodiaceae	מלוח קטן-עלים			
339	Atriplex halimus		Chenopodiaceae	מלוח קיפח			
340	Atriplex lasiantha		Chenopodiaceae	מלוח שעיר-פרח			
341	Atriplex leucoclada		Chenopodiaceae	מלוח מלבין			
342	Atriplex portulacoides		Chenopodiaceae	מלוח רגלני			
343	Atriplex prostrata		Chenopodiaceae	מלוח מפושק			
344	Atriplex rosea		Chenopodiaceae	מלוח ההרים			
345	Atriplex sagitata		Chenopodiaceae	מלוח מבריק			
346	Atriplex tatarica		Chenopodiaceae	מלוח טטרי			
347	Avena barbata		Poaceae	שיבולת-שועל מתפרקת			
348	Avena clauda		Poaceae	שיבולת-שועל שונת-גלומות			
349	Avena eriantha		Poaceae	שיבולת-שועל צמרית			
350	Avena fatua		Poaceae	שיבולת-שועל שוטה			
351	Avena longiglumis		Poaceae	שיבולת-שועל גדולה			
352	Avena sterilis		Poaceae	שיבולת-שועל נפוצה			
353	Avena wiestii		Poaceae	שיבולת-שועל ערבתית			
354	Bacopa monnieri		Scrophulariaceae	פשטה שרועה			
355	Balanites aegyptiaca		Zygophyllaceae	זקום מצרי			
356	Ballota nigra		Lamiaceae	גלונית מבאישה			
357	Ballota philistaea		Lamiaceae	גלונית פלשתית			
358	Ballota saxatilis		Lamiaceae	גלונית הסלעים			
359	Ballota undulata		Lamiaceae	גלונית מצויה			
360	Barbarea brachycarpa		Brassicaceae	ברבראה קטנה			
361	Bassia arabica		Chenopodiaceae	בסיה ערבית			
362	Bassia eriophora		Chenopodiaceae	בסיה צמירה			
363	Bassia muricata		Chenopodiaceae	בסיה שיכנית			
364	Beckmannia eruciformis		Poaceae	בקמניה דו-טורית			
365	Bellardia trixago		Scrophulariaceae	עלוק מצוי			
366	Bellevalia densiflora		Liliaceae	זמזומית צפופת-פרחים			
367	Bellevalia desertorum		Liliaceae	זמזומית המדבר			
368	Bellevalia eigii		Liliaceae	זמזומית איג			
369	Bellevalia flexuosa		Liliaceae	זמזומית מצויה			
370	Bellevalia hermonis		Liliaceae	זמזומית החרמון			
371	Bellevalia longipes		Liliaceae	זמזומית מפושקת			
372	Bellevalia macrobotrys		Liliaceae	זמזומית ארוכה			
373	Bellevalia mosheovii		Liliaceae	זמזומית מושיוף			
374	Bellevalia stepporum		Liliaceae	זמזומית הערבות			
375	Bellevalia trifoliata		Liliaceae	זמזומית סגולה			
376	Bellevalia warburgii		Liliaceae	זמזומית ורבורג			
377	Bellevalia zoharyi		Liliaceae	זמזומית זהרי			
378	Bellis annua		Asteraceae	חיננית חד-שנתית			
379	Bellis perennis		Asteraceae	חיננית רב-שנתית			
380	Bellis sylvestris		Asteraceae	חיננית הבתה			
381	Berberis cretica		Berberidaceae	ברברית הלבנון			
382	Bergia ammannioides		Elatinaceae	ברגייה אמנית			
383	Berula erecta		Apiaceae	ברולה זקופה			
384	Beta vulgaris		Chenopodiaceae	סלק מצוי			
385	Biarum angustatum		Araceae	אחילוף צר-עלים			
386	Biarum auraniticum		Araceae	אחילוף החורן			
387	Biarum bovei		Araceae	אחילוף קטן			
388	Biarum olivieri		Araceae	אחילוף זעיר			
389	Biarum pyrami		Araceae	אחילוף הגליל			
390	Bidens tripartita		Asteraceae	דו-שן משולש			
391	Biebersteinia multifida		Geraniaceae	ביברשטייניה שסועה			
392	Bifora testiculata		Apiaceae	חריריים מצויים			
393	Bilacunaria boissieri		Apiaceae	שומרר בואסיה			
394	Biscutella didyma		Brassicaceae	מצלתיים מצויות			
395	Bituminaria bituminosa		Papilionaceae	שרעול שעיר			
396	Blackstonia perfoliata		Gentianaceae	חוורית חרוזה			
397	Blepharis attenuata		Acanthaceae	ריסן דק			
398	Boerhavia repens		Nyctaginaceae	בורהביה זוחלת			
399	Boissiera squarrosa		Poaceae	בואסיירה מצויצת			
400	Bolanthus filicaulis		Caryophyllaceae	בולנתוס דק-גבעול			
401	Bolanthus hirsutus		Caryophyllaceae	בולנתוס שעיר			
402	Bongardia chrysogonum		Berberidaceae	כרבולתן השדות			
403	Boreava aptera		Brassicaceae	בורובית תמימה			
404	Brachiaria eruciformis		Poaceae	דוחנן דק			
405	Brachypodium distachyum		Poaceae	עוקצר מצוי			
406	Brachypodium sylvaticum		Poaceae	עוקצר היערות			
407	Brassica cretica		Brassicaceae	כרוב כרתי			
408	Brassica napus		Brassicaceae	כרוב הנפוס			
409	Brassica nigra		Brassicaceae	כרוב שחור			
410	Brassica tournefortii		Brassicaceae	כרוב החוף		khafsh خفش	
411	Briza maxima		Poaceae	זעזועית גדולה			
412	Briza minor		Poaceae	זעזועית קטנה			
413	Bromus alopecuros		Poaceae	ברומית זנב-שועל			
414	Bromus chrysopogon		Poaceae	ברומית זהובה			
415	Bromus commutatus		Poaceae	ברומית מתפרקת			
416	Bromus danthoniae		Poaceae	ברומית רבת-מלענים			
417	Bromus diandrus		Poaceae	ברומית דו-אבקנית			
418	Bromus fasciculatus		Poaceae	ברומית מאוגדת			
419	Bromus haussknechtii		Poaceae	ברומית מואבית			
420	Bromus intermedius		Poaceae	ברומית בינונית			
421	Bromus japonicus		Poaceae	ברומית יפנית			
422	Bromus lanceolatus		Poaceae	ברומית אזמלנית			
423	Bromus madritensis		Poaceae	ברומית ספרדית			
424	Bromus pseudobrachystachys		Poaceae	ברומית קצרת-שיבולית			
425	Bromus rigidus		Poaceae	ברומית שעירה			
426	Bromus rubens		Poaceae	ברומית אדמונית			
427	Bromus scoparius		Poaceae	ברומית המטאטא			
428	Bromus sericeus		Poaceae	ברומית המשי			
429	Bromus sterilis		Poaceae	ברומית עקרה			
430	Bromus syriacus		Poaceae	ברומית סורית			
431	Bromus tectorum		Poaceae	ברומית הגגות			
432	Bromus tigridis		Poaceae	ברומית המכבד			
433	Bromus tomentellus		Poaceae	ברומית לבדנית			
434	Brunnera orientalis		Boraginaceae	תכלתן מזרחי			
435	Bryonia cretica		Cucurbitaceae	דלעת-נחש מצויה			
436	Bryonia syriaca		Cucurbitaceae	דלעת-נחש סורית			
437	Bufonia ramonensis		Caryophyllaceae	בופונית רמון			
438	Bufonia virgata		Caryophyllaceae	בופוניה אשונה			
439	Buglossoides arvensis		Boraginaceae	גלעינית השדה			
440	Buglossoides incrassata		Boraginaceae	גלעינית עבת-עוקץ			
441	Buglossoides tenuiflora		Boraginaceae	גלעינית זעירת-פרחים			
442	Bunium ferulaceum		Apiaceae	פקעון הכלך			
443	Bunium paucifolium		Apiaceae	פקעון נאה			
444	Bunium pestalozzae		Apiaceae	פקעון פסטלוצי			
445	Bupleurum boissieri		Apiaceae	צלע-שור בואסיה			
446	Bupleurum brevicaule		Apiaceae	צלע-שור אשונה			
447	Bupleurum gerardii		Apiaceae	צלע-שור זקופה			
448	Bupleurum lancifolium		Apiaceae	צלע-שור אזמלנית			
449	Bupleurum libanoticum		Apiaceae	צלע-שור לבנונית			
450	Bupleurum nodiflorum		Apiaceae	צלע-שור קטנה			
451	Bupleurum odontites		Apiaceae	צלע-שור מעורקת			
452	Bupleurum orientale		Apiaceae	צלע-שור דקיקה			
453	Bupleurum semicompositum		Apiaceae	צלע-שור ערבתית			
454	Bupleurum subovatum		Apiaceae	צלע-שור חרוזה			
455	Butomus umbellatus		Butomaceae	בוציץ סוככני			

== Bibliography ==
- Lancaster, William; Lancaster, Fidelity (1999). People, land and water in the Arab Middle East: environments and landscapes in the Bilâd ash-Shâm. Taylor & Francis. ISBN 978-90-5702-322-4.
- Zohary, Michael; Feinbrun-Dothan, Naomi (1972). Flora Palaestina, Part 2, Volume 2. Israel Academy of Sciences and Humanities.
