= Allium croaticum =

Scientific classification
- Kingdom: Plantae
- Clade: Tracheophytes
- Clade: Angiosperms
- Clade: Monocots
- Order: Asparagales
- Family: Amaryllidaceae
- Subfamily: Allioideae
- Genus: Allium
- Species: A. croaticum

Binomial name
- Allium croaticum Bogdanovic, Brullo, Mitic & Salmeri

Species of plant

Allium croaticum is a species of flowering plant in the genus Allium (onions) found only on the island of Vis in Croatia. It represents the westernmost population of the Allium stamineum group in the Mediterranean region.

== Description ==
Allium croaticum (Croatian garlic) grows from an ovoid bulb measuring 15–18 mm long and 10–12 mm wide, with whitish membranous outer coverings that sometimes turn dark brown. The stem is cylindrical, smooth, erect, and reaches 20–30 cm in height, with the lower half covered by leaf sheaths. The plant typically has 3–4 semicylindrical, smooth leaves with a bluish-green colouration and ribbed texture, measuring 10–23 cm long and about 1 mm wide.

The flower structure features a persistent spathe (a bract that encloses the developing flowers) with two unequal valves that extend beyond the flower cluster itself. The larger valve has 7 nerves and measures 4–6.5 cm long, while the smaller valve has 5 nerves and is 2–3 cm long.

The inflorescence (flower cluster) is loose and expanded, measuring 3–3.5 cm in diameter and containing 25–40 individual flowers on stalks of varying lengths (5–25 mm). The flowers have a bell-shaped form with equal tepals (petal-like structures) that are yellowish-green with brown-purple tinges. These tepals are elliptical, rounded at the tips, and measure 3.5–4 mm long by 1.3–1.5 mm wide, with a green-brown midrib.

The stamens (male reproductive organs) extend beyond the tepals, with pure white filaments measuring 3–4.5 mm long that join at the base to form a ring-like structure 0.4–0.7 mm high. The pollen-bearing anthers are yellow, elliptical, 1.3–1.4 mm long and 0.7–0.8 mm wide, with a small point at the tip.

The ovary (female reproductive structure) is obovoid (egg-shaped but wider at the top), green, with small tubercles on its upper portion, measuring 1.6–1.8 mm long and 1.6 mm wide. The style (stalk connecting the ovary to the stigma) is white and 1.2–1.3 mm long. After fertilization, the plant produces a three-valved, obovoid seed capsule measuring 4 mm in both length and width, coloured green with brown-purplish tones.

== Taxonomy ==
Allium croaticum was first described by Sandro Bogdanović, Salvatore Brullo, Božena Mitić, and Cristina Salmeri in 2008 following field investigations on the island of Vis in Central Dalmatia, Croatia. The species epithet croaticum is derived from Croatia, referring to its native region. The researchers discovered several populations of this distinctive Allium growing on mountain slopes, which upon detailed morphological analysis and comparison with herbarium specimens and literature records, was confirmed to be new to science.

Taxonomically, A. croaticum belongs to Allium section Codonoprasum, as evidenced by its two very long unequal spathes that exceed the inflorescence, simple stamens, and ovary with inconspicuous nectaries. Within this section, it shows closest relationships with taxa of the Allium stamineum group, particularly in having a lax inflorescence and flowers with long exserted stamens.

Allium croaticum is well differentiated from all known species of the A. stamineum group based on its morphological features, leaf anatomy, and karyotype arrangement. It shows particularly close affinity to A. stamineum in the strict sense (native to southwestern Anatolia) and A. guicciardii (occurring in Central and Northern Greece and Romania) based on its greenish-yellow perigonium, tepal shape, and ovary characteristics, but can be distinguished from both by multiple morphological differences.

Prior to this discovery, no population belonging to the A. stamineum group had been previously recorded in Croatia. A. croaticum represents the first record for this group in the region and is considered the most western population among those known, along with A. garganicum from Apulia, Italy. Its somewhat geographical isolation suggests that A. croaticum may be a relict eastern element, probably dating back to when populations belonging to the A. stamineum group had a wider distribution in the western Mediterranean.
