= Allium stamineum =

Scientific classification
- Kingdom: Plantae
- Clade: Embryophytes
- Clade: Tracheophytes
- Clade: Spermatophytes
- Clade: Angiosperms
- Clade: Monocots
- Order: Asparagales
- Family: Amaryllidaceae
- Subfamily: Allioideae
- Genus: Allium
- Subgenus: A. subg. Allium
- Species: A. stamineum

Binomial name
- Allium stamineum Boiss.

Synonyms
- Allium moly var. stamineum (Boiss.) Nyman; Allium kossoricum var. araratense Miscz.; Allium effusum Boiss.; Allium fastigiatum Candargy

Species of flowering plant

Allium stamineum is a species of flowering plant in the Amaryllidaceae family. It is an onion found in the Middle East (from the islands of the eastern Aegean south to Saudi Arabia and east to Iran).

formerly included

Two names have been coined for taxa at the varietal and subspecific levels for plants now classified by the World Checklist as distinct species.

- Allium stamineum var. alpinum Post – now called Allium rupicola Boiss. ex Mouterde
- Allium stamineum subsp. decaisnei (C.Presl) Kollmann – now called Allium decaisnei C.Presl
