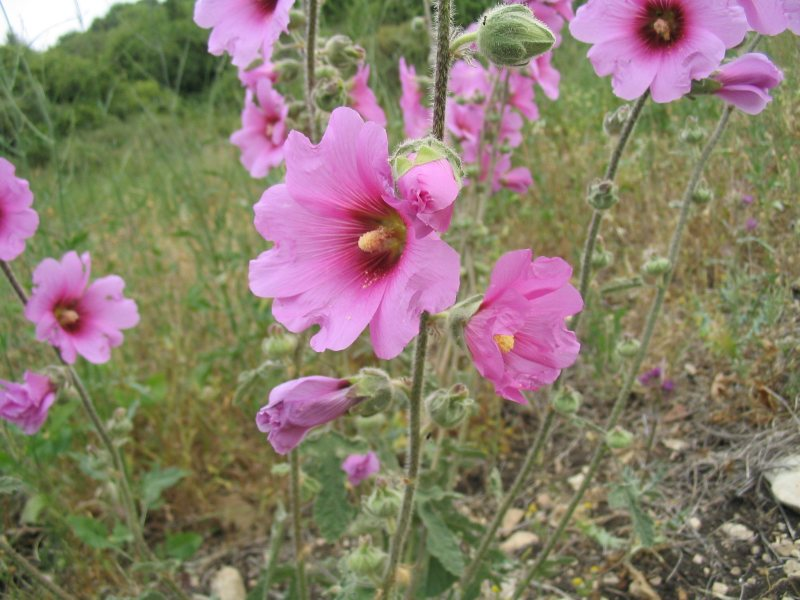
- Alcea setosa

Scientific classification
- Kingdom: Plantae
- Clade: Embryophytes
- Clade: Tracheophytes
- Clade: Angiosperms
- Clade: Eudicots
- Clade: Rosids
- Clade: Malvids
- Order: Malvales; Juss. ex Bercht. & J.Presl

Families
- Bixaceae (including Cochlospermaceae, Diegodendraceae); Cistaceae; Cytinaceae; Dipterocarpaceae; Malvaceae; Muntingiaceae; Neuradaceae; Sarcolaenaceae; Sphaerosepalaceae; Thymelaeaceae

= Malvales =

Malvales Temporal range: Campanian - recent

Order of flowering plants

The Malvales are an order of flowering plants. As circumscribed by APG II-system, the order includes about 6000 species within nine families. The order is placed in the eurosids II, which are part of the eudicots.

The plants are mostly shrubs and trees; most of its families have a cosmopolitan distribution in the tropics and subtropics, with limited expansion into temperate regions. An interesting distribution occurs in Madagascar, where three endemic families of Malvales (Sphaerosepalaceae, Sarcolaenaceae and Diegodendraceae) occur.

Many species of Malvaceae, sensu lato (in the broad sense), are valued for their wood, with that of Ochroma (balsa) being known for its lightness, and that of Tilia (lime, linden, or basswood) as a popular wood for carving. Fruit of the cacao tree (Theobroma cacao) are used as an ingredient for chocolate. Kola nuts (genus Cola) are notable for their high caffeine content and were commonly used in the past in preparation of various cola drinks. They are still in use as a stimulant, particularly in West Africa where they are chewed for this effect. Other well-known members of Malvales in the APG II sense are daphnes, hibiscus, hollyhocks, okra, jute, baobab trees, cotton, kapok (which mostly comes from Ceiba pentandra, but also from other "Kapok trees" also of Malvales, such as Bombax ceiba), and durian.

== Description ==
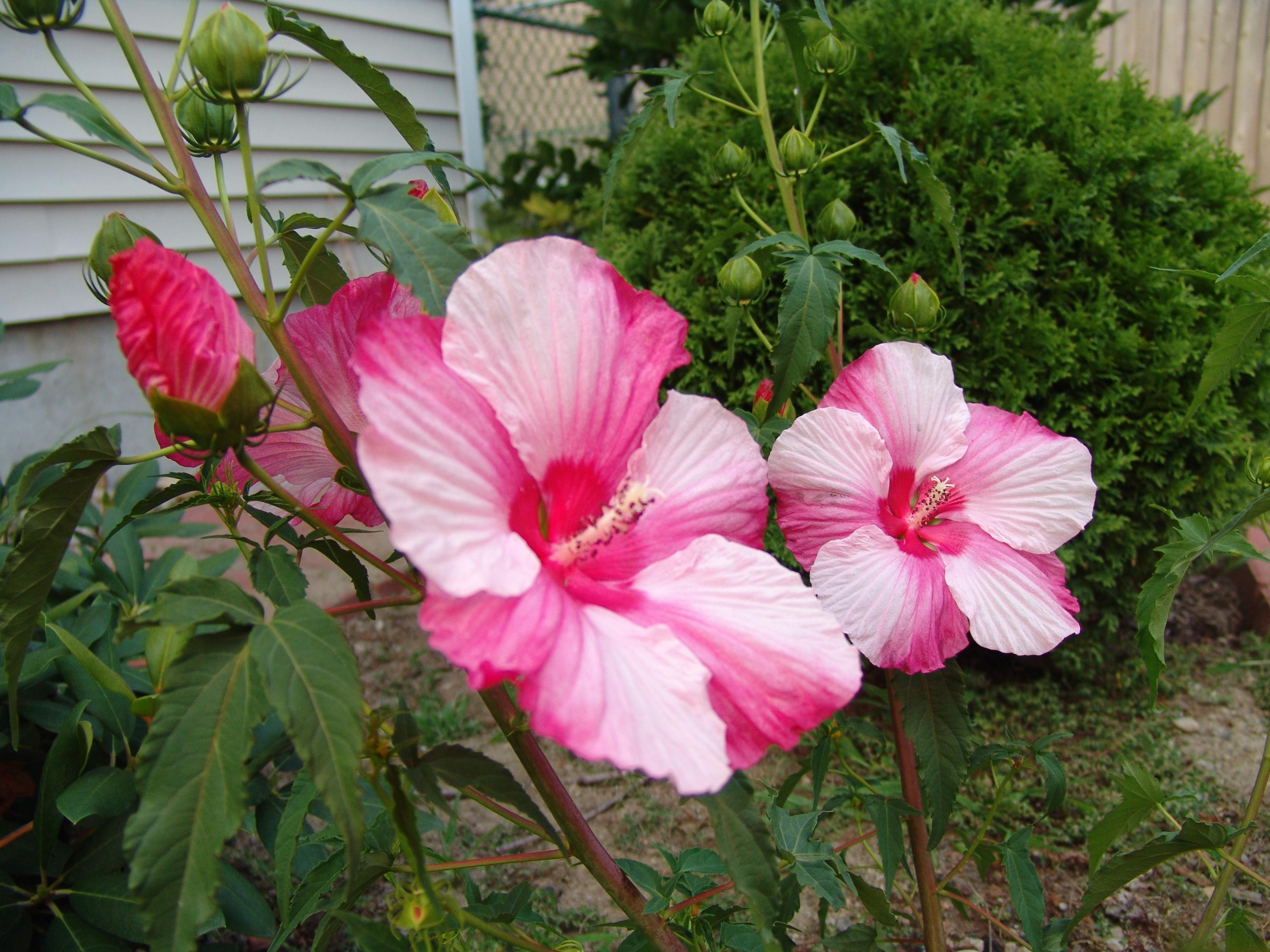
Hibiscus moscheutos

The morphology of Malvales is diverse, with few common characteristics. Among those most commonly encountered are leaf shapes in compound palmate form, filaments which are connate, and a specific structure and chemical composition of the seeds. The cortex is often fibrous, built of soft phloem layers.

== Taxonomy ==
Early classifications such as that of Dahlgren placed the Malvales in the superorder Malviflorae (also called Malvanae). Family boundaries and circumscriptions of the "core" Malvales families, Malvaceae, Bombacaceae, Tiliaceae, and Sterculiaceae, have long been problematic. A close relationship among these families, and particularly Malvaceae and Bombacaceae, has generally been recognized, although until recently most classification systems have maintained them as separate families. With numerous molecular phylogenies showing Sterculiaceae, Bombacaceae, and Tiliaceae as traditionally defined are either paraphyletic or polyphyletic, a consensus has been emerging for a trend to expand Malvaceae to include these three families. This expanded circumscription of Malvaceae has been recognized in the most recent version of the Thorne system, by the Angiosperm Phylogeny Group, and in the most recent comprehensive treatment of vascular plant families and genera, the Kubitzki system.

The dominant family in the APG II-system is the extended Malvaceae (Malvaceae sensu lato) with over 4225 species, followed by Thymelaeaceae with 898 species. This expanded circumscription of Malvaceae is taken to include the families Bombacaceae, Sterculiaceae and Tiliaceae. Under the older Cronquist system the order contained these four "core Malvales" families plus the Elaeocarpaceae and was placed among the Dilleniidae. Some of the currently included families were placed by Cronquist in the Violales.

== Phylogeny ==
The APG IV gives the following cladogram for Malvales phylogeny.

- Malvales
  - Neuradaceae
  - - Thymelaeaceae
    - - Bixaceae
      - Malvaceae
      - Sphaerosepalaceae
      - - Cytinaceae
        - Muntingiaceae
      - - Cistaceae
        - - Dipterocarpaceae
          - Sarcolaenaceae

== Bibliography ==
- Alverson, W. S., K. G. Karol, D. A. Baum, M. W. Chase, S. M. Swensen, R. McCourt, and K. J. Sytsma (1998). Circumscription of the Malvales and relationships to other Rosidae: Evidence from rbcL sequence data. American Journal of Botany 85, 876–887. (Available online: Abstract Archived 2010-06-26 at the Wayback Machine)
- Edlin, H. L. 1935. A critical revision of certain taxonomic groups of the Malvales. New Phytologist 34: 1-20, 122–143.
- Judd, W.S., C. S. Campbell, E. A. Kellogg, P. F. Stevens, M. J. Donoghue (2002). Plant Systematics: A Phylogenetic Approach, 2nd edition. pp. 405–410 (Malvales). Sinauer Associates, Sunderland, Massachusetts. ISBN 0-87893-403-0.
- Kubitzki, K. and M. W. Chase. 2003. Introduction to Malvales, pp. 12– 16. In K. Kubitzki (ed.), The Families and Genera of Vascular Plants, vol. 5, Malvales, Capparales and non-betalain Caryophyllales.
- du Mortier, B. C. J. (1829). Analyse des Familles de Plantes, avec l'indication des principaux genres qui s'y rattachent, p. 43. Imprimerie de J. Casterman, Tournay.
- Watson, L., and Dallwitz, M. J. (1992 onwards). The families of flowering plants: descriptions, illustrations, identification, and information retrievalThe families of flowering plants: descriptions, illustrations, identification, and information retrieval. http://delta-intkey.com
- Whitlock, B. A. (October 2001). Malvales (Mallow). In: Nature Encyclopedia of Life Sciences. Nature Publishing Group, London. (Available online: DOI | ELS site)
