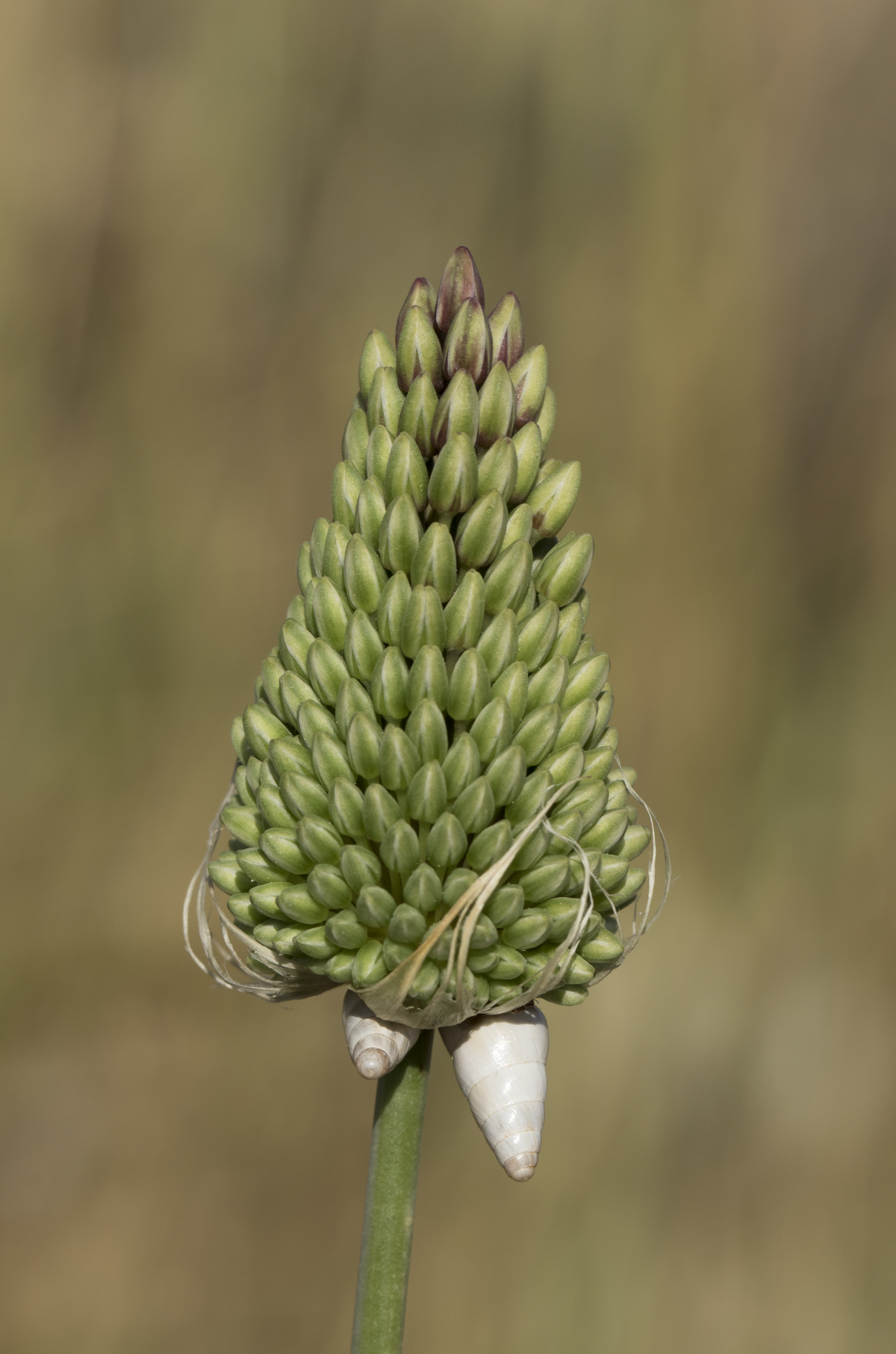

Scientific classification
- Kingdom: Plantae
- Clade: Tracheophytes
- Clade: Angiosperms
- Clade: Monocots
- Order: Asparagales
- Family: Amaryllidaceae
- Subfamily: Allioideae
- Genus: Allium
- Subgenus: A. subg. Allium
- Species: A. curtum

Binomial name
- Allium curtum Boiss. & Gaill.

Synonyms
- Allium aegyptiacum (Täckh. & Drar) Seregin; Allium curtum subsp. aegyptiacum Täckh. & Drar; Allium sphaerocephalon subsp. curtum (Boiss. & Gaill.) Duyfjes; Allium curtum subsp. typicum Feinbrun; Allium sanctum Seregin

= Allium curtum =

Species of plant

Allium curtum is species of flowering plant in the amaryllis family, Amaryllidaceae. It is native to Cyprus, Egypt, Lebanon, Palestine, the Sinai Peninsula, Syria and Turkey. It is a bulb-forming perennial producing a tight, head-like umbel of green or purple flowers.

Subspecies accepted

- Allium curtum subsp. curtum - Egypt incl Sinai, Israel, Palestine, Jordan, Lebanon, Syria, Turkey, Cyprus
- Allium curtum subsp. palaestinum Feinbrun - Rafah region in northeastern Sinai
