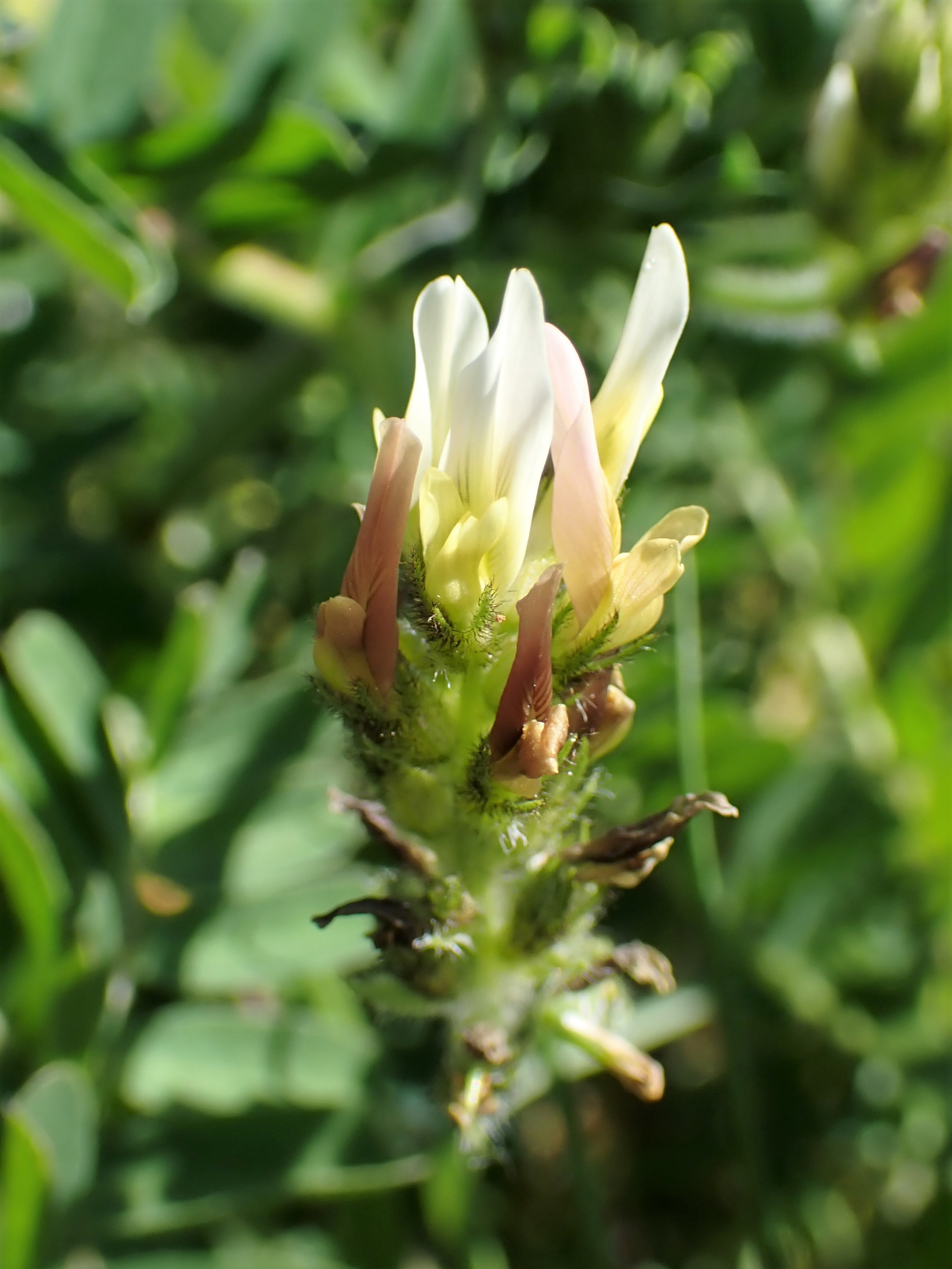

Scientific classification
- Kingdom: Plantae
- Clade: Embryophytes
- Clade: Tracheophytes
- Clade: Angiosperms
- Clade: Eudicots
- Clade: Rosids
- Order: Fabales
- Family: Fabaceae
- Subfamily: Faboideae
- Genus: Astragalus
- Species: A. boeticus

Binomial name
- Astragalus boeticus L.

Synonyms
- Tragacantha boetica (L.) Kuntze; Triquetra boetica (L.) Medik.

= Astragalus boeticus =

Species of plant

Astragalus boeticus, the yellow milk vetch, or Swedish coffee is a species of annual herb in the family Fabaceae. It is native to the Mediterranean and the Middle East.

== Description ==
Astragalus boeticus has a self-supporting growth form and compound, broad leaves.

It can grow to 0.6 meters (2 feet). The bloom period is between the months of July to August. The plant has both male and female organs. It can fix nitrogen. It is pollinated by bees, moths, and butterflies.

It is most commonly found in March and April. It is most commonly found in Spain, being found more than 500 times there.

== Distribution ==
Astragalus boeticus is native to North Africa, southern Europe (including France) and Western Asia to Iran. It is an introduced species in northern Europe.

== Uses ==
The seed pods are edible. Roasted seeds are used as a substitute of coffee.

It has been used as a coffee substitute, especially during the 1800s, when coffee was scarce. It was even used by the Swedish monarchy. There is evidence that Astragalus boeticus has a lot of genetic diversity, as it is found in most of the Mediterranean and parts of the Middle East. Evidence suggests with limited breeding that it could be a better coffee substitute.

== Sources ==
This article incorporates text from a free content work. Licensed under CC0 (license statement/permission). Text taken from Astragalus boeticus. Encyclopedia of Life.
