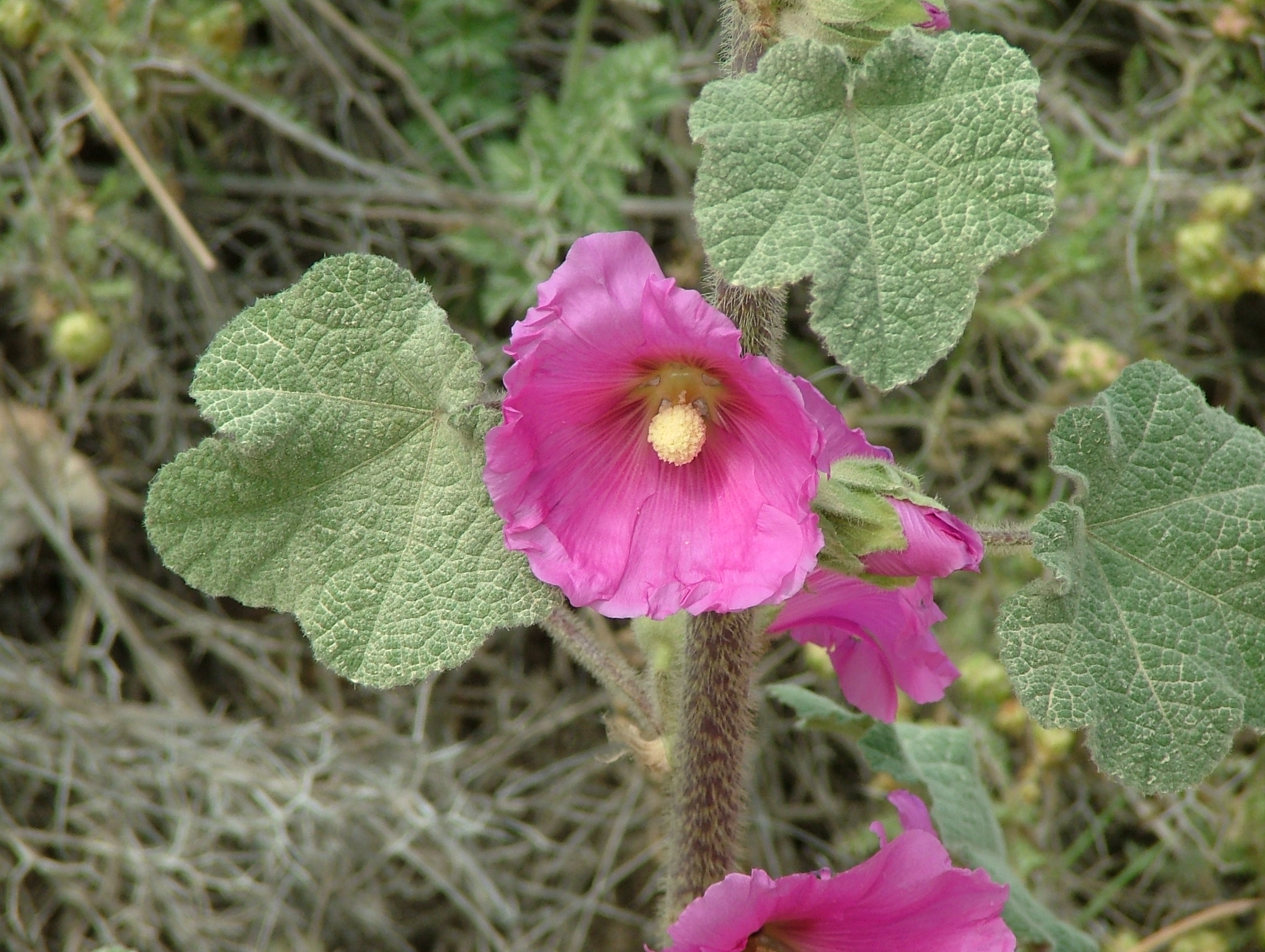

Scientific classification
- Kingdom: Plantae
- Clade: Embryophytes
- Clade: Tracheophytes
- Clade: Angiosperms
- Clade: Eudicots
- Clade: Rosids
- Order: Malvales
- Family: Malvaceae
- Genus: Alcea
- Species: A. setosa

Binomial name
- Alcea setosa (Boiss.) Alef.

Synonyms
- Alcea pontica Janka; Althaea aegyptica Boiss.; Althaea pontica (Janka) Baker f.; Althaea setosa Boiss.

= Alcea setosa =

Species of flowering plant

Alcea setosa, the bristly hollyhock, is an ornamental plant in the family Malvaceae.

The bristly hollyhock is native to the Levant: ranging from Crete, Turkey, Lebanon and Syria to Israel and Jordan. The part above ground of the plant withers and dies in the summer. In the winter, a rosette of leaves develops and a vertical flowering stem grows out of it. The pink flowers are numerous and large, while in the Galilee and the Carmel the flowers are darker and in the Gilboa and Samaria the flowers are lighter. In the Mount Lebanon, flowers ranging from dark pink to white can be found. The whole plant is bristly, hence its common name. The plant flowers from April until June.

In folk medicine, the liquid of the plant is used to treat injuries, burns, coughs and inflammation. The flower buds are edible, cooked and raw, and are considered as medicine for sicknesses in the airways. In Lebanese villages, Bristly hollyhock flowers are dried in the sun, then mixed with other herbs and wild flowers, prepared as concoctions, and served as tea drinks.

== Gallery ==
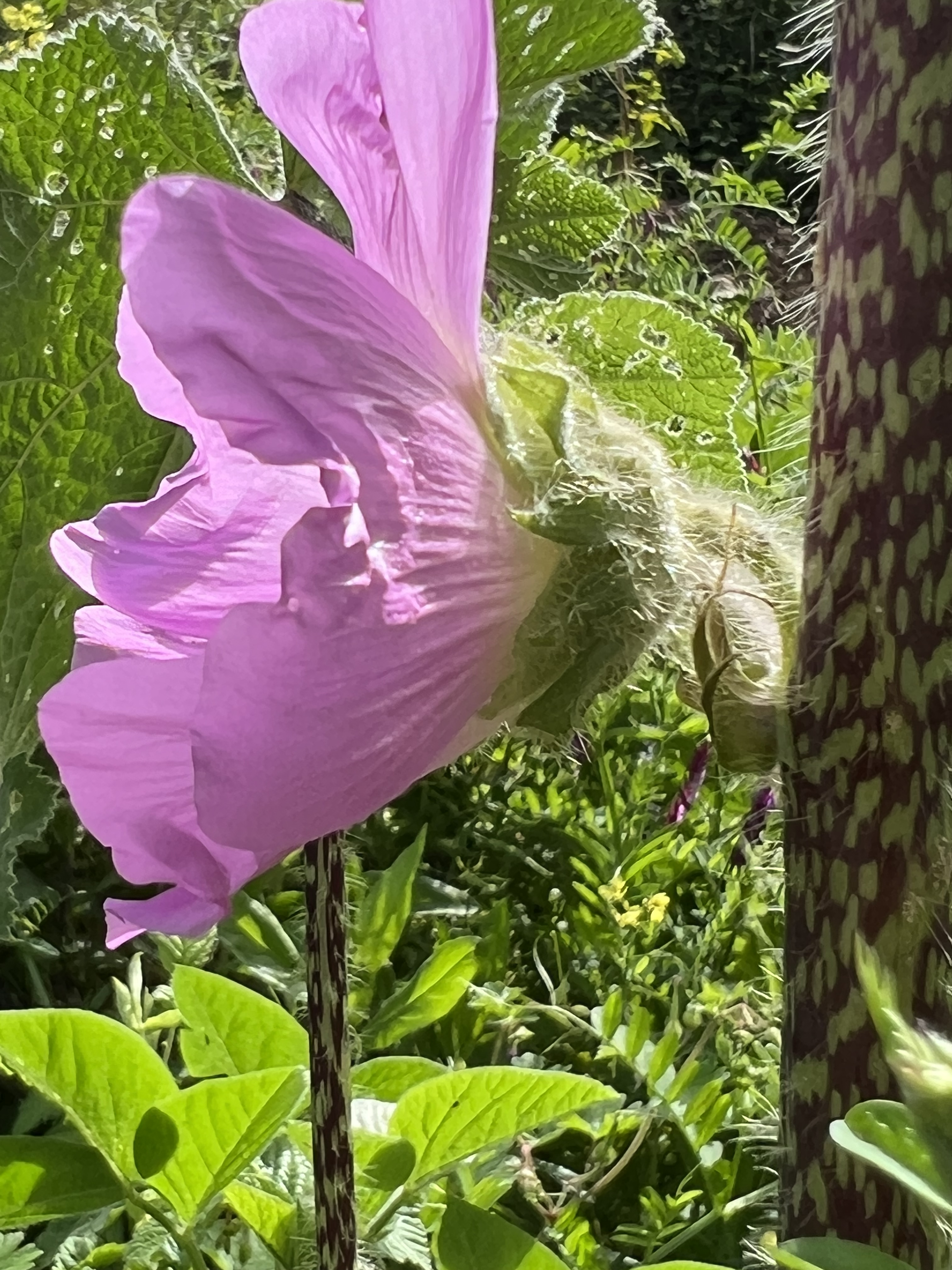
Showing stem with simple coarse hairs, flower calyx with hairs and large epicalyx

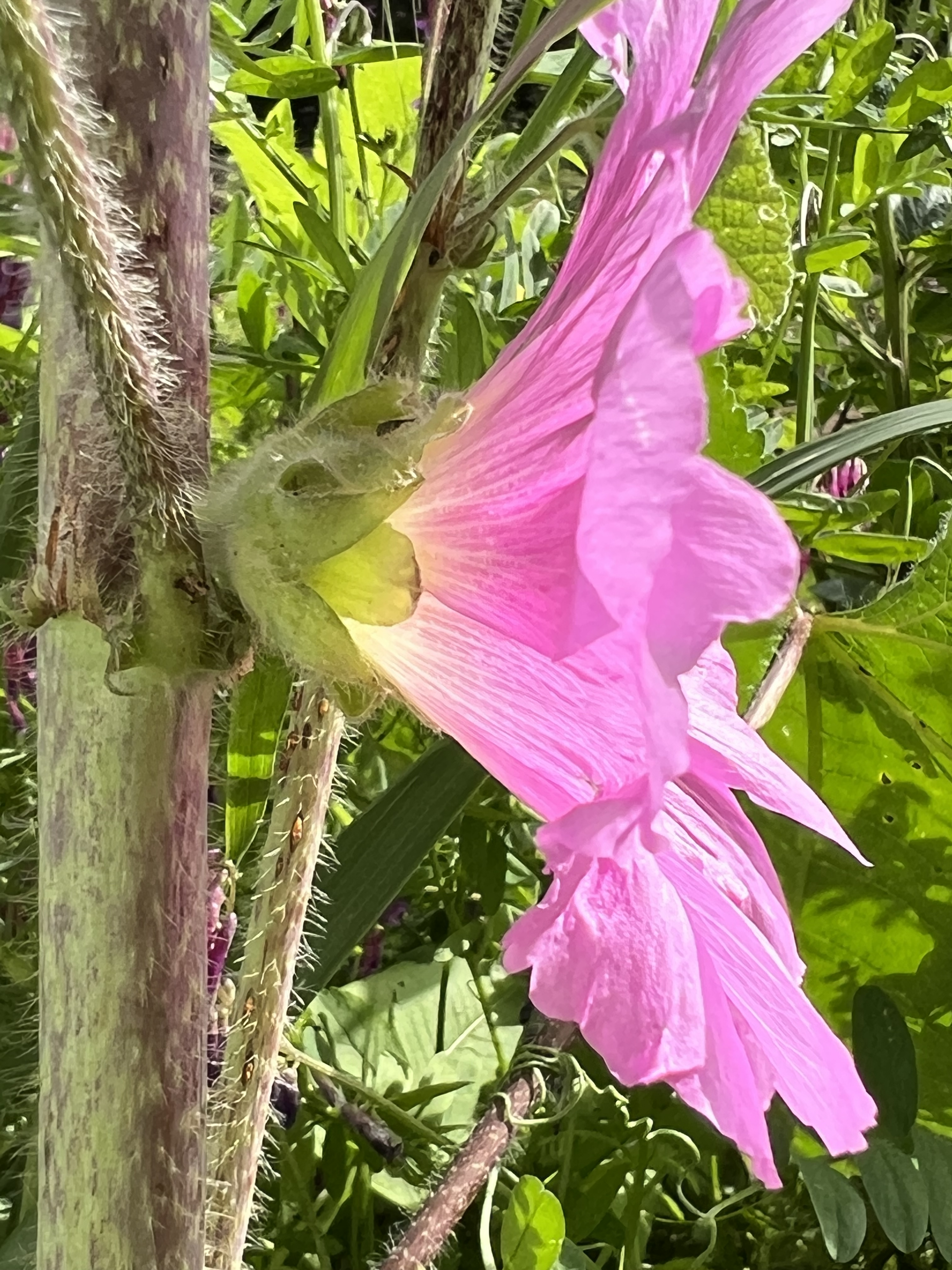
Similar, but stem sparsely haired

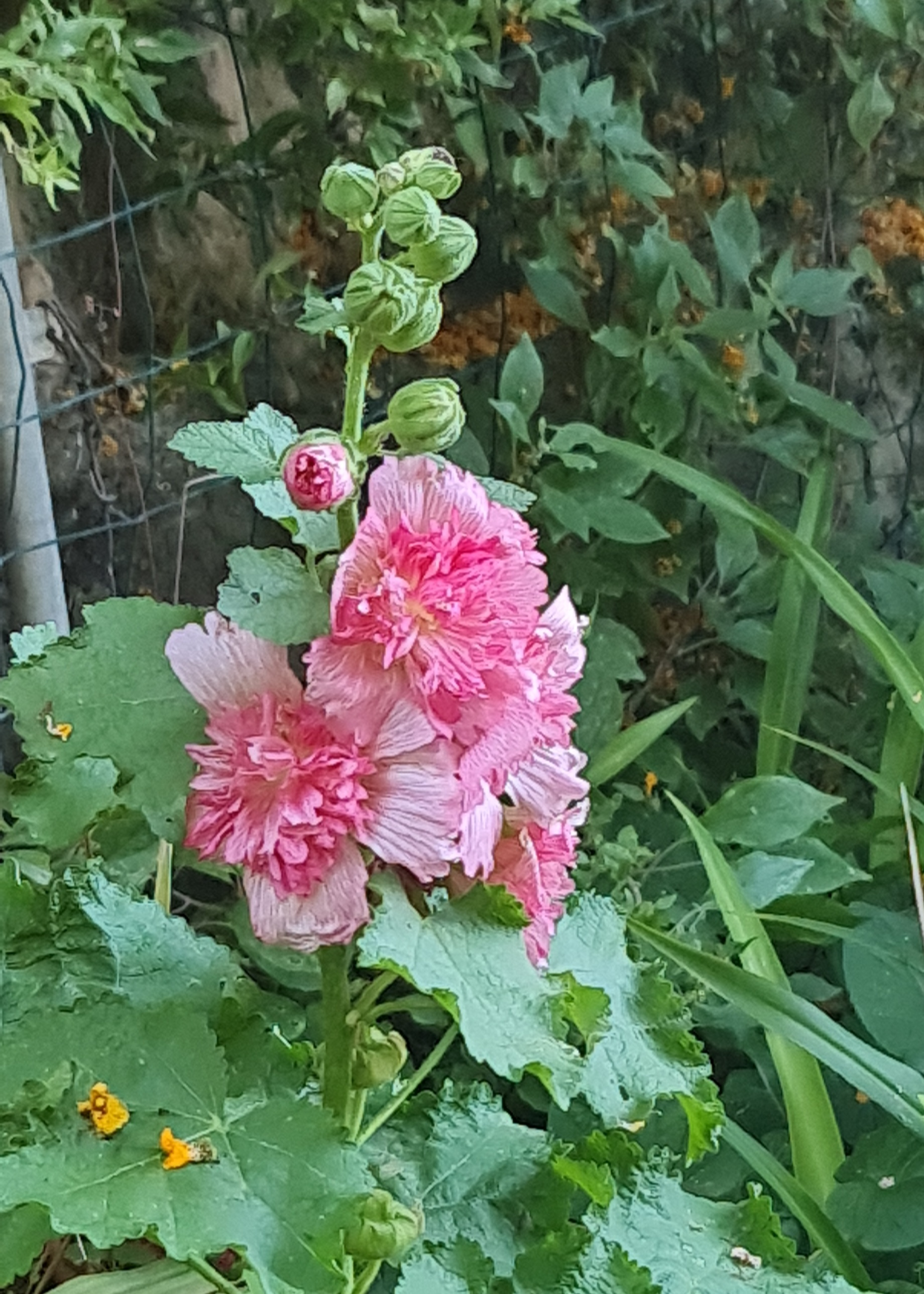

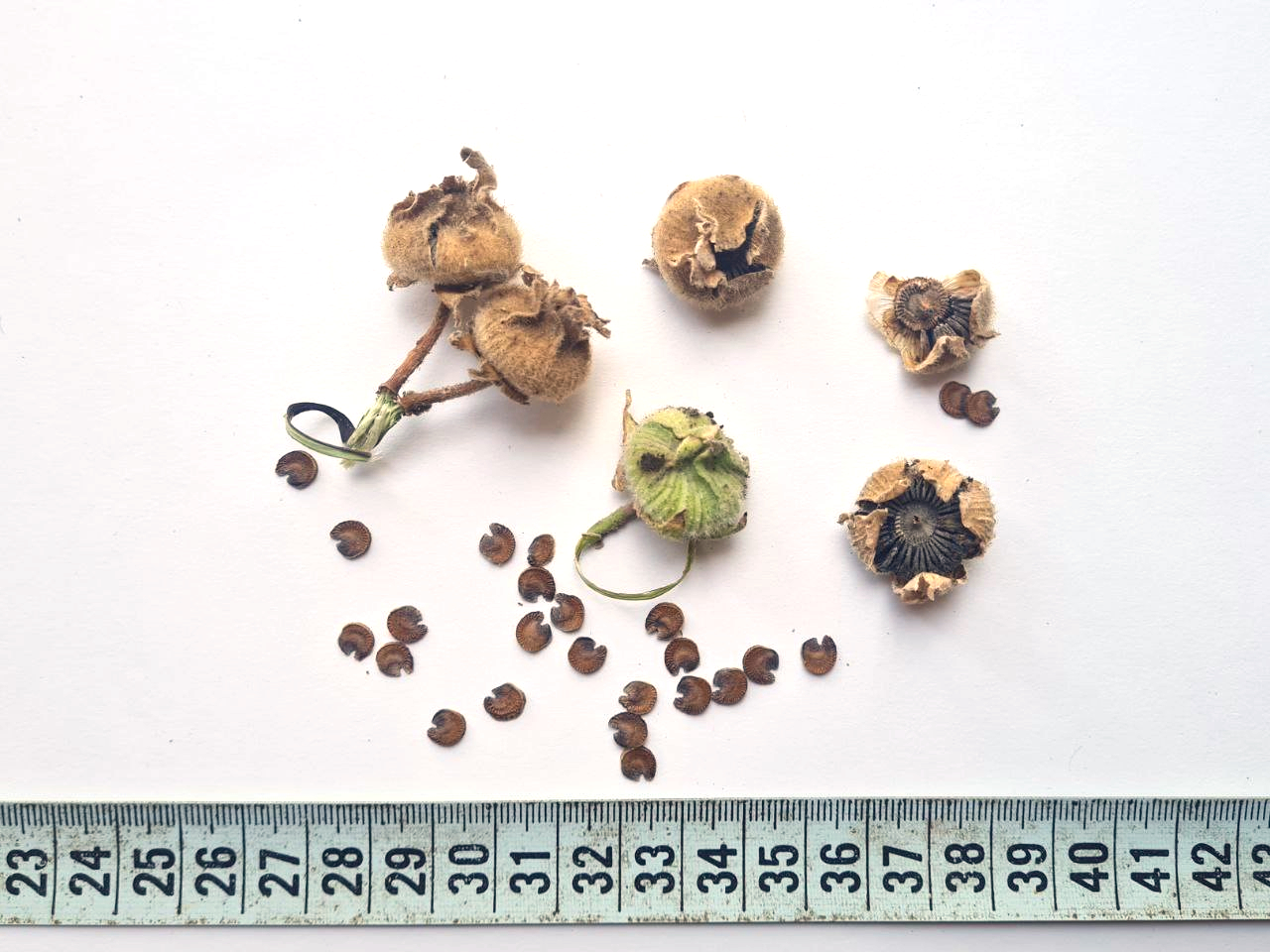
Fruits and seeds of Alcea setosa
