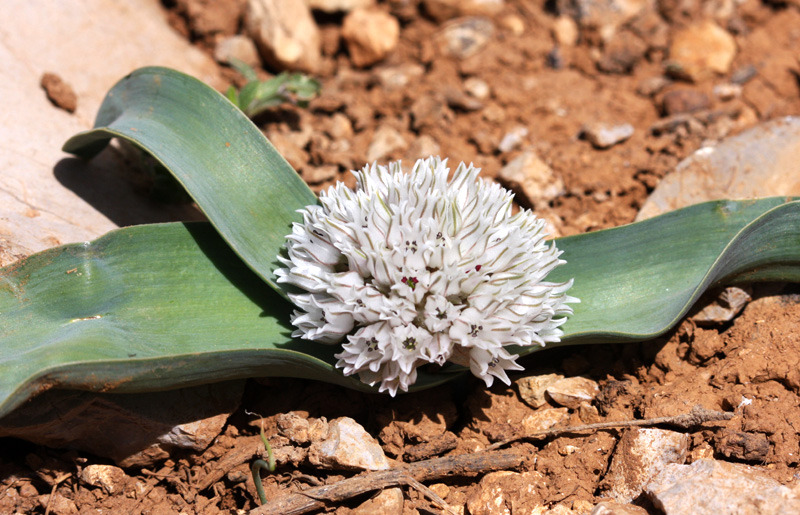

Conservation status
- Near Threatened (IUCN 3.1)

Scientific classification
- Kingdom: Plantae
- Clade: Embryophytes
- Clade: Tracheophytes
- Clade: Spermatophytes
- Clade: Angiosperms
- Clade: Monocots
- Order: Asparagales
- Family: Amaryllidaceae
- Subfamily: Allioideae
- Genus: Allium
- Subgenus: Allium subg. Melanocrommyum
- Species: A. libani

Binomial name
- Allium libani Boiss.

= Allium libani =

Lebanese garlic

Species of flowering plant

Allium libani (Lebanese garlic ثوم لبناني ) is a species of wild bulbous plant geophyte of the genus Allium, belonging to the family of Amaryllidaceae. Allium libani is endemic to the Middle East in Lebanon and Syria.

== Taxonomy ==
Allium libani was described by Pierre Edmond Boissier and published in Diagnoses plantarum orientalium novarum 13: 26, in 1854.

== Etymology ==
Allium
old generic name. The plants of this genus were known by both the Romans and the Greeks . However, it seems that the term has an origin in Celtic which means "to burn", referring to the strong pungent smell of the plant. One of the first to use this name for botanical purposes was the French naturalist Joseph Pitton de Tournefort (1656 - 1708).
libani
epithet, refers to its geographic location in Lebanon.

== Description ==
Allium libani is deciduous. The simple leaves are basal. They are broadly linear with entire margins and parallel venation. The scape characteristic of the family is very short, so the umbel appears to be formed at ground level. The flowers of Allium libani are white. Fruits are loculicidal capsules.

== Cultivation ==
The plants prefer a sunny situation on dry to moderately moist soil. The substrate should be sandy-loamy, gritty-loamy or sandy clay soil. They tolerate temperatures down to −7 °C.
