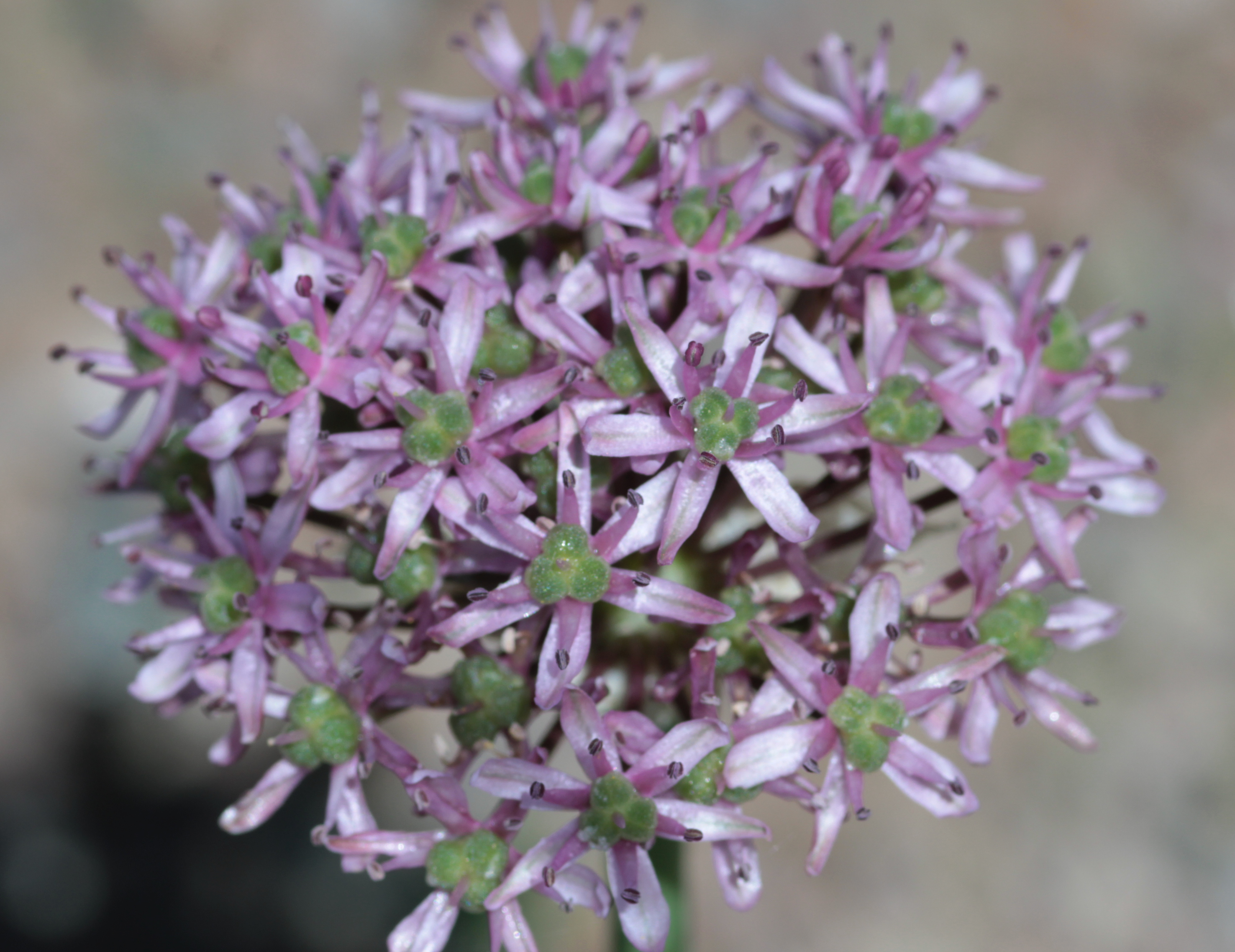
- Allium tel-avivense at the Freiburg Botanical Garden

Scientific classification
- Kingdom: Plantae
- Clade: Tracheophytes
- Clade: Angiosperms
- Clade: Monocots
- Order: Asparagales
- Family: Amaryllidaceae
- Subfamily: Allioideae
- Genus: Allium
- Subgenus: Allium subg. Melanocrommyum
- Species: A. tel-avivense

Binomial name
- Allium tel-avivense Eig

Synonyms
- Allium aschersonianum subsp. tel-avivense (Eig) Oppenh.

= Allium tel-avivense =

Species of plant

Allium tel-avivense is a plant species found in Israel, Palestine, Jordan and Egypt, including the Sinai Peninsula. It is a bulb-forming perennial with a small umbel of only a few flowers. Tepals are pink, and the ovary is large, green and conspicuous. Its name comes from the city of Tel Aviv.
