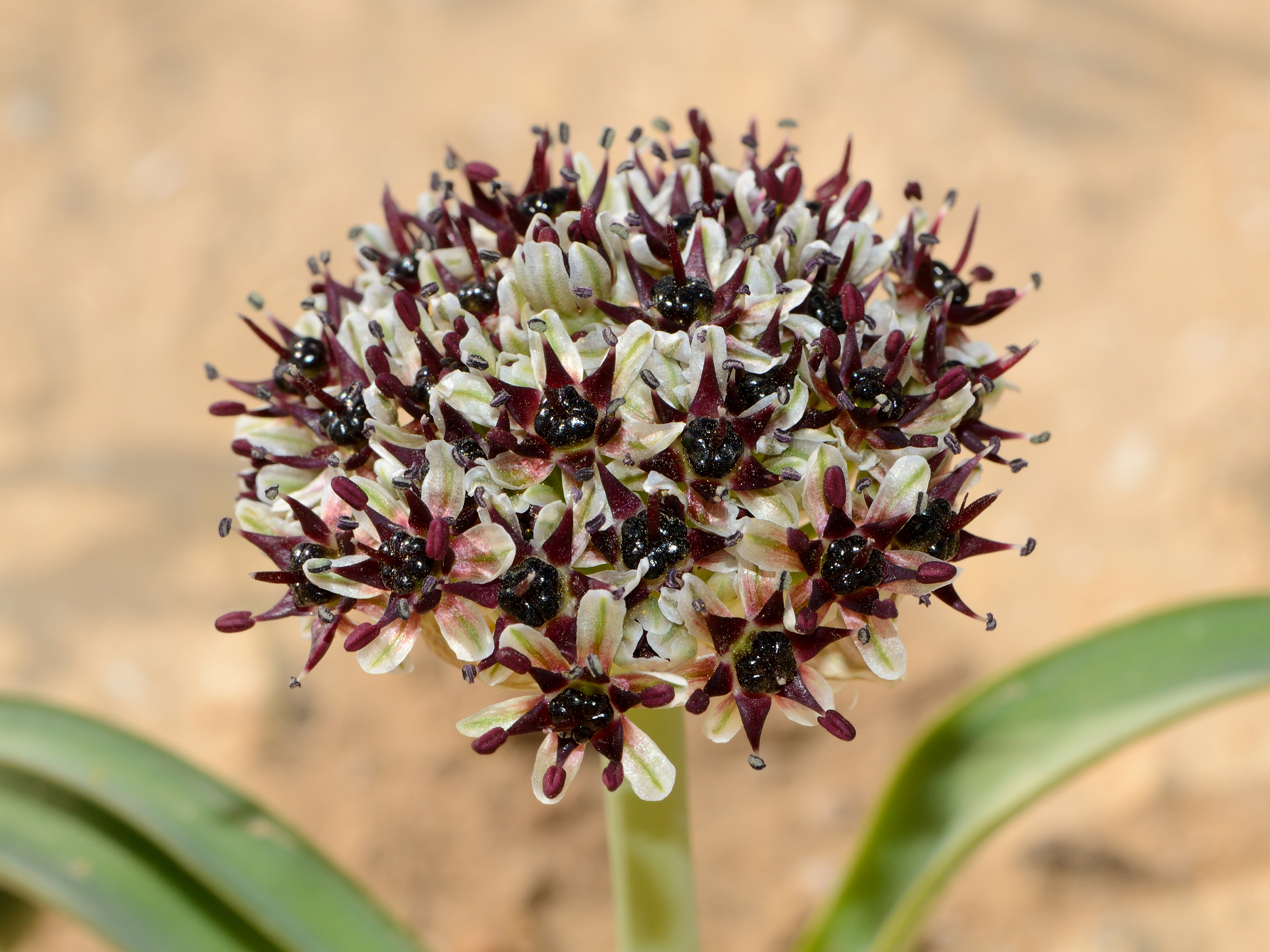

Scientific classification
- Kingdom: Plantae
- Clade: Embryophytes
- Clade: Tracheophytes
- Clade: Spermatophytes
- Clade: Angiosperms
- Clade: Monocots
- Order: Asparagales
- Family: Amaryllidaceae
- Subfamily: Allioideae
- Genus: Allium
- Subgenus: Allium subg. Melanocrommyum
- Species: A. rothii

Binomial name
- Allium rothii Zucc.

= Allium rothii =

Species of flowering plant

Allium rothii Zucc is a plant species found in Israel, Palestine, Syria, Egypt, and Jordan. It is a perennial with umbel-shaped flowers that forms bulbs. Stamens and ovaries are noticeably deep purple, and the tepals are white with deep purple midveins. This name is reported by Amaryllidaceae as an accepted name in the genus Allium (family Amaryllidaceae)."[Pictures taken by]": Gideon Pisanty "[can be found here]" Gideon "Gidi" Pisanty is a photographer and researcher from Israel.

The record derives from WCSP (data supplied on 2023-11-24) which reports it as an accepted name
