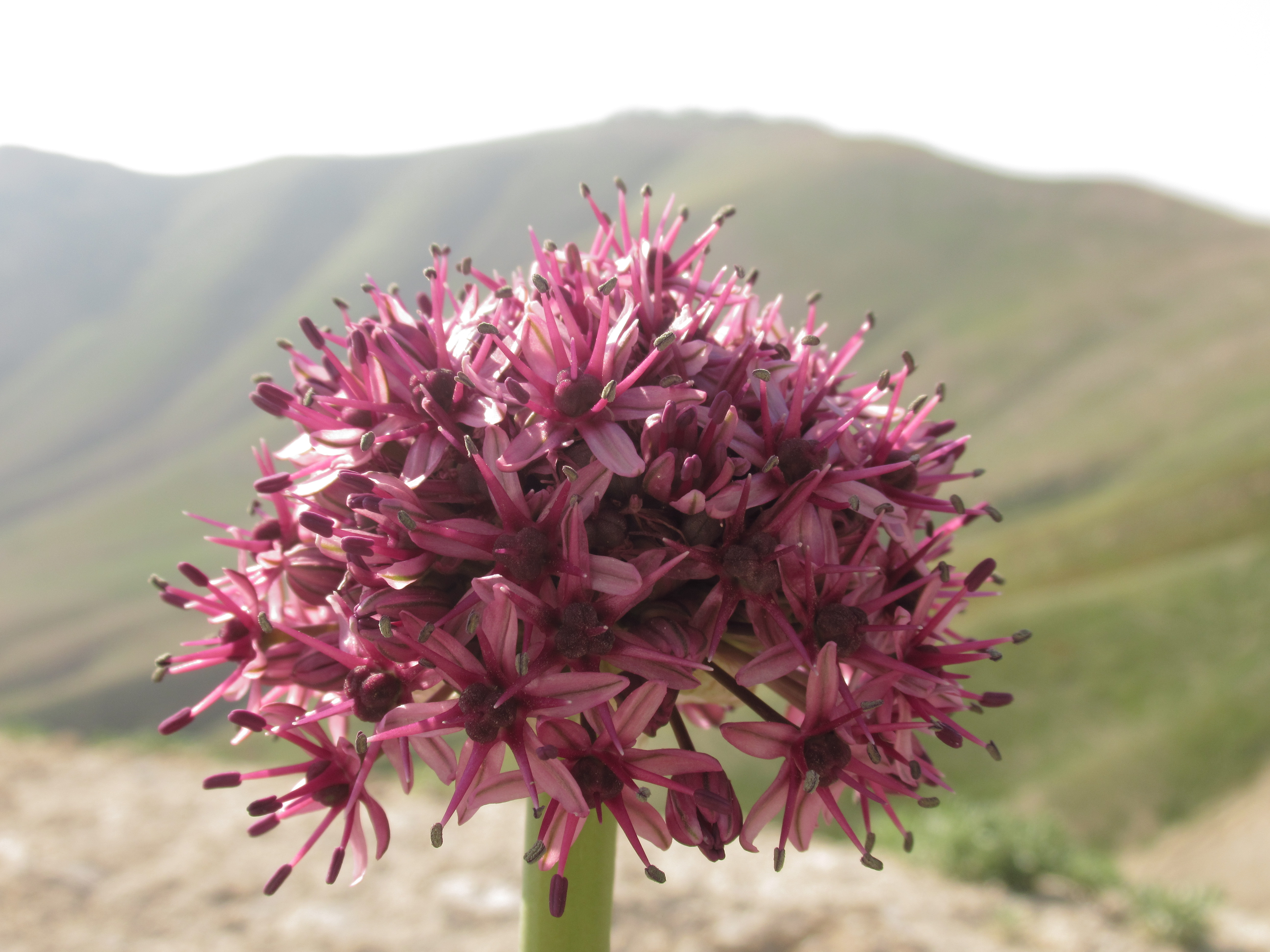
- Close-up of flowers

Scientific classification
- Kingdom: Plantae
- Clade: Tracheophytes
- Clade: Angiosperms
- Clade: Monocots
- Order: Asparagales
- Family: Amaryllidaceae
- Subfamily: Allioideae
- Genus: Allium
- Subgenus: Allium subg. Melanocrommyum
- Species: A. aschersonianum

Binomial name
- Allium aschersonianum Barbey

Synonyms
- Allium aschersonianum f. genuinum Pamp.; Allium eximium Nyár.

= Allium aschersonianum =

Species of plant

Allium aschersonianum, Ascherson's garlic, is a species of flowering plant in the family Amaryllidaceae, native to southern Turkey, Israel, and northeastern Libya. A perennial typically reaching 60 cm (24 in), the Royal Horticultural Society considers it a good plant to attract pollinators, and it is occasionally available from commercial suppliers. It is cultivated for the cut flower industry in Israel.
