= Allium decaisnei =

Scientific classification
- Kingdom: Plantae
- Clade: Tracheophytes
- Clade: Angiosperms
- Clade: Monocots
- Order: Asparagales
- Family: Amaryllidaceae
- Subfamily: Allioideae
- Genus: Allium
- Species: A. decaisnei

Binomial name
- Allium decaisnei C.Presl

Synonyms
- Allium stamineum subsp. decaisnei (C.Presl) Kollmann

Species of plant

Allium decaisnei is a species of onion found in Israel, Palestine, Jordan, and the Sinai Peninsula in Egypt. It is a perennial with an upright scape. Umbel is loose, with long-pediceled green flowers, most of them nodding (drooping).

Some authorities categorize this taxon as a subspecies of A. stamineum, with others consider the name a synonym of A. flavum.
