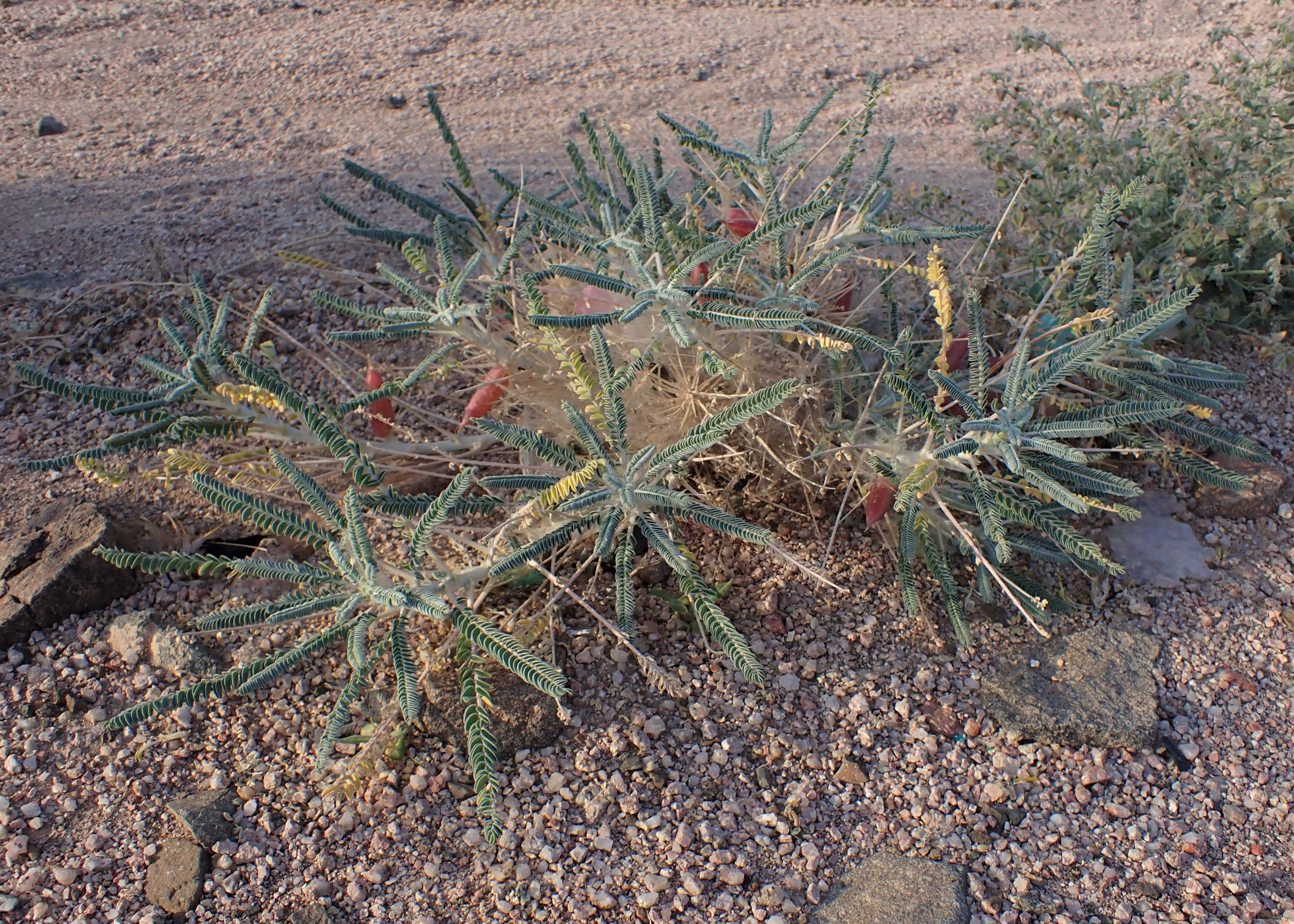

Scientific classification
- Kingdom: Plantae
- Clade: Tracheophytes
- Clade: Angiosperms
- Clade: Eudicots
- Clade: Rosids
- Order: Fabales
- Family: Fabaceae
- Subfamily: Faboideae
- Genus: Astragalus
- Species: A. dactylocarpus

Binomial name
- Astragalus dactylocarpus Boiss.

Synonyms
- Tragacantha dactylocarpa (Boiss.) Kuntze

= Astragalus dactylocarpus =

Species of flowering plant

Astragalus dactylocarpus is a species of milkvetch in the family Fabaceae. It is native to the Middle East and Central Asia.

== Description ==
The petal color is yellow. The flowers are only hermaphrodites. The sporangia are homogeneous seeds-fruits. The alternate leaves are one leaf per node. The leaf margin is smooth. The stipules are there. It is most commonly found in the months of March, April, and May. It flowers in the months of January, February, and March.

The species has two accepted subspecies:

- Astragalus dactylocarpus subsp. acinacifer
- Astragalus dactylocarpus subsp. dactylocarpus

== Distribution and habitat ==
The flower lives in the desert, with Thermophilous plants. The plant is a glycophyte, which is a salt tolerant plant.
