= Allium papillare =

Scientific classification
- Kingdom: Plantae
- Clade: Tracheophytes
- Clade: Angiosperms
- Clade: Monocots
- Order: Asparagales
- Family: Amaryllidaceae
- Subfamily: Allioideae
- Genus: Allium
- Species: A. papillare

Binomial name
- Allium papillare Boiss.

Species of plant

Allium papillare is a species of flowering plant in the Amaryllidaceae family. It is a wild onion found in sandy areas in southern and eastern Israel and the Sinai Peninsula of Egypt. It is a small bulb-forming perennial; flowers have white tepals with purple midveins.
