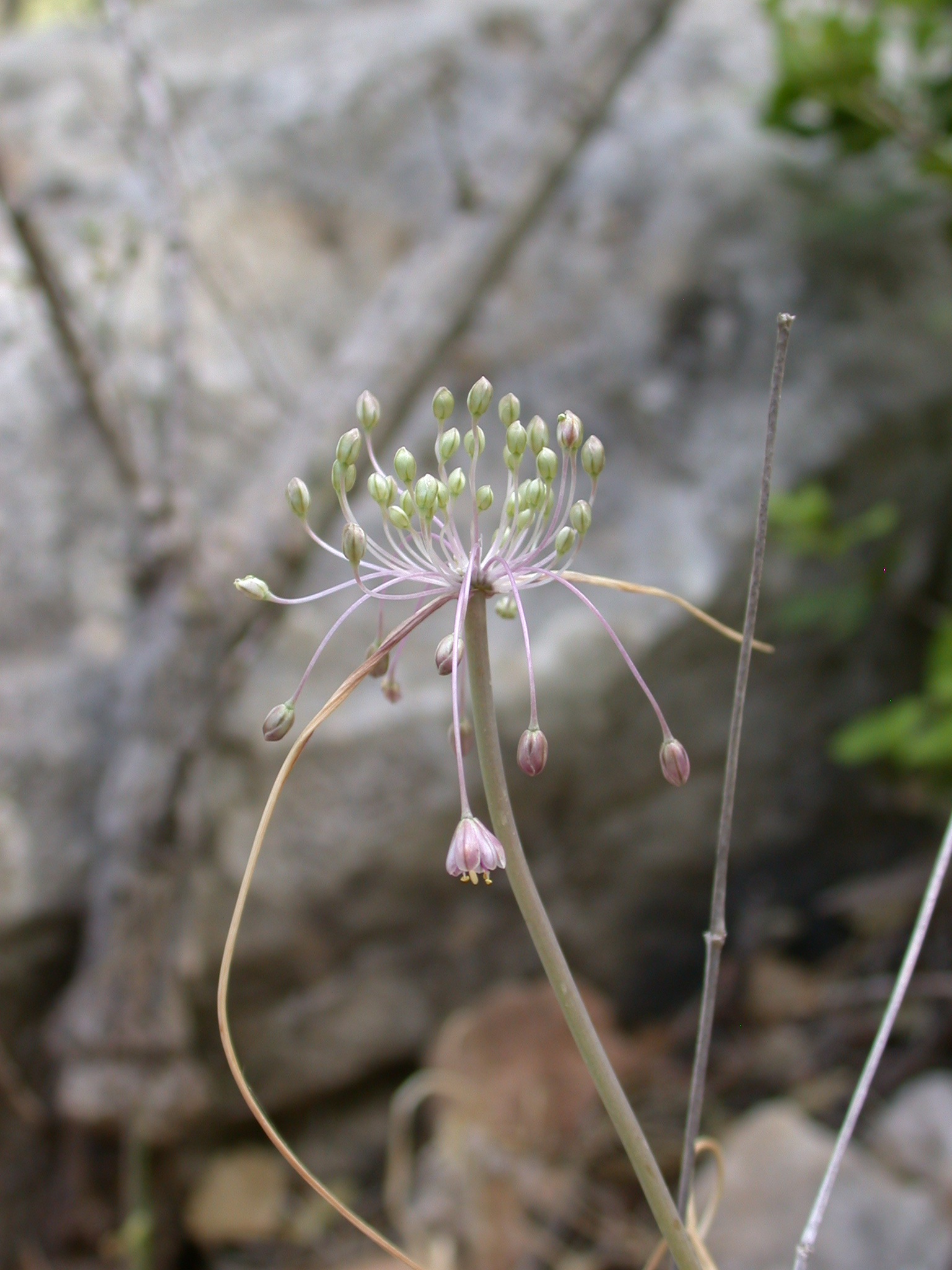

Scientific classification
- Kingdom: Plantae
- Clade: Tracheophytes
- Clade: Angiosperms
- Clade: Monocots
- Order: Asparagales
- Family: Amaryllidaceae
- Subfamily: Allioideae
- Genus: Allium
- Species: A. daninianum

Binomial name
- Allium daninianum Brullo, Pavone & Salmeri

= Allium daninianum =

Species of flowering plant

Allium daninianum is a species of onion found in the Levant; Israel, Syria, Lebanon, Palestine and Jordan. It is a bulb-forming perennial with a long, flexuous scape. Umbel is lax, the pink flowers long-pedicelled and mostly drooping.
