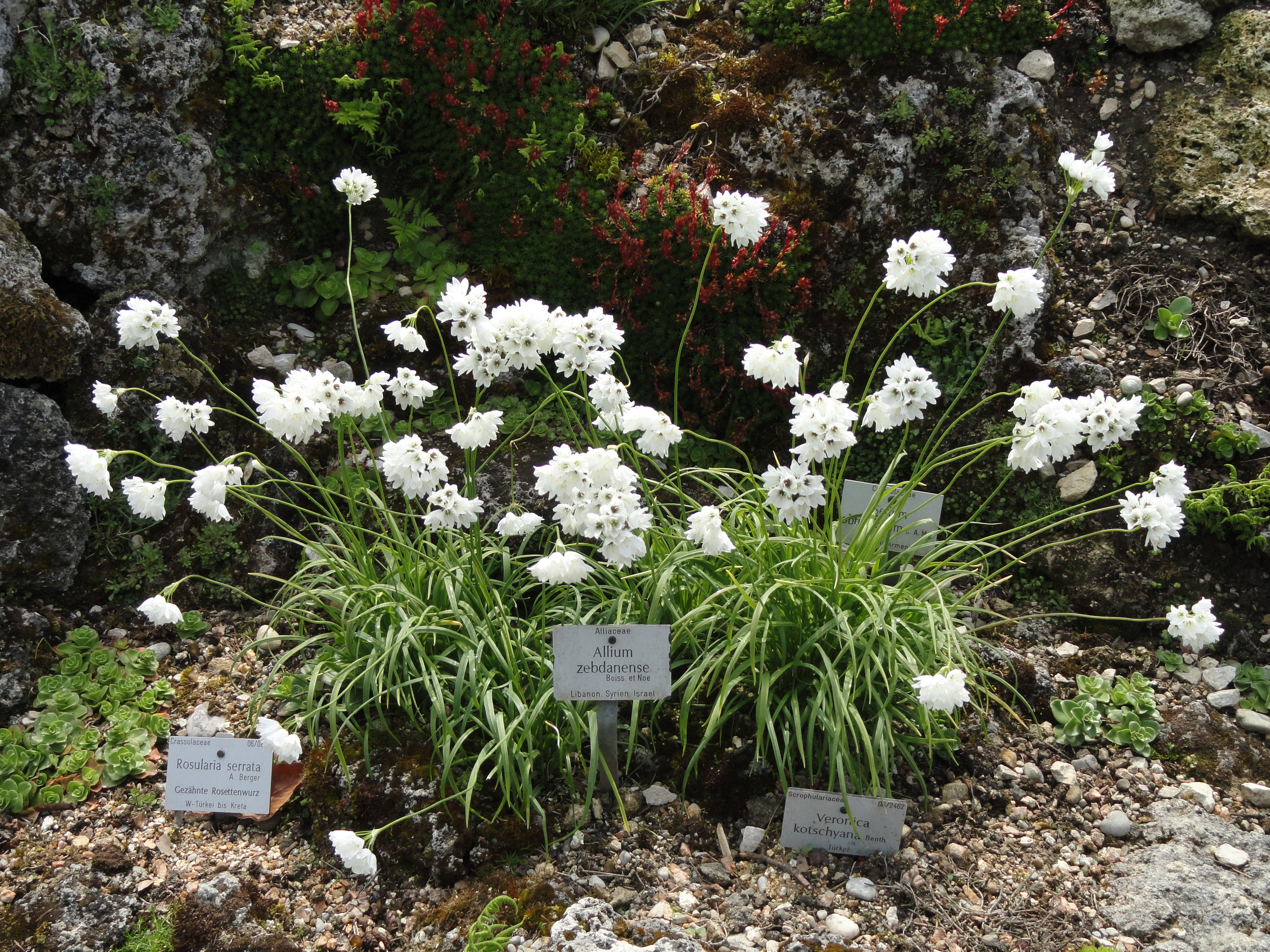

Scientific classification
- Kingdom: Plantae
- Clade: Embryophytes
- Clade: Tracheophytes
- Clade: Spermatophytes
- Clade: Angiosperms
- Clade: Monocots
- Order: Asparagales
- Family: Amaryllidaceae
- Subfamily: Allioideae
- Genus: Allium
- Subgenus: A. subg. Amerallium
- Species: A. zebdanense

Binomial name
- Allium zebdanense Boiss. & Noë

Synonyms
- Allium chionanthum Boiss.

= Allium zebdanense =

Species of flowering plant

Allium zebdanense is a Middle Eastern species of wild onion found in Israel, Palestine, Syria, Lebanon, Turkey, Caucasus and Jordan. It is a bulb-forming perennial with an umbel of cream-colored flowers.
