= Allium sinaiticum =

Scientific classification
- Kingdom: Plantae
- Clade: Embryophytes
- Clade: Tracheophytes
- Clade: Spermatophytes
- Clade: Angiosperms
- Clade: Monocots
- Order: Asparagales
- Family: Amaryllidaceae
- Subfamily: Allioideae
- Genus: Allium
- Species: A. sinaiticum

Binomial name
- Allium sinaiticum Boiss.

Species of flowering plant

Allium sinaiticum is a species of flowering plant in the Amaryllidaceae family. It is a wild onion found in sandy areas in Israel, Sinai, Palestine, Jordan and Saudi Arabia. It is a small, bulb-forming perennial; flowers have white tepals with green midveins.
