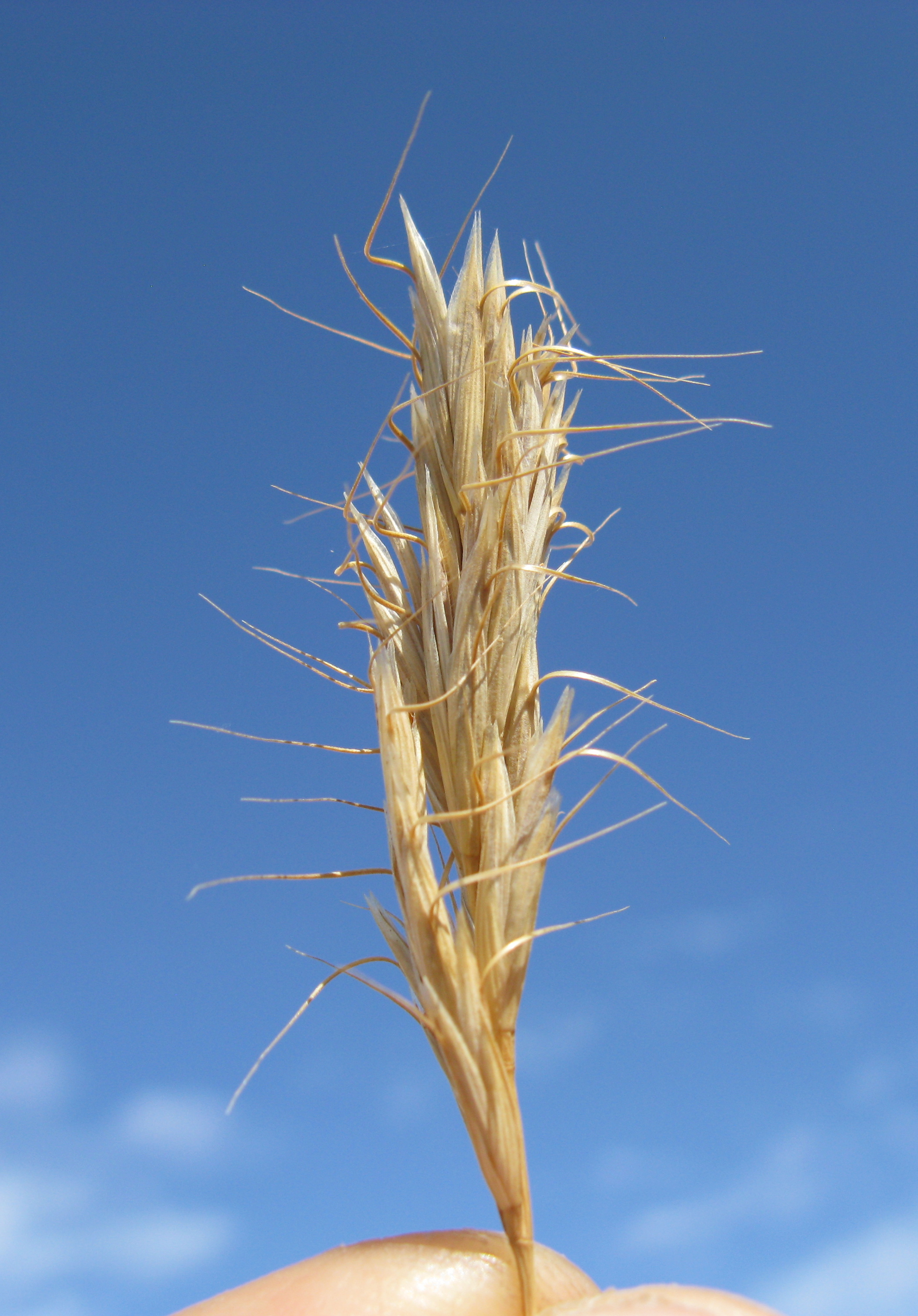

Scientific classification
- Kingdom: Plantae
- Clade: Embryophytes
- Clade: Tracheophytes
- Clade: Angiosperms
- Clade: Monocots
- Clade: Commelinids
- Order: Poales
- Family: Poaceae
- Subfamily: Pooideae
- Genus: Bromus
- Species: B. alopecuros

Binomial name
- Bromus alopecuros Poir.

Synonyms
- List: Bromus contortus Desf.; Bromus alopecurus Pers.; Bromus alopecuroides Poir; Bromus sericeus Ten.; Bromus scoparius Guss.; Serrafalcus contortus (Desf.) Parl.; Serrafalcus alopecuros (Poir.) Parl.; Serrafalcus macrostachys var. minor Godr.; Bromus squarrosus var. contortus (Desf.) Kuntze; Serrafalcus macrostachys var. minor E.G.Camus; Bromus scoparius var. alopecuros (Poir.) Fiori; Bromus alopecuros var. calvus Halácsy; Serrafalcus scoparius var. contortus (Desf.) Lojac.; Bromus alopecuros var. poiretianus Maire & Weiller; Bromus lanceolatus subsp. biaristulatus Maire; Bromus caroli-henrici subsp. biaristulatus (Maire) H.Scholz; Bromus alopecuros subsp. biaristulatus (Maire) Acedo & Llamas; Bromus alopecuros subsp. alopecuros

= Bromus alopecuros =

Species of grass

Bromus alopecuros is a species of brome grass known by the common name weedy brome.

It is native to the Mediterranean basin, and it is known in other places, including Australia, South Africa, and California, as an introduced species and sometimes a weed. It is an annual grass producing stems up to 80 centimeters tall. The inflorescence is a dense packet of spikelets with tangling, curved awns.

== Description ==
Bromus alopecuros grows 10–80 cm (3.9–31.5 in) tall, with smooth leaf sheathes and a ligule with hairs on its margins. Its leaves are 5–20 cm (2.0–7.9 in) long and have hairy surfaces. Its inflorescence is an open panicle with stiff branches, growing 6–20 cm (2.4–7.9 in) long. Its spikelets are appressed, and are sessile when fertile. The fertile spikelets are lanceolate or ovate in shape, growing 2.4–4.5 cm (0.94–1.77 in) long. Its glumes are shorter than the spikelets, and both upper and lower glumes are lanceolate. Upper glumes are 11–20 mm (0.43–0.79 in) long and lower glumes are 6–10 mm (0.24–0.39 in) long.

== Distribution and habitat ==
Though Bromus alopecuros is native to the east Mediterranean and northern Africa, it is introduced in many subtropical areas, including California, New South Wales, Queensland, and Tasmania.
