= Allium trachycoleum =

Scientific classification
- Kingdom: Plantae
- Clade: Tracheophytes
- Clade: Angiosperms
- Clade: Monocots
- Order: Asparagales
- Family: Amaryllidaceae
- Subfamily: Allioideae
- Genus: Allium
- Species: A. trachycoleum

Binomial name
- Allium trachycoleum Wendelbo

Species of flowering plant

Allium trachycoleum is a Middle Eastern species of wild onion found in Israel, Palestine, Lebanon, Syria, Jordan, Turkey, and Iraq. It is a bulb-forming perennial up to 70 cm tall, with an umbel of white and green flowers.
