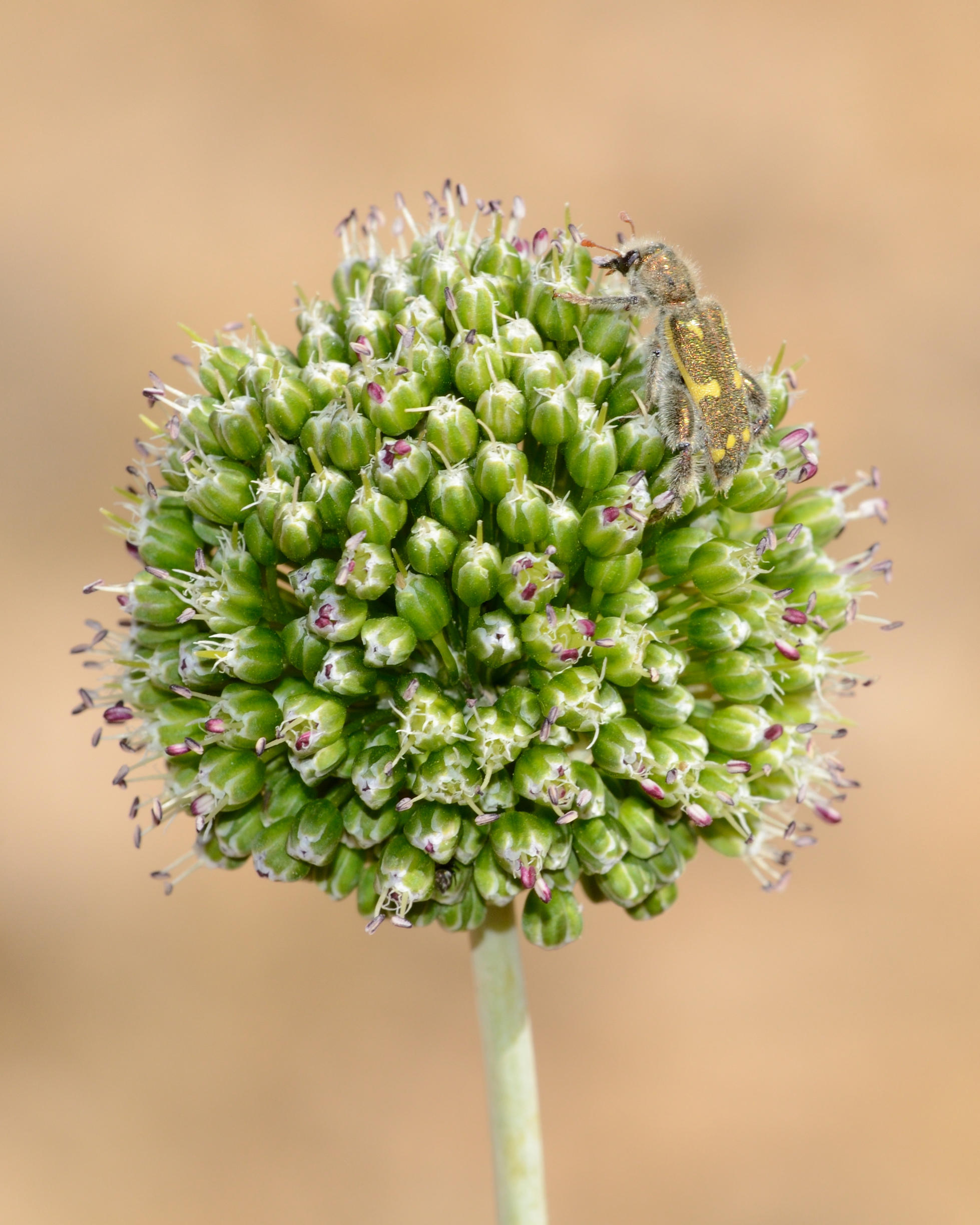

Scientific classification
- Kingdom: Plantae
- Clade: Tracheophytes
- Clade: Angiosperms
- Clade: Monocots
- Order: Asparagales
- Family: Amaryllidaceae
- Subfamily: Allioideae
- Genus: Allium
- Subgenus: A. subg. Allium
- Species: A. dictyoprasum

Binomial name
- Allium dictyoprasum C.A.Mey. ex Kunth

Synonyms
- Allium emarginatum Rech.f.; Allium multiflorum var. violaceopurpureum K.Koch; Allium viride Grossh.

= Allium dictyoprasum =

Species of flowering plant

Allium dictyoprasum is a Southwest Asian species of onion in the amaryllis family, found in Israel, Palestine, Lebanon, Turkey, Caucasus, Iran, Iraq, Turkmenistan and Saudi Arabia. It is a bulb-forming perennial producing a tight umbel of white, yellow or green flowers.
