= Bromus intermedius =

Scientific classification
- Kingdom: Plantae
- Clade: Tracheophytes
- Clade: Angiosperms
- Clade: Monocots
- Clade: Commelinids
- Order: Poales
- Family: Poaceae
- Subfamily: Pooideae
- Genus: Bromus
- Species: B. intermedius

Binomial name
- Bromus intermedius Guss.

Synonyms
- List: Avena lasiantha Link; Bromus alopecuroides Moris ex Steud.; Bromus hordeaceus var. intermedius (Guss.) Shear; Bromus hughii Tod. ex Nyman; Bromus lanceolatus subsp. intermedius (Guss.) Lloret; Bromus optimae H.Scholz; Bromus requienii Loisel.; Serrafalcus hughii Tod.; Serrafalcus intermedius (Guss.) Parl.

Species of grass

Bromus intermedius, the intermediate brome, is a species of flowering plant in the family Poaceae. It is native to the Mediterranean countries and islands, and eastwards to Afghanistan. It can be found growing on serpentine soils.
