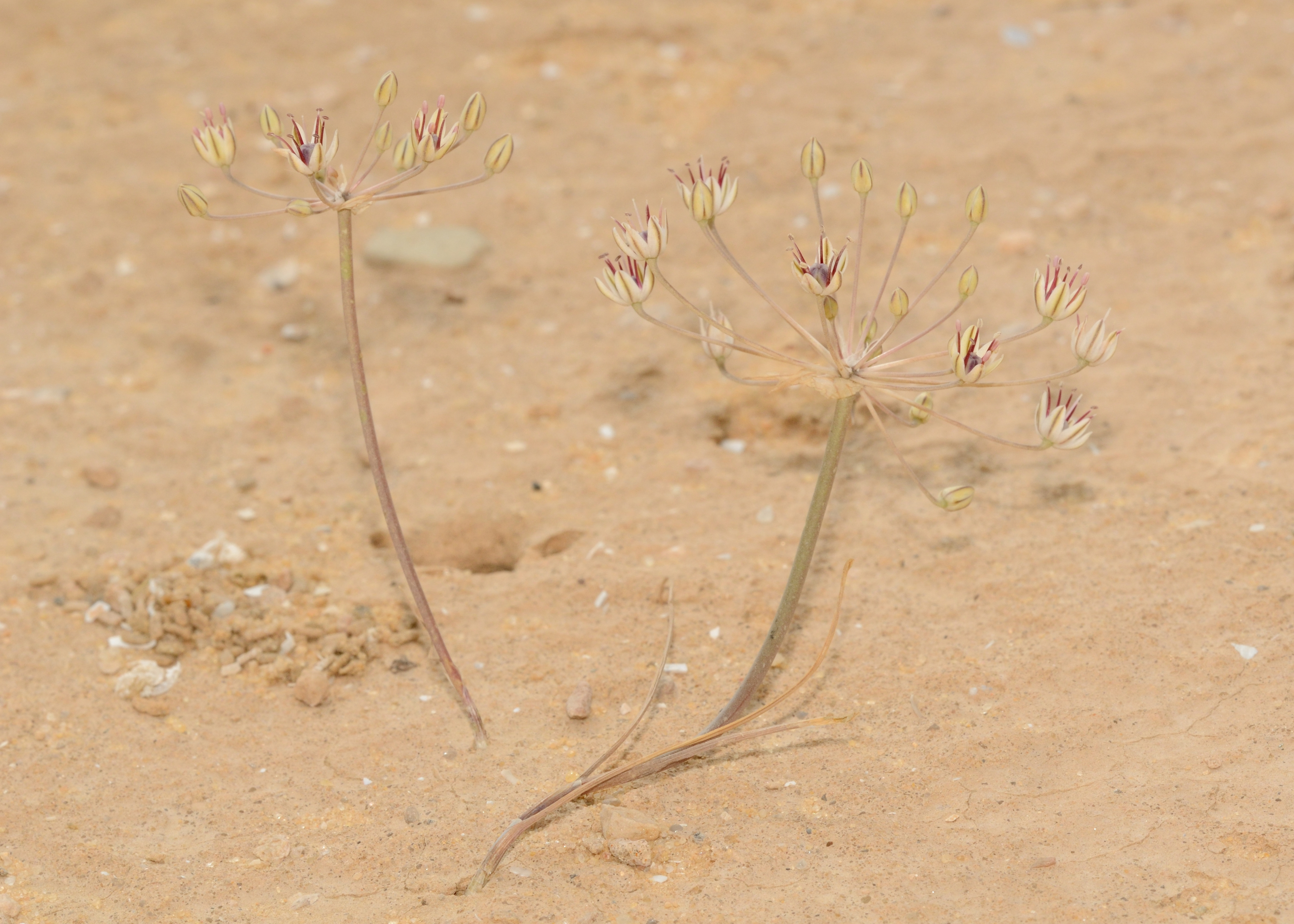

Scientific classification
- Kingdom: Plantae
- Clade: Embryophytes
- Clade: Tracheophytes
- Clade: Spermatophytes
- Clade: Angiosperms
- Clade: Monocots
- Order: Asparagales
- Family: Amaryllidaceae
- Subfamily: Allioideae
- Genus: Allium
- Species: A. sindjarense

Binomial name
- Allium sindjarense Boiss. & Hausskn. ex Regel

= Allium sindjarense =

Species of flowering plant

Allium sindjarense is a species of flowering plant in the Amaryllidaceae family.

is a Middle Eastern species of wild onion found in Iraq, Kuwait, Lebanon, israel, Saudi Arabia, Syria and Turkey. It is a bulb-forming perennial with an umbel if very tiny white flowers on elongated pedicels.
