= Bromus fasciculatus =

Scientific classification
- Kingdom: Plantae
- Clade: Tracheophytes
- Clade: Angiosperms
- Clade: Monocots
- Clade: Commelinids
- Order: Poales
- Family: Poaceae
- Subfamily: Pooideae
- Genus: Bromus
- Species: B. fasciculatus

Binomial name
- Bromus fasciculatus C.Presl

Synonyms
- Anisantha fasciculata

Species of plant

Bromus fasciculatus is a species of herb in the family Poaceae (true grasses).
