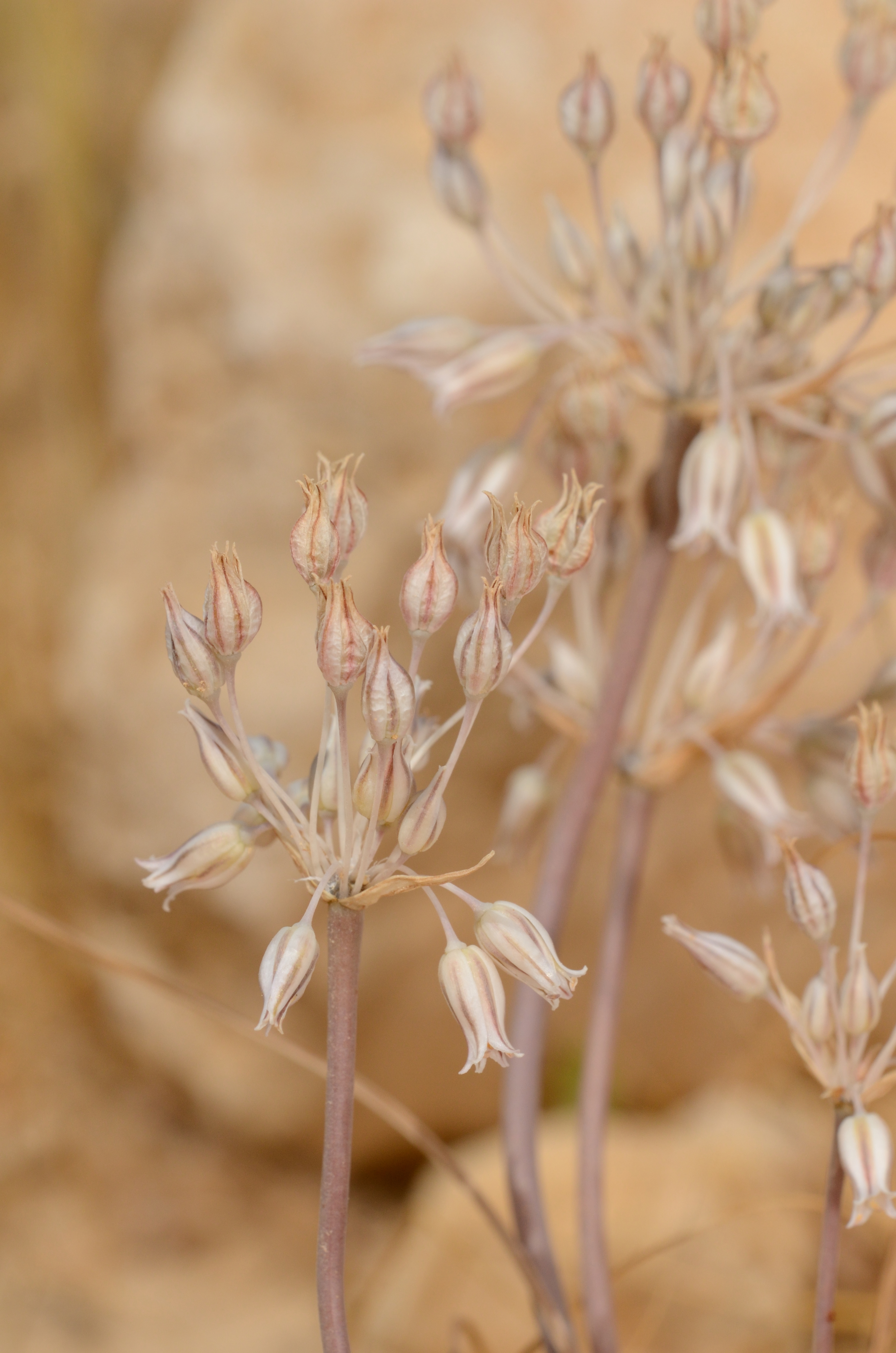

Scientific classification
- Kingdom: Plantae
- Clade: Embryophytes
- Clade: Tracheophytes
- Clade: Spermatophytes
- Clade: Angiosperms
- Clade: Monocots
- Order: Asparagales
- Family: Amaryllidaceae
- Subfamily: Allioideae
- Genus: Allium
- Subgenus: A. subg. Allium
- Species: A. desertorum

Binomial name
- Allium desertorum Forssk.

Synonyms
- Allium modestum Boiss.

= Allium desertorum =

Species of plant

Allium desertorum is a species of onion found in Israel, Jordan, Palestine, and Egypt (including Sinai). It is a small bulb-forming perennial; flowers are white with purple midveins along the tepals.
