= Allium rupicola =

Scientific classification
- Kingdom: Plantae
- Clade: Tracheophytes
- Clade: Angiosperms
- Clade: Monocots
- Order: Asparagales
- Family: Amaryllidaceae
- Subfamily: Allioideae
- Genus: Allium
- Species: A. rupicola

Binomial name
- Allium rupicola Boiss. ex Mouterde

Synonyms
- Allium stamineum var. alpinum Post 1896 not Allium alpinum (DC.) Hegetschw. 1838

Species of plant

Allium rupicola is a species of onion found in Israel, Turkey, Lebanon and Syria. It has a rosette of leaves plus a scape bearing an umbel of pink flowers.
