= Allium platyspathum =

宽苞韭 kuan bao jiu Лук широкочехольный

Scientific classification
- Kingdom: Plantae
- Clade: Embryophytes
- Clade: Tracheophytes
- Clade: Spermatophytes
- Clade: Angiosperms
- Clade: Monocots
- Order: Asparagales
- Family: Amaryllidaceae
- Subfamily: Allioideae
- Genus: Allium
- Subgenus: A. subg. Polyprason
- Species: A. platyspathum

Binomial name
- Allium platyspathum Schrenk ex Fisch. & C.A. Mey.

Synonyms
- Allium amblyophyllum Kar. & Kir.; Allium platyspathum var. majus Ledeb.; Allium alataviense Regel

Species of plant

Allium platyspathum is an Asian species of wild onion. It has been reported from Xinjiang, Afghanistan, Kazakhstan, Kyrgyzstan, Mongolia, Altay Krai, Tajikistan, Uzbekistan, and Pakistan. It grows in damp locations at elevations of 1900–3700 m.

Allium platyspathum usually produces a single egg-shaped bulb up to 20 mm in diameter. Scape is up to 100 cm tall. Leaves are flat, linear, up to 20 mm across, about the same length as the scape. Umbel is a densely packed cluster of pink or lilac flowers.

Varieties

- Allium platyspathum subsp. amblyophyllum (Kar. & Kir.) N.Friesen -- scape 40–100 cm long, flowers pink; leaves 10–20 mm wide - Xinjiang, Afghanistan, Kazakhstan, Kyrgyzstan, Mongolia, Altay Krai
- Allium platyspathum subsp. platyspathum—scape up to 25 cm long; flowers lilac, leaves less than 8 mm wide - Xinjiang, Afghanistan, Kazakhstan, Kyrgyzstan, Mongolia, Altay Krai, Tajikistan, Uzbekistan, Pakistan

formerly included

Allium platyspathum var. falcatum Regel, now called Allium carolinianum Redouté
