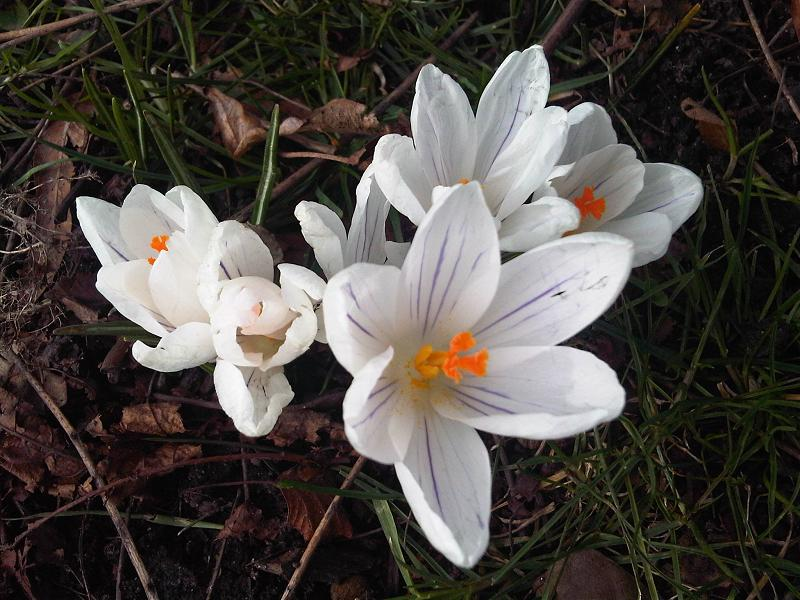

Scientific classification
- Kingdom: Plantae
- Clade: Tracheophytes
- Clade: Angiosperms
- Clade: Monocots
- Order: Asparagales
- Family: Iridaceae
- Genus: Crocus
- Species: C. caspius

Binomial name
- Crocus caspius Fisch. & C.A.Mey. ex Hohen

Synonyms
- Crocus boryanus var. caspius (Fisch. & C.A.Mey. ex Hohen.) Herb.

= Crocus caspius =

Species of flowering plant

Crocus caspius is a species of flowering plant in the family Iridaceae. It is from Southeastern Transcaucasus to Northern Iran.

Its flowers are white and often stippled lilac on outer petals. The plant has membranous corm tunic splits at the base. The flowering season is October and November.
