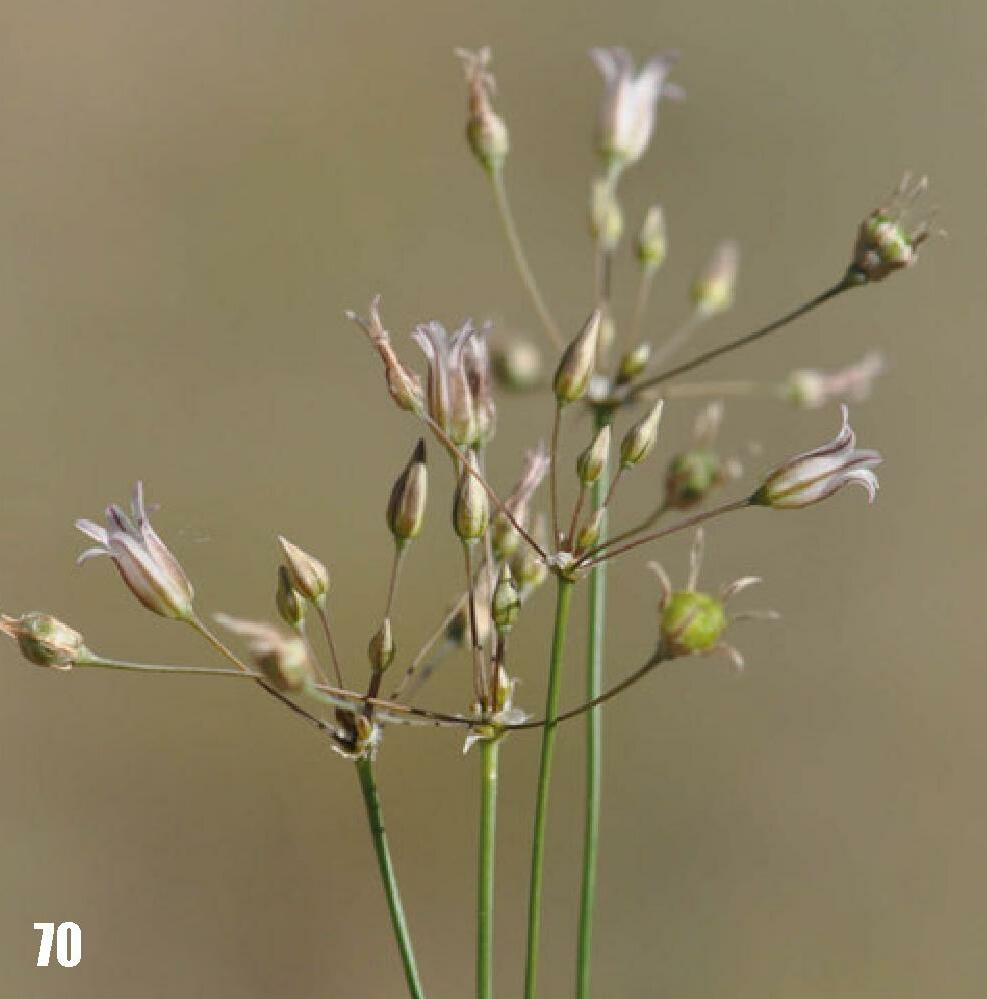

Scientific classification
- Kingdom: Plantae
- Clade: Tracheophytes
- Clade: Angiosperms
- Clade: Monocots
- Order: Asparagales
- Family: Amaryllidaceae
- Subfamily: Allioideae
- Genus: Allium
- Species: A. setifolium

Binomial name
- Allium setifolium Schrenk ex Fisch. & C.A. Mey

= Allium setifolium =

Лук щетинолистный 丝叶韭 si ye jiu

Species of flowering plant

Allium setifolium is an Asian species of wild onion native to Xinjiang, Kazakhstan, Kyrgyzstan and Mongolia. It occurs in desert regions at elevations of 400–1000 m.

Allium setifolium is well-adapted to life in a hot, arid environment. It has a cluster of narrow, egg-shaped bulbs each up to 10 mm in diameter. Scape is very short for the genus, rarely more than 10 cm tall. Leaves are reduced to hair-like bristles only 200-300 μm in diameter. Umbel has only a few red flowers.
