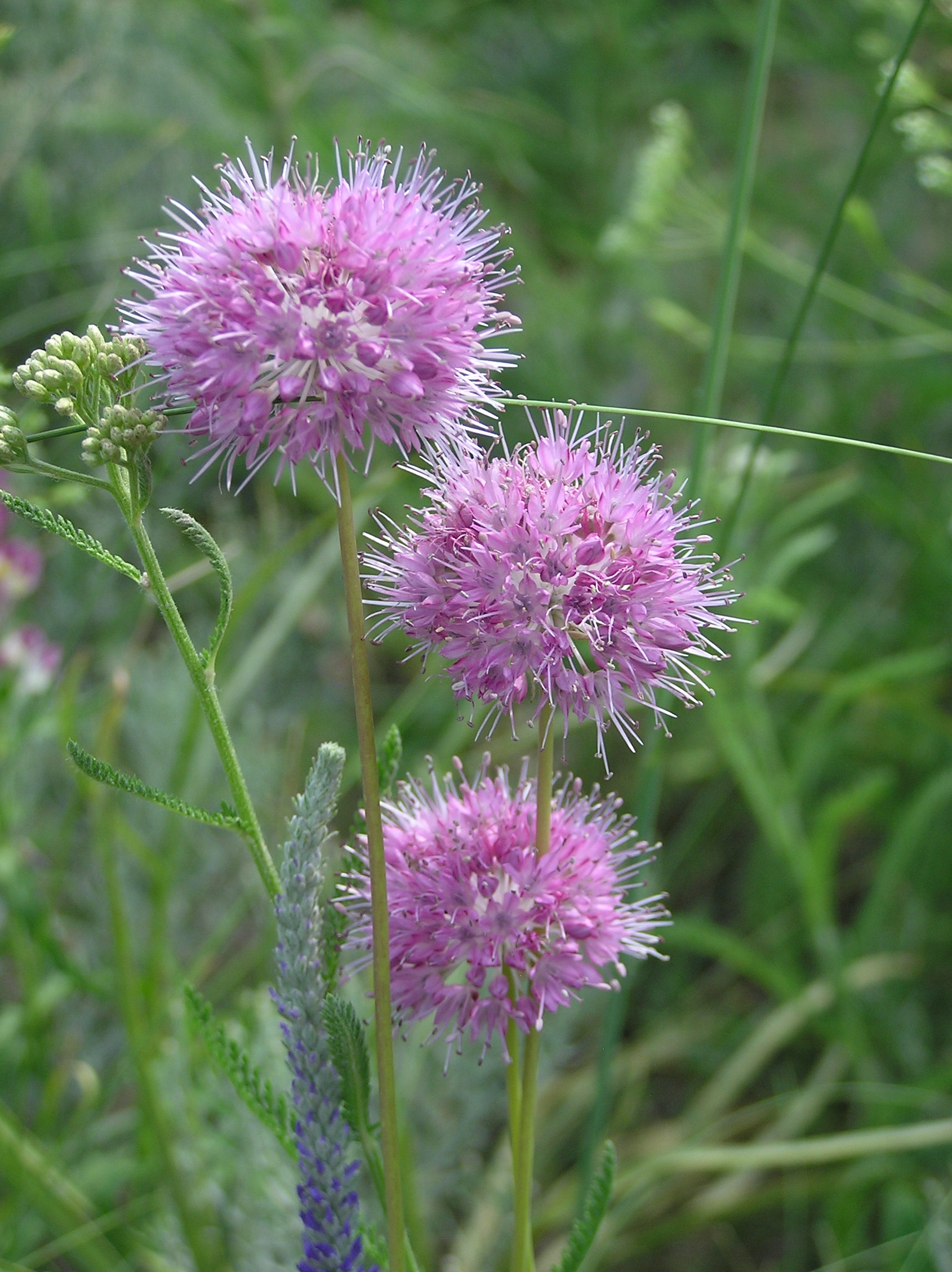

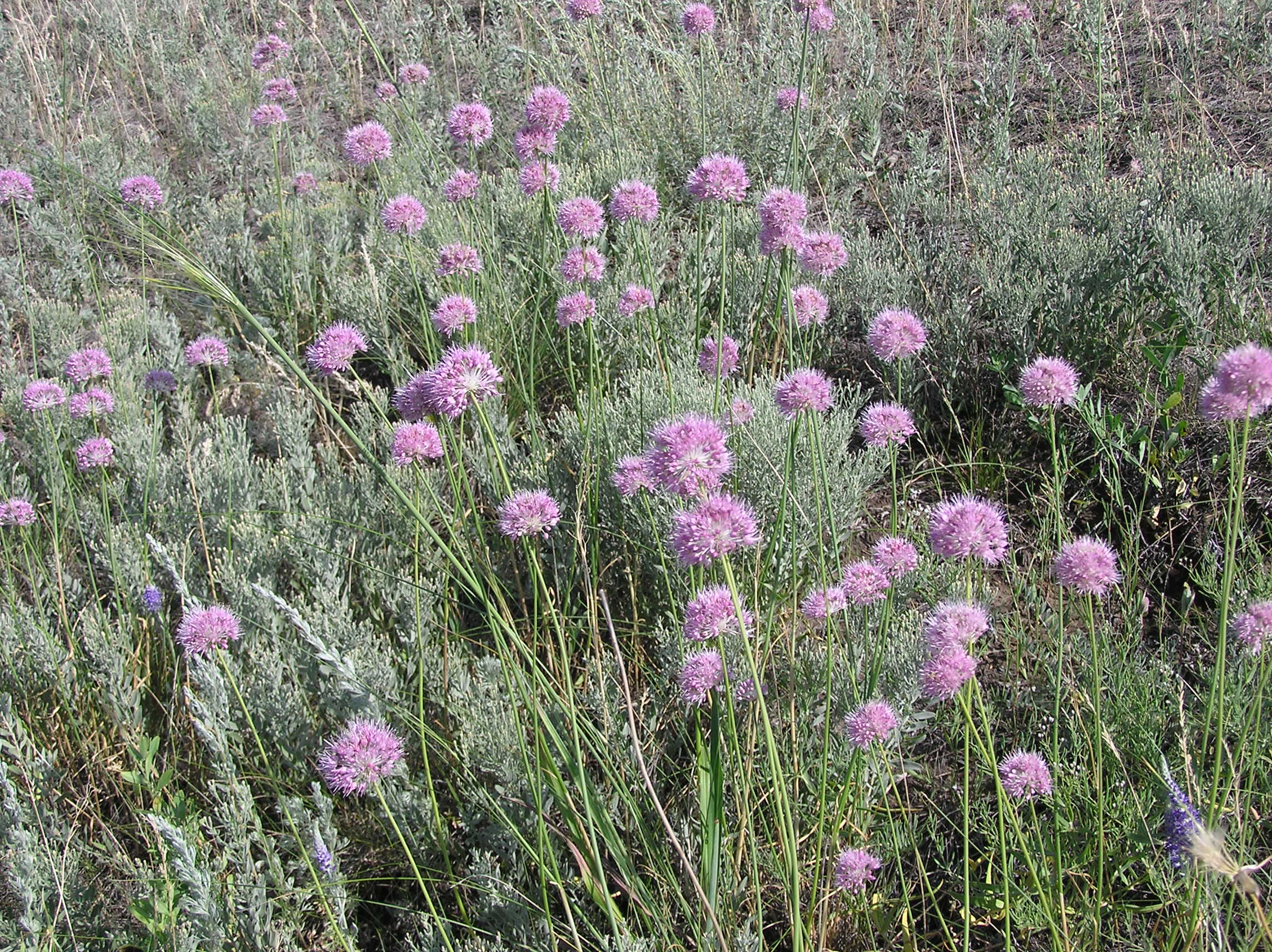

Scientific classification
- Kingdom: Plantae
- Clade: Tracheophytes
- Clade: Angiosperms
- Clade: Monocots
- Order: Asparagales
- Family: Amaryllidaceae
- Subfamily: Allioideae
- Genus: Allium
- Subgenus: A. subg. Polyprason
- Species: A. saxatile

Binomial name
- Allium saxatile M. Bieb. 1798, conserved name not Pall. 1776 nor Hohen. ex Boiss. 1882 nor M.Bieb. 1808

Synonyms
- Allium caucasicum M.Bieb.; Allium caucason Turra ex Sacc.; Allium globosum M.Bieb.; Allium gmelinianum Miscz. ex Grossh.; Allium moly Griseb. & Schur ex Regel, illegitimate; Allium moschatum Sint. ex Regel, illegitimate; Allium ochroleucum Rchb.; Allium paniculatum Ker Gawl.; Allium rupestre Fisch. ex Schrank; Allium ruprechtii Boiss.; Allium savranicum Besser; Allium stevenii Willd. ex Ledeb.; Allium tauricum Pall. ex G.Don; Allium tenuifolium Schur

= Allium saxatile =

Species of flowering plant

Allium saxatile is a Eurasian species of onion native to European Russia, Belarus, Caucasus, and the Altai Krai region in Siberia. The species was formerly perceived as including additional populations from central and eastern Asia but recent studies have resulting in splitting of the old species into several distinct species.
