= Erigeron oreades =

Scientific classification
- Kingdom: Plantae
- Clade: Tracheophytes
- Clade: Angiosperms
- Clade: Eudicots
- Clade: Asterids
- Order: Asterales
- Family: Asteraceae
- Genus: Erigeron
- Species: E. oreades

Binomial name
- Erigeron oreades (Schrenk ex Fisch. & C.A.Mey.) Fisch. & C.A.Mey.

Synonyms
- Erigeron uniflorus var. oreades Schrenk ex Fisch. & C.A. Mey.; Erigeron alpinus var. oreades (Schrenk ex Fisch. & C.A. Mey.) Trautv.

Species of flowering plant

Erigeron oreades is an Asian species of flowering plants in the family Asteraceae. It grows on slopes and meadows in Xinjiang, Mongolia, Kazakhstan, and Siberia.

Erigeron oreades is a perennial herb up to 25 cm (10 inches) tall, forming a slim underground rhizomes. Its flower heads have pale purple ray florets surrounding yellow disc florets.
