= Iljinskaea =

Scientific classification
- Kingdom: Plantae
- Clade: Tracheophytes
- Clade: Angiosperms
- Clade: Eudicots
- Clade: Rosids
- Order: Brassicales
- Family: Brassicaceae
- Tribe: Isatideae
- Genus: Iljinskaea; Al-Shehbaz, Özüdoğru & D.A.German
- Species: I. planisiliqua

Binomial name
- Iljinskaea planisiliqua (Fisch. & C.A.Mey.) Al-Shehbaz, Özüdoğru & D.A.German

Synonyms
- Conringia planisiliqua Fisch. & C.A.Mey. (1837) (basionym); Erysimum patisiliquosum Wender.; Erysimum patisiliquum Wender.; Erysimum planisiliquum Steud. ex Ledeb.; Sisymbrium planisiliquum Hook.f. & Thomson

Genus of flowering plants

Iljinskaea is a genus of flowering plants in the family Brassicaceae. It includes a single species, Iljinskaea planisiliqua, an annual plant native to the Caucasus, Iran, Pakistan, the western Himalayas, Central Asia, Tibet, Xinjiang, and Mongolia, and to northwestern Greece and southwestern Bulgaria.

The species was first described as Conringia planisiliqua by Friedrich Ernst Ludwig von Fischer and Carl Anton von Meyer. In 2021 Ihsan Ali Al-Shehbaz, Barış Özüdoğru, and Dmitry A. German placed it in the new monotypic genus Iljinskaea as Iljinskaea planisiliqua.
