= Szovitsia =

Scientific classification
- Kingdom: Plantae
- Clade: Embryophytes
- Clade: Tracheophytes
- Clade: Angiosperms
- Clade: Eudicots
- Clade: Asterids
- Order: Apiales
- Family: Apiaceae
- Subtribe: Torilidinae
- Genus: Szovitsia; Fisch. & C.A.Mey.

Genus of flowering plants

Szovitsia is a monotypic genus of flowering plant belonging to the family Apiaceae. It only contains one known species, Szovitsia callicarpa Fisch. & C.A.Mey.

Its native range is eastern Turkey to the Transcaucasus (within Armenia, Georgia, and Azerbaijan), and north-western Iran.

The genus name of Szovitsia is in honour of Johann Nepomuk Szovits (1782–1830), a Hungarian-born Russian apothecary and botanist. The Latin specific epithet of callicarpa refers to Callicarpa (or beautyberry), which is a genus of shrubs and small trees in the family Lamiaceae. Both the genus and the species were first described and published in Index Seminum (LE, Petropolitanus) Vol.1 on page 39 in 1835.
