= Peperomia urocarpa =

Scientific classification
- Kingdom: Plantae
- Clade: Tracheophytes
- Clade: Angiosperms
- Clade: Magnoliids
- Order: Piperales
- Family: Piperaceae
- Genus: Peperomia
- Species: P. urocarpa

Binomial name
- Peperomia urocarpa Fisch. & C.A.Mey.

Synonyms
- Acrocarpidium majus Miq.; Acrocarpidium urocarpum (Fisch. & C.A.Mey.) Miq.; Acrocarpidium urospermum Schltdl.; Peperomia aguacatensis var. orosiana Trel.; Peperomia aguacatensis var. picta Trel.; Peperomia aguacatensis var. urocarpoides Trel.; Peperomia condotoana Trel. & Yunck.; Peperomia donnell-smithii C.DC.; Peperomia fumeana Stehlé & Trel.; Peperomia hederacea Miq.; Peperomia major (Miq.) C.DC.; Peperomia major var. hispida C.DC.; Peperomia negotiosa Trel.; Peperomia novae-hispaniae Trel.; Peperomia pilosula C.DC.; Peperomia praecox Trel.; Peperomia pseudomajor C.DC.; Peperomia subpubistachya Yunck.; Peperomia tacanana Trel. & Standl.; Peperomia tremuliformis Trel.; Peperomia urocarpoides C.DC.; Piper monostachion Vell.

Species of perennial herb

Peperomia urocarpa (Also known as Brazilian peperomia) is a species of perennial herb in the genus Peperomia. The native range of Peperomia urocarpa is most of South America, Mexico, and parts of the Caribbean Its habit is epiphyte and a herb. In Colombia, its elevation range is 5–2000 Meters.
