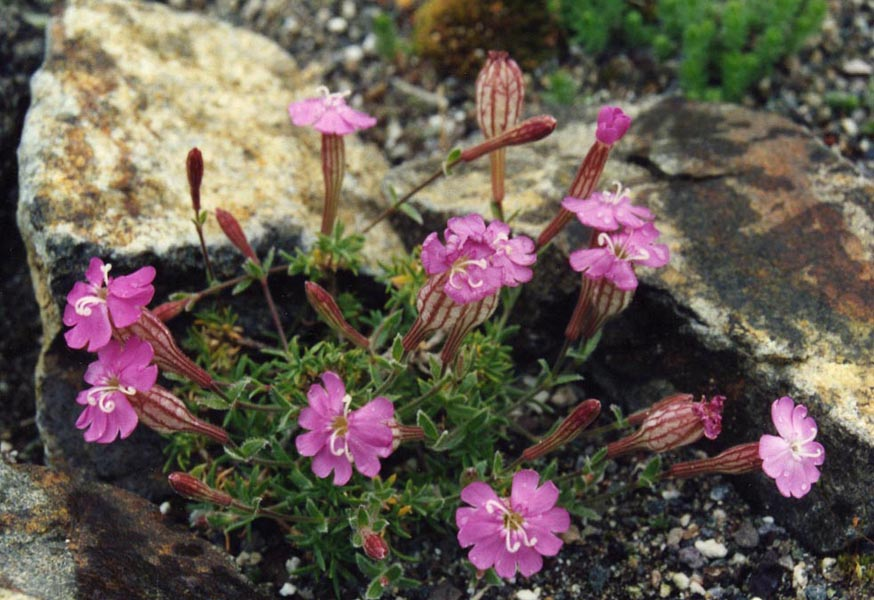

Scientific classification
- Kingdom: Plantae
- Clade: Tracheophytes
- Clade: Angiosperms
- Clade: Eudicots
- Order: Caryophyllales
- Family: Caryophyllaceae
- Genus: Silene
- Species: S. argaea

Binomial name
- Silene argaea Fisch. & C.A.Mey.

= Silene argaea =

Species of flowering plant

Silene argaea, commonly known as the Turkish catchfly, is a species of plant native to central Turkey. It can be found at Denver Botanic Gardens.

The species is perennial. It mainly grows in a temperate climate and grows in tufts.
