= Augusteae =

Scientific classification
- Kingdom: Plantae
- Clade: Tracheophytes
- Clade: Angiosperms
- Clade: Eudicots
- Clade: Asterids
- Order: Gentianales
- Family: Rubiaceae
- Subfamily: Ixoroideae
- Tribe: Augusteae; Kainul. & B.Bremer

Type genus
- Augusta Pohl

Tribe of angiosperms

Augusteae is a tribe of flowering plants in the family Rubiaceae and contains 89 species in 3 genera. Augusta is found from Mexico to Brazil and in the southwestern Pacific region, Wendlandia is found in northeastern tropical Africa, tropical and subtropical Asia and Queensland, and Guihaiothamnus is found in South China.

== Genera ==
Currently accepted names

- Augusta Pohl (4 sp)
- Guihaiothamnus H.S.Lo (1 sp)
- Wendlandia Bartl. ex DC. (84 sp)

Synonyms

- Augustea DC. = Augusta
- Bonifacia Silva Manso ex Steud. = Augusta
- Katoutheka Adans. = Wendlandia
- Lindenia Benth. = Augusta
- Schreibersia Pohl = Augusta
- Sestinia Boiss. & Hohen. = Wendlandia
- Siphonia Benth. = Augusta
