= Schrenkia =

Scientific classification
- Kingdom: Plantae
- Clade: Tracheophytes
- Clade: Angiosperms
- Clade: Eudicots
- Clade: Asterids
- Order: Apiales
- Family: Apiaceae
- Subfamily: Apioideae
- Tribe: Pyramidoptereae
- Genus: Schrenkia; Fisch. & C.A.Mey.

Synonyms
- Kosopoljanskia Korovin

Genus of flowering plant

Schrenkia is a genus of flowering plants belonging to the family Apiaceae.

Its native range is Central Asia (within Kazakhstan, Kyrgyzstan, Tajikistan and Uzbekistan) to Xinjiang.

The genus name of Schrenkia is in honour of Alexander von Schrenk (1816–1876), a Russian naturalist born near Tula in what was then the Russian Empire. He was a brother to zoologist Leopold von Schrenck (1826–1894). It was first described and published in Enum. Pl. Nov. Vol.1 on page 63 in 1841.

== Known species ==
According to Kew:

- Schrenkia alaica Pimenov
- Schrenkia congesta Korovin
- Schrenkia golickeana (Regel & Schmalh.) B.Fedtsch.
- Schrenkia hebecarpa (Pimenov & Kamelin) Pimenov
- Schrenkia involucrata Regel & Schmalh.
- Schrenkia kultiassovii Korovin
- Schrenkia papillaris Regel & Schmalh.
- Schrenkia pulverulenta Pimenov
- Schrenkia pungens Regel & Schmalh.
- Schrenkia turkestanica (Korovin) Pimenov
- Schrenkia ugamica Korovin
- Schrenkia vaginata (Ledeb.) Fisch. & C.A.Mey.
