= Hohenackeria =

Scientific classification
- Kingdom: Plantae
- Clade: Tracheophytes
- Clade: Angiosperms
- Clade: Eudicots
- Clade: Asterids
- Order: Apiales
- Family: Apiaceae
- Subfamily: Apioideae
- Tribe: Bupleureae
- Genus: Hohenackeria; Fisch. & C.A.Mey.

Synonyms
- Keracia (Coss.) Calest.

Genus of plants

Hohenackeria is a genus of flowering plants belonging to the family Apiaceae.

Its native range is the western Mediterranean, Turkey to Caucasus. It is found in the countries of Algeria, Morocco, Spain and Turkey.

The genus name of Hohenackeria is in honour of Rudolph Friedrich Hohenacker (1798–1874), a Swiss-German missionary and botanist born in Zürich, and it was first described and published in Index Seminum (LE, Petropolitanus) Vol.2 on page 38 in 1836.

Known species, according to Kew:

- Hohenackeria exscapa (Steven) Grande
- Hohenackeria polyodon Coss. & Durieu
