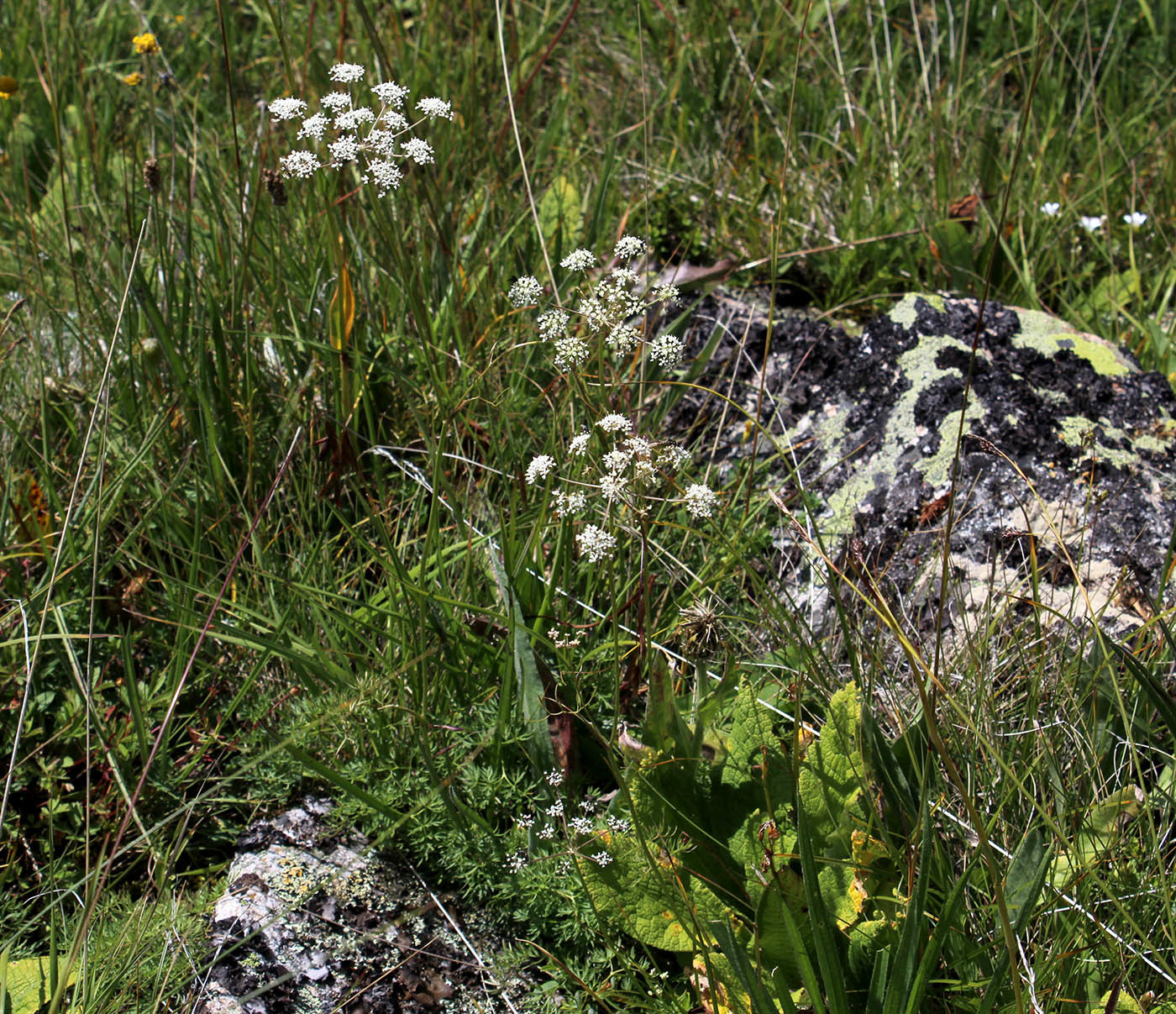

Scientific classification
- Kingdom: Plantae
- Clade: Tracheophytes
- Clade: Angiosperms
- Clade: Eudicots
- Clade: Asterids
- Order: Apiales
- Family: Apiaceae
- Genus: Lomatocarum; Fisch. & C.A.Mey.
- Species: L. alpinum

Binomial name
- Lomatocarum alpinum (M.Bieb.) Fisch. & C.A.Mey.

Synonyms
- Carum alpinum (M.Bieb.) Benth. & Hook.f. ex B.D.Jacks.; Carum alpinum var. filifolium Sommier & Levier; Carum colchicum Lipsky; Carum lomatocarum Boiss.; Ligusticum alpinum (M.Bieb.) Spreng.; Seseli alpinum M.Bieb. (1808) (basionym); Seseli vulgatum Boreau; Wallrothia divaricata C.Presl

= Lomatocarum =

Genus of flowering plants

Lomatocarum is a genus of flowering plants in the family Apiaceae. It includes a single species, Lomatocarum alpinum, a perennial endemic to the Caucasus.
