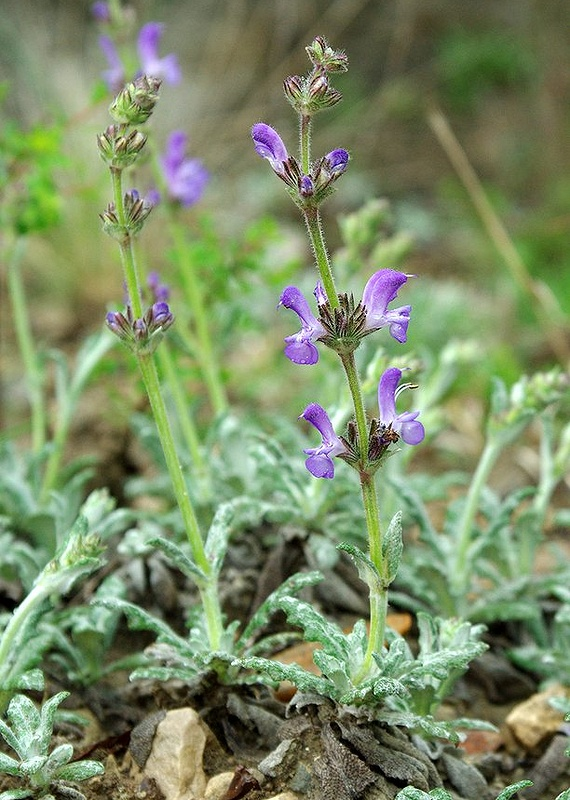
- Salvia canescens in Gunib, Daghestan

Scientific classification
- Kingdom: Plantae
- Clade: Tracheophytes
- Clade: Angiosperms
- Clade: Eudicots
- Clade: Asterids
- Order: Lamiales
- Family: Lamiaceae
- Genus: Salvia
- Species: S. canescens

Binomial name
- Salvia canescens C.A.Mey.

Varieties
- S. canescens var. canescens C.A.Mey.; S. canescens var. daghestanica (Sosn.) Menitsky

= Salvia canescens =

Species of flowering plant

Salvia canescens, also known as the hoary sage, is a herbaceous perennial that is endemic to the Caucasus Mountains. The specific epithet, canescens, refers to the off-white hairs covering the leaves.

Salvia canescens was first described in 1831 by the Russian botanist Carl Anton von Meyer. The English botanist George Bentham applied the same name to a different species, which he corrected in his 1833 volume of Labiatarum Genera et Species by applying S. canescens Benth. as a synonym of Salvia pallida. In 1992, the Russian botanist Y. L. Menitsky reduced the species Salvia daghestanica, originally described in 1951 by Dmitrii Ivanovich Sosnowsky, to a variety of S. canescens, thus also requiring the autonym S. canescens var. canescens.

Salvia canescens var. daghestanica reaches nearly 1 ft (0.30 m) tall and wide, forming a mound with snow-white 1 to 4 in (2.5 to 10.2 cm) leaves that are covered with white hairs on top and bottom. It has royal purple flowers growing in whorls that bloom in summer and again in autumn, reaching just over .5 in (1.3 cm) long with a small calyx. Inflorescences grow to 1 ft (0.30 m) long, holding the flowers above the foliage.
