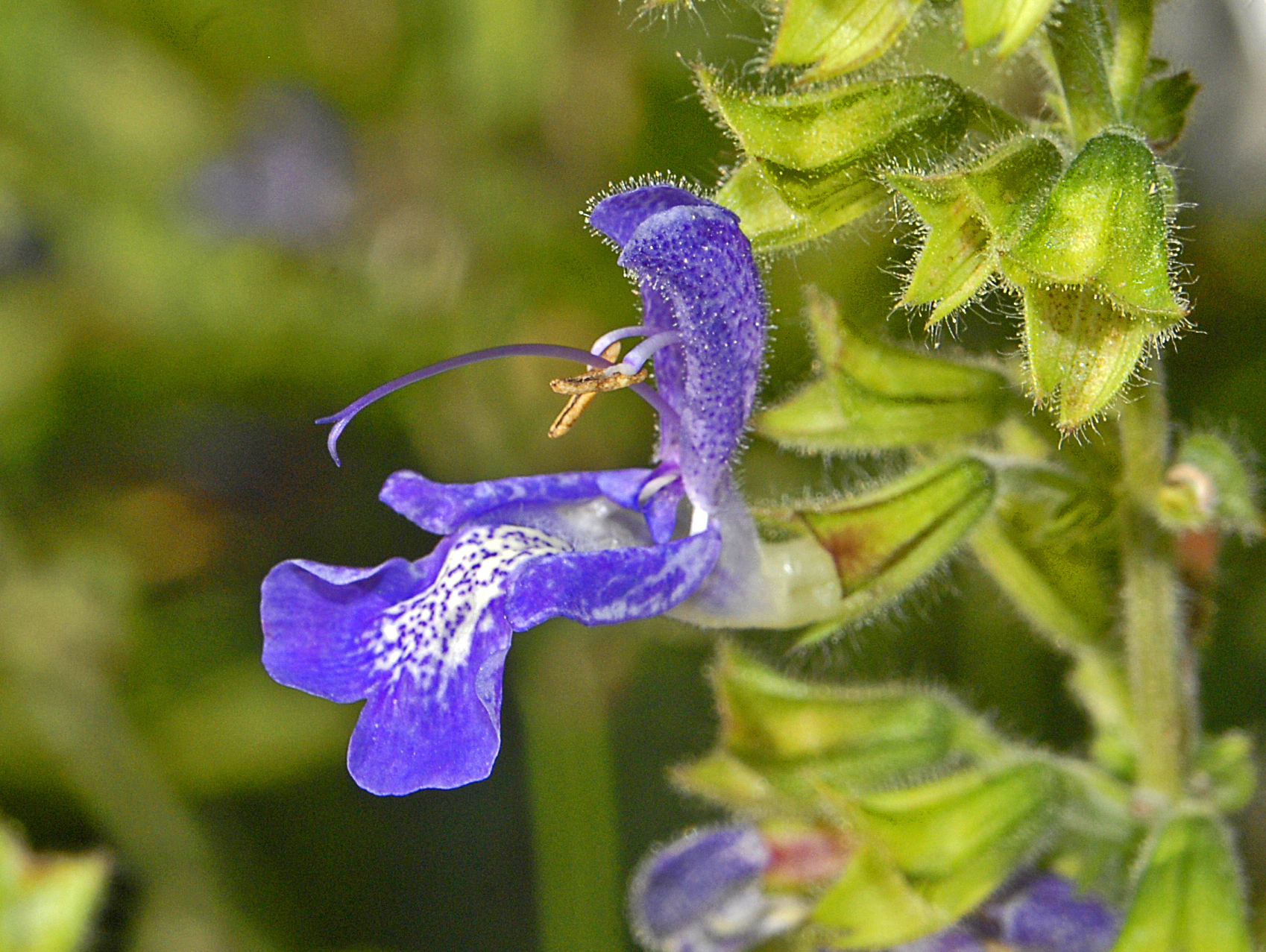
- Flower of Salvia transsylvanica at the Orto Botanico di Brera

Scientific classification
- Kingdom: Plantae
- Clade: Tracheophytes
- Clade: Angiosperms
- Clade: Eudicots
- Clade: Asterids
- Order: Lamiales
- Family: Lamiaceae
- Genus: Salvia
- Species: S. transsylvanica

Binomial name
- Salvia transsylvanica (Schur ex Griseb. & Schenk) Schur

Synonyms
- Salvia pratensis var. transsylvanica Schur ex Griseb. & Schenk; Sclarea transsylvanica (Schur ex Griseb. & Schenk) Soják; Salvia baumgartenii Heuff. ex Griseb. & Schenk

= Salvia transsylvanica =

Species of flowering plant

Salvia transsylvanica is a species of flowering plant in the family Lamiaceae. It is a herbaceous perennial native to a wide area from north and central Russia to Romania. It was described and named in 1853 by botanist Philipp Johann Ferdinand Schur, with the specific epithet referring to the Transylvanian Alps located in central Romania. It was introduced into horticulture in the 1980s.

Salvia transsylvanica puts out several lax 2 feet (0.61 m) stems from a basal clump of leaves. The leaves that grow on the stem vary in size—being larger at the bottom—with the upper side being dark yellow-green and the underside pale with yellow veins. The leaves are very scalloped around the edges. The flowers are slightly longer than 0.5 inches (1.3 cm), and have a rich violet color, growing in loose whorls that are about .5 inches (1.3 cm) apart. Many flowers bloom at once, giving the plant a very colorful and striking appearance.
