= Cymbocarpum =

Scientific classification
- Kingdom: Plantae
- Clade: Tracheophytes
- Clade: Angiosperms
- Clade: Eudicots
- Clade: Asterids
- Order: Apiales
- Family: Apiaceae
- Subfamily: Apioideae
- Tribe: Tordylieae
- Genus: Cymbocarpum; DC. ex C.A.Mey.

Genus of flowering plants

Cymbocarpum is a genus of flowering plants belonging to the family Apiaceae.

Its native range is Western Asia, Caucasus.

Species:

- Cymbocarpum alinihatii Menemen & Çingay
- Cymbocarpum amanum Rech.f.
- Cymbocarpum anethoides DC. ex C.A.Mey.
- Cymbocarpum erythraeum (DC.) Boiss.
- Cymbocarpum wiedemannii Boiss.
