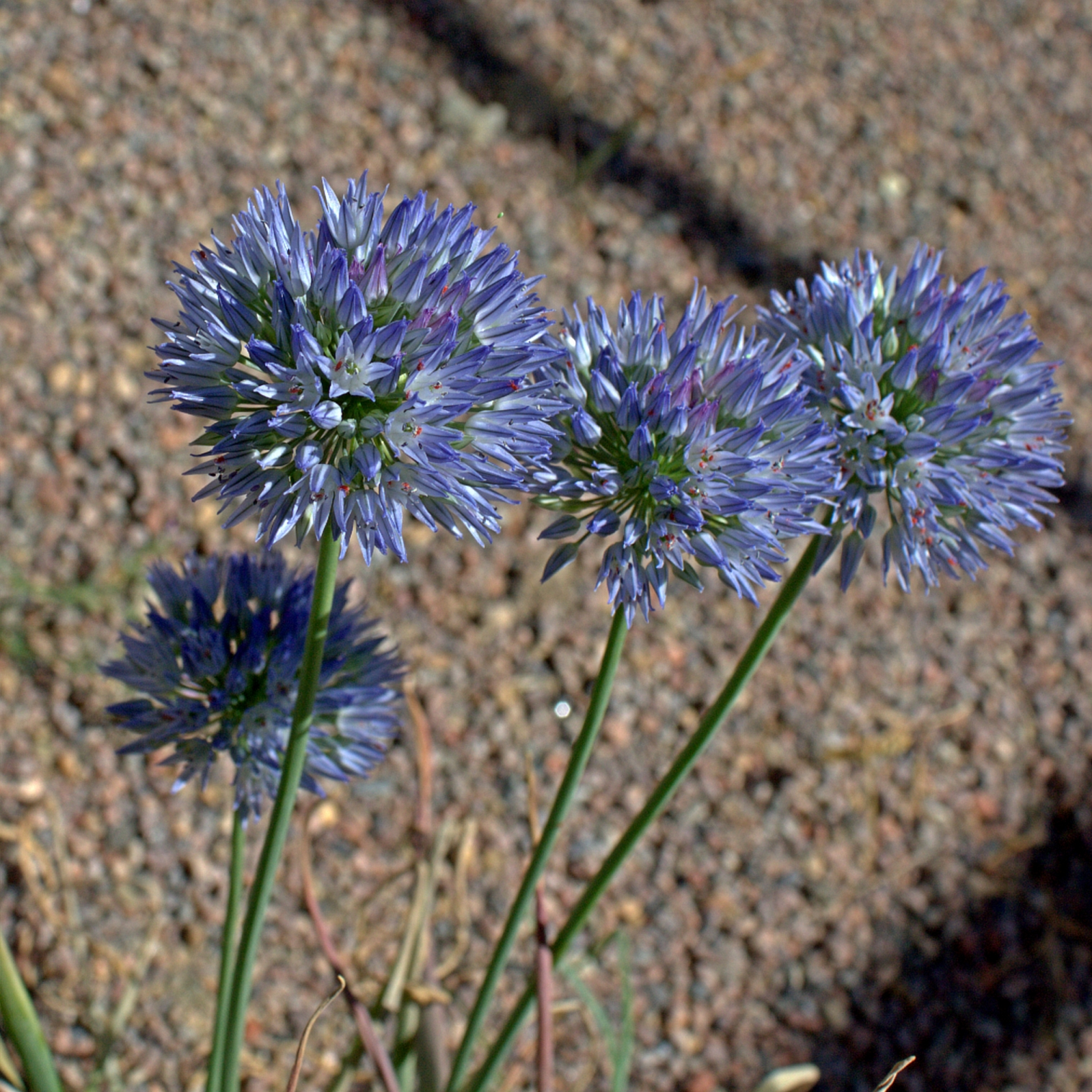

Scientific classification
- Kingdom: Plantae
- Clade: Tracheophytes
- Clade: Angiosperms
- Clade: Monocots
- Order: Asparagales
- Family: Amaryllidaceae
- Subfamily: Allioideae
- Genus: Allium
- Subgenus: A. subg. Allium
- Species: A. caesium

Binomial name
- Allium caesium Schrenk

Synonyms
- Allium aemulans Pavlov; Allium azureum Bunge; Allium caeruleum Stschegl.; Allium renardii Regel; Allium urceolatum Regel

= Allium caesium =

Species of plant

Allium caesium, light blue garlic, is a species of herbaceous perennial flowering plant native to central Asia (Xinjiang, Kazakhstan, Kyrgyzstan, Tajikistan, Uzbekistan). It grows in deserts and dry fields at elevations of 700–2,000 m (2,300–6,600 ft).

Allium caesium is typically about 30–40 cm (12–16 in) tall, and grows best in full sun to partial shade. It produces round bulbs up to 15 mm across. The scapes are up to 65 cm (26 in) tall. The leaves are round in cross-section, and slightly shorter than the scapes. The flowers are sky-blue. They typically appear in the summer (June to August in England) and attract pollinators such as bees and butterflies. The Latin specific epithet caesium means "grey-blue".

In cultivation in the UK, this plant has gained the Royal Horticultural Society's Award of Garden Merit. In the US it is suitable for hardiness zones 4-7.
