= Wendlandia psychotrioides =

Conservation status
- Critically Endangered (NCA)

Scientific classification
- Kingdom: Plantae
- Clade: Tracheophytes
- Clade: Angiosperms
- Clade: Eudicots
- Clade: Asterids
- Order: Gentianales
- Family: Rubiaceae
- Genus: Wendlandia
- Species: W. psychotrioides

Binomial name
- Wendlandia psychotrioides (F.Muell.) F.Muell.

Synonyms
- Oldenlandia psychotrioides F.Muell.

Species of shrub

Wendlandia psychotrioides names a species of shrubs or small trees, constituting part of the plant family Rubiaceae.

A previously thought to be extinct species, the only (endemic) records of the species were from in the Wet Tropics rainforests of north eastern Queensland, Australia.

It was scientifically described in 1889 and 1892 by Ferdinand von Mueller, notable colonial Melbourne Herbarium botanist. The specific name describes it as like Psychotria.

William A. Sayer, botanical collector associate of Mueller, collected specimens of it about "Mt Bellenden Ker" in 1887 as recorded on the "9/87" label written by Ferdinand von Mueller on his herbarium specimen sent on 15 March 1892 to Kew Royal Botanic Gardens, UK.

"On the Russell River; W. Sayers [sic]", is its location and collector recorded in Ferdinand von Mueller’s 1889 published original botanical description of this species. The region of the Russell River is the same as the region of Mount Bellenden Ker.

Mueller’s 1889 original botanical description of the species was under the name Oldenlandia psychotrioides. In 1892 he re-diagnosed it as constituting a species of this genus Wendlandia, after newly describing Wendlandia basistaminea as a species. He provided some comparative notes on them and related species of this genus.

== Conservation status ==
This species was formally listed as "Extinct in the Wild" under the Queensland Nature Conservation Act 1992. In June 2025, it was reclassified as "Critically Endangered". It is not listed under the Australian Environment Protection and Biodiversity Conservation Act 1999.
