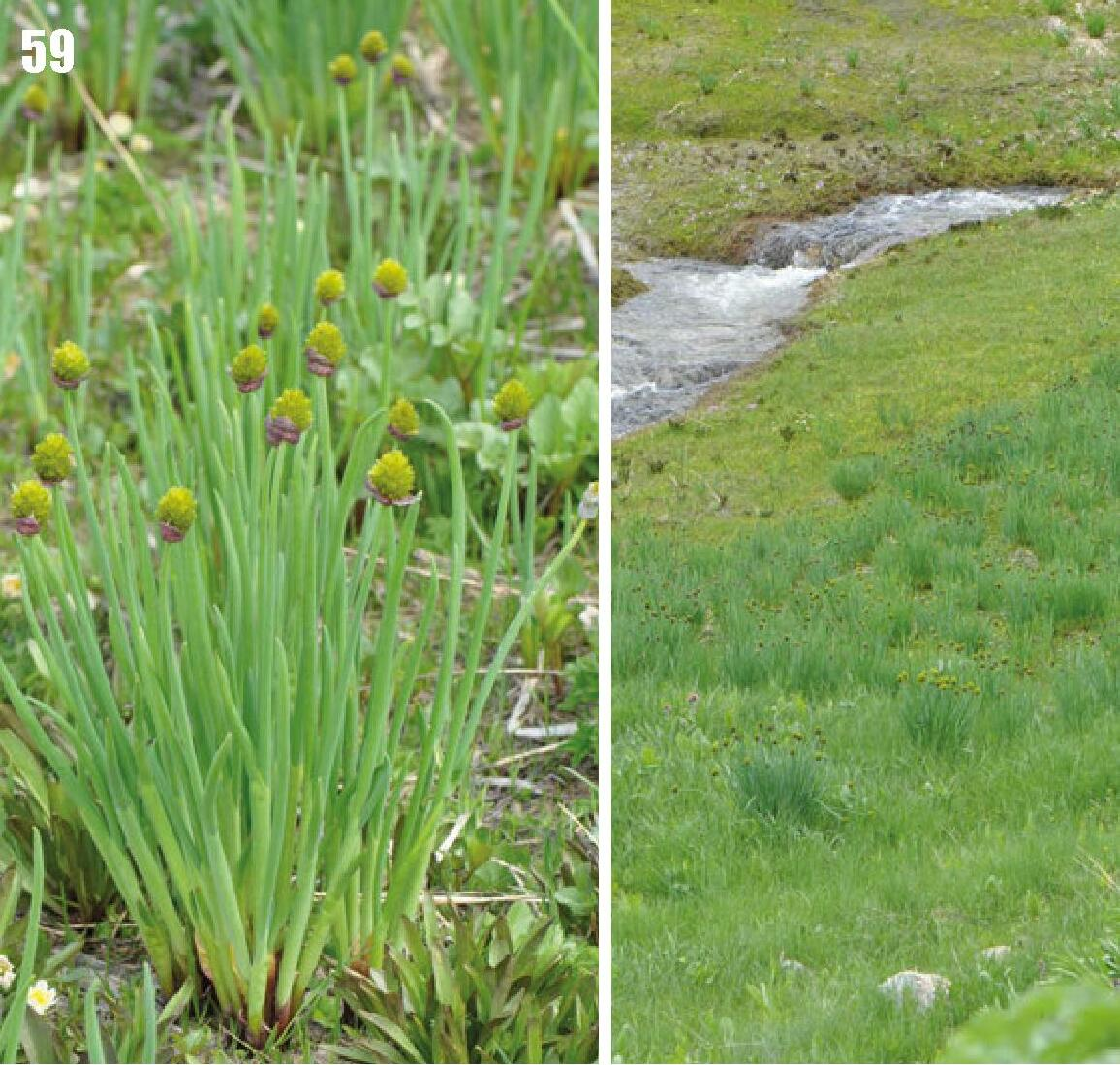

Scientific classification
- Kingdom: Plantae
- Clade: Tracheophytes
- Clade: Angiosperms
- Clade: Monocots
- Order: Asparagales
- Family: Amaryllidaceae
- Subfamily: Allioideae
- Genus: Allium
- Subgenus: A. subg. Cepa
- Species: A. atrosanguineum
- Variety: A. a. var. fedschenkoanum

Trinomial name
- Allium atrosanguineum var. fedschenkoanum (Regel) G.H.Zhu & Turland

Synonyms
- Allium fedschenkoanum Regel; Allium monadelphum var. fedschenkoanum (Regel) Regel

= Allium atrosanguineum var. fedschenkoanum =

Variety of onion

Allium atrosanguineum var. fedschenkoanum is an Allium variety found high in the high mountains of Pakistan, Afghanistan, Kazakhstan, Uzbekistan, Kyrgyzstan, Xinjiang, Tibet and Tajikistan. It is a bulb-forming perennial up to 50 cm tall, producing an umbel of yellow flowers.
