= Astragalus subsecundus =

Scientific classification
- Kingdom: Plantae
- Clade: Embryophytes
- Clade: Tracheophytes
- Clade: Angiosperms
- Clade: Eudicots
- Clade: Rosids
- Order: Fabales
- Family: Fabaceae
- Subfamily: Faboideae
- Genus: Astragalus
- Species: A. subsecundus

Binomial name
- Astragalus subsecundus Boiss. & Hohen.

Synonyms
- Tragacantha subsecunda (Boiss. & Hohen.) Kuntze

Species of flowering plant

Astragalus subsecundus is a species of milkvetch in the family Fabaceae. It is native to Iran and Turkey.
