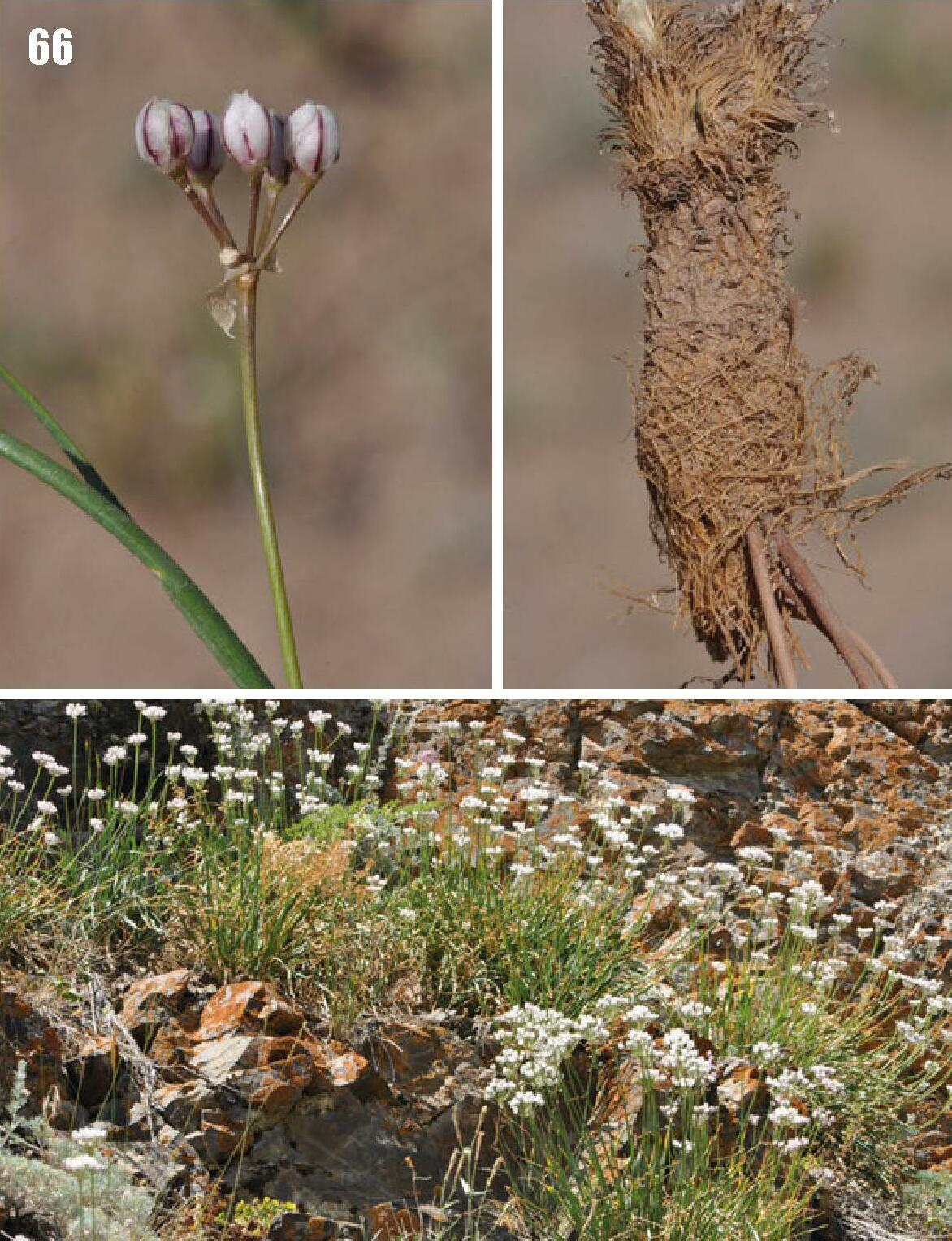

Scientific classification
- Kingdom: Plantae
- Clade: Tracheophytes
- Clade: Angiosperms
- Clade: Monocots
- Order: Asparagales
- Family: Amaryllidaceae
- Subfamily: Allioideae
- Genus: Allium
- Subgenus: A. subg. Butomissa
- Species: A. oreoprasum

Binomial name
- Allium oreoprasum Schrenk

= Allium oreoprasum =

滩地韭 tan di jiu Лук горный

Species of plant

Allium oreoprasum is a species of wild onion native to Central Asia. It has been found in Xinjiang, Tibet, Afghanistan, Kazakhstan, Kyrgyzstan, Pakistan, Tajikistan, Uzbekistan It grows at elevations of 1200–2700 m.

Allium oreoprasum produces clumps of narrow bulbs up to 10 mm in diameter. Scape is up to 40 cm tall. Umbel has only a few flowers. Tepals are white or pale red with a dark purple midvein.
