= Astragalus macrosemius =

Scientific classification
- Kingdom: Plantae
- Clade: Embryophytes
- Clade: Tracheophytes
- Clade: Spermatophytes
- Clade: Angiosperms
- Clade: Eudicots
- Clade: Rosids
- Order: Fabales
- Family: Fabaceae
- Subfamily: Faboideae
- Genus: Astragalus
- Species: A. macrosemius

Binomial name
- Astragalus macrosemius Boiss. & Hohen.

Synonyms
- Tragacantha macrosemia (Boiss. & Hohen.) Kuntze

Species of flowering plant

Astragalus macrosemius is a species of milkvetch in the family Fabaceae. It is endemic to Iran.
