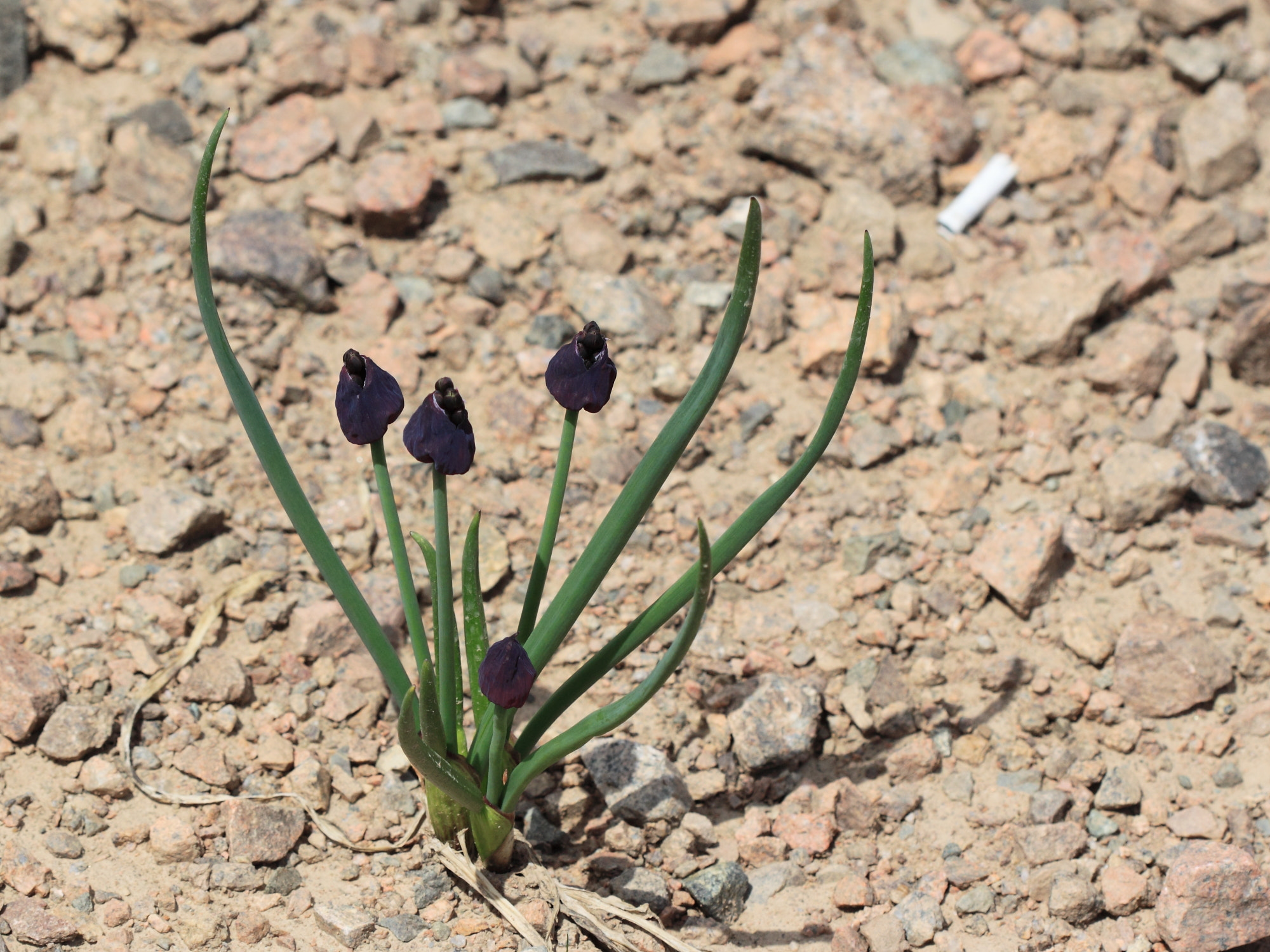

Scientific classification
- Kingdom: Plantae
- Clade: Tracheophytes
- Clade: Angiosperms
- Clade: Monocots
- Order: Asparagales
- Family: Amaryllidaceae
- Subfamily: Allioideae
- Genus: Allium
- Subgenus: A. subg. Cepa
- Species: A. atrosanguineum

Binomial name
- Allium atrosanguineum Schrenk

Synonyms
- Allium monadelphum Less. ex Kunth; Allium fedschenkoanum Regel; Allium kaufmannii Regel

= Allium atrosanguineum =

Species of flowering plant

Allium atrosanguineum is an Asian species of onion native to China, Siberia, Mongolia, and Central Asia. It grows high in the mountains at elevations of 2400–5400 m.

Allium atrosanguineum produces cylindrical bulbs up to 10 mm in diameter. Scapes are round in cross-section, up to 60 cm tall. Leaves are round in cross-section, usually shorter than the scapes. Umbels appear spherical from a distance, with many flowers. Tepals are pink, yellow, copper-colored, brass-colored or purple, sometimes with small dark spots.

Three varieties are generally recognized:

- Allium atrosanguineum var. atrosanguineum—Tepals purple - red with small spots — western China (Qinghai, Sichuan, Xinjiang), Central Asia (Kazakhstan, Kyrgyzstan, Tajikistan, Uzbekistan, Afghanistan), Pakistan, Siberia (Tuva, Buryatiya, Krasnoyarsk, Zabaykalsky Krai), Mongolia
- Allium atrosanguineum var. fedschenkoanum (Regel) G.H.Zhu & Turland - tepals pale yellow or pink — Central Asia (Kazakhstan, Kyrgyzstan, Tajikistan, Uzbekistan, Afghanistan), Pakistan, Tibet, Xinjiang
- Allium atrosanguineum var. tibeticum (Regel) G.H.Zhu & Turland — tepals copper-colored or brass-colored — Western China (Tibet, Gansu, Qinghai, Sichuan, Yunnan)
