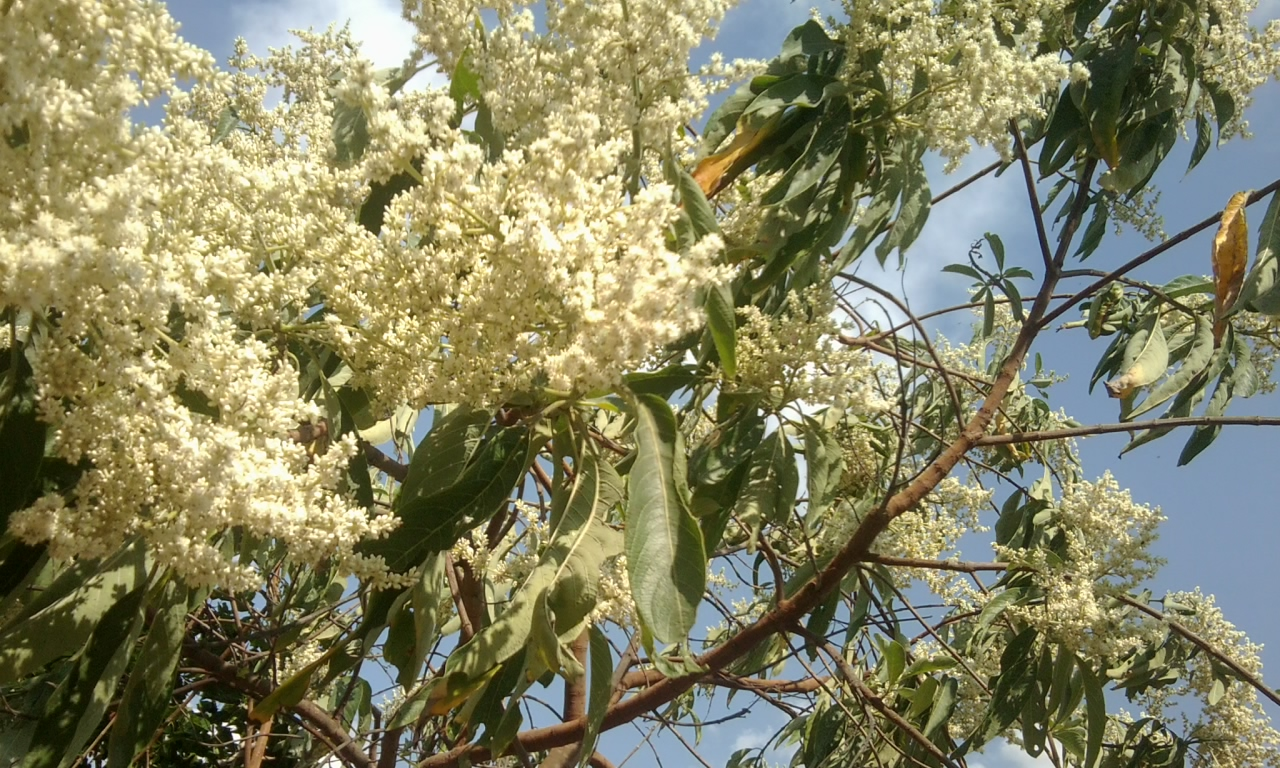
- Flower of Wendlandia heynei in Panchkhal, Nepal

Scientific classification
- Kingdom: Plantae
- Clade: Tracheophytes
- Clade: Angiosperms
- Clade: Eudicots
- Clade: Asterids
- Order: Gentianales
- Family: Rubiaceae
- Genus: Wendlandia
- Species: W. heynei

Binomial name
- Wendlandia heynei (Schult.) Santapau & Merchant

Synonyms
- Rondeletia cinerea Wall. Rondeletia exserta Roxb. Rondeletia heynei Schult. Rondeletia orissensis Roth; Rondeletia thyrsiflora Roth; Wendlandia cinerea DC. Wendlandia exserta (Roxb.) DC.

= Wendlandia heynei =

Species of plant

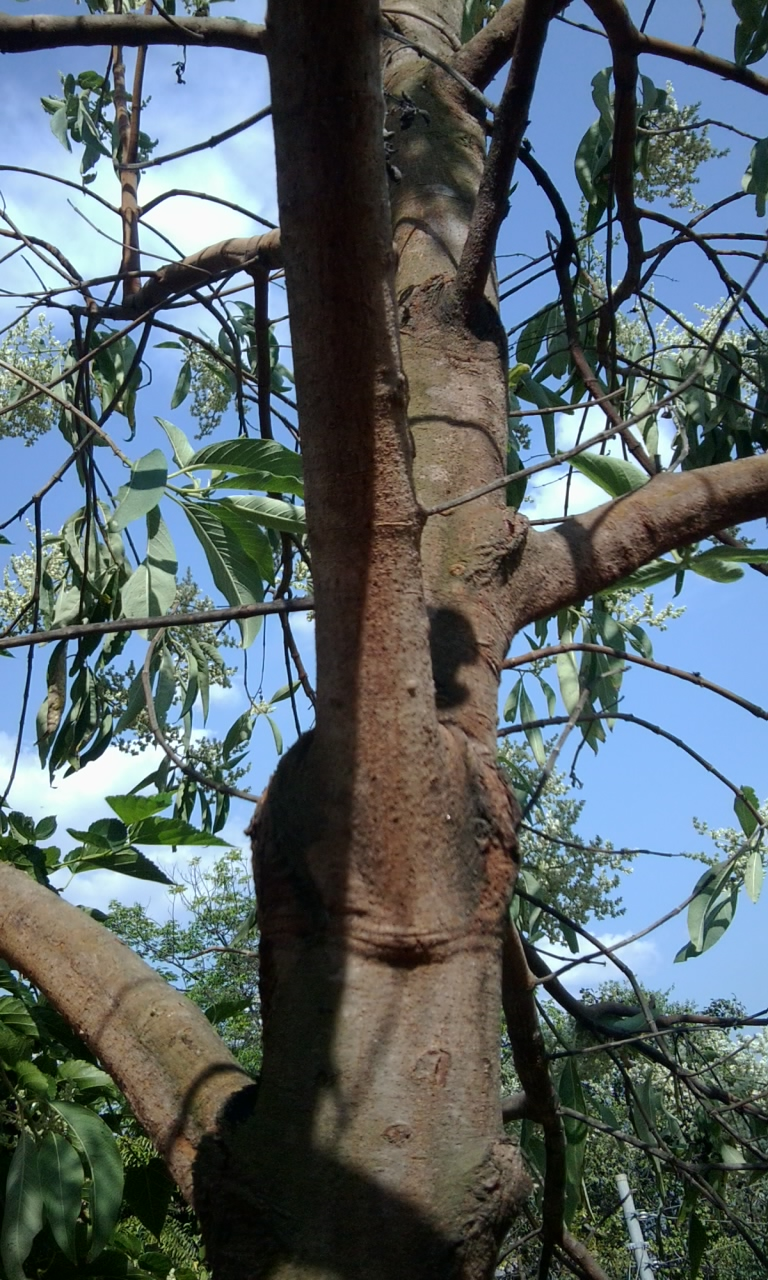
Branches and trunk of Wendlandia heynei

Wendlandia heynei (ukan pansara in Pakistan), (simtaaraa in Nepal) is an evergreen tree species in the family Rubiaceae.
