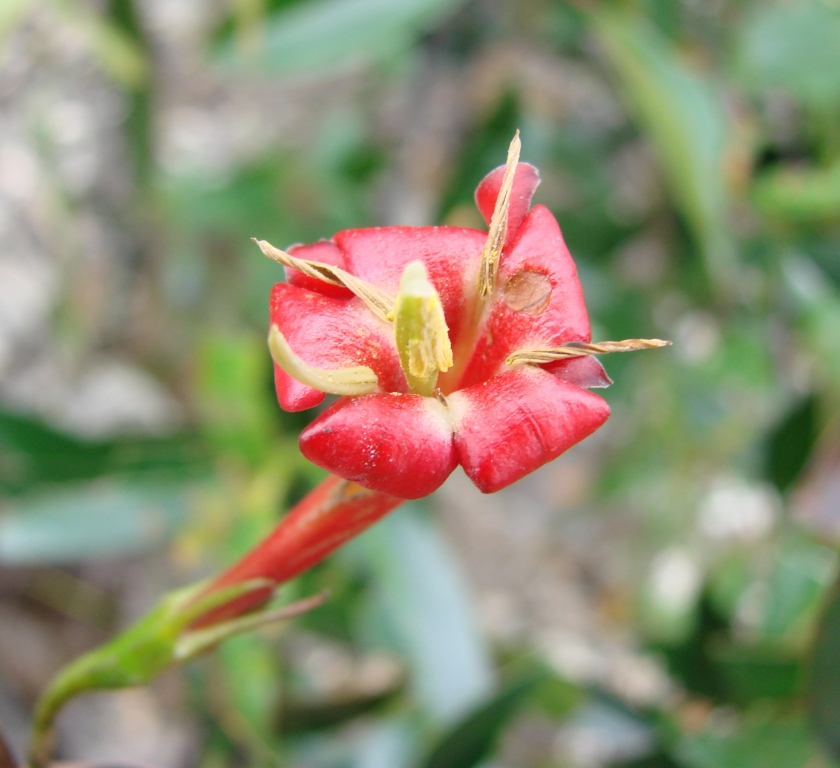
- Augusta longifolia

Scientific classification
- Kingdom: Plantae
- Clade: Tracheophytes
- Clade: Angiosperms
- Clade: Eudicots
- Clade: Asterids
- Order: Gentianales
- Family: Rubiaceae
- Subfamily: Ixoroideae
- Tribe: Augusteae
- Genus: Augusta; Pohl

Type species
- Augusta lanceolata (synonym of Augusta longifolia var. longifolia) Pohl

= Augusta (plant) =

Genus of plants

Augusta is a genus of flowering plants in the family Rubiaceae. It is found in tropical Latin America from Mexico to Brazil and also in the southwestern Pacific (Fiji and New Caledonia).

== Species ==
- Augusta austrocaledonica (Brongn.) J.H.Kirkbr. - New Caledonia
- Augusta longifolia (Spreng.) Rehder - Brazil
  - Augusta longifolia var. longifolia
  - Augusta longifolia var. parvifolia (Pohl) Delprete - Rio de Janeiro
- Augusta rivalis (Benth.) J.H.Kirkbr. - Mexico, Central America, Colombia
- Augusta vitiensis (Seem.) J.H.Kirkbr. - Fiji
