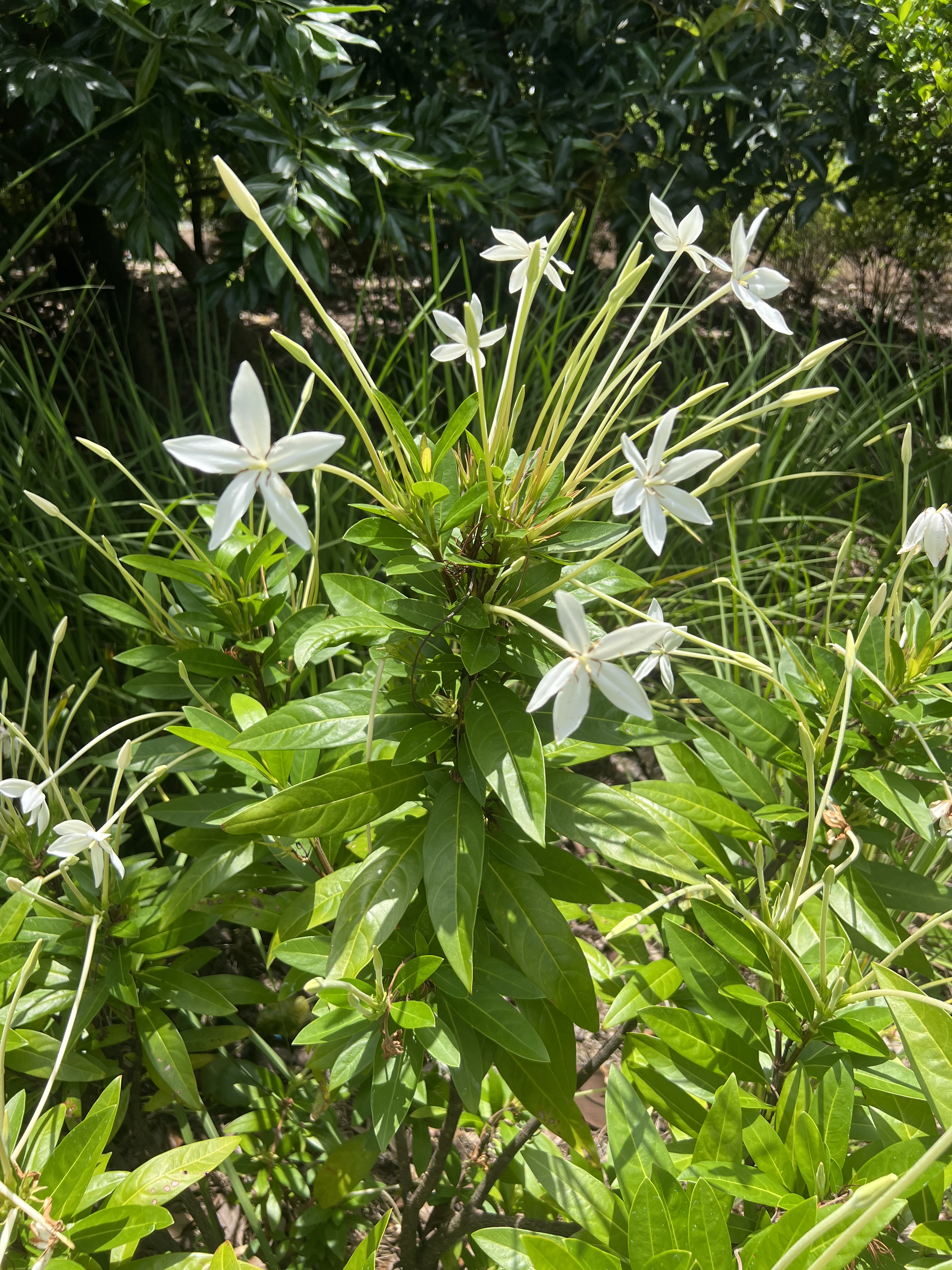

Scientific classification
- Kingdom: Plantae
- Clade: Tracheophytes
- Clade: Angiosperms
- Clade: Eudicots
- Clade: Asterids
- Order: Gentianales
- Family: Rubiaceae
- Genus: Augusta
- Species: A. rivalis

Binomial name
- Augusta rivalis (Benth.) J.H.Kirkbr.

Synonyms
- Lindenia rivalis Benth.; Augusta rivalis f. glabra (SPDarwin) JHKirkbr.; Lindenia acutiflora Benth.; Lindenia rivalis f. glabra SPDarwin; Siphonia rivalis Benth.

= Augusta rivalis =

Species of plant

Augusta rivalis is a plant species native to Mexico, Central America and Colombia.
