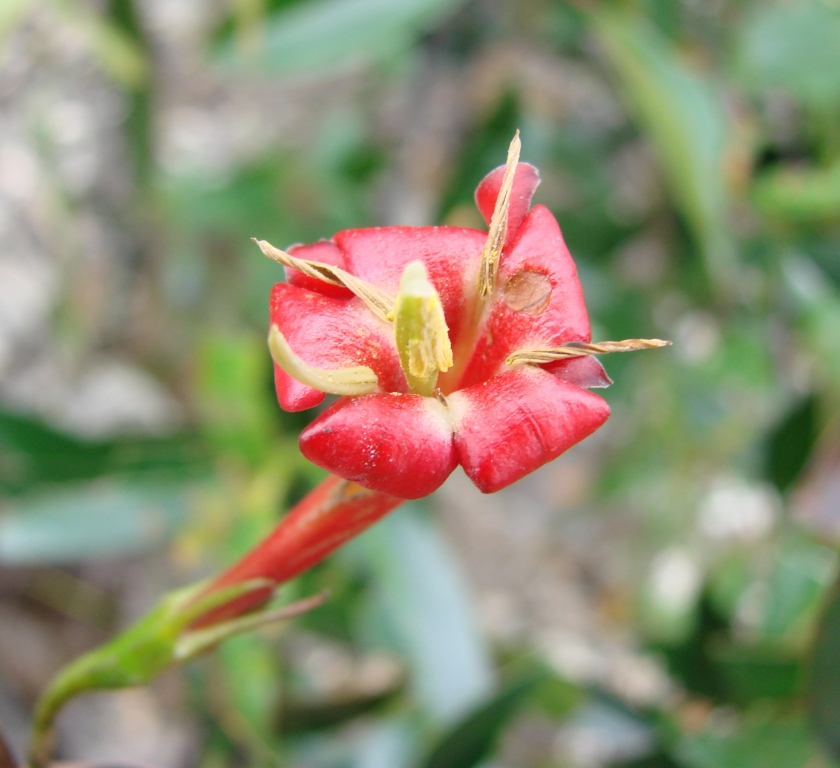

Scientific classification
- Kingdom: Plantae
- Clade: Tracheophytes
- Clade: Angiosperms
- Clade: Eudicots
- Clade: Asterids
- Order: Gentianales
- Family: Rubiaceae
- Genus: Augusta
- Species: A. longifolia

Binomial name
- Augusta longifolia (Spreng.) Rehder

Synonyms
- Schreibersia longifolia (Spreng.) Kuntze; Tocoyena longifolia (Spreng.) Angely; Tocoyena mansoana Angely; Ucriana longifolia Spreng.

= Augusta longifolia =

Species of plant

Augusta longifolia is a plant species native to Brazil.
