= Wendlandia angustifolia =

Conservation status
- Endangered (IUCN 3.1)

Scientific classification
- Kingdom: Plantae
- Clade: Tracheophytes
- Clade: Angiosperms
- Clade: Eudicots
- Clade: Asterids
- Order: Gentianales
- Family: Rubiaceae
- Genus: Wendlandia
- Species: W. angustifolia

Binomial name
- Wendlandia angustifolia Wight

Species of plant

Wendlandia angustifolia is a species of plant in the family Rubiaceae. It is endemic to Tamil Nadu, India. The species was presumed to be extinct until 1998, when it was rediscovered after a gap of 81 years near its previously known natural habitat, during an inventory of threatened plants of Kalakkad Mundantharai Tiger Reserve, Tamil Nadu.
