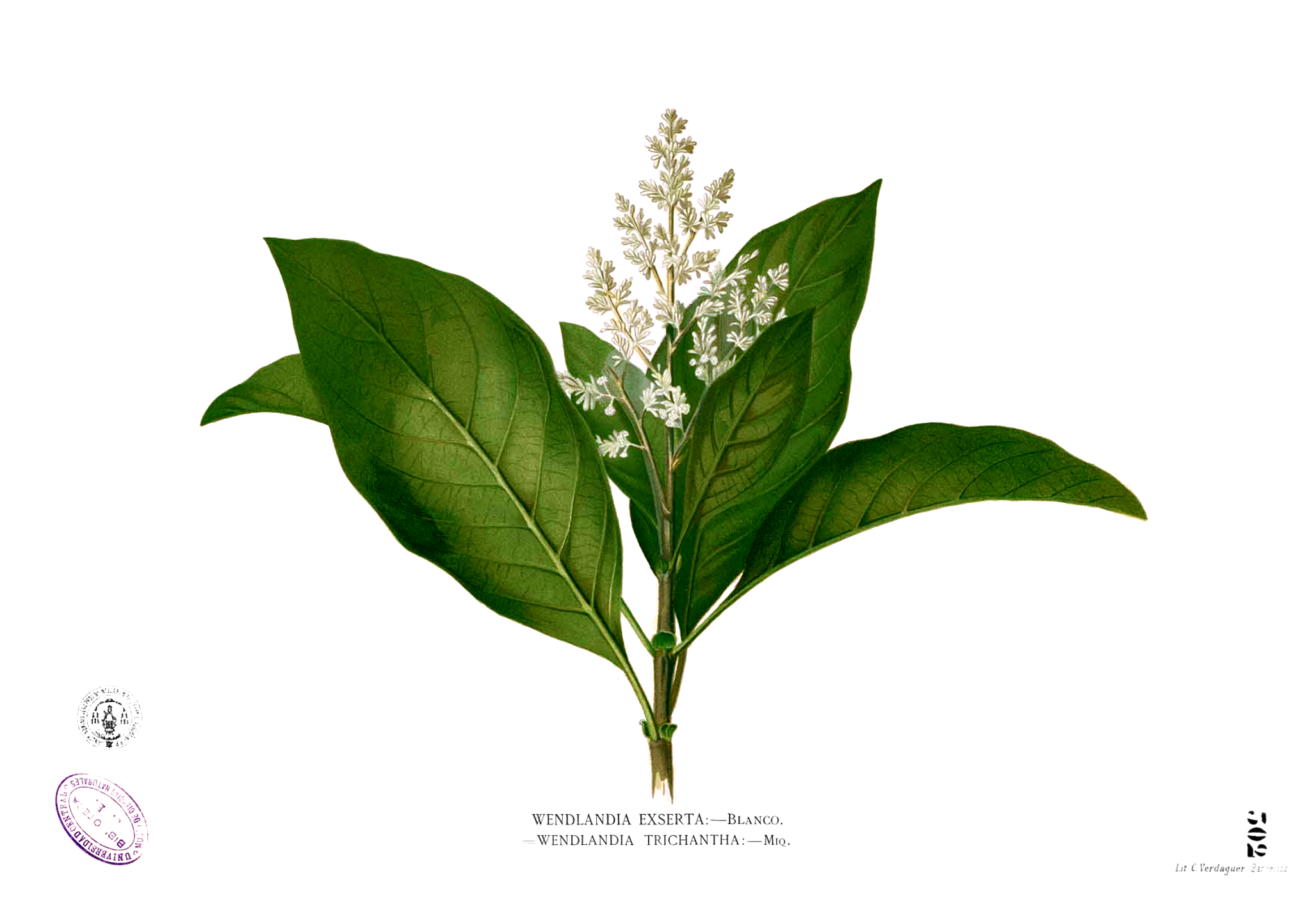
- Wendlandia luzoniensis

Scientific classification
- Kingdom: Plantae
- Clade: Tracheophytes
- Clade: Angiosperms
- Clade: Eudicots
- Clade: Asterids
- Order: Gentianales
- Family: Rubiaceae
- Subfamily: Ixoroideae
- Tribe: Gardenieae
- Genus: Wendlandia; Bartl. ex DC.

Synonyms
- Katoutheka Adans.; Sestinia Boiss. & Hohen.

= Wendlandia =

Genus of flowering plants

Wendlandia is a genus of flowering plants in the family Rubiaceae. It is found in northeastern tropical Africa, and from tropical and subtropical Asia to Queensland. The genus is named in honour of Johann Christoph Wendland (1755–1828) or his son Heinrich Wendland (1791-1869).

== Species ==
- Wendlandia aberrans F.C.How
- Wendlandia acuminata Cowan
- Wendlandia amocana Cowan
- Wendlandia andamanica Cowan
- Wendlandia angustifolia Wight ex Hook.f.
- Wendlandia appendiculata Wall. ex Hook.f.
- Wendlandia arabica Deflers
- Wendlandia arborescens Cowan
- Wendlandia augustini Cowan
- Wendlandia basistaminea F.Muell.
- Wendlandia bicuspidata Wight & Arn.
- Wendlandia bouvardioides Hutch.
- Wendlandia brachyantha Merr.
- Wendlandia brevipaniculata W.C.Chen
- Wendlandia brevituba Chun & F.C.How ex W.C.Chen
- Wendlandia buddleacea F.Muell.
- Wendlandia budleioides Wall. ex Wight & Arn.
- Wendlandia burkillii Cowan
- Wendlandia cambodiana Pit.
- Wendlandia cavaleriei H.Lév.
- Wendlandia connata C.T.White
- Wendlandia coriacea (Wall.) DC.
- Wendlandia dasythyrsa Miq.
- Wendlandia densiflora (Blume) DC.
- Wendlandia erythroxylon Cowan
- Wendlandia ferruginea Pierre ex Pit.
- Wendlandia formosana Cowan
- Wendlandia fulva Cowan
- Wendlandia gamblei Cowan
- Wendlandia glabrata DC.
- Wendlandia glomerulata Kurz
- Wendlandia guangdongensis W.C.Chen
- Wendlandia heyneana Wall. ex Wight & Arn.
- Wendlandia heynei (Schult.) Santapau & Merchant
- Wendlandia inclusa C.T.White
- Wendlandia jingdongensis W.C.Chen
- Wendlandia junghuhniana Miq.
- Wendlandia lauterbachii Valeton
- Wendlandia laxa S.K.Wu ex W.C.Chen
- Wendlandia ligustrina Wall. ex G.Don
- Wendlandia ligustroides (Boiss. & Hohen.) Blakelock
- Wendlandia litseifolia F.C.How
- Wendlandia longidens (Hance) Hutch.
- Wendlandia longipedicellata F.C.Chow
- Wendlandia luzoniensis DC.
- Wendlandia merrilliana Cowan
- Wendlandia myriantha F.C.Chow
- Wendlandia nervosa Merr.
- Wendlandia nitens Wall. ex G.Don
- Wendlandia nobilis Geddes
- Wendlandia oligantha W.C.Chen
- Wendlandia ovata Merr.
- Wendlandia paedicalyx Pit.
- Wendlandia paniculata (Roxb.) DC.
- Wendlandia parviflora W.C.Chen
- Wendlandia pendula (Wall.) DC.
- Wendlandia philippinensis Cowan
- Wendlandia pingpienensis F.C.Chow
- Wendlandia proxima (D.Don) DC.
- Wendlandia psychotrioides (F.Muell.) F.Muell.
- Wendlandia puberula DC.
- Wendlandia pubigera W.C.Chen
- Wendlandia salicifolia Franch.
- Wendlandia scabra Kurz
- Wendlandia sericea W.C.Chen
- Wendlandia sibuyanensis Cowan
- Wendlandia sikkimensis Cowan
- Wendlandia speciosa Cowan
- Wendlandia subalpina W.W.Sm.
- Wendlandia syringoides (Cowan) Cowan
- Wendlandia ternifolia Cowan
- Wendlandia teysmanniana Miq.
- Wendlandia thorelii Pit.
- Wendlandia thyrsoidea (Roth) Steud.
- Wendlandia tinctoria (Roxb.) DC.
- Wendlandia tombuyukonensis Suzana
- Wendlandia tonkiniana Pit.
- Wendlandia urceolata C.T.White
- Wendlandia uvariifolia Hance
- Wendlandia villosa W.C.Chen
- Wendlandia wallichii Wight & Arn.
- Wendlandia warburgii Merr.
