= Wendlandia arabica =

Conservation status
- Near Threatened (IUCN 2.3)

Scientific classification
- Kingdom: Plantae
- Clade: Tracheophytes
- Clade: Angiosperms
- Clade: Eudicots
- Clade: Asterids
- Order: Gentianales
- Family: Rubiaceae
- Genus: Wendlandia
- Species: W. arabica

Binomial name
- Wendlandia arabica DC.

Species of plant

Wendlandia arabica is a species of plant in the family Rubiaceae. It is found in Somalia and Yemen, and is threatened by habitat loss.
