= Augusta vitiensis =

Scientific classification
- Kingdom: Plantae
- Clade: Tracheophytes
- Clade: Angiosperms
- Clade: Eudicots
- Clade: Asterids
- Order: Gentianales
- Family: Rubiaceae
- Genus: Augusta
- Species: A. vitiensis

Binomial name
- Augusta vitiensis (Seem.) J.H.Kirkbr.

Synonyms
- Lindenia vitiensis Semble.

Species of plant

Augusta rivalis is a plant species native to Fiji.
