= Wendlandia andamanica =

Conservation status
- Critically Endangered (IUCN 2.3)

Scientific classification
- Kingdom: Plantae
- Clade: Tracheophytes
- Clade: Angiosperms
- Clade: Eudicots
- Clade: Asterids
- Order: Gentianales
- Family: Rubiaceae
- Genus: Wendlandia
- Species: W. andamanica

Binomial name
- Wendlandia andamanica Cowan

Species of plant

Wendlandia andamanica is a species of plant in the family Rubiaceae. It is endemic to the Andaman Islands. It is threatened by habitat loss.
