= Guihaiothamnus =

Scientific classification
- Kingdom: Plantae
- Clade: Tracheophytes
- Clade: Angiosperms
- Clade: Eudicots
- Clade: Asterids
- Order: Gentianales
- Family: Rubiaceae
- Subfamily: Ixoroideae
- Tribe: Augusteae
- Genus: Guihaiothamnus; H.S.Lo
- Species: G. acaulis

Binomial name
- Guihaiothamnus acaulis H.S.Lo

Genus of plants

Guihaiothamnus is a monotypic genus of flowering plants in the family Rubiaceae. The genus contains only one species, viz. Guihaiothamnus acaulis, which is only found in Rongshui County in southern China.
