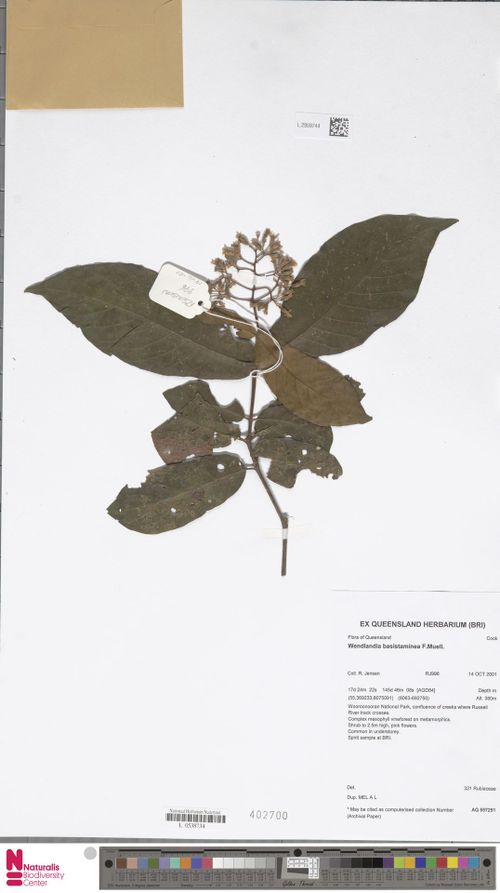
- Specimen (Naturalis Biodiversity Center L.2959744) collected at Russell River, QLD

Conservation status
- Least Concern (NCA)

Scientific classification
- Kingdom: Plantae
- Clade: Embryophytes
- Clade: Tracheophytes
- Clade: Spermatophytes
- Clade: Angiosperms
- Clade: Eudicots
- Clade: Asterids
- Order: Gentianales
- Family: Rubiaceae
- Genus: Wendlandia
- Species: W. basistaminea

Binomial name
- Wendlandia basistaminea F.Muell.

= Wendlandia basistaminea =

Species of flowering plant

Wendlandia basistaminea is a member of the Rubiaceae family, endemic to Queensland. It was first described by Ferdinand von Mueller in 1892.

Mueller described the plant from a specimen collected by Stephen Johnson on the Russell River in Queensland.

Branchlets appressedly almost sericiously pubescent; leaves on short petioles or almost sessile, chartaceous, mostly ovate-lanceolar, short-acuminate, at the base rounded-blunt, above nearly glabrous, beneath particularly along the costules and venules beset with very short hairlets; stipules almost deltoid, incised at the apex, soon deciduous; panicles with cymous or fasciculate flowers, appressedly short-pubescent; lobes of the calyx deltoid-semilanceolar; corolla-tube about thrice as long as the calyx-lobes, sparingly puberulous inside, slightly constricted at the upper end; corolla-lobes nearly glabrous, not much shorter than the tube; stamens fixed close to the base of the corolla and nearly as long as its tube, completely enclosed, as well as the style glabrous; dehiscence of fruit more readily loculicidal than septicidal; seeds minute, ovate, outside brown and reticular-rough. Leaves simply opposite, to 5 inches long, to 134 inches broad, flat, paler and often brownish beneath. Panicle terminal, inclusive.
