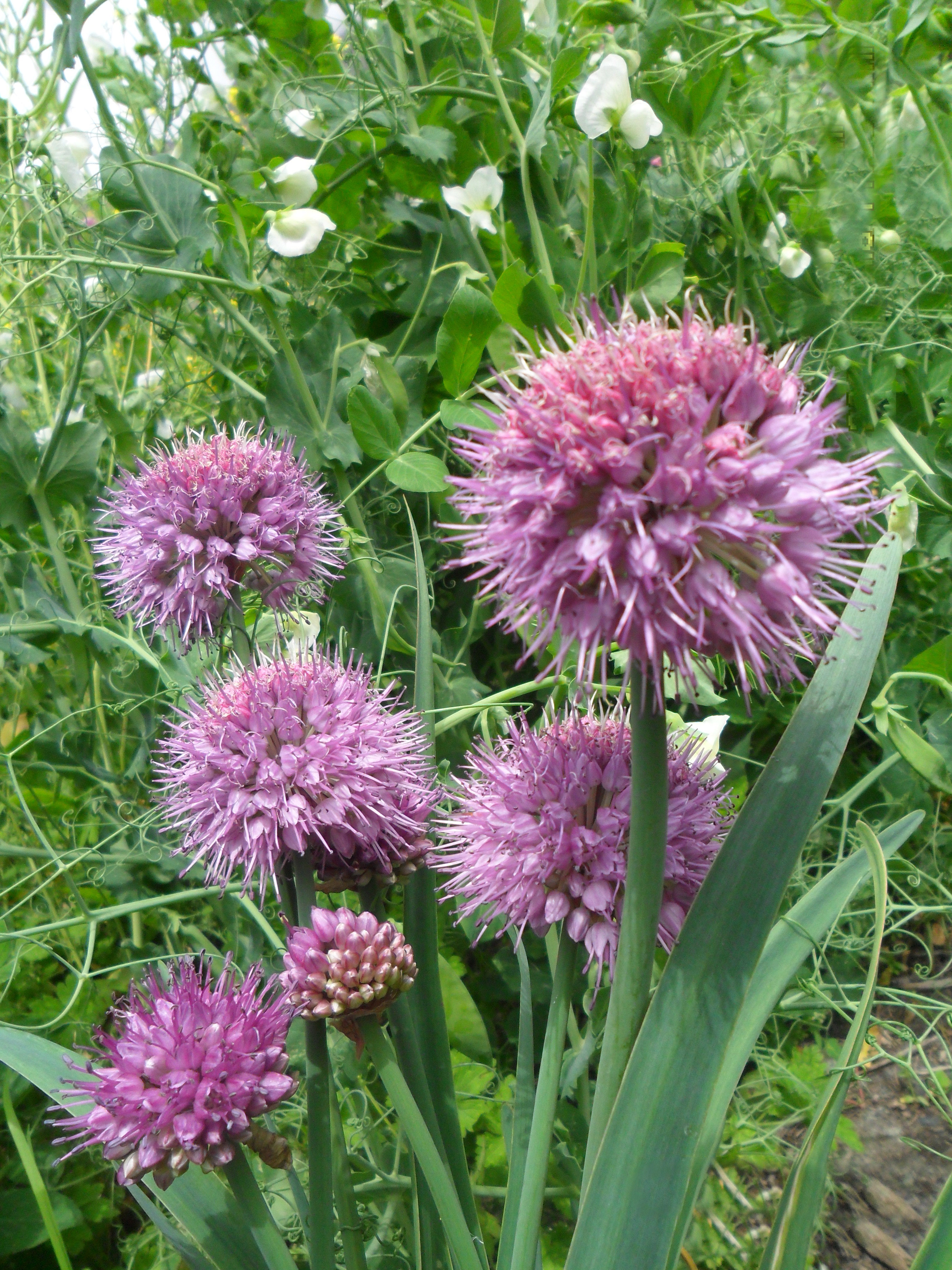

Scientific classification
- Kingdom: Plantae
- Clade: Embryophytes
- Clade: Tracheophytes
- Clade: Spermatophytes
- Clade: Angiosperms
- Clade: Monocots
- Order: Asparagales
- Family: Amaryllidaceae
- Subfamily: Allioideae
- Genus: Allium
- Species: A. carolinianum

Binomial name
- Allium carolinianum DC. in Red.

Synonyms
- Allium aitchisonii Boiss.; Allium obtusifolium Klotzsch; Allium platyspathum var. falcatum Regel; Allium platystylum Regel; Allium polyphyllum Kar. & Kir.; Allium polyphyllum var. nudicaule Regel; Allium thomsonii Baker

= Allium carolinianum =

镰叶韭 lian ye jiu Лук каролинский

Species of flowering plant

Allium carolinianum is a species of onions native to central and southern Asia (Xinjiang, Xizang (Tibet), Afghanistan, Bhutan, India, Kazakhstan, Kyrgyzstan, Nepal, Pakistan, Tajikistan, Uzbekistan). It grows in sunlit slopes at elevations of 3000–5000 m.

Allium carolinianum produces egg-shaped bulbs up to 25 mm across. Scapes are round in cross-section, up to 60 cm tall. Leaves are narrow, flat, shorter than the scape. Umbel is round, with many white, red or purplish flowers.
