= Philipp Johann Ferdinand Schur =

German-Austrian pharmacist and botanist

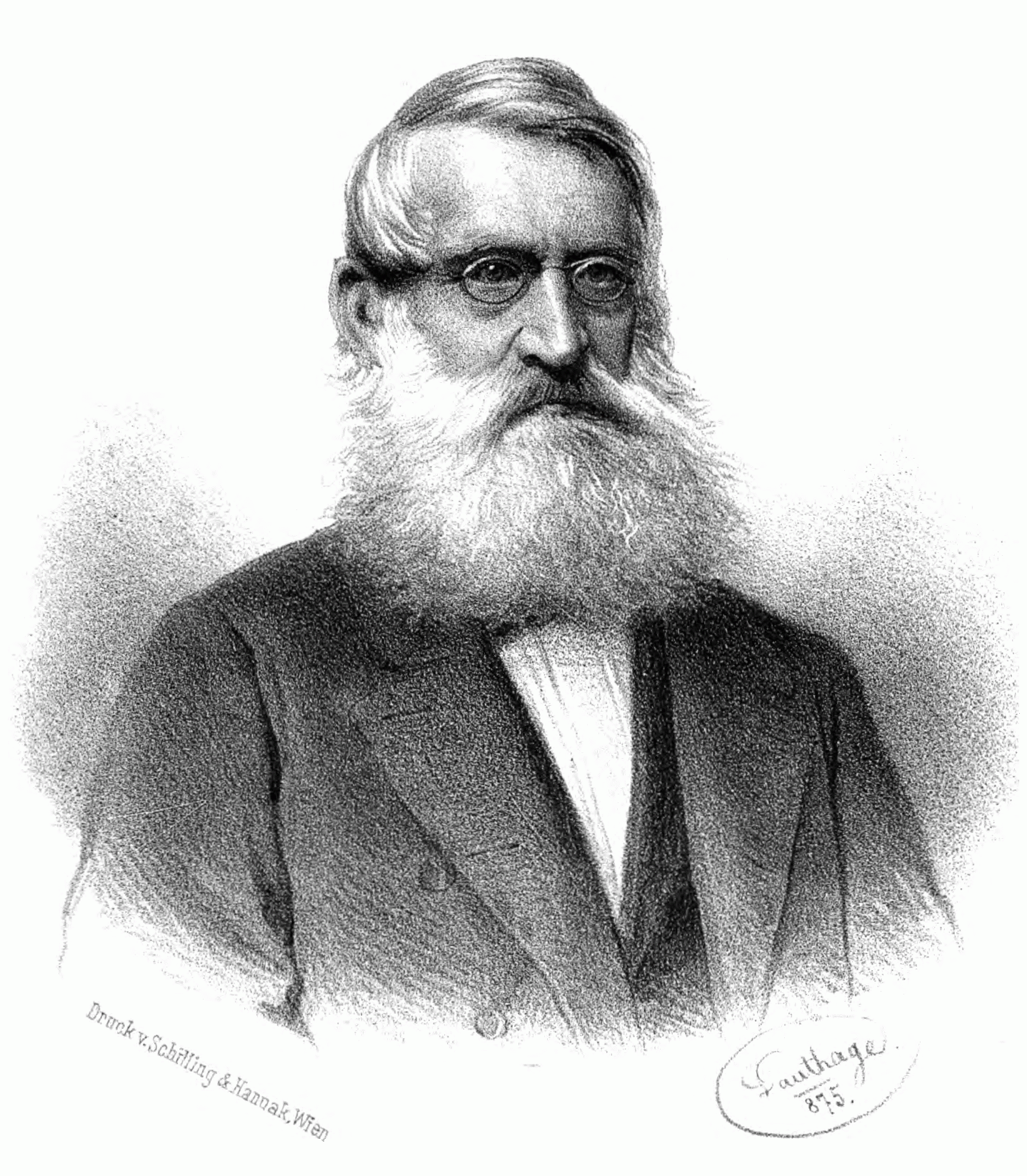
Philipp Johann Ferdinand Schur in 1875

Philipp Johann Ferdinand Schur (February 18, 1799 – May 27, 1878) was a German-Austrian pharmacist and botanist born in Königsberg.

He obtained his education in Königsberg and Berlin, later serving as a director of a chemical factory in Liesing (Vienna). Following a stint as a school teacher in Kronstadt (1853–54), he worked as a private scientist in Vienna (1854–70), Brunn and Bielitz.

Schur was author of the highly regarded Enumeratio plantarum Transsilvaniae, a work that was a result of nine years of botanical research in Transylvania. Another noted work on Transylvanian flora of his was Sertum florae Transsilvaniae (1853).

Taxa with the specific epithet of schurii commemorate his name.
