= Alexander von Schrenk =

Baltic German naturalist

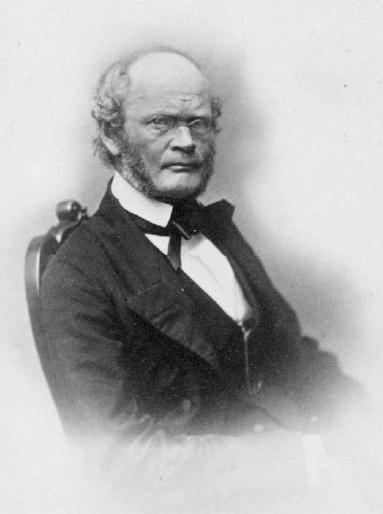
Alexander von Schrenk

Alexander Gustav von Schrenk (4 February 1816 – 25 June 1876) was a Baltic German-Russian naturalist born near Tula in what was then the Russian Empire. He was a brother to zoologist Leopold von Schrenck (1826–1894).

From 1834 to 1837, he studied sciences at the Imperial University of Dorpat (Tartu), later spending several years as an assistant at the botanical garden in St. Petersburg. He was habilitated for mineralogy at Dorpat, where from 1849 he served as a lecturer. From 1858 he spent the next ten years at his wife's manor in Pühajärve (Heiligensee), Livonia, returning to Dorpat in 1868, where he died several years later.

Known for his expeditions to Central Asia and northern Russia, he was the author of Reise nach dem Nordosten des europäischen Rußlands, durch die Tundren der Samojeden, zum arktischen Uralgebirge, a two-volume work involving a journey to the Arctic that was later translated into English. While traveling in the historic region of Dzhungaria in Central Asia, he identified numerous new species of plants and insects.

Schrenk was co-founder of the Dorpater Naturforschergesellschaft (Tartu Naturalists' Society).

The species Picea schrenkiana (Schrenk's spruce), in 1841, and Tulipa schrenkii (Schrenck's tulip, now a synonym of Tulipa suaveolens) are named in his honor. Also in 1841, botanists Fisch. and C.A.Mey. published Schrenkia, which is a genus of flowering plants from Central Asia belonging to the family Apiaceae and named in his honour.

== Selected works ==
- Bericht über eine im jahre 1840 in die östliche Dsungarische Kirgisensteppe unternommene reise - Report on a trip undertaken in the eastern Dzungarian Kirghiz Steppe in the year 1840.
- Reise nach dem Balchasch und auf dem Tarbagatai, 1841 - Journey to the Balkhash and the Tarbagatai.
- Reise nach dem Nordosten des europäischen Rußlands, durch die Tundren der Samojeden, zum arktischen Uralgebirge, two volumes, 1848; translated into English in 1964 as "Journey to the Northeast of European Russia, through the Tundras of the Samoyeds, to the Arctic Ural Mountains".
- Orographisch-geognostische Uebersicht des Uralgebirges im hohen Norden, 1849 - Orographic-geognostic overview of the Ural Mountains in the far north.
- Sitzungsberichte der naturforscher-gesellschaft zu Dorpat in den jahren 1853 bis 1860 - Proceedings of the Dorpat naturalist society in the years 1853–1860.

== See also ==
- List of Baltic German Scientists
