= Rudolph Friedrich Hohenacker =

Swiss missionary and botanist

Rudolph Friedrich Hohenacker (1798 – 14 November 1874) was a Swiss missionary and botanist born in Zürich.

In the 1820s he was assigned to the Swabian colony of Helenendorf in the Transcaucasus, where he served as a doctor and missionary. Eventually, his main focus involved collecting plants from the region. In 1841 he returned to Switzerland, where he took up residence in Basel. Shortly afterwards he relocated to Esslingen, Germany (1842–1858), and in 1858 moved to the town of Kirchheim unter Teck.

Following his return from the Transcaucasus, Hohenacker earned his living selling biological specimens of other collectors sorted in exsiccatae and exsiccata-like series. Around 40 series edited by him are known, among many others Th. Kotschy. Pl. Alepp. Kurd. Moss. Ed. Hohenacker. 1843. with specimens collected by Theodor Kotschy, Riedel pl. Brasiliae. Ed. R. F. Hohenacker with specimens collected by Ludwig Riedel and H. Zollinger pl. Javae et Bali. Ed. Hohenacker with specimens collected by Heinrich Zollinger.. All are listed with bibliographic data and examplary labels in IndExs – Index of Exsiccatae. Hohenacker also contributed specimens to the German scientific society Unio Itineraria for plant exchange until 1842. He was the author of Enumeratio Plantarum quas in itinere per provinciam Talysch collegit.

In 1836 the botanical genus Hohenackeria (family Apiaceae) was named after him by Carl Anton von Meyer and Friedrich Ernst Ludwig von Fischer.

Hohenacker is also commemorated in the scientific name of the Transcaucasian ratsnake, Zamenis hohenackeri, and the Caucasian beech Fagus hohenackeriana.
