= Friedrich Ernst Ludwig von Fischer =

Russian botanist (1782–1854)

Friedrich Ernst Ludwig Fischer
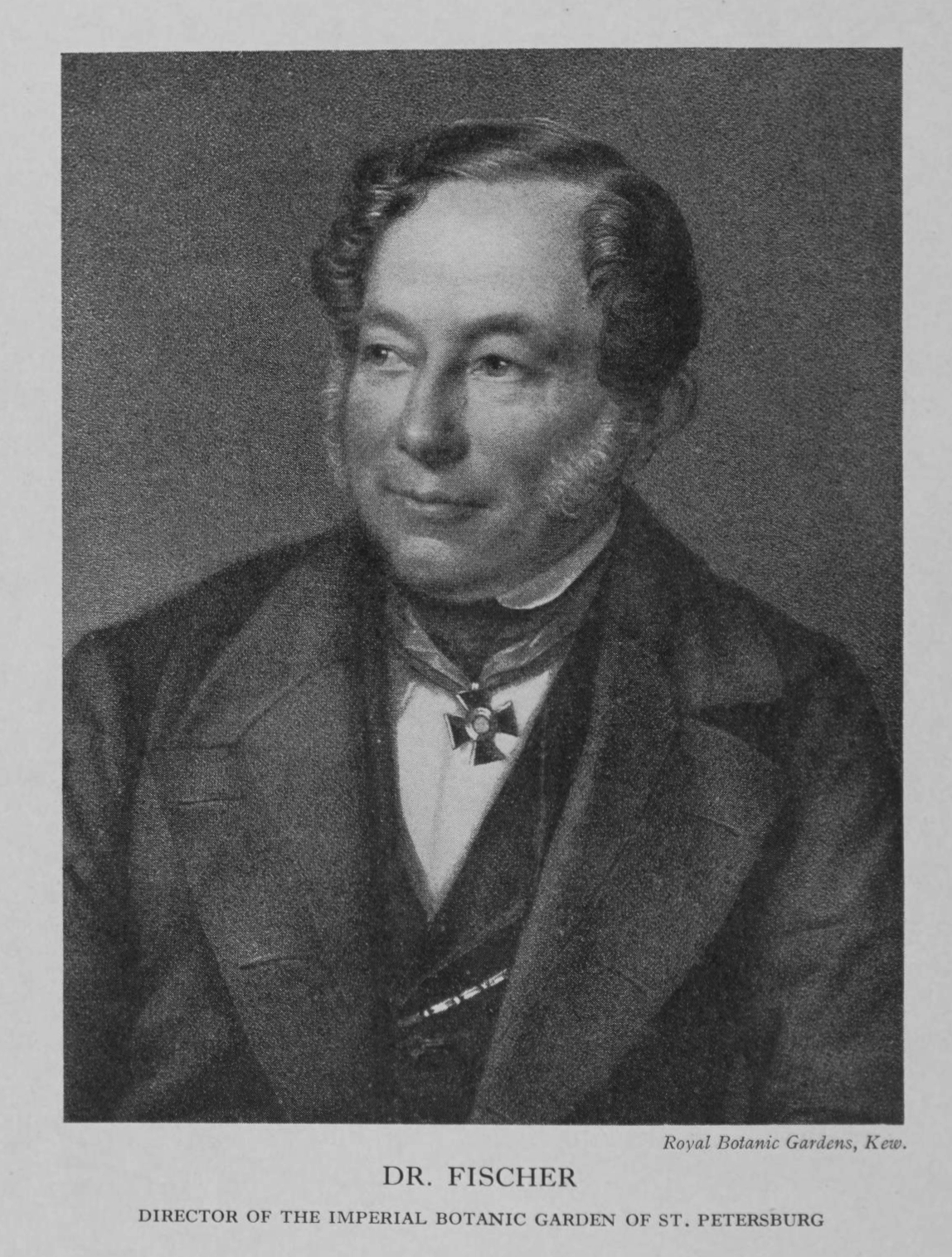
- Around 1845
- Born: 20 February 1782; Holy Roman Empire
- Died: 17 June 1854 (aged 72)
- Education: University of Halle
- Scientific career
- Author abbrev. (botany): Fisch.

Friedrich Ernst Ludwig Fischer (20 February 1782, Halberstadt – 17 June 1854) was a Russian botanist, born in the Holy Roman Empire. He was director of the St Petersburg botanical garden from 1823 to 1850. He was conferred personal nobility by the Tsar Nicholas I in 1833 from which date he went by Friedrich Ernst von Ludwig Fischer. The genus Fischeria is named in his honour.

== Life and work ==
Fischer was born in Halberstadt, Harz, where his father, Gottlob Nathanael Fischer, was a preacher at the Church of the Hospital of the Holy Spirit. His mother Anna Auguste Heyer was the daughter of a headmaster. He was tutored at home by his father before going to the University of Halle. His father died in 1800 on March 20 and his mother died shortly after on April 7. He initially went to study theology but apparently changed and received a medical degree in 1804 with a dissertation under Kurt Sprengel (1766–1833) titled Specimen de Vegetabilium imprimis Filicum propagione [Examples regarding the propagation of plants, particularly ferns]. He was not interested in practicing medicine and took up a position to manage the botanical garden of Count Alexei Razumowsky's (1748–1822) in Gorenki (near Moscow). In 1808 he produced a catalogue of plants of the garden. The genus Fischeria was created by Augustus de Candolle in his honour in 1813. In 1821 he toured Europe and England meeting a number of botanists. By the time he returned his employer had passed away and in 1823, he was appointed director of the imperial botanical garden in St. Petersburg by Alexander I. In 1830, he married Helene von Struve, the daughter of an officer in Hamburg. He made use of the material from the Gorenski garden to develop the new garden and also established a herbarium and library. He was also able to plan numerous scientific collecting expeditions into the interior of Russia. In 1831 he published Monographia Zygophyllearum. He worked with Carl Anton von Meyer cataloguing plants in the garden. Plants were acquired from a wide range of contacts that Fischer developed including numerous travellers like Baron Karwinsky who brought plants from Mexico. A large palm-house was built for new tropical plants in 1845 and questions raised about it led to his resignation. There were nearly 12,000 species of plants under cultivation. He was succeeded by Carl Anton von Meyer. During his final years, he served as a medical councillor for the Ministry of the Interior.

In 1833 Fischer was awarded the Order of St Vladimir, 3rd class, and 2nd class of the Order of St. Anna which conferred personal nobility and he thereafter called himself "von Fischer". He was a foreign member of the Linnean Society from 1820, the Leopoldina Academy from 1837 under the name "Aiton". In 1815, he was elected a corresponding member of the Royal Swedish Academy of Sciences. In 1841, his status was changed to that of foreign member. He died in St. Petersburg.

== Selected works ==
- Catalogue du Jardin des plantes de S.E. Monsieur le comte Alexis de Razoumoffsky ... à Gorenki près de Moscou, 1808–1812.
- Beitrag zur botanischen Systematik, die Existenz der Monocotyledoneen und dem Polycotyledoneen betreffend, 1812 - Contributions to plant systematics, the existence of Monocotyledon, etc.
- Enumeratio plantarum novarum a CI. Schrenk lectarum, 1841 (with Carl Anton von Meyer).
- Jardin de Saint-Pétersbourg, 1846. (Sertum Petropolitanum Seu Icones Et Descriptiones Plantarum Quæ in Horto Botanico ..., 1846 (with Carl Anton von Meyer).

== Sources ==
- "Фишер, Федор Богданович" . Brockhaus and Efron Encyclopedic Dictionary (in Russian). 1906.
