= Carl Anton von Meyer =

Russian botanist and explorer (1795–1855)

Carl Anton von Meyer (Russian: Карл Анто́нович фон Ме́йер, romanized: Karl Antonovich von Meyer; 1 April 1795 – 24 February 1855) was a Russian botanist and explorer of German descent.

== Life ==
Meyer was born in Vitebsk. He received his education at the Imperial University of Dorpat (1813–1814) as a student of Karl Friedrich von Ledebour, with whom he later embarked on a scientific journey to the Crimea (1818). In 1826, with Ledebour and Alexander G. von Bunge, he took part in an expedition to the Altay Mountains and the Kazakh Steppe (Kazakhstan). Plants collected on the trip formed the basis of "Flora Altaica" (four volumes issued between 1829 and 1833).

In 1835, he began work as a botanist for the Russian Academy of Sciences in Saint Petersburg, where he conducted research with Friedrich Ernst Ludwig von Fischer. In 1844, he succeeded Carl Bernhard von Trinius as director of the academy's botanical museum, and in 1850 replaced Fischer as head of the imperial botanical garden. Meyer was the only botanist to have held both positions, being in charge of the garden and museum simultaneously until his death in Saint Petersburg in 1855.

== Publications ==
Among his written works were treatises on the plant families Cruciferae and Polygonaceae. The following are a few of his principal works:

- Enumeratio plantarum novarum a cl. Schrenk lectarum (with Friedrich Ernst Ludwig von Fischer), 1841–1842.
- Flora Altaica; scripsit Carolus Fridericus a Ledebour, adiutoribus Car. Ant. Meyer et Al. a Bunge. (with Karl Friedrich von Ledebour and Alexander Georg von Bunge), 1829–1833.
- Versuch einer Monographie der Gattung Ephedra: durch Abbildungen erläutert, 1846.

== See also ==
- Category:Taxa named by Carl Anton von Meyer

== Sources ==
- "Мейер, Карл Антонович" . Brockhaus and Efron Encyclopedic Dictionary (in Russian). 1906.
