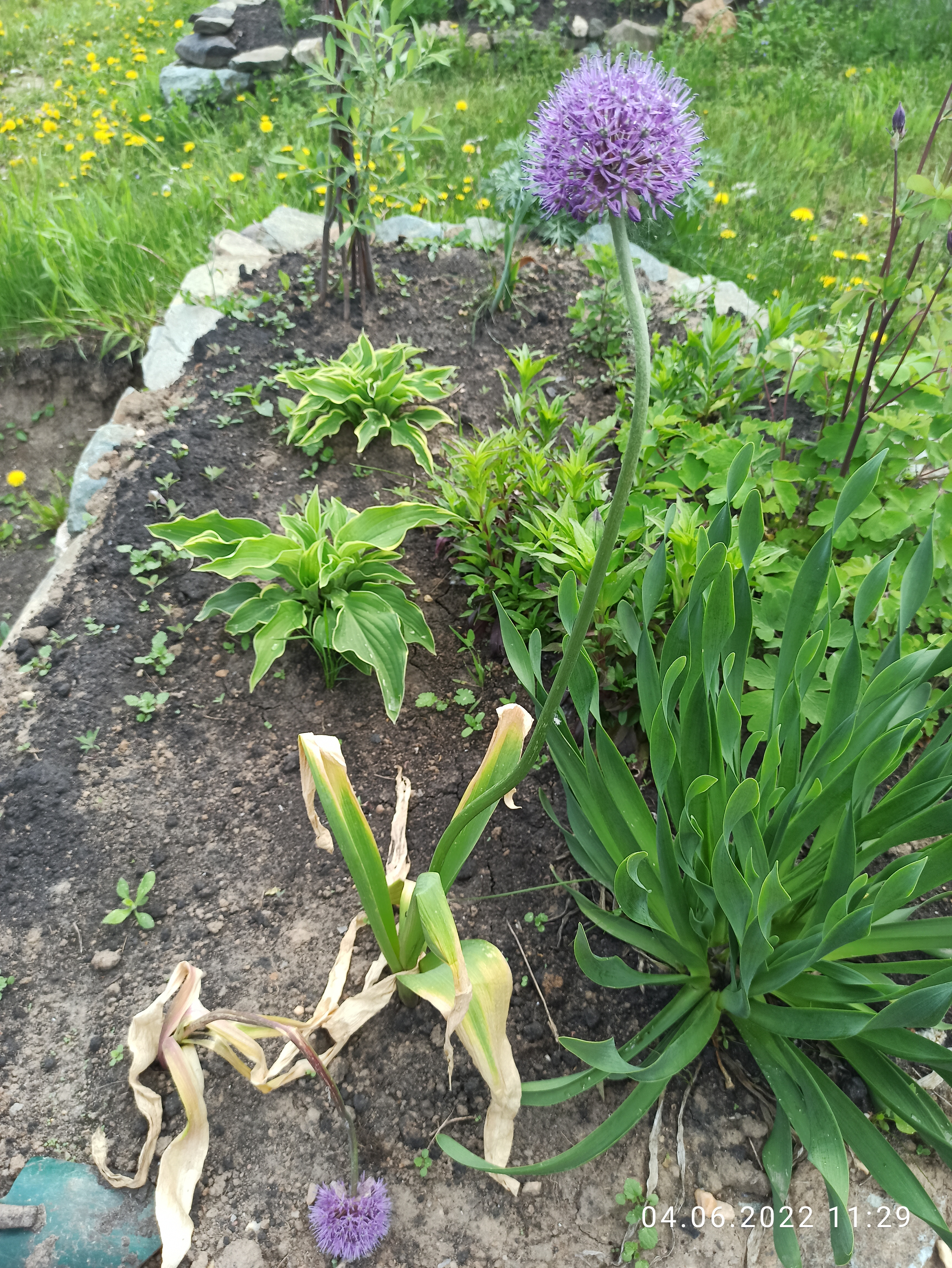

Scientific classification
- Kingdom: Plantae
- Clade: Embryophytes
- Clade: Tracheophytes
- Clade: Spermatophytes
- Clade: Angiosperms
- Clade: Monocots
- Order: Asparagales
- Family: Amaryllidaceae
- Subfamily: Allioideae
- Genus: Allium
- Subgenus: Allium subg. Melanocrommyum
- Species: A. suworowii

Binomial name
- Allium suworowii Regel

= Allium suworowii =

Species of flowering plant

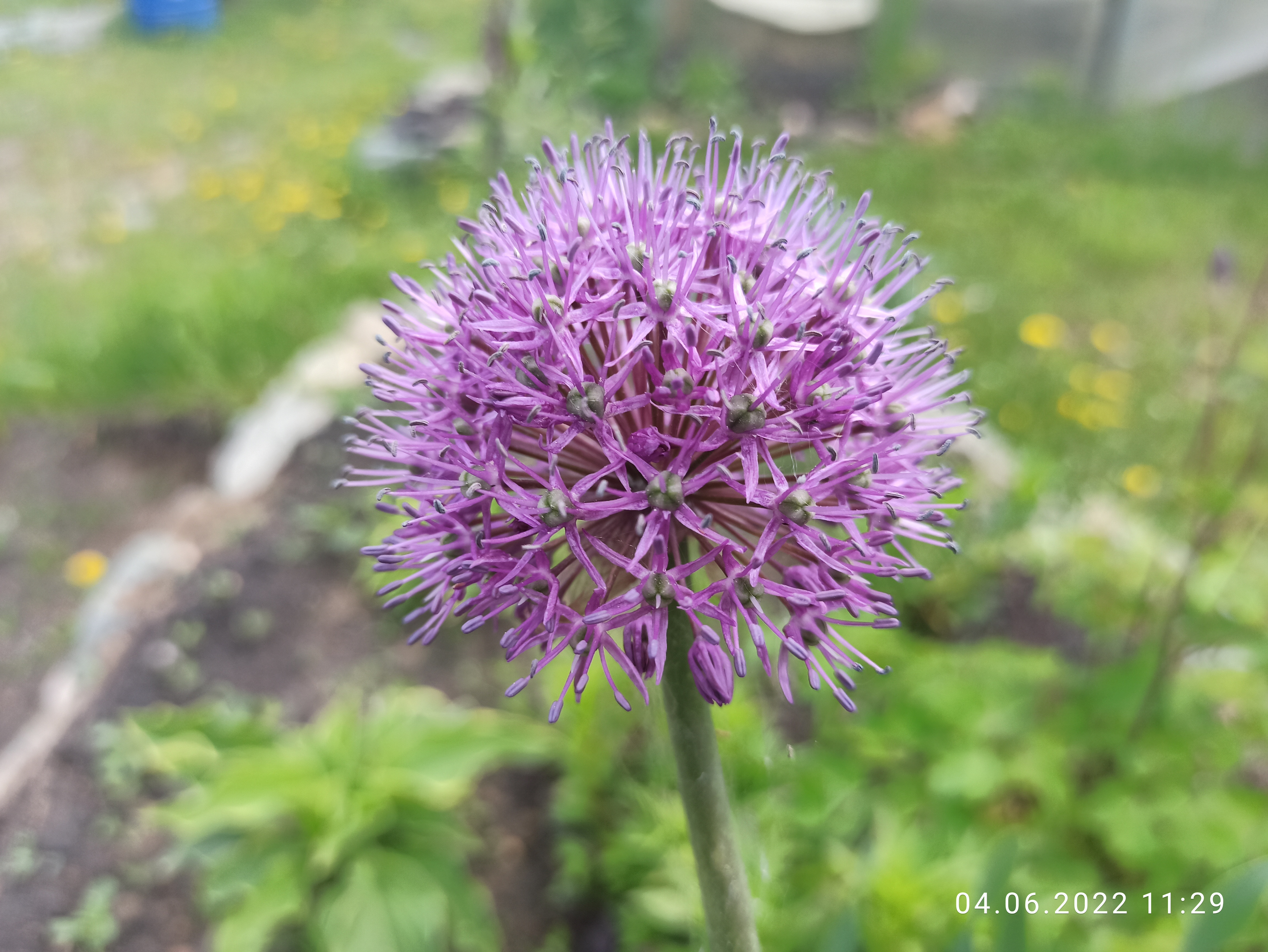
Allium suworowii

Allium suworowii is a species of onion native to Afghanistan and Central Asia. It is a widely distributed and highly genetically variable species. It has gained the Royal Horticultural Society's Award of Garden Merit as an ornamental.
