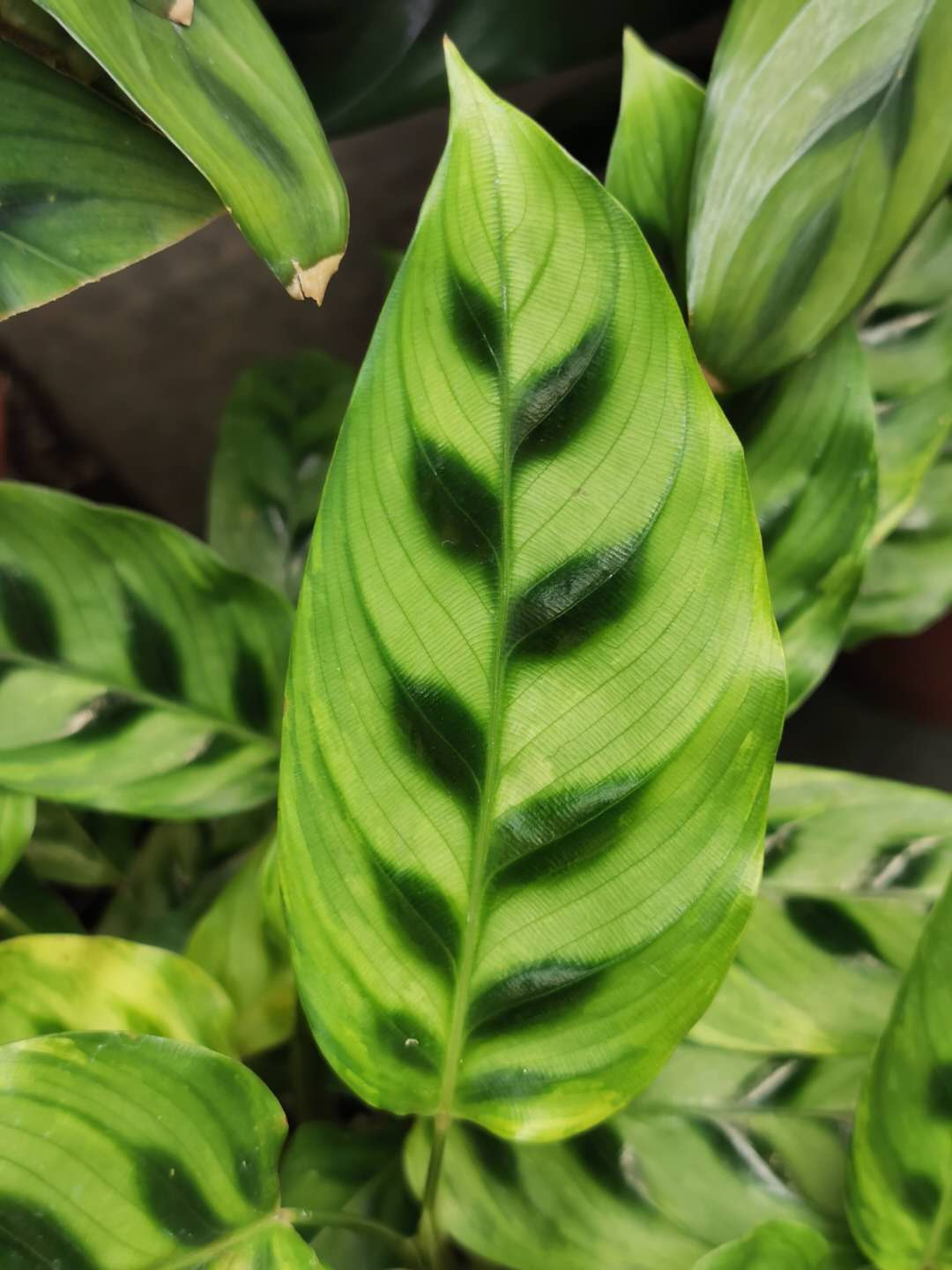

Scientific classification
- Kingdom: Plantae
- Clade: Embryophytes
- Clade: Tracheophytes
- Clade: Spermatophytes
- Clade: Angiosperms
- Clade: Monocots
- Clade: Commelinids
- Order: Zingiberales
- Family: Marantaceae
- Genus: Goeppertia
- Species: G. concinna

Binomial name
- Goeppertia concinna (W.Bull) Borchs. & S.Suárez

Synonyms
- List: Calathea chantrieri (André) L.H.Bailey & Raffill; Calathea concinna (W.Bull) K.Schum.; Calathea leopardina (W.Bull) Regel; Calathea leopardina var. concinna (W.Bull) Regel; Maranta chantrieri André; Maranta concinna W.Bull; Maranta leopardina W.Bull; Phyllodes leopardina (W.Bull) Kuntze

= Goeppertia concinna =

Species of plant

Goeppertia concinna (syn. Calathea concinna, Calathea leopardina) is a species of flowering plant from the genus Goeppertia in the family Marantaceae. It is native to Espírito Santo and Minas Gerais in southeastern Brazil. A perennial shrub of the wet tropics, it has found use as a houseplant.

== Description ==
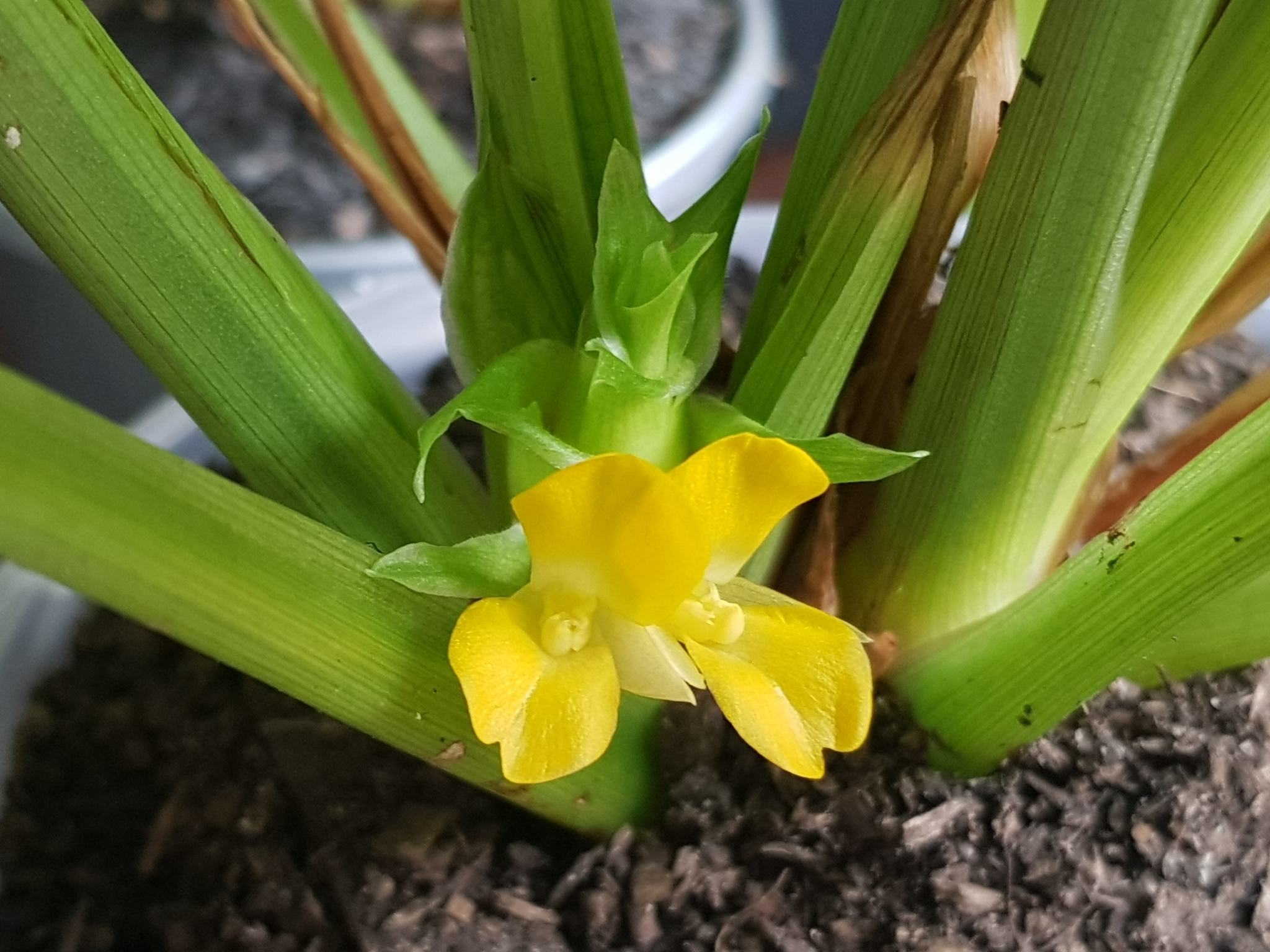
Inflorescence of Goeppertia concinna

Goeppertia concinna is a small sized plant. It has pointy, light green leaves, long, green petioles and a small, green pulvinus. It has a pattern on the upper side of the leaf, which consists of a few, pointy dark green spots along the middle vein. The inflorescence of G.concinna is made of multiple bracts on a very short peduncle. The bracts are pointy and green and the flowers are bright yellow.

== Taxonomy ==
In 2012, Mariana Saka, stated that the old type of Calathea leopardina was now used for Goeppertia concinna as Regel considered Calathea leopardina only a variety of Calathea concinna (Calathea leopardina var.concinna). The only differentiation Regel noticed between the two was the shape of the leaves (elliptic vs elliptic lanceolate).

== Cultivation ==
In cultivation, there is a species that is often misnamed as Goeppertia concinna, which is a Goeppertia species called in the trade "Freddie". Those plants are a different species as Goeppertia concinna. The real G. concinna is more often sold as Goeppertia leopardina (or Calathea leopardina).
