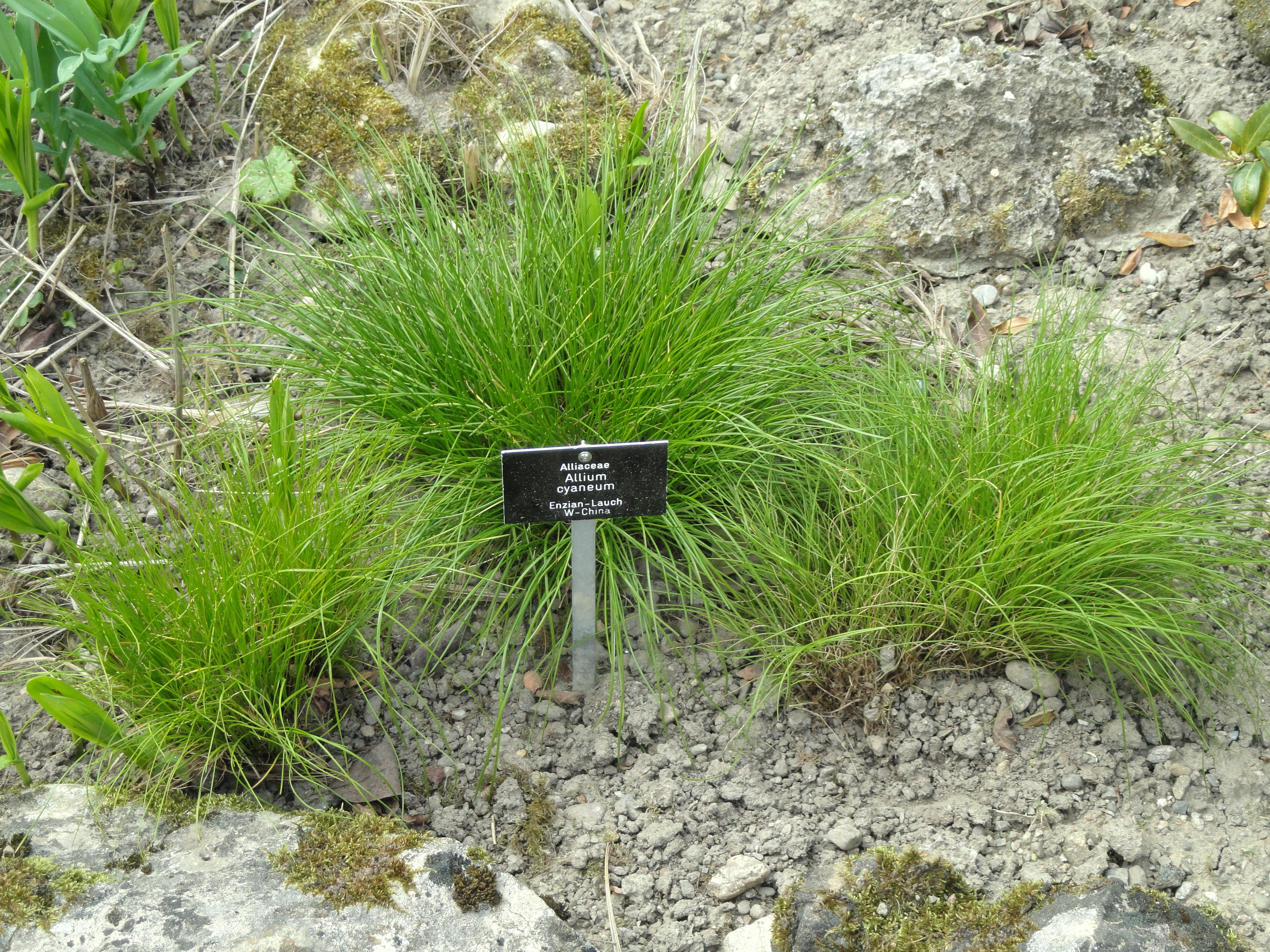
- A. cyaneum

Scientific classification
- Kingdom: Plantae
- Clade: Tracheophytes
- Clade: Angiosperms
- Clade: Monocots
- Order: Asparagales
- Family: Amaryllidaceae
- Subfamily: Allioideae
- Genus: Allium
- Subgenus: A. subg. Reticulatobulbosa
- Species: A. cyaneum

Binomial name
- Allium cyaneum Regel

Synonyms
- Allium hugonianum Rendle; Allium purdomii W.W.Sm.; Allium szechuanicum F.T.Wang & Tang; Allium tui F.T.Wang & Tang

= Allium cyaneum =

Species of flowering plant

Allium cyaneum, dark blue garlic, is a Chinese (天蓝韭, tian lan jiu, meaning "sky blue chive") species of onion. It prefers to grow at elevations from 2,100 to 5,000 m (6,900 to 16,400 ft) on slopes and meadows, and forest edges. It occurs in Gansu, Hubei, Ningxia, Qinghai, Shaanxi, Sichuan and Xizang (Tibet) provinces of China, and possibly in Korea. Its leaves and scapes are edible and are occasionally consumed by local peoples as a spice after drying. It has gained the Royal Horticultural Society's Award of Garden Merit, and is also considered by them as a good plant to attract pollinators.

== Description ==
Allium cyaneum has cylindrical bulbs that grow in clusters. It spreads by rhizomes. The leaves and the scapes are usually 10–30 cm (4–12 in) long, sometimes reaching 45 cm (18 in). Overall the plant typically reaches 25 cm (10 in) tall. The flowers, as its scientific and common names suggest, are blue. It flowers and fruits from August to October.
