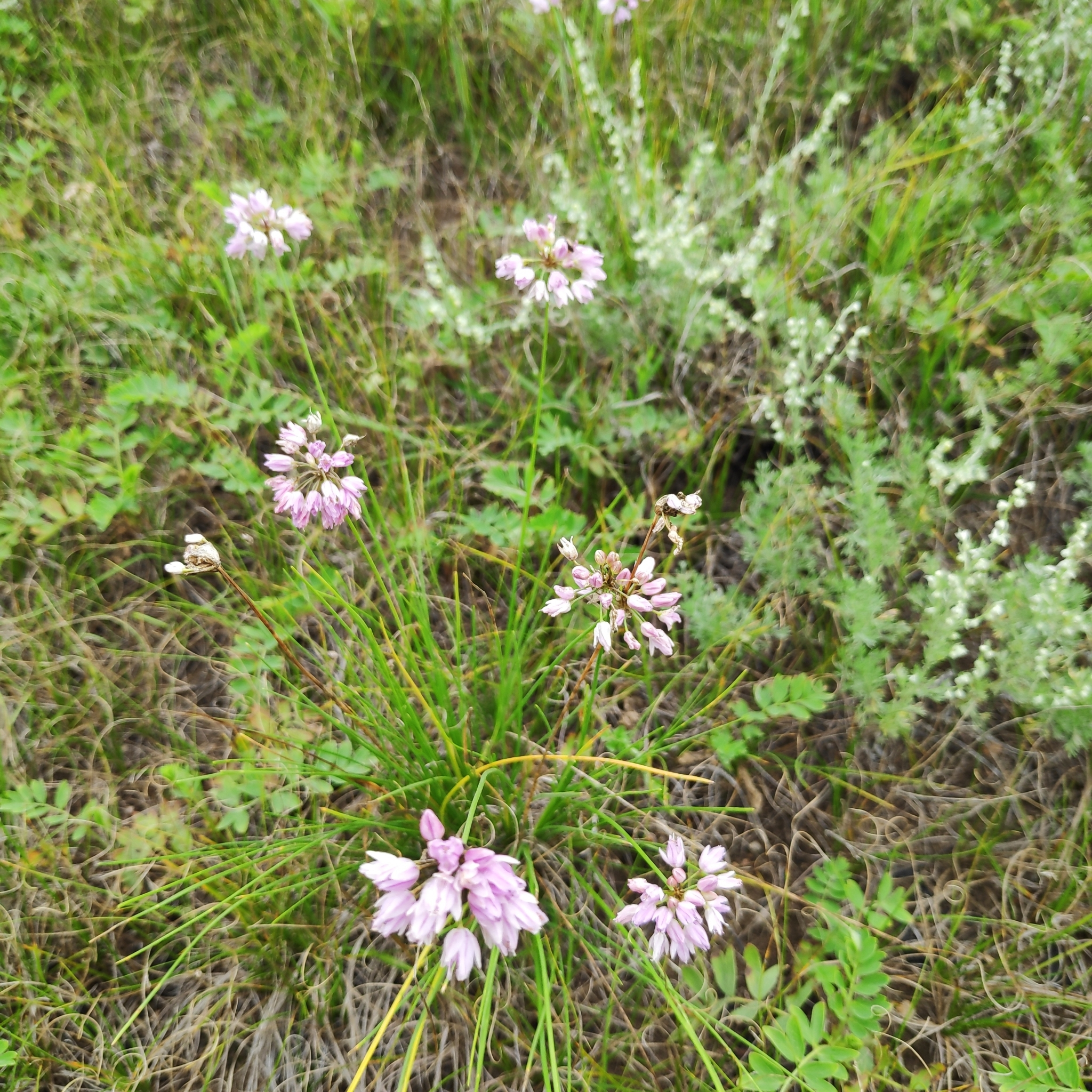

Scientific classification
- Kingdom: Plantae
- Clade: Tracheophytes
- Clade: Angiosperms
- Clade: Monocots
- Order: Asparagales
- Family: Amaryllidaceae
- Subfamily: Allioideae
- Genus: Allium
- Subgenus: A. subg. Rhizirideum
- Species: A. bidentatum

Binomial name
- Allium bidentatum Fisch. ex Prokh. & Ikonn.-Gal.

Synonyms
- Allium bidentatum var. andaense Q.S.Sun; Allium edentatum Y.P.Hsu; Allium omiostema Airy Shaw; Allium polyrhizum var. potaninii Regel

= Allium bidentatum =

Species of flowering plant

Allium bidentatum is an Asian species of plant in the amaryllis family. It is native to Mongolia, Russia (Buryatiya, Zabaykalsky Krai, Krasnoyarsk, Primorye), Kazakhstan, and northern China (Hebei, Heilongjiang, Jilin, Liaoning, Inner Mongolia, Shanxi, Xinjiang ). It grows in well-lit places, sometimes in saline soil.

Allium bidentatum produces very narrow cylindrical bulbs rarely more than 4 mm across. Scape is round in cross-section, up to 30 cm tall. Leaves are more or less round in cross-section, up to 15 cm long. Umbel is hemispherical, with red or red-violet flowers.

Two varieties are recognized.

- Allium bidentatum var. bidentatum - most of species range
- Allium bidentatum var. qinggouense Tolgor & Y.T.Zhao - Inner Mongolia
