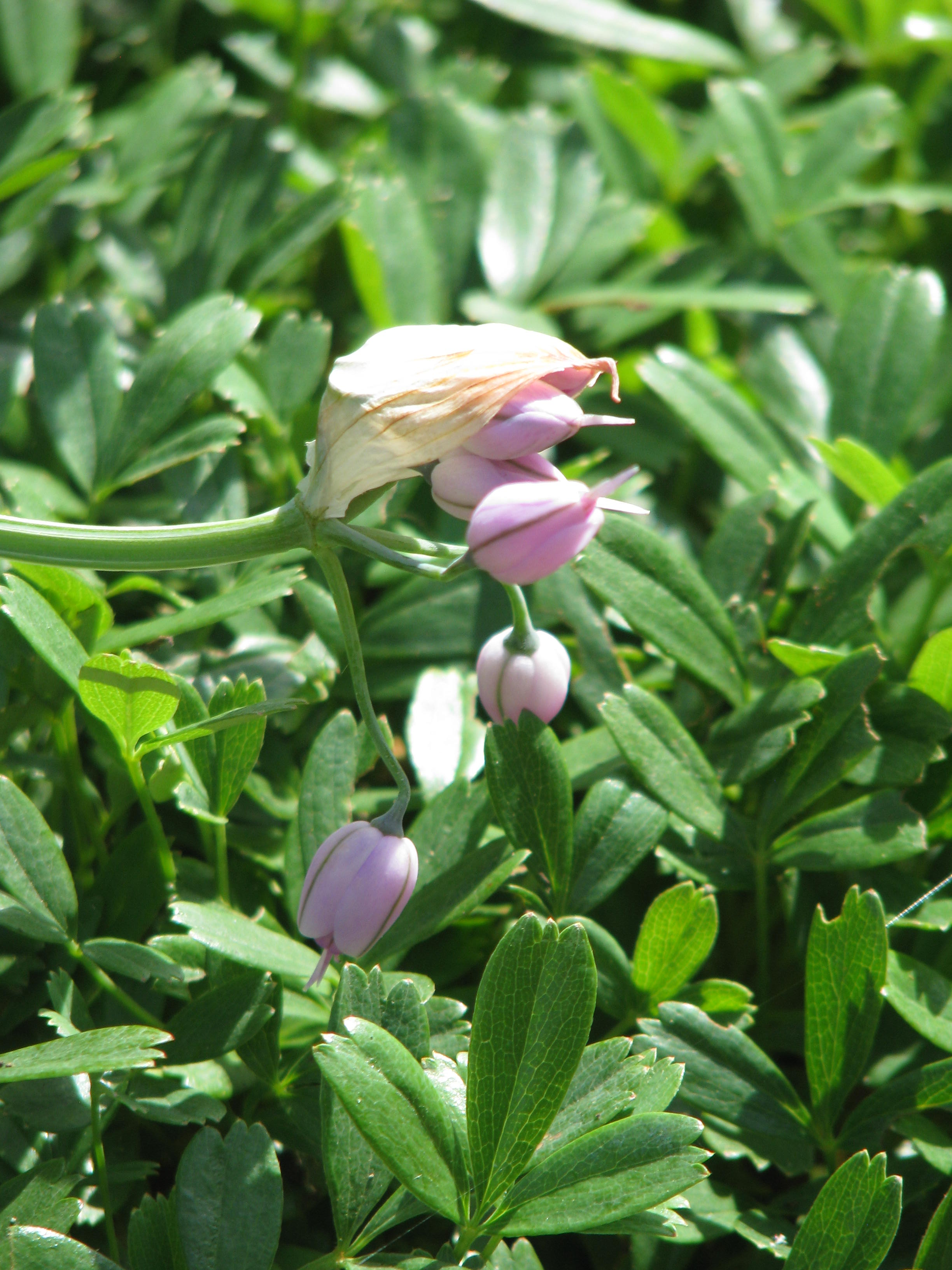

Scientific classification
- Kingdom: Plantae
- Clade: Tracheophytes
- Clade: Angiosperms
- Clade: Monocots
- Order: Asparagales
- Family: Amaryllidaceae
- Subfamily: Allioideae
- Genus: Allium
- Subgenus: A. subg. Amerallium
- Species: A. macranthum

Binomial name
- Allium macranthum Baker

Synonyms
- Allium oviflorum Regel; Allium simethis H.Lév.

= Allium macranthum =

大花韭 da hua jiu

Species of flowering plant

Allium macranthum is an Asian species of wild onion native to Bhutan, Sikkim, Gansu, Shaanxi, Sichuan and Tibet. It grows in wet places at elevations of 2700–4200 metres.

Allium macranthum has short, thick roots and a cylindrical bulb. Scapes are up to 60 cm tall. Leaves are flat, long, and thin, about the same length as the scapes but less than 2 cm across. Umbels have only a few purple, bell-shaped flowers.
