= Allium austrosibiricum =

Scientific classification
- Kingdom: Plantae
- Clade: Embryophytes
- Clade: Tracheophytes
- Clade: Spermatophytes
- Clade: Angiosperms
- Clade: Monocots
- Order: Asparagales
- Family: Amaryllidaceae
- Subfamily: Allioideae
- Genus: Allium
- Subgenus: A. subg. Rhizirideum
- Species: A. austrosibiricum

Binomial name
- Allium austrosibiricum N.Friesen

Species of flowering plant

Allium austrosibiricum is a species of onion native to Mongolia and southern Siberia (Tuva and Altay Krai). Some sources consider the name synonymous with A. spirale, but others recognize it as a distinct species.
