= Allium spirale =

Scientific classification
- Kingdom: Plantae
- Clade: Tracheophytes
- Clade: Angiosperms
- Clade: Monocots
- Order: Asparagales
- Family: Amaryllidaceae
- Subfamily: Allioideae
- Genus: Allium
- Subgenus: A. subg. Rhizirideum
- Species: A. spirale

Binomial name
- Allium spirale Willd.

Synonyms
- Allium canescens Schult. & Schult.f.; Allium longicaule Schult. & Schult.f.; Allium senescens Ker Gawl. 1808, illegitimate homonym not L. 1753 nor Miq. 1867 nor Host 1827 nor Suter 1802 nor Thunb. 1784; Allium spurium Schult. & Schult.f. 1830, illegitimate homonym not G. Don 1827; Allium trisulcum Schult. & Schult.f.

Species of plant

Allium spirale, also known as Korean aging chive, is a plant species native to Korea, Primorye, and parts of China. It is cultivated in many other regions and has for some reason obtained the common name German garlic. Other common names include spiral onion, corkscrew onion, and curly chives.

Allium spirale forms a cluster of narrow bulbs up to 15 mm in diameter. Scape is up to 40 cm tall. Leaves are flat, long and narrow, shorter than the scape but only about 5 mm across, generally twisted in a helical fashion. Umbel is hemispheric, densely crowded with many flowers. Tepals pink with a dark red midvein.

== Habitat ==
Allium spirale typically grows on dry slopes, loess, steppes, and places with significant amounts of sand, gravel or stone.
