= Allium struzlianum =

Conservation status
- Endangered (IUCN 3.1)

Scientific classification
- Kingdom: Plantae
- Clade: Tracheophytes
- Clade: Angiosperms
- Clade: Monocots
- Order: Asparagales
- Family: Amaryllidaceae
- Subfamily: Allioideae
- Genus: Allium
- Subgenus: Allium subg. Melanocrommyum
- Species: A. struzlianum

Binomial name
- Allium struzlianum Ogan.

Species of flowering plant

Allium struzlianum, or Struzl's onion, is a species of onion that is endemic to Armenia. It has been found in the Dzhadzhur Pass and the Urts Range. It can be found on montane steppes between elevations of 800–2,000 m. It flowers in May–June, and bears fruit in June–July.

The species is very rare with a severely fragmented population, estimated to be less than 250 individuals. It is threatened by habitat loss and pasturing.
