= Allium pyrenaicum =

Scientific classification
- Kingdom: Plantae
- Clade: Embryophytes
- Clade: Tracheophytes
- Clade: Spermatophytes
- Clade: Angiosperms
- Clade: Monocots
- Order: Asparagales
- Family: Amaryllidaceae
- Subfamily: Allioideae
- Genus: Allium
- Subgenus: A. subg. Allium
- Species: A. pyrenaicum

Binomial name
- Allium pyrenaicum Costa & Vayr.

Synonyms
- Allium controversum Costa

Species of flowering plant

Allium pyrenaicum is a species of wild garlic native to the Spanish Pyrenees. It prefers to grow in gorges in light shade, on substrates that experience at most moderate disturbance.
