= Taxonomy of Tulipa =

Classification of tulips

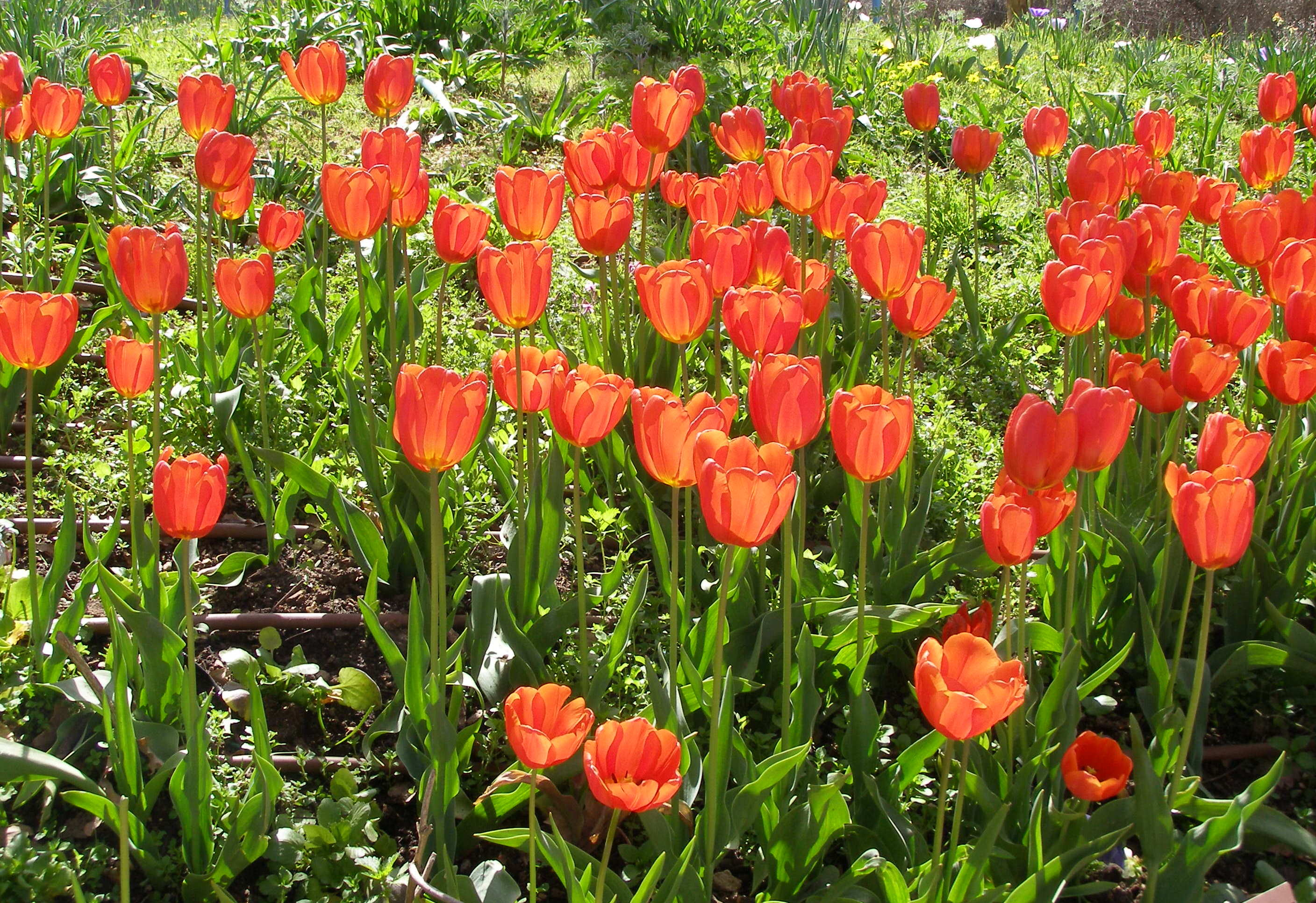
Red Tulipa × gesneriana flowers

The taxonomy of Tulipa places the genus in the family Liliaceae, and subdivides it as four subgenera, and comprises about 75 species.

== History ==
While tulips were known from at least the 12th century in Persia, and appear in decorative art in Turkey in the 13th century, the first description in European botanical literature, was by Conrad Gesner in his De Hortus Germanica (1561), which he referred to as Tulipa turcarum, and states he saw in a garden in Augsburg in 1559.

== Phylogeny ==
The taxonomy of Tulipa has always been complex and difficult for many reasons. Tulipa is a genus of the Liliaceae (lily) family, once one of the largest family of monocots, but which molecular phylogenetics has shown to be a much smaller discrete family with only 15 genera. Within Liliaceae, Tulipa is placed within Lilioideae, one of three subfamilies, with two tribes. Tribe Lilieae includes seven other genera in addition to Tulipa. Some species with a more eastern distribution (China, Korea, Japan) formerly classified as Tulipa are now considered as the separate genus Amana, including Amana edulis (Tulipa edulis). These species are more closely allied to Erythronium, although some authors believe that all three genera of the Tulipeae could be treated as a single genus.

The evolutionary and phylogenetic relationships between the genera currently included in Liliaceae are shown in this Cladogram.

Cladogram: Phylogeny and biogeography of the genera of the Liliaceae

- Liliaceae
  - - West NA
      - Tricyrtis
      - - Streptopoideae
          - Streptopus
          - - Prosartes
            - Scoliopus
  - - West NA
      Calochortus
    - Lilioideae* East NA EA
      - Medeoleae East NA
        - Clintonia
        - Medeola
      - Lilieae s.l. EA
        - Tulipeae East Asia
          - - Tulipa
            - - Amana
              - Erythronium
          - - Gagea (Lloydia)
        - Lilieae s.s. Himalayas
          - Notholirion
          - - Cardiocrinum
            - - Lilium (Nomocharis)
              - Fritillaria

Phylogenetic tree reflecting relationships based on molecular phylogenetic evidence.
*=Liliaceae sensu Tamura; EA=Eurasia NA=North America

== Subdivision ==
=== Subgenera and sections ===
Historically, subdivision of the genus and speciation (separation of species) has been based on vegetative and floral characters, but further research has shown these to be quite plastic, even within a species. Together with population variability, hybridisation and naturalisation, the classification and taxonomy of tulips has been complex and controversial.

The genus Tulipa was traditionally divided into two sections, Eriostemones and Tulipa (as Leiostemones), and comprises about 76 species. In 1997, the two sections were raised to subgenera and subgenus Tulipa was divided into five sections:

- Clusianae
- Eichleres
  - subdivided into eight series
- Kopalkowskiana
- Tulipanum
- Tulipa

Subgenus Eriostemones was divided into the sections:

- Biflores
- Sylvestres
- Saxatiles

In 2009, two other subgenera were proposed, Clusianae and Orithyia, and this total of four subgenera was corroborated by a 2013 study by Maarten Christenhusz and colleagues. That study did not find support for any of the previous sections proposed, and since hybridisation is relatively common, it is probably better to refrain from subdividing the subgenera any further.

=== Species ===
Historically there has been considerable disagreement about the number of species within the genus. For instance tulips often grow in remote inaccessible hills and valleys where winters are harsh and summers long and dry, and may flower for only a short period, meaning that species are often missed. Furthermore, descriptions of species were often derived from studying cultivated bulbs, and the variability of the wild population was poorly understood. Many of these species were never identified in the wild. These taxonomic difficulties are those associated with long established cultivation, hybridisation, selection and naturalisation. Treatments of the genus vary considerably in how they deal with speciation, with some, such as the Flora Europaea (1980), taking a very broad approach, and others a much more narrow approach. For example, a broad approach treats T. orphanidea as a single variable species with a range of forms, while those using a narrow approach divide the species into T. bithynica, T. hageri and T. whittallii.

The number of accepted species has varied between 50 and 114, for instance The Plant List (2013) includes 113. A 2013 review lists 76, as described here. This list was used as the basis for Kew Gardens monograph of that year, The Genus Tulipa.

==== Subgenus Clusianae ====
| Image | Scientific name | Distribution |
|---|---|---|
| | Tulipa clusiana Redouté (lady tulip) | Greece, Iran, Iraq, Afghanistan, Pakistan, W Himalayas |
| | Tulipa harazensis Rech.f. | Iran |
| | Tulipa linifolia Regel (Bokhara tulip) | Iran, Afghanistan, Tajikistan, Uzbekistan |
| | Tulipa montana Lindl. | Turkmenistan, Iran |

==== Subgenus Orithyia ====
| Image | Scientific name | Distribution |
|---|---|---|
| | Tulipa heteropetala Ledeb. | Altay Krai, Kazakhstan, Xinjiang |
| | Tulipa heterophylla (Regel) Baker | Kazakhstan, Xinjiang, Kyrgyzstan |
| | Tulipa sinkiangensis Z.M.Mao | Xinjiang |
| | Tulipa uniflora (L.) Besser ex Baker (Siberian tulip) | Siberia, Mongolia, Xinjiang, Inner Mongolia, Kazakhstan |

==== Subgenus Tulipa ====
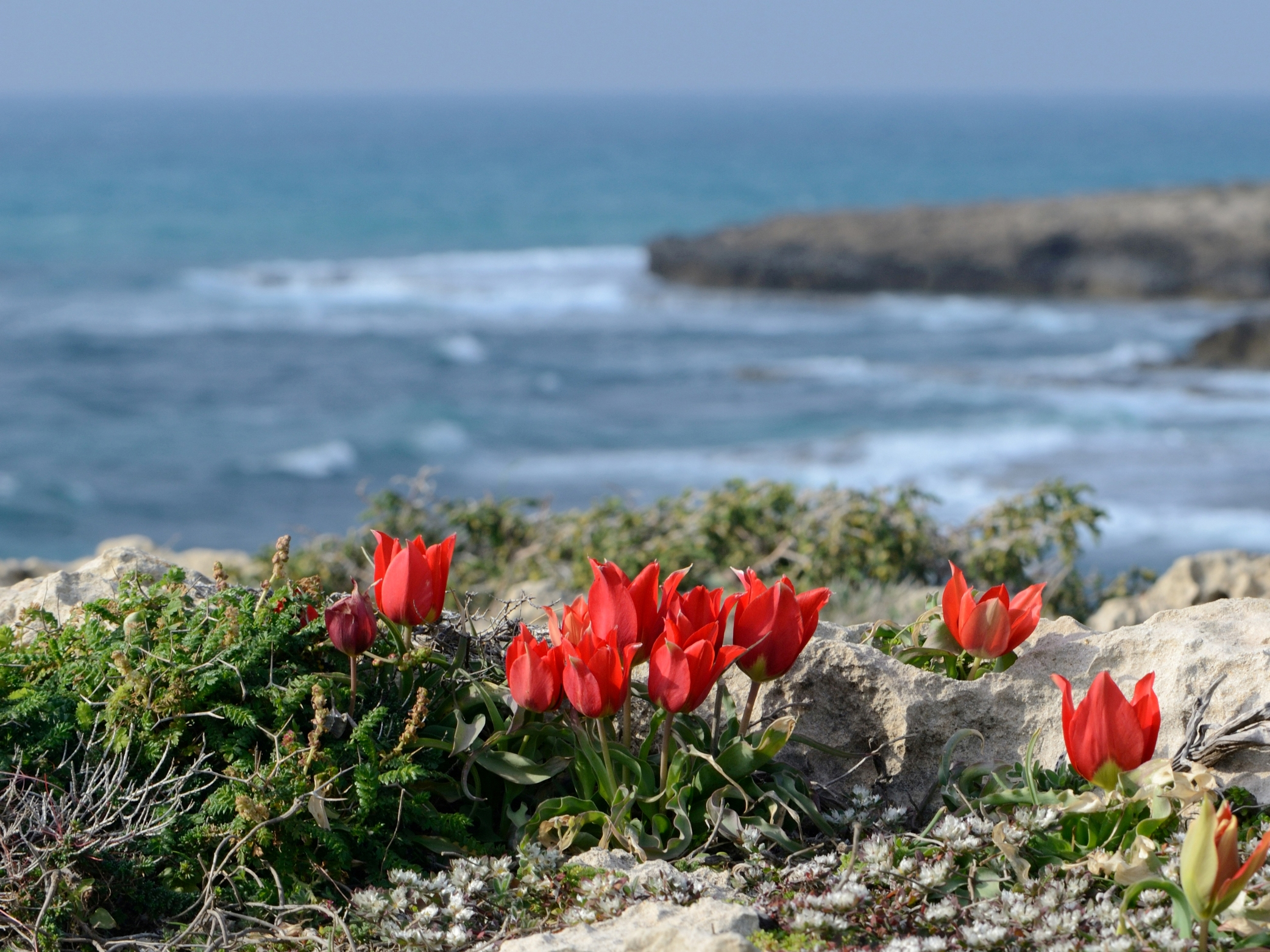
Tulipa agenensis, Israel

| Image | Scientific name | Distribution |
|---|---|---|
| | Tulipa agenensis Redouté (eyed tulip) | Greece, Middle East |
| | Tulipa albanica Kit Tan & Shuka (Albanian tulip) | Albania |
| | Tulipa alberti Regel (Albert's tulip) | Kazakhstan, Kyrgyzstan |
| | Tulipa aleppensis Boiss. ex Regel (Aleppo tulip) | Turkey, Syria, Lebanon |
| | Tulipa altaica Pall. ex Spreng. (Altai tulip) | Altai Krai, Western Siberia, Kazakhstan, Xinjiang |
| | Tulipa anisophylla Vved. | Tajikistan |
| | Tulipa armena Boiss. (Armenian tulip) | Turkey, Iran, South Caucasus |
| | Tulipa banuensis Grey-Wilson (Afghan tulip) | Afghanistan |
| | Tulipa borszczowii Regel | Kazakhstan |
| | Tulipa botschantzevae S.N.Abramova & Zakal. | Turkmenistan, Iran |
| | Tulipa butkovii Botschantz. | Uzbekistan |
| | Tulipa carinata Vved. (Pamir tulip) | Tajikistan, Uzbekistan, Afghanistan |
| | Tulipa cypria Stapf ex Turrill (Cyprian tulip) | Cyprus |
| | Tulipa dubia Vved. | Uzbekistan, Kyrgyzstan, Kazakhstan |
| | Tulipa eichleri Regel (Eichler's tulip) | Turkey, Iran, Caucasus, accepted by the World Flora Online as of March 2021 but regarded as a synonym of T. undulatifolia by others |
| | Tulipa faribae Ghahr., Attar & Ghahrem.-Nejad | Iran |
| | Tulipa ferganica Vved. | Uzbekistan, Kyrgyzstan |
| | Tulipa foliosa | Turkey |
| | Tulipa fosteriana W.Irving | Afghanistan, Central Asia |
| | Tulipa gesneriana L. (garden tulip) | |
| | Tulipa greigii Regel (maculate tulip) | Iran, Central Asia |
| | Tulipa heweri Raamsd. | Afghanistan |
| | Tulipa hissarica Popov & Vved. | Tajikistan, Uzbekistan |
| | Tulipa hoogiana B.Fedtsch. | Turkmenistan, Iran |
| | Tulipa hungarica Borbás (Rhodope tulip) | Hungary, Serbia, Bulgaria |
| | Tulipa iliensis Regel | Kazakhstan, Kyrgyzstan, Xinjiang |
| | Tulipa ingens (Tubergen's tulip) | Tajikistan, Uzbekistan |
| | Tulipa julia K.Koch (Julia tulip) | Turkey, South Caucasus, Syria, Lebanon |
| | Tulipa kaufmanniana Regel (waterlily tulip) | Central Asia |
| | Tulipa kolpakowskiana Regel (sun tulip) | Kazakhstan, Kyrgyzstan, Xinjiang, Afghanistan |
| | Tulipa korolkowii Regel | Central Asia |
| | Tulipa kosovarica Kit Tan, Shuka & Krasniqi | Kosovo |
| | Tulipa kuschkensis B.Fedtsch. | Turkmenistan, Afghanistan, Iran |
| | Tulipa lanata Regel | Tajikistan, Afghanistan, Pakistan, W Himalayas |
| | Tulipa lehmanniana Merckl. (Lehmann's tulip) | Afghanistan, Iran, Central Asia |
| | Tulipa lemmersii | Kazakhstan |
| | Tulipa micheliana Hoog | Central Asia to N.E. Iran, accepted by the World Checklist of Selected Plant Families as of May 2015, but regarded as a synonym of T. undulatifolia by others. |
| | Tulipa ostrowskiana Regel | Kazakhstan, Kyrgyzstan |
| | Tulipa persica (Lindl.) Sweet (Persian tulip) | Iran |
| | Tulipa platystemon Vved. | Kyrgyzstan |
| | Tulipa praestans H.B.May (multiflowered tulip) | Tajikistan |
| | Tulipa scardica Bornm. (Balkan tulip) | Kosovo, Greece |
| | Tulipa scharipovii Tojibaev | Kyrgyzstan, Uzbekistan |
| | Tulipa schmidtii Fomin | Iran, South Caucasus |
| | Tulipa serbica Tatic & Krivošej | Kosovo, Serbia |
| | Tulipa sosnowskyi Achv. & Mirzoeva | South Caucasus |
| | Tulipa suaveolens (syn. Tulipa schrenkii) Roth (scented or Crimean tulip, Schrenck's tulip) | Ukraine, Crimea, Russia and south of Siberia, Caucasus, Iran, Kazakhstan |
| | Tulipa subquinquefolia Vved. | Tajikistan, Uzbekistan |
| | Tulipa systola Stapf | Middle East |
| | Tulipa talassica Lazkov | Kyrgyzstan |
| | Tulipa tetraphylla Regel | Xinjiang, Kazakhstan, Kyrgyzstan |
| | Tulipa × tschimganica Botschantz. | Kazakhstan, Uzbekistan |
| | Tulipa ulophylla Wendelbo | Iran |
| | Tulipa undulatifolia Boiss. | Greece, Balkans, Caucasus, Middle East, Iran, Central Asia |
| | Tulipa uzbekistanica Botschantz. & Sharipov | Uzbekistan |
| | Tulipa vvedenskyi Botschantz. | Tajikistan |

==== Subgenus Eriostemones ====
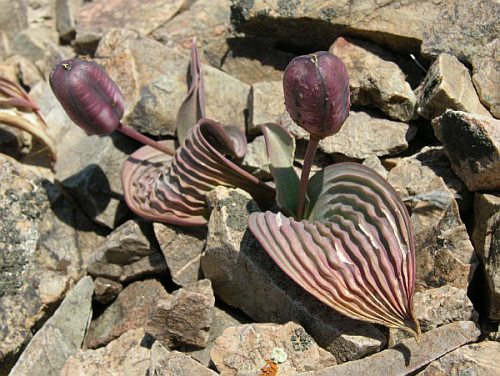
Tulipa regelii in Kazakhstan

| Image | Scientific name | Distribution |
|---|---|---|
| | Tulipa biflora Pall. (two-flowered tulip) | Macedonia, Egypt, Crimea, Russia, Asia from Saudi Arabia to Xinjiang + Western Siberia |
| | Tulipa bifloriformis Vved. | Central Asia |
| | Tulipa cinnabarina K.Perss. | Turkey |
| | Tulipa cretica Boiss. & Heldr. (Cretan tulip) | Crete |
| | Tulipa dasystemon (Regel) Regel | Central Asia, Xinjiang |
| | Tulipa humilis Herb. (rainbow tulip) | T. humilis has been considered by some to include the following species, although the World Checklist of Selected Plant Families does not: |
| | Tulipa aucheriana Baker | E. Turkey to Afghanistan |
| | Tulipa kurdica Wendelbo | N. Iraq |
| | Tulipa pulchella (Regel) Baker | S. & S.E. Turkey to N. Iran |
| | Tulipa violacea Boiss. & Buhse | S.E. Transcaucasus |
| | Tulipa kolbintsevii Zonn. | Kazakhstan |
| | Tulipa koyuncui Eker & Babaç | Turkey |
| | Tulipa orithyioides Vved. | Central Asia |
| | Tulipa orphanidea Boiss. & Heldr. (syn. T. hageri) (green or orange wild tulip) | Greece, Bulgaria, Turkey |
| | Tulipa regelii Krassn. (plicate or Regel's tulip) | Kazakhstan |
| | Tulipa saxatilis Sieber ex Spreng. (syn. T. bakeri) (rock tulip) | Greece, Turkey |
| | Tulipa sprengeri Baker | Turkey |
| | Tulipa sintenisii Baker | Turkey |
| | Tulipa sylvestris L. (wild tulip) | Eurasia from Portugal to Xinjiang |
| | Tulipa turkestanica (Regel) Regel | Central Asia, Xinjiang |
| | Tulipa urumiensis Stapf (tarda tulip) | Kazakhstan, Kyrgyzstan, Iran |

==== Unplaced ====
- The horned tulip is often offered in the trade as "Tulipa acuminata", but is in fact a cultivar, unknown from the wild, and should be distributed under its correct cultivar name: Tulipa 'Cornuta'.
- Tulipa boettgeri Regel – Central Asia; accepted by the World Checklist of Selected Plant Families as of May 2015, but regarded as unplaced by Christenhusz et al.

=== Species reclassified to other genera ===
These species were classified as Tulipa but are now placed in other genera

- Tulipa anhuiensis X.S.Shen, now: Amana anhuiensis (X.S.Shen) Christenh.
- Tulipa breyniana L., now: Moraea collina Thunb. (Iridaceae).
- Tulipa edulis (Miq.) Baker, now: Amana edulis (Miq.) Honda.
- Tulipa erythronioides Baker, now: Amana erythronioides (Baker) D.Y.Tan & D.Y.Hong.
- Tulipa graminifolia Baker ex S.Moore, now: Amana edulis (Miq.) Honda.
- Tulipa latifolia (Makino) Makino, now: Amana erythronioides (Baker) D.Y.Tan & D.Y.Hong
- Tulipa ornithogaloides Fisch. ex Besser, now: Gagea triflora (Ledeb.) Schult. & Schult.f.
- Tulipa pudica (Pursh) Raf., now: Fritillaria pudica (Pursh) Spreng.
- Tulipa sibthorpiana Sm., now: Fritillaria sibthorpiana (Sm.) Baker.

== Etymology ==
The word tulip, first mentioned in western Europe in or around 1554 and seemingly derived from the "Turkish Letters" of diplomat Ogier Ghiselin de Busbecq, first appeared in English as tulipa or tulipant, entering the language by way of French: tulipe and its obsolete form tulipan or by way of Modern Latin tulīpa, from Ottoman Turkish tülbend ("muslin" or "gauze"), and may be ultimately derived from the Persian: دلبند delband ("Turban"), this name being applied because of a perceived resemblance of the shape of a tulip flower to that of a turban. This may have been due to a translation error in early times, when it was fashionable in the Ottoman Empire to wear tulips on turbans. The translator possibly confused the flower for the turban.

== Bibliography ==
=== Books ===
- Everett, Diana (2013). The Genus Tulipa: Tulips of the World. Kew Publishing. ISBN 978-1-84246-481-6.
- Grey-Wilson, C.; Matthews, V. A. (1964). Tulipa L. Cambridge University Press. pp. 28–34. ISBN 978-0-521-20108-7., In Tutin et al (1980)
- Hall, A. Daniel (1940). The genus Tulipa. London: Royal Horticultural Society.
- Kamenetsky, Rina; Okubo, Hiroshi, eds. (2012). Ornamental Geophytes: From Basic Science to Sustainable Production. CRC Press. ISBN 978-1-4398-4924-8.
- Linnaeus, Carl (1753). "Tulipa". Species Plantarum vol. 1. Vol. 1. pp. 305–306. see also Species Plantarum
- Meerow, A.W. (2012-09-17). Taxonomy and Phylogeny: Liliaceae. CRC Press. pp. 17–55. ISBN 978-1-4398-4924-8. In Kamenetsky & Okubo (2012)
- Tutin, T. G.; et al., eds. (1980). Flora Europaea. Volume 5, Alismataceae to Orchidaceae (monocotyledones). Cambridge, England: Cambridge University Press. ISBN 978-0-521-20108-7.

=== Articles ===
- Christenhusz, Maarten J.M.; Govaerts, Rafaël; David, John C.; Hall, Tony; Borland, Katherine; Roberts, Penelope S.; Tuomisto, Anne; Buerki, Sven; Chase, Mark W.; Fay, Michael F. (2013). "Tiptoe through the tulips – cultural history, molecular phylogenetics and classification of Tulipa (Liliaceae)". Botanical Journal of the Linnean Society. 172 (3): 280–328. doi:10.1111/boj.12061.
- Clennett, John C. B.; Chase, Mark W.; Forest, Félix; Maurin, Olivier; Wilkin, Paul (December 2012). "Phylogenetic systematics of Erythronium (Liliaceae): morphological and molecular analyses". Botanical Journal of the Linnean Society. 170 (4): 504–528. doi:10.1111/j.1095-8339.2012.01302.x.
- Eker, İsmail; Babaç, Mehmet Tekin; Koyuncu, Mehmet (29 January 2014). "Revision of the genus Tulipa L. (Liliaceae) in Turkey". Phytotaxa. 157 (1): 001. doi:10.11646/phytotaxa.157.1.1.
- Kim, Jung Sung; Hong, Jeong-Ki; Chase, Mark W.; Fay, Michael F.; Kim, Joo-Hwan (May 2013). "Familial relationships of the monocot order Liliales based on a molecular phylogenetic analysis using four plastid loci: matK, rbcL, atpB and atpF-H". Botanical Journal of the Linnean Society. 172 (1): 5–21. doi:10.1111/boj.12039.
- Kim, Jung Sung; Kim, Joo-Hwan; Robinson-Rechavi, Marc (14 June 2013). "Comparative Genome Analysis and Phylogenetic Relationship of Order Liliales Insight from the Complete Plastid Genome Sequences of Two Lilies (Lilium longiflorum and Alstroemeria aurea)". PLoS ONE. 8 (6) e68180. Bibcode:2013PLoSO...868180K. doi:10.1371/journal.pone.0068180. PMC 3688979. PMID 23950788.
- Leitch, I. J.; Beaulieu, JM; Cheung, K; Hanson, L; Lysak, MA; Fay, MF (November 2007). "Punctuated genome size evolution in Liliaceae". Journal of Evolutionary Biology. 20 (6): 2296–308. doi:10.1111/j.1420-9101.2007.01416.x. PMID 17956392. S2CID 25766640.
- Patterson, T. B.; Givnish, T. J. (2002). "Phylogeny, concerted convergence, and phylogenetic niche conservatism in the core Liliales: insights from rbcL and ndhF sequence data". Evolution. 56 (2): 233–252. doi:10.1111/j.0014-3820.2002.tb01334.x. PMID 11926492. S2CID 39420833.
- Peruzzi, L.; Leitch, I.J.; Caparelli, K.F. (2009). "Chromosome diversity and evolution in Liliaceae". Annals of Botany. 103 (3): 459–475. doi:10.1093/aob/mcn230. PMC 2707325. PMID 19033282.
- Southern, David I. (1967). "Species relationships in the genus Tulipa". Chromosoma. 23: 80–94. doi:10.1007/BF00293313. S2CID 41231383.
- Vinnersten, A.; Bremer, K. (September 2001). "Age and biogeography of major clades in Liliales". American Journal of Botany. 88 (9): 1695–1703. doi:10.2307/3558415. JSTOR 3558415. PMID 21669704.
- Zonneveld, Ben J. M. (11 July 2009). "The systematic value of nuclear genome size for "all" species of Tulipa L. (Liliaceae)". Plant Systematics and Evolution. 281 (1–4): 217–245. Bibcode:2009PSyEv.281..217Z. doi:10.1007/s00606-009-0203-7.

=== Websites ===
- Stevens, P.F. (2015) [2001], Angiosperm Phylogeny Website, Missouri Botanical Garden, see also Angiosperm Phylogeny Website
- "Tulipa". The Plant List (2013). Version 1.1. 2013.
- "Tulipa". World Checklist of Selected Plant Families. Royal Botanic Gardens, Kew.
- "Kolpakowski Tulip, aka Sun Tulip". Paghat's Garden. Archived from the original on June 30, 2003.
- Harper, Douglas (2017). "Tulip". Online etymology dictionary.
- Grout, James. "Conrad Gessner". Encyclopaedia Romana. University of Chicago.
