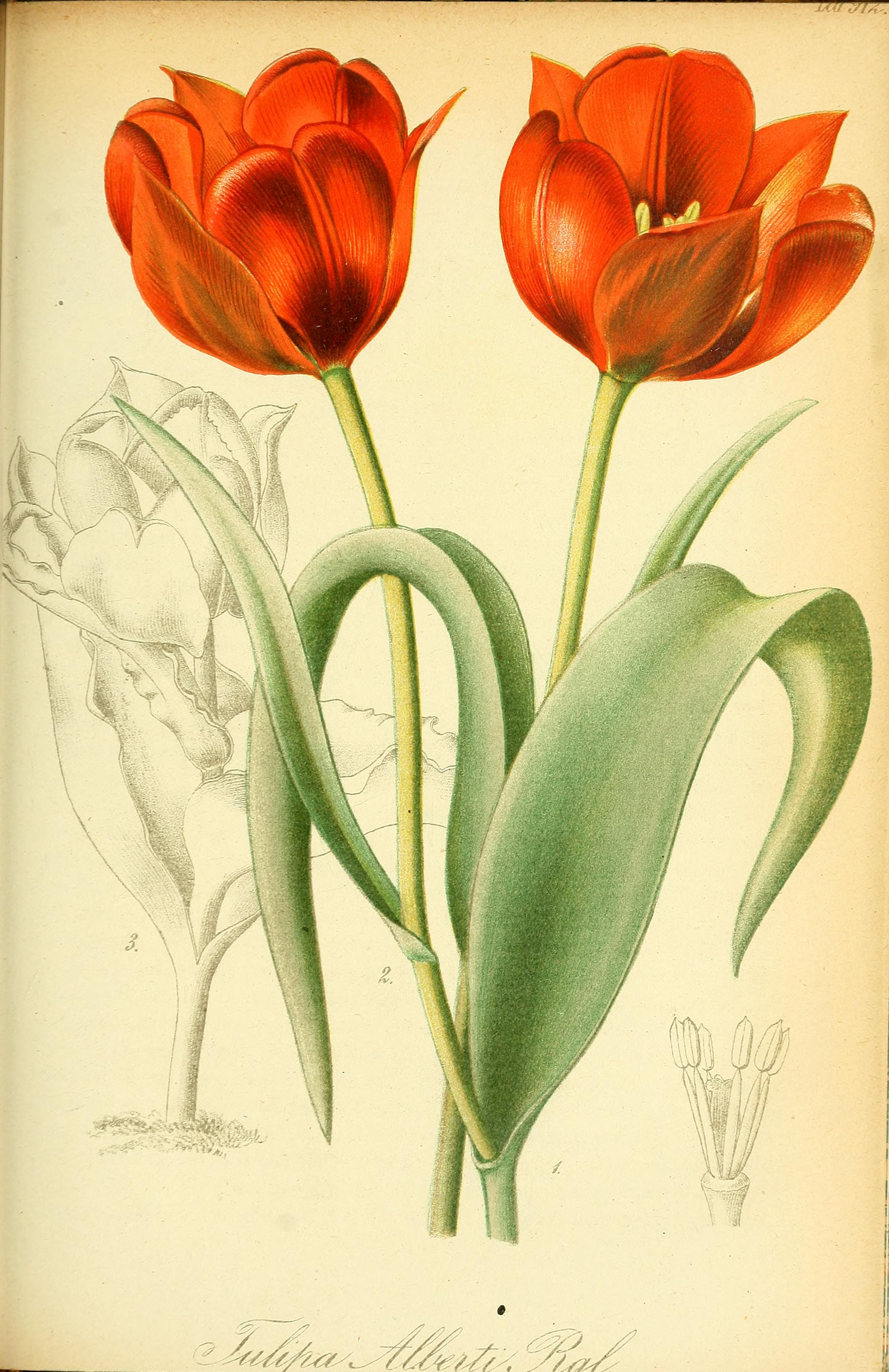
- Illustration of Tulipa alberti from Gartenflora magazine in 1877

Scientific classification
- Kingdom: Plantae
- Clade: Embryophytes
- Clade: Tracheophytes
- Clade: Angiosperms
- Clade: Monocots
- Order: Liliales
- Family: Liliaceae
- Subfamily: Lilioideae
- Genus: Tulipa
- Species: T. alberti

Binomial name
- Tulipa alberti Regel

Synonyms
- None known

= Tulipa alberti =

Species of flowering plant

Tulipa alberti, or Albert's tulip, is a species of flowering plant in the family Liliaceae. It has long reddish, orange or pink flowers. It comes from the mountains of Central Asia.

== Description ==
It has an ovoid shaped bulb, which is 4 cm (2 in) in diameter.

It has an erect, glaucous stem which is 18–20 cm (7–8 in) tall.

It has 3-4 leaves, which are glaucous green, without blotches, and broad. They are lanceolate (lance shaped), or crispate (curled). The basal leaf is around 14 cm (6 in) long, and around 6 cm (2 in) wide. Other leaves can be 11 cm (4 in) by 2.3 cm (1 in) wide, and undulated, or wavy.

It has a solitary flower, which blooms in mid spring, in April.

The cup-shaped flower, is similar in shape to those of Tulipa greigii, or Tulipa armena.

The blossoms come in a range of colours, from orange with reddish tint, to orange, orange-pink, red, and dark claret. There is an occasional yellow form.

The flowers have 3 inner petals and 3 outer petals. Normally the three inner tepals of T. alberti are obtuse, and folded to the inside, and the three outer tepals are sub-acute, and folded to the outside. The outer tepals are 8 cm (3 in) long and 6 cm (2 in) wide. The petals are marked at the base with a blotch of lemon yellow, or yellow margined with red-brown, dark purple, or black. The rare yellow forms of both T. greigii and T. alberti can have a crimson blotch on the inner side of the petal.

In the stamen, it has 2.9 cm long stamens, small yellow, filaments 1.4 cm long and anthers similar in length to the filaments, which are dark purple in shade, or sometimes yellow in the pale coloured forms. It has a peduncle, which is erect, pubescent, 6–8 in (152–203 mm) long.

After flowering, it produces a seed capsule. It has a light green, cylindrical ovary, which is 2.2 cm long and 0.7 cm wide. The ovoid with tapering tops, seed capsule is 4.3 cm long and 2.5 cm wide. Inside are bright brown, sub-triangular seeds, 0.6 cm long and 0.5 cm wide.

=== Biochemistry ===
Most tulips are diploid, having two sets of chromosomes. Most species of Tulipa have the same basic chromosome number, 2n = 2x = 24.

Natural cytokinin-like substances were found in ethanol extracts from the bulbs.

== Taxonomy ==
The genus name (of Tulipa) comes the Latinized version of the Turkish name tulbend meaning a turban.

It is commonly known as Albert's tulip.

The specific epithet alberti refers Johann Albert von Regel, who was the son of Eduard August von Regel. Johann was with him while he collected during a botanical excursions in Turkestan and in the Pamir region of Central Asia.

T. alberti was originally found in Turkestan, and then described and published by Eduard August von Regel (1815–1892), German botanist in Trudy Imp. S.-Peterburgsk. Bot. Sada (Proceedings of the Petersburg Botanical Garden) Vol.5 on page 264 in 1877. It was also published by Regel in Gartenflora Vol.26 on page 257 in 1877.

In taxonomic theory, it should be called albertii (with an extra i at the end), but due to the results of a taxonomic conference Shenzhen ICN Art. 60.8, it was deemed permissible to leave it as alberti. It is also an accepted name and was verified by United States Department of Agriculture and the Agricultural Research Service on 16 November 1993. Some sources still call it Tulipa albertii.

== Distribution and habitat ==
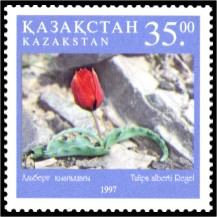
Stamp from Kazakhstan in 1997, featuring Tulipa alberti

It is native to the temperate areas of Central Asia, or Middle Asia.

=== Range ===
It is found in Kazakhstan, Kyrgyzstan (around Lake Balkhash,) and Uzbekistan.

It is found on the Tien Shan mountains (crossing the three countries), alongside other tulips such as Tulipa kaufmanniana and Tulip zenaidae (now classed as a synonym of Tulipa lehmanniana Merckl.).

=== Habitat ===
It grows on the gravelly slopes.

== Culture ==
In 1997, a set of stamps with images of tulips was released in Kazakhstan. The series included, Tulipa regelii, Tulipa greigii and Tulipa alberti.

== Other sources ==
- Huxley, A., ed. 1992. The new Royal Horticultural Society dictionary of gardening
- Komarov, V. L. et al., eds. 1934–1964. Flora SSSR.
- Raamsdonk, L. W. D. van & T. de Vries. 1995. Species relationships and taxonomy in Tulipa subg. Tulipa (Liliaceae). Pl. Syst. Evol. 195:40.
- Walters, S. M. et al., eds. 1986–2000. European garden flora.
