= Postage stamps and postal history of Kazakhstan =

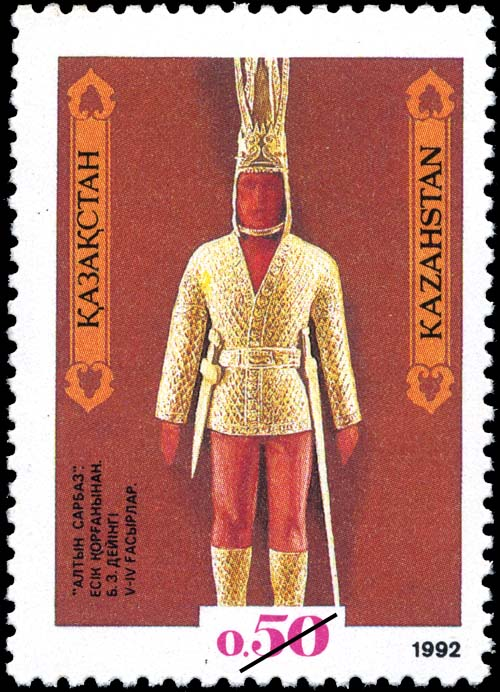
The first stamp of Kazakhstan, issued 1992

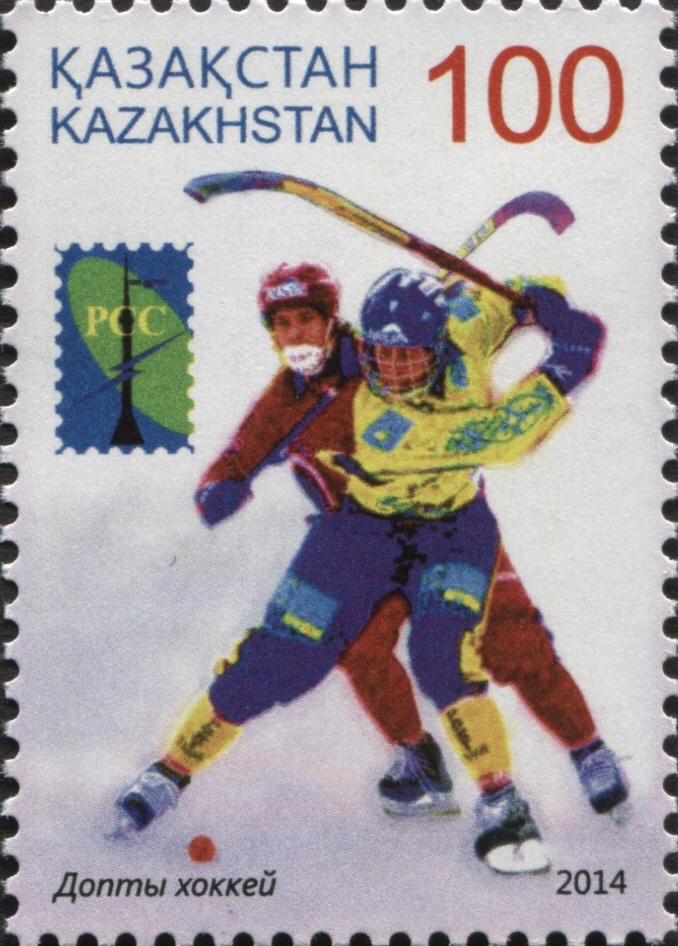
Honoring Kazakhstan national bandy team. Bandy is the only team sport in which Kazakhstan has captured world championship medals.

This is a survey of the postage stamps and postal history of Kazakhstan.

Under the Soviet Union, the Kazakh SSR postal service was an integral part of the Soviet system. The republic was periodically recognized in sets of stamps honoring the different parts of the USSR.

Kazakhstan became independent in December 1991, and organized its own post. Its first stamp, depicting a warrior's suit found at the Issyk mound in 1969, was issued 23 March 1992. Overprinted stamps of the USSR are also known from this early period, but the Philatelic Club of Almaty has concluded that their official status is uncertain; although some saw postal usage, they were not generally available in post offices, nor do their values reflect actual postal rates in effect.

The first definitive stamps were a set of five issued on 24 January 1993, four of which were a stylized design consisting of a yurt and spaceship (alluding to the country's Baikonur Cosmodrome), along with the higher value of 50 rubles depicting the flag of Kazakhstan.

The currency changed to tijn and tenge around the end of 1993. Existing stamps, all denominated in rubles and kopecks, were then sold as if they were in the new currencies. New stamps issued in the first half of 1994 were initially sold as denominated in tijn, then later in tenge. The yurt-and-spaceship design was re-issued in the new currency beginning in July 1994.

Kazakhstan has since followed a moderate pattern of issues, averaging 30 to 40 types per year. The space theme is frequent.

In 1997, a set of stamps with images of tulips was released including Tulipa regelii, Tulipa greigii and Tulipa alberti.

== See also ==
- Kazpost
- Media of Kazakhstan
- Communications in Kazakhstan

== Bibliography ==
- Scott catalogue
- Stanley Gibbons Ltd: various catalogues
- Rossiter, Stuart & John Flower. The Stamp Atlas. London: Macdonald, 1986. ISBN 0-356-10862-7
