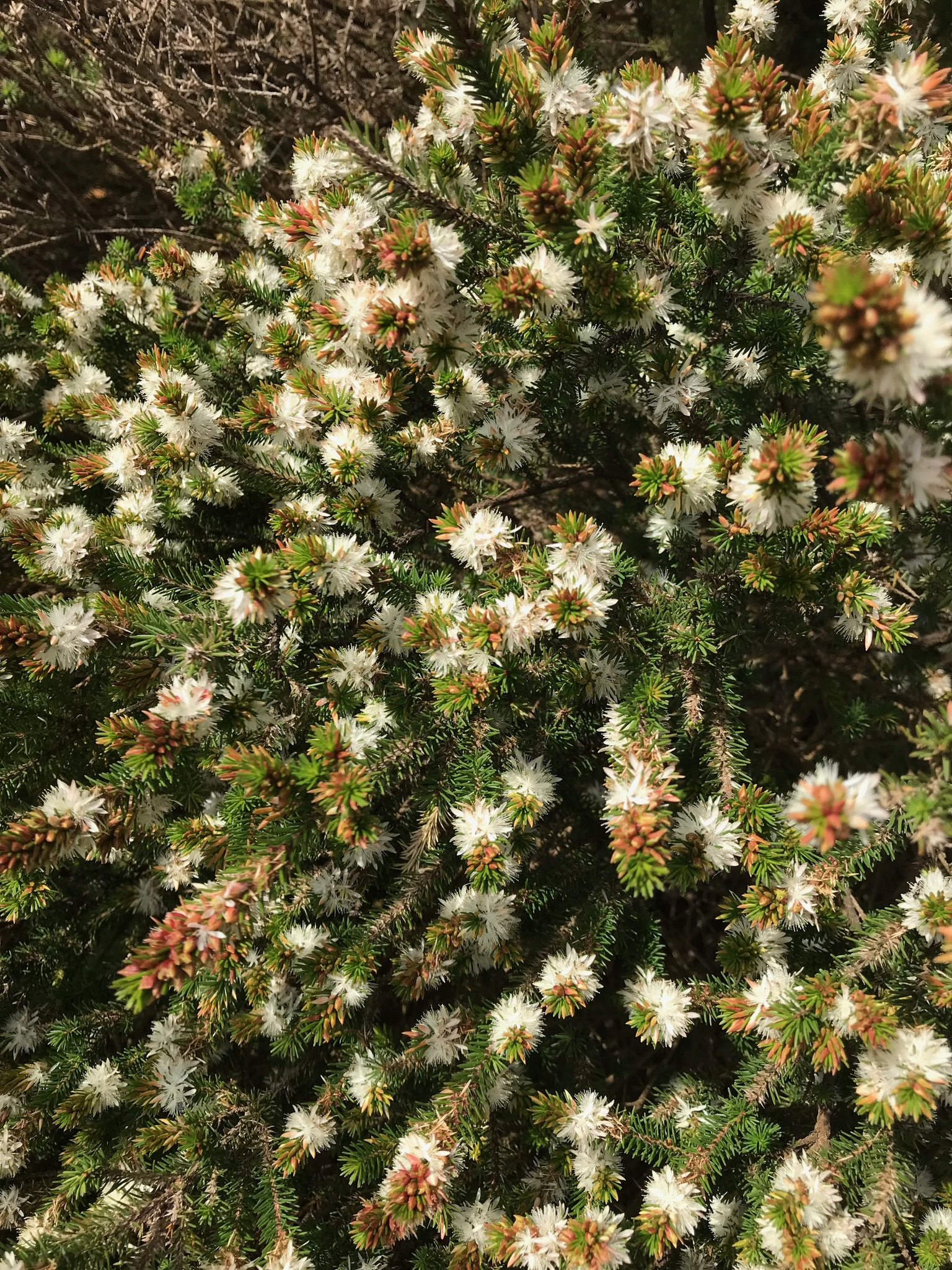

Scientific classification
- Kingdom: Plantae
- Clade: Tracheophytes
- Clade: Angiosperms
- Clade: Eudicots
- Clade: Rosids
- Order: Myrtales
- Family: Myrtaceae
- Genus: Calytrix
- Species: C. hirta

Binomial name
- Calytrix hirta (Regel) Nge & K.R.Thiele

Synonyms
- Calytrix sp. Esperance (M.A.Burgman 4268A) WA Herbarium; Lhotskya ericoides Schauer; Lhotskya hirta Regel isonym; Lhotskya hirta Regel

= Calytrix hirta =

Species of flowering plant

Calytrix hirta is a species of flowering plant in the myrtle family Myrtaceae and is endemic to the south-west of Western Australia. It is a spreading shrub with linear to slightly curved leaves and clusters of white flowers with 32 to 46 white stamens in several rows.

== Description ==
Calytrix hirta is a spreading shrub that typically grows to a height of up to 0.5–2 m (1 ft 8 in – 6 ft 7 in) and has many stems. Its young stems are cream-coloured and pale brown or reddish brown with many shaggy hairs. The leaves are linear to slightly curved, 3–11 mm (0.12–0.43 in) long, 0.28–0.82 mm (0.011–0.032 in) wide on a petiole about 0.5–0.7 mm (0.020–0.028 in) long. The flowers are borne in groups on a peduncle about 0.5 mm (0.020 in) long, with green to light brown bracteoles 3–4 mm (0.12–0.16 in) long. The floral tube is 2.5–3.5 mm (0.098–0.138 in) long and has 6 to 8 ribs. The sepals are 0.5–1 mm (0.020–0.039 in) long and 0.2–0.8 mm (0.0079–0.0315 in) wide and lack awns. The petals are glabrous, white, 4.0–5.5 mm (0.16–0.22 in) long and 0.8–1.5 mm (0.031–0.059 in) wide with 32 to 46 white stamens, the longest filaments 4–5 mm (0.16–0.20 in) long. Flowering occurs from late September to late December.

== Taxonomy ==
This species was first formally described in 1863 by Eduard von Regel who gave it the name Lhotskya hirta in Gartenflora. In 2017, Francis Nge and Kevin Thiele transferred the species to Calytrix as C. hirta in the journal Nuytsia. The specific epithet (hirta) means 'shaggy with long hairs'.

== Distribution and habitat ==
This species of Calytrix is found in low coastal heath on coastal or near-coastal sand dunes, in the Cape Naturaliste area, between Walpole and Esperance, and inland as far as the Stirling Range in the Avon Wheatbelt, Esperance Plains, Jarrah Forest, Mallee and Warren bioregions of south-western Western Australia.

== Conservation status ==
Calytrix hirta is listed as "not threatened" by the Government of Western Australia Department of Biodiversity, Conservation and Attractions.
