= Allium flavovirens =

阿拉善韭 a la shan jiu

Scientific classification
- Kingdom: Plantae
- Clade: Tracheophytes
- Clade: Angiosperms
- Clade: Monocots
- Order: Asparagales
- Family: Amaryllidaceae
- Subfamily: Allioideae
- Genus: Allium
- Subgenus: A. subg. Reticulatobulbosa
- Species: A. flavovirens

Binomial name
- Allium flavovirens Regel

Synonyms
- Allium alaschanicum Y.Z. Zhao

Species of flowering plant

Allium flavovirens is a species of onions endemic to the western part of Inner Mongolia. It grows in dry places at altitudes of 1800–3100 m.

Allium flavovirens has 2 or 3 bulbs, each up to 20 mm in diameter. Scapes are up to 25 cm long, round in cross-section. Flowers are white or pale yellow but appear reddish-purple from the underside.
