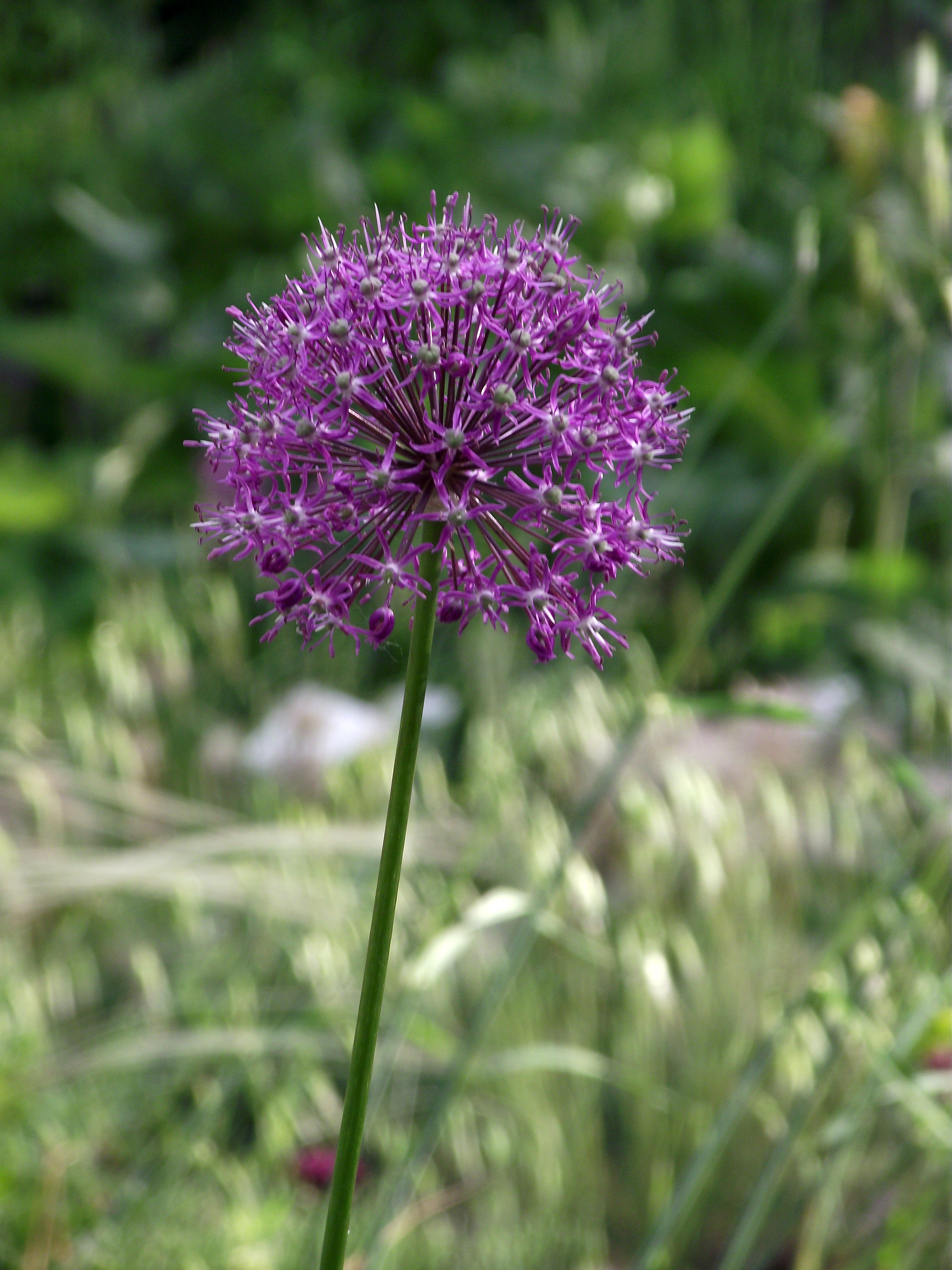
- Inflorescence

Scientific classification
- Kingdom: Plantae
- Clade: Tracheophytes
- Clade: Angiosperms
- Clade: Monocots
- Order: Asparagales
- Family: Amaryllidaceae
- Subfamily: Allioideae
- Genus: Allium
- Subgenus: Allium subg. Melanocrommyum
- Species: A. altissimum

Binomial name
- Allium altissimum Regel

= Allium altissimum =

Species of flowering plant

Allium altissimum, the tall onion, is a species of flowering plant in the family Amaryllidaceae, native to Central Asia, Iran, and Afghanistan. Its best-known cultivar is 'Goliath'.
