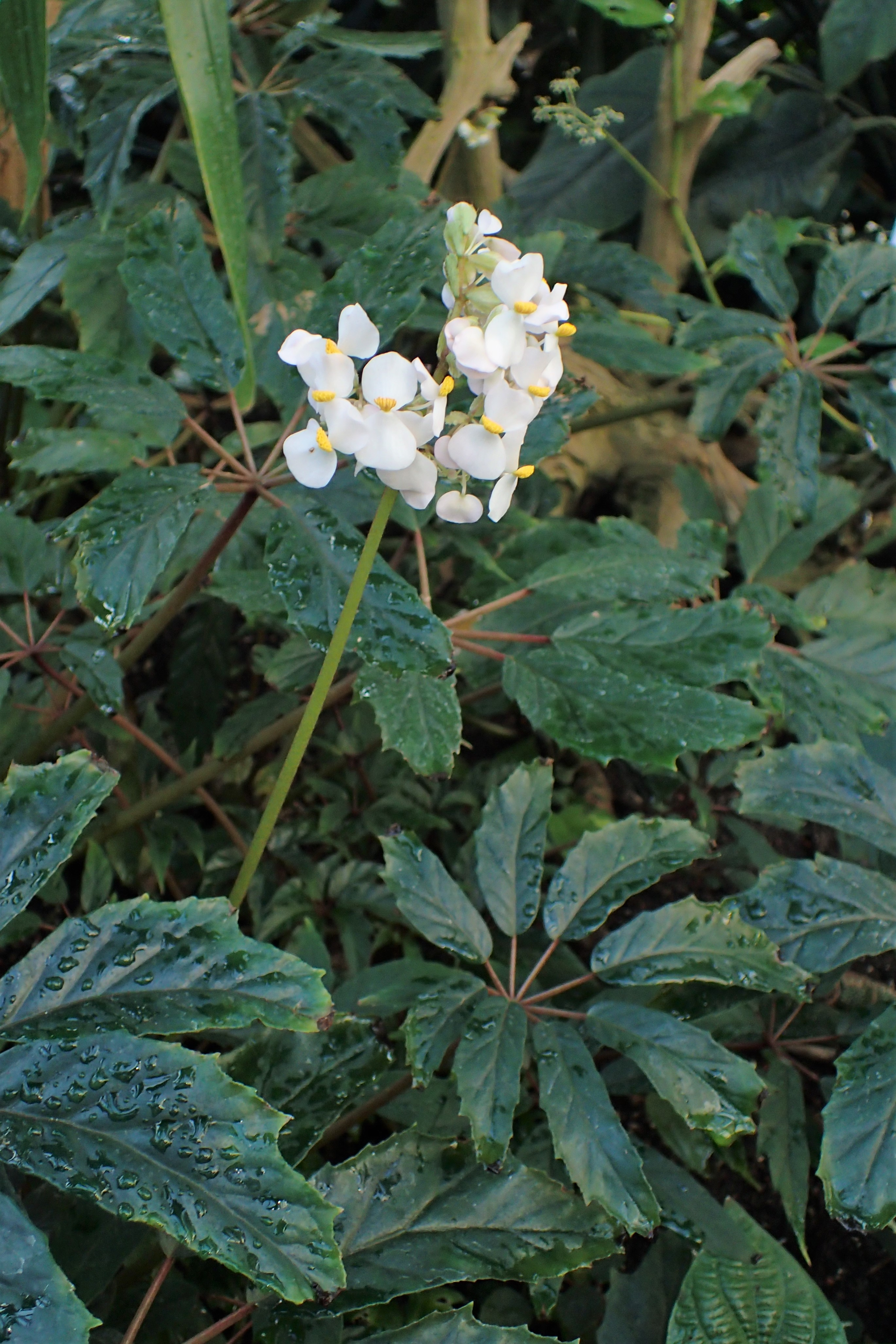

Scientific classification
- Kingdom: Plantae
- Clade: Tracheophytes
- Clade: Angiosperms
- Clade: Eudicots
- Clade: Rosids
- Order: Cucurbitales
- Family: Begoniaceae
- Genus: Begonia
- Species: B. carolineifolia

Binomial name
- Begonia carolineifolia Regel

Synonyms
- List: Begonia rotata Liebm.; Gireoudia carolineifolia (Regel) Klotzsch; Gireoudia rotata (Liebm.) Klotzsch

= Begonia carolineifolia =

Species of flowering plant

Begonia carolineifolia, the palm leaf begonia, palmate begonia or hand begonia, is a species of flowering plant in the genus Begonia native to central and southern Mexico and northern Central America. It has gained the Royal Horticultural Society's Award of Garden Merit.
