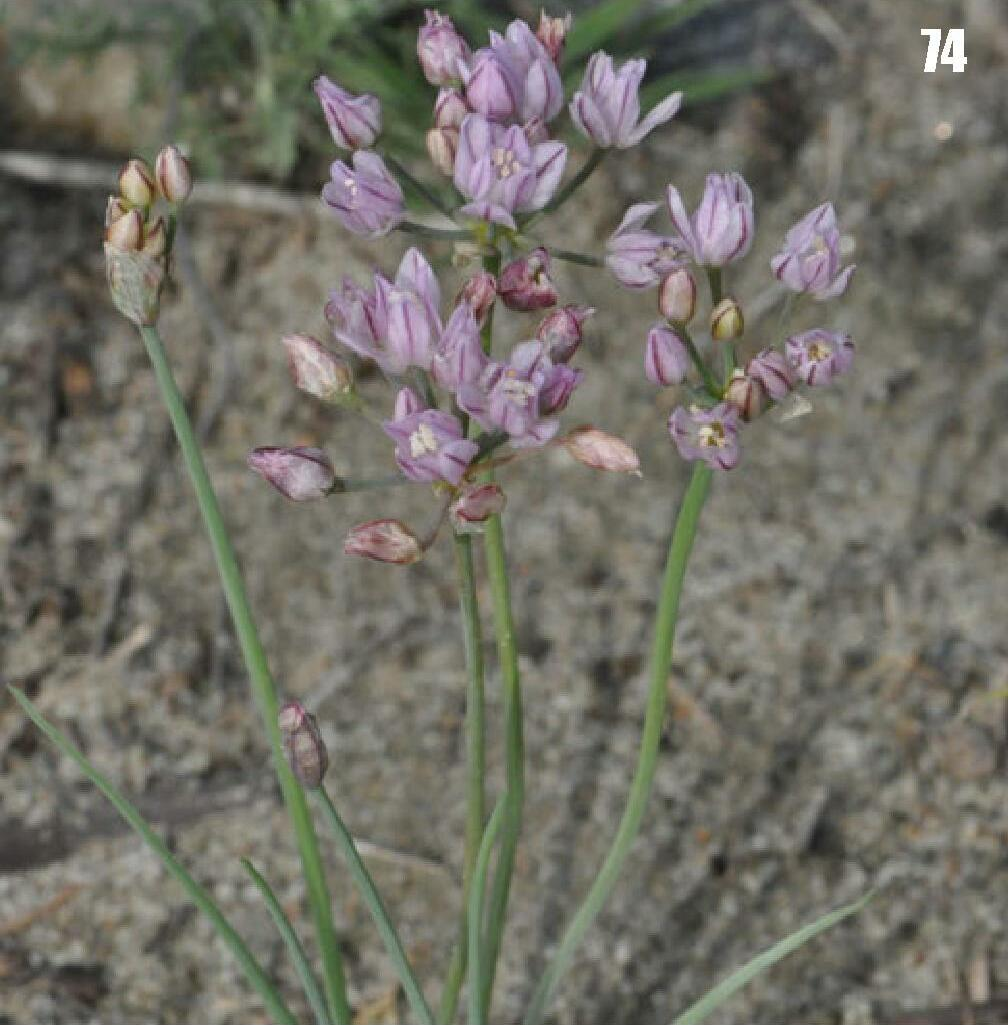

Scientific classification
- Kingdom: Plantae
- Clade: Tracheophytes
- Clade: Angiosperms
- Clade: Monocots
- Order: Asparagales
- Family: Amaryllidaceae
- Subfamily: Allioideae
- Genus: Allium
- Species: A. weschniakowii

Binomial name
- Allium weschniakowii Regel

= Allium weschniakowii =

Лук Вешнякова 坛丝韭 tan si jiu

Species of flowering plant

Allium weschniakowii is an Asian species of wild onion native to Xinjiang, Kazakhstan and Kyrgyzstan.

Allium weschniakowii has a cluster of narrow bulbs rarely more than 5 mm in diameter. Scape is rather short of the genus, only up to 16 cm tall. Leaves are tubular, shorter than the scape. Umbel has only a few red to violet flowers.
