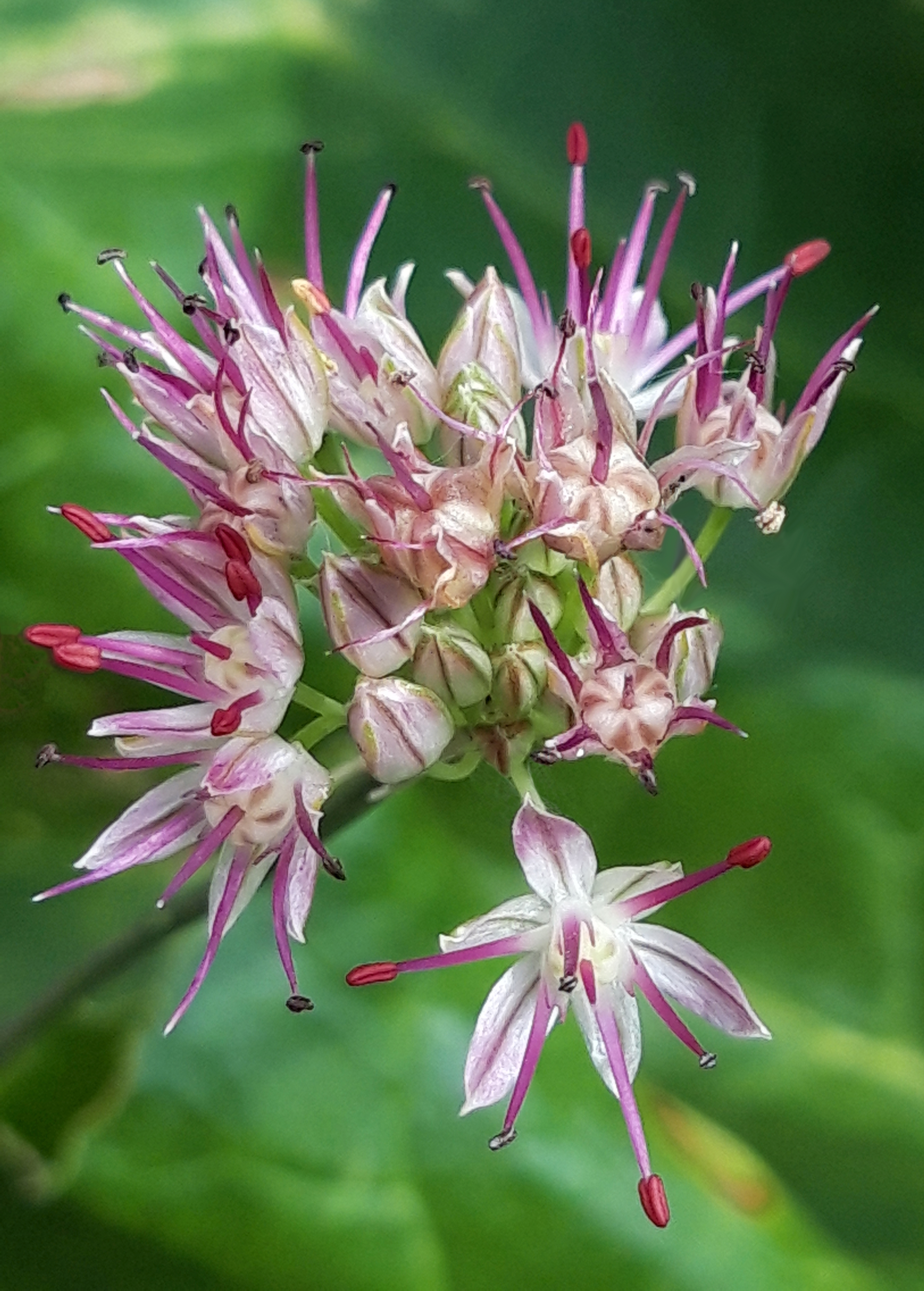

Scientific classification
- Kingdom: Plantae
- Clade: Tracheophytes
- Clade: Angiosperms
- Clade: Monocots
- Order: Asparagales
- Family: Amaryllidaceae
- Subfamily: Allioideae
- Genus: Allium
- Subgenus: Allium subg. Melanocrommyum
- Species: A. kokanicum

Binomial name
- Allium kokanicum Regel

Synonyms
- Allium caricoides Regel; Allium filifolium Regel; Allium hoeltzeri Regel

= Allium kokanicum =

Species of flowering plant

Allium kokanicum is an Old World bulb geophyte, native to mountains parts of Central Asia. It is a bulb-forming perennial up to 20 cm tall with pale red to pale purple flowers.

== Distribution ==
Allium kokanicum is found growing wild from northern Pakistan and northeast Afghanistan, throughout Pamirian Tajikistan, the Tian Shan of Kyrgyzstan and Xinjiang, to Altaic eastern Kazakhstan.
