= Allium filidens =

Scientific classification
- Kingdom: Plantae
- Clade: Tracheophytes
- Clade: Angiosperms
- Clade: Monocots
- Order: Asparagales
- Family: Amaryllidaceae
- Subfamily: Allioideae
- Genus: Allium
- Subgenus: A. subg. Allium
- Species: A. filidens

Binomial name
- Allium filidens Regel

Synonyms
- Allium karakense Regel; Allium ugami Vved.

Species of flowering plant

Allium filidens is a species of onion found at high elevations of central and south-central Asia. It is a bulb-forming perennial up to 45 cm tall, forming a hemispherical umbel of flowers; tepals white or pink with a purple midvein.

Subspecies

- Allium filidens subsp. filidens - Pakistan, Afghanistan, Kyrgyzstan, Uzbekistan, Tajikistan, Kazakhstan
- Allium filidens subsp. mogianense R.M.Fritsch & F.O.Khass. - Tajikistan
- Allium filidens subsp. ugami (Vved.) R.M.Fritsch & F.O.Khass. - Tajikistan
