= Allium kaschianum =

草地韭 cao di jiu

Scientific classification
- Kingdom: Plantae
- Clade: Tracheophytes
- Clade: Angiosperms
- Clade: Monocots
- Order: Asparagales
- Family: Amaryllidaceae
- Subfamily: Allioideae
- Genus: Allium
- Subgenus: A. subg. Polyprason
- Species: A. kaschianum

Binomial name
- Allium kaschianum Regel

Species of plant

Allium kaschianum is a plant species from Central Asia (Xinjiang, Kazakhstan and Kyrgyzstan). It is found at elevations of 2400–3000 m.

Allium kaschianum produces a cluster of narrow bulbs up to 15 mm in diameter. Scape is up to 40 cm tall. Leaves are flat, long and narrow, about the same length as the scape. The umbel has pale purple flowers.
