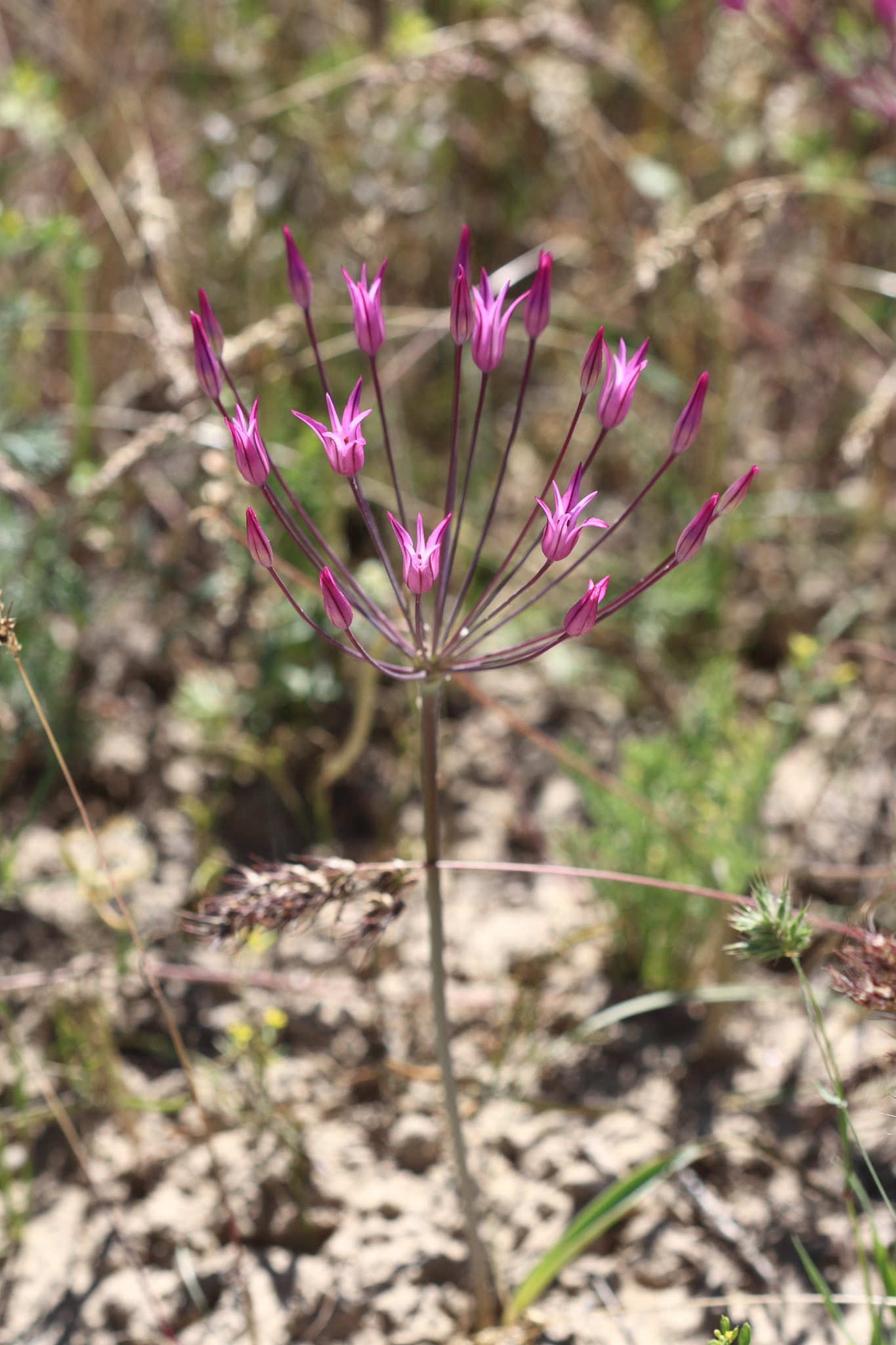

Scientific classification
- Kingdom: Plantae
- Clade: Embryophytes
- Clade: Tracheophytes
- Clade: Spermatophytes
- Clade: Angiosperms
- Clade: Monocots
- Order: Asparagales
- Family: Amaryllidaceae
- Subfamily: Allioideae
- Genus: Allium
- Subgenus: Allium subg. Melanocrommyum
- Species: A. iliense

Binomial name
- Allium iliense Regel

= Allium iliense =

Species of flowering plant

Allium iliense is a species of wild onion native to southeastern Kazakhstan. Living in sandy areas, its loose inflorescence can detach when ripe and roll in the wind, spreading seeds much further in the manner of a tumbleweed.
