= Allium chrysocephalum =

折被韭 zhe bei jiu

Scientific classification
- Kingdom: Plantae
- Clade: Tracheophytes
- Clade: Angiosperms
- Clade: Monocots
- Order: Asparagales
- Family: Amaryllidaceae
- Subfamily: Allioideae
- Genus: Allium
- Subgenus: A. subg. Polyprason
- Species: A. chrysocephalum

Binomial name
- Allium chrysocephalum Regel

Species of plant

Allium chrysocephalum is a plant species native to China, in the provinces Gansu, Qinghai, and Sichuan. It grows at elevations of 3400–4800 m.

Allium chrysocephalum produces narrow cylindrical bulbs about 10 mm in diameter. Scapes are up to 25 cm long, round in cross-section. Leaves are flat, up to 10 mm across, about half the length of the scapes. Flowers are bright yellow.
