= Allium herderianum =

金头韭 jin tou jiu

Scientific classification
- Kingdom: Plantae
- Clade: Tracheophytes
- Clade: Angiosperms
- Clade: Monocots
- Order: Asparagales
- Family: Amaryllidaceae
- Subfamily: Allioideae
- Genus: Allium
- Subgenus: A. subg. Polyprason
- Species: A. herderianum

Binomial name
- Allium herderianum Regel

Species of plant

Allium herderianum is a plant species native to Gansu and Qinghai in China. It grows in dry, sunlit locales at elevations of 2900–3900 meters.

Allium herderianum produces on egg-shaped bulb up to 15 mm across. Scape is up to 40 cm tall, round in cross-section. Umbels are crowded with many yellow flowers.
