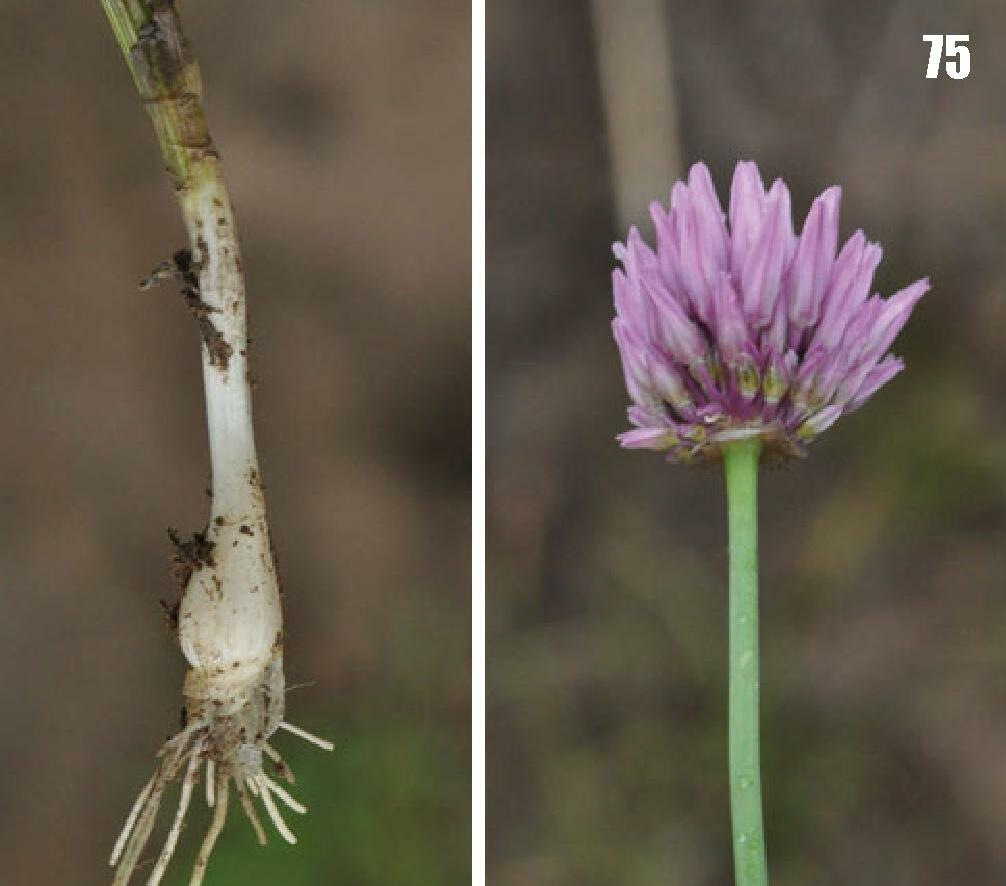

Scientific classification
- Kingdom: Plantae
- Clade: Tracheophytes
- Clade: Angiosperms
- Clade: Monocots
- Order: Asparagales
- Family: Amaryllidaceae
- Subfamily: Allioideae
- Genus: Allium
- Subgenus: Allium subg. Melanocrommyum
- Species: A. winklerianum

Binomial name
- Allium winklerianum Regel

= Allium winklerianum =

Species of flowering plant

Allium winklerianum is an Asian species of onion native to Xinjiang, Afghanistan, Tajikistan, Uzbekistan, Kyrgyzstan, and Tajikistan. It is also cultivated as an ornamental elsewhere because of the pretty flowers and also because of the strong lilac scent to the blooms.

Allium winklerianum has a round bulb up to 2 cm in diameter. Scape is up to 40 cm tall. Leaves are flat, shorter than the scape, up to 25 mm across. Umbel is hemispheric, with many flowers crowded together. Tepals are lilac-colored.
