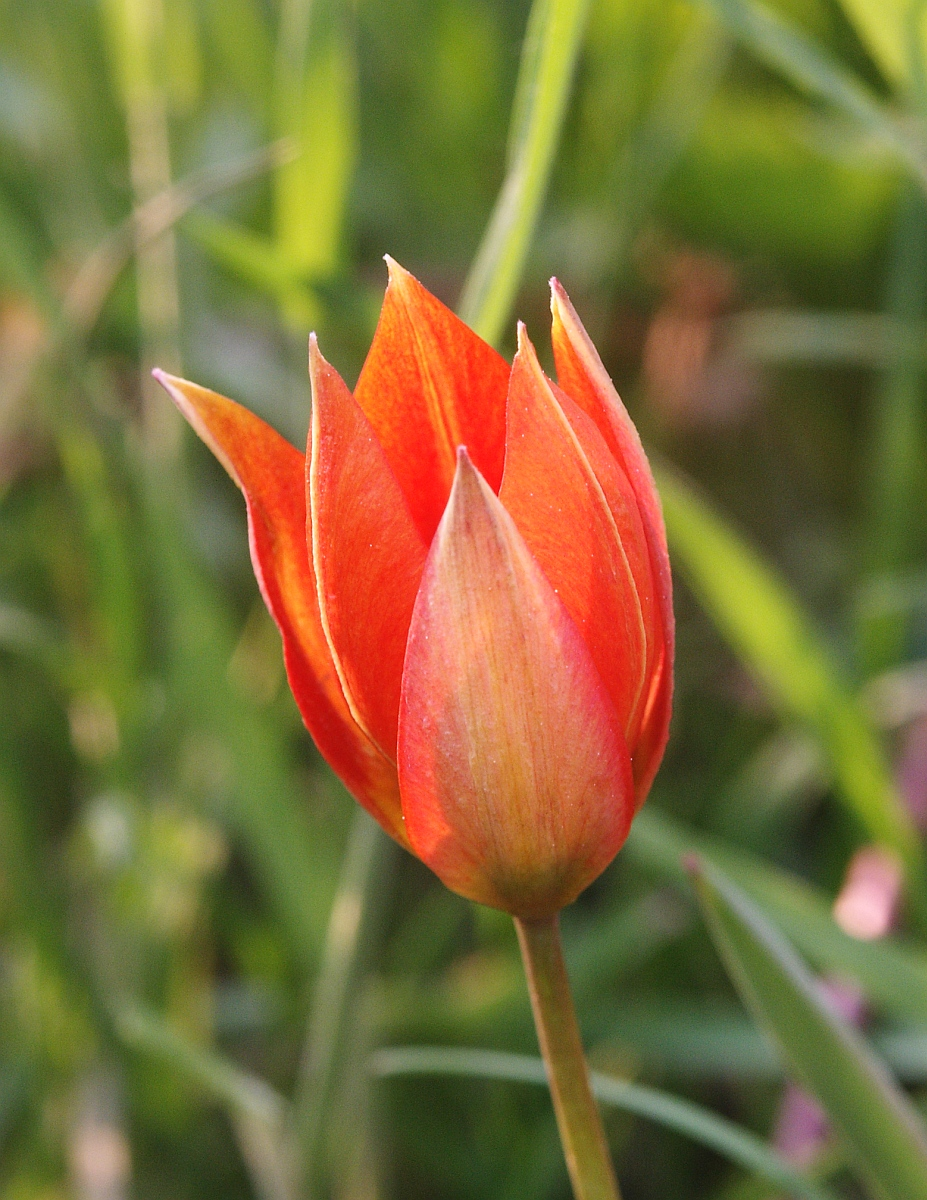

Scientific classification
- Kingdom: Plantae
- Clade: Embryophytes
- Clade: Tracheophytes
- Clade: Spermatophytes
- Clade: Angiosperms
- Clade: Monocots
- Order: Liliales
- Family: Liliaceae
- Subfamily: Lilioideae
- Genus: Tulipa
- Subgenus: Tulipa subg. Eriostemones
- Species: T. orphanidea

Binomial name
- Tulipa orphanidea Boiss. ex Heldr.

Synonyms
- Tulipa atheniensis Orph. Tulipa crocata Orph. Tulipa doerfleri Gand. Tulipa goulimyi Sealy & Turrill; Tulipa hageri Heldr. Tulipa hayatii O.Schwarz; Tulipa hellespontica Degen; Tulipa minervae Orph. ex Baker; Tulipa orphanidea subsp. doerfleri (Gand.) Zonn. Tulipa orphanidea subsp. whittalii (A.D.Hall) Zonn. Tulipa orphanidea var. whittallii (A.D.Hall) Dykes; Tulipa theophrasti Candargy; Tulipa thracica Davidov; Tulipa turcica Griseb. Tulipa whittallii A.D.Hall

= Tulipa orphanidea =

Species of flowering plant

Tulipa orphanidea is a species of flowering plant in the Liliaceae family. It was described by Pierre Edmond Boissier and Theodor Heinrich Hermann von Heldreich (1862).

== Description ==
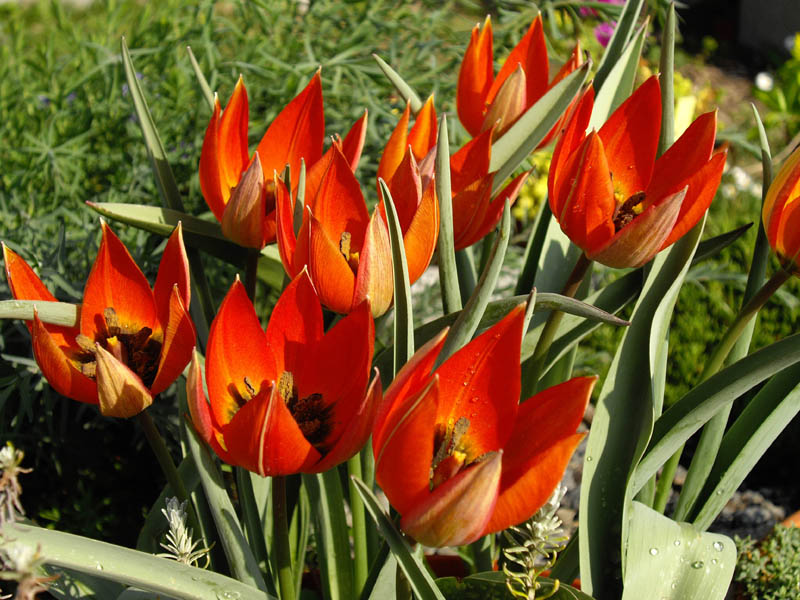

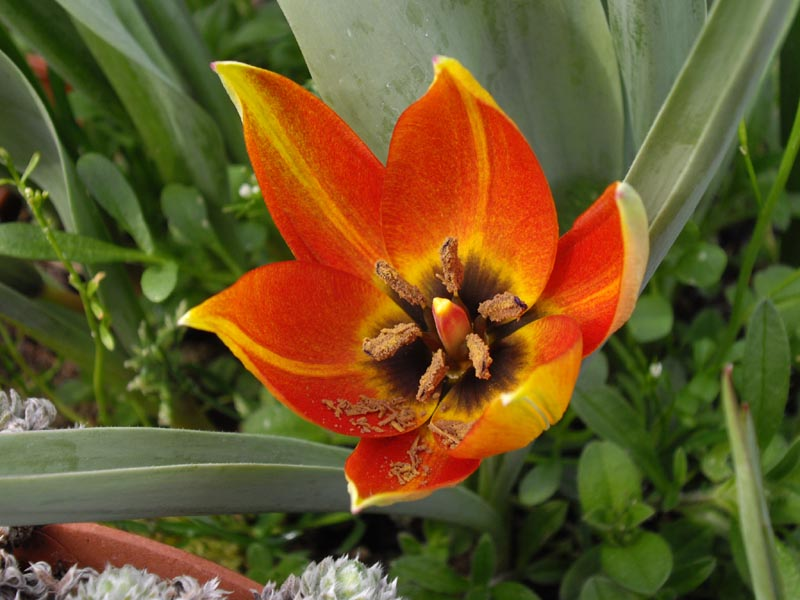
Basal blotch at inner centre of tepals

Tulipa orphanidea is a bulbous perennial reaching 10–20 cm (3.9–7.9 in) in height. Bulbs measure 20–47 x 8–22 mm. The stem is glabrous or hairy, and the leaves which vary from 2–7 reach a size of about 20x2 cm, and are green, often with a tinge of red along their edges. The stem bears 1–4 globular to star-shaped flowers with copper-red, rarely yellow and red tepals, arranged in two whorls of three. The tepals bear a black, sometimes yellow, basal blotch interiorly. The outer tepals measure 3–6 × 1–1.8 cm and the inner tepal 3–6 × 1.2–2.1 cm. The six stamens are a dark olive colour, 7–12 mm in length. The chromosome number is 2n = 36, rarely 24 or 48.

== Taxonomy ==
The taxonomy is complex, since it is a variable population. It is placed in subgenus Eriostemones, one of four subgenera of Tulipa. The species has at various times been treated as a variable taxon with a range of forms, divided into subspecies, including T. o. whittalii, or as a number of different discrete species, including T. bithynica, T. hageri and T. whittallii.

== Distribution and habitat ==
Tulipa orphanidea is found in the southeast Balkans, Bulgaria, Greece, Aegean Islands, Crete and western Turkey. Its habitat includes black pine (Pinus nigra) forests, fields and roadsides, at altitudes up to 1,700 m (5,600 ft). They only grow in tropical and temperate zones.

== Ecology ==
Tulipa orphanidea blooms from April to May.

== Cultivation ==
Tulipa orphanidea has been used s an ornamental garden plant since 1861. Different colour forms are stable in cultivation and various cultivars have been developed, and given Cultivar Group names such as T. orphanidea Hageri Group and Whittallii Group. Cultivars include T. orphanidea Hageri Group ‘Splendens’.

The Whittallii Group, with burnt orange inner tepals and a black blotch at the base of each tepal, has received the Royal Horticultural Society's Award of Garden Merit.

== Bibliography ==
- Grey-Wilson, C.; Matthews, V. A. (1964). Tulipa orphanidea Boiss. ex Heldr. Cambridge University Press. p. 22. ISBN 9780521201087., In Tutin et al (1980)
- Jäger, Eckehart J.; Ebel, Friedrich; Hanelt, Peter; Müller; Gerd (2007). Rothmaler - Exkursionsflora von Deutschland: 5. Krautige Zier- und Nutzpflanzen. Berlin, Heidelberg: Springer Science+Business Media. ISBN 978-3-662-50420-8.
- Tutin, T. G.; et al., eds. (1980). Flora Europaea. Volume 5, Alismataceae to Orchidaceae (monocotyledones). Cambridge, England: Cambridge University Press. ISBN 052120108X.
- Christenhusz, Maarten J.M.; Govaerts, Rafaël; David, John C.; Hall, Tony; Borland, Katherine; Roberts, Penelope S.; Tuomisto, Anne; Buerki, Sven; Chase, Mark W.; Fay, Michael F. (2013). "Tiptoe through the tulips – cultural history, molecular phylogenetics and classification of Tulipa (Liliaceae)". Botanical Journal of the Linnean Society. 172 (3): 280–328. doi:10.1111/boj.12061.
- Eker, İsmail; Babaç, Mehmet Tekin; Koyuncu, Mehmet (29 January 2014). "Revision of the genus Tulipa L. (Liliaceae) in Turkey". Phytotaxa. 157 (1): 001. doi:10.11646/phytotaxa.157.1.1.
- von Heldreich, Theodor (1862). "Tulipa orphanidea Boiss. und die Tulpen Griechenlands". Gartenflora. 11: 309311.
- "Tulipa orphanidea". World Checklist of Selected Plant Families. Royal Botanic Gardens, Kew.
- Govaerts, Rafael (2004). "Tulipa orphanidea". Catalogue of Life: 2014 Annual Checklist. Royal Botanic Gardens, Kew.
- "Tulipa orphanidea Boiss. ex Heldr". Tropicos: IPCN Chromosome Reports. Missouri Botanical Garden. 2017.
