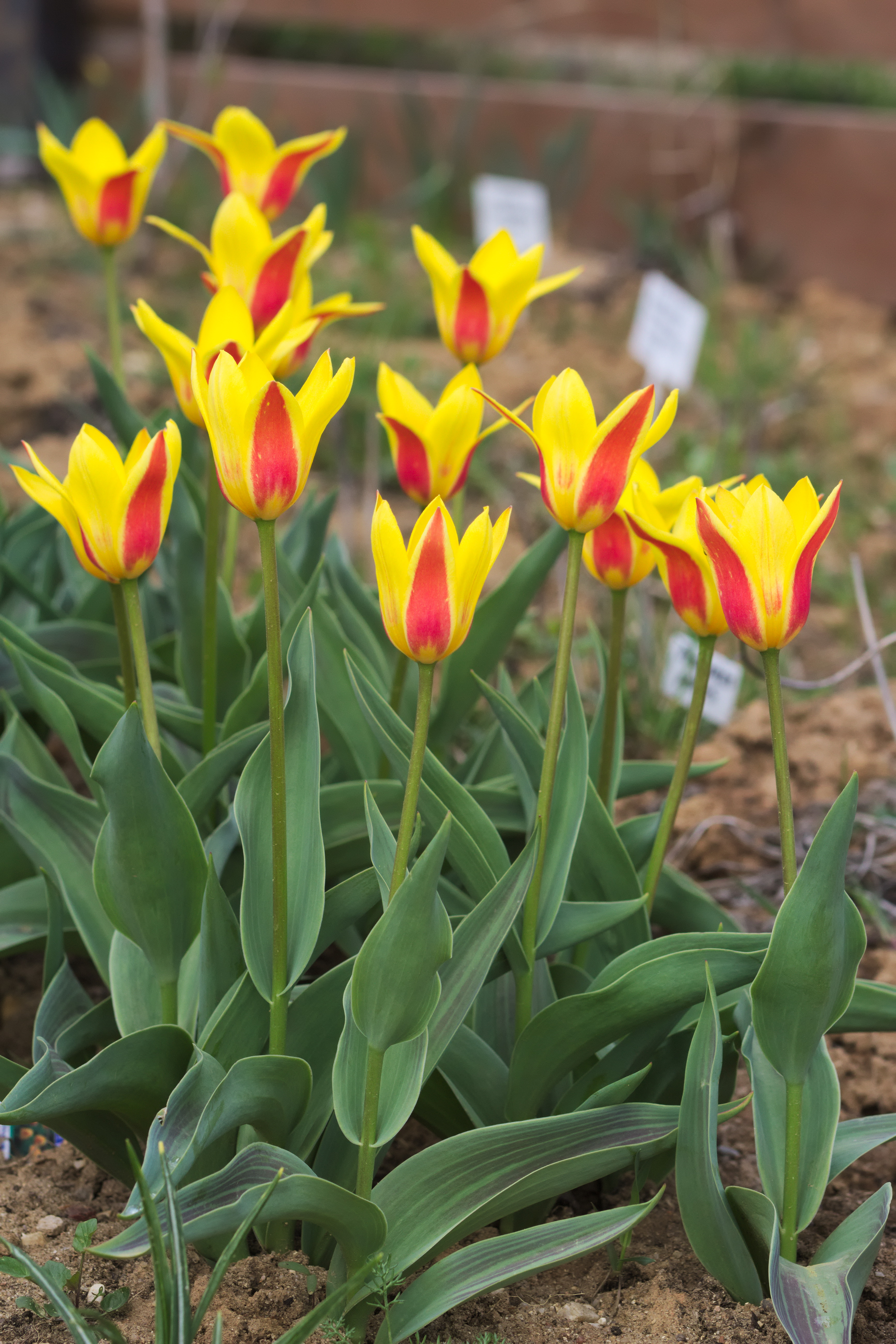
- Tulipa kaufmanniana 'Giuseppe Verdi'

Scientific classification
- Kingdom: Plantae
- Clade: Embryophytes
- Clade: Tracheophytes
- Clade: Angiosperms
- Clade: Monocots
- Order: Liliales
- Family: Liliaceae
- Subfamily: Lilioideae
- Genus: Tulipa
- Species: T. kaufmanniana

Binomial name
- Tulipa kaufmanniana Regel

Synonyms
- Tulipa berkariensis Rukšans

= Tulipa kaufmanniana =

Species of flowering plant

Tulipa kaufmanniana, the water lily tulip, is a species of tulip native to Central Asia.

== Description ==
The tulip has a short stem, 20–25 cm (8–10 in) long, making it a dwarf tulip.

It has lance shaped leaves which may be plain green, or blue-green. They also often have purple markings on their leaves.

It is one of the earliest tulips to bloom, between February and April.

The funnel-shaped flower, has six pointy petals that open out like a star similar to water lilies, hence the common name. They open very wide on sunny days. They usually have outermost petals with a different colour than interior petals. The long upright petals often have a flushed orange-red, red or purple flush on the back of the petal. Inside the petal, there may be a butter-yellow, or yellow blotch and sometimes with further red markings. There are also red, orange, pink and clear yellow forms too.

After it has flowered it will form seeds.

== Taxonomy ==
It is commonly known as the 'Water-lily Tulip'. because the petals of the flower open out like a star or waterlily.

The Latin specific epithet kaufmanniana refers to Konstantin von Kaufman (1818–1882), who was the first Governor-General of Russian Turkestan where the tulip was found.

It was first found in Turkestan, and then published and described by Eduard August von Regel in his botanical magazine Gartenflora Vol.26 on page 194 in 1877. It was also published by Regel in Act. Hort. Petrop. Vol.5. on page 265 in 1877.

== Distribution and habitat ==
Tulipa kaufmanniana is native to temperate areas of Central Asia. It has naturalised between southern Europe, North Africa, and Asia from Anatolia and Iran in the west to northeast of China.

=== Range ===
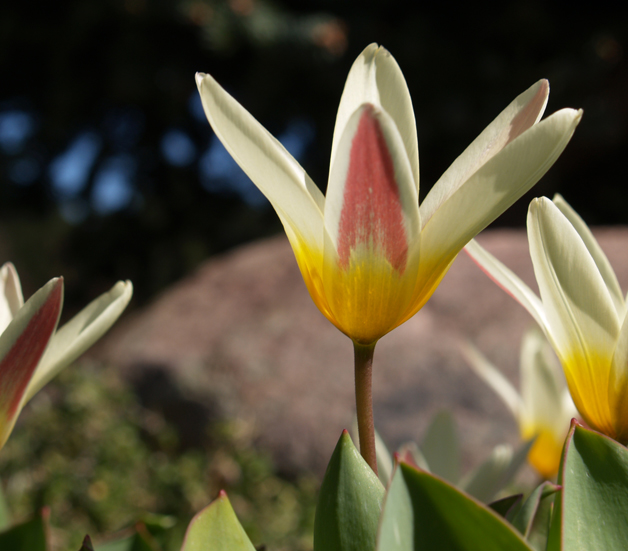
Tulipa kaufmanniana in the Botanical Garden, Copenhagen

It is found in Kyrgyzstan, Tajikistan and Kazakhstan.

As well as found on the mountains of Tien-Shan, the Pamir and Hindu Kush mountains.

=== Habitat ===
T. kaufmanniana grows in the wild on stony hillsides, and steppes.

== Cultivation ==
They are suitable to be grown in the rock garden, bed and borders. It is suitable for growing in USDA Growing Zones: 3 to 8, in full sun and soils with medium moisture retention or well-drained soils.

Seed germination of the tulip has been studied, and it was concluded that stratification for 7 weeks was more effective treatment on studied traits than 5 weeks. Moreover, cold stratification was a better treatment on breaking seed dormancy of the seeds.

== Cultivars ==
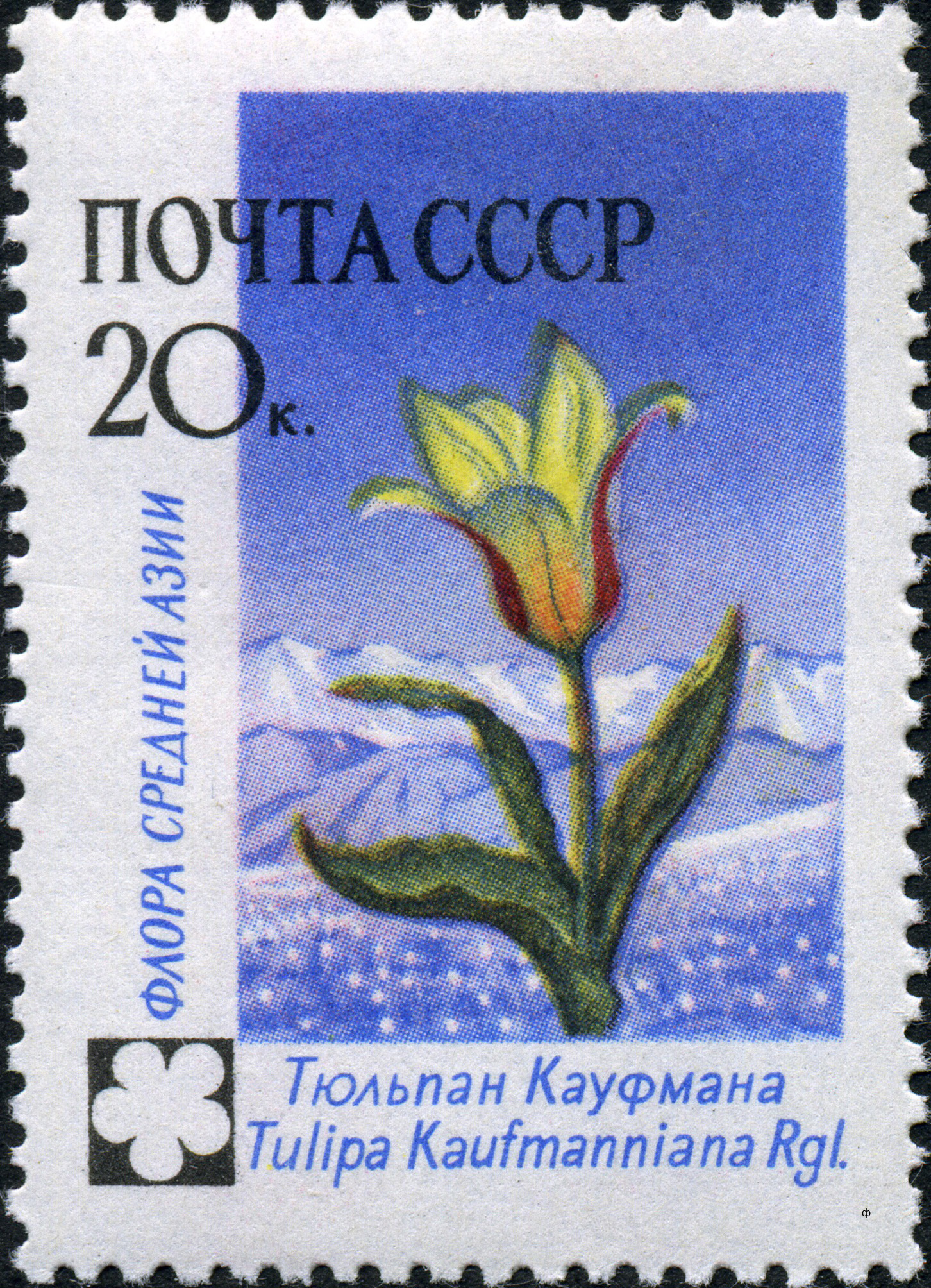
A Soviet Union postage stamp depicting Tulipa kaufmanniana

They and their hybrids are placed in Group 12, the Kaufmanniana Group, by the Royal Horticultural Society. Their leaves often have dashes and streaks of purple, which show the influence of Tulipa greigii in the breeding programmes.

It was given the First Class Certification by the Royal Horticultural Society in 1897.

The cultivars 'Ancilla', 'Early Harvest', 'Showwinner' (deep red) and 'Stresa' have gained the Royal Horticultural Society's Award of Garden Merit. Two other Group 12 cultivars are listed by the RHS as gaining the Award of Garden Merit, 'Alfred Cortot' and 'Glück'.

Other known hybrids include 'Heart's Delight', a soft pink with an orange-yellow eye, the clear yellow 'Chopin'. In America, common cultivars include; 'Ancilla' soft pink, red and white flowers, 'Johann Strauss' rosy red and sulfur yellow blooms and 'Stresa' golden yellow with carmine red flowers.

== Culture ==
In the 1960s, a postage stamp in CCCP (Russia), was issued with an image of the tulip. Then in 1993, a postage stamp in Uzbekistan, within the Flowers series was issued with an image of the tulip.

== Other sources ==
- Aldén, B., S. Ryman, & M. Hjertson. 2012. Svensk Kulturväxtdatabas, SKUD (Swedish Cultivated and Utility Plants Database; online resource) URL: www.skud.info
- Christenhusz, J. M.. et al. 2013. Tiptoe through the tulips - cultural history, molecular phylogenetics and classification of Tulipa (Liliaceae). Bot. J. Linn. Soc. 172:280-328.
- Encke, F. et al. 1993. Zander: Handwörterbuch der Pflanzennamen, 14. Auflage
- Groth, D. 2005. pers. comm. Note: re. Brazilian common names
- Huxley, A., ed. 1992. The new Royal Horticultural Society dictionary of gardening
- Komarov, V. L. et al., eds. 1934–1964. Flora SSSR.
- Liberty Hyde Bailey Hortorium. 1976. Hortus third.
- Marasek-Ciolakowska, A. et al. 2012. Breeding and cytogenetics in the genus Tulipa. Floriculture, Ornamental and plant biotechnology: Advances and topical issues. Volumes I-V. Global Science Books., London. 6(Special issue):90-97.
- Mathew, B. F. 1996. pers. comm. Note: re. common names
- Raamsdonk, L. W. D. van & T. de Vries. 1995. Species relationships and taxonomy in Tulipa subg. Tulipa (Liliaceae). Pl. Syst. Evol. 195:41.
- Walters, S. M. et al., eds. 1986–2000. European garden flora.
