= Tulipa dubia =

Conservation status
- Near Threatened (IUCN 3.1)

Scientific classification
- Kingdom: Plantae
- Clade: Tracheophytes
- Clade: Angiosperms
- Clade: Monocots
- Order: Liliales
- Family: Liliaceae
- Subfamily: Lilioideae
- Tribe: Lilieae
- Genus: Tulipa
- Species: T. dubia

Binomial name
- Tulipa dubia Vved.

Species of plant

Tulipa dubia, the Dubian tulip, is a species of flowering plant in the family Liliaceae. It is native to Central Asia, where it is found growing in only 25 to 35 stations. A bulbous geophyte reaching 20 cm (8 in), its yellow flowers have orange markings. It produces a natural hybrid species, Tulipa × tschimganica, with Tulipa kaufmanniana.

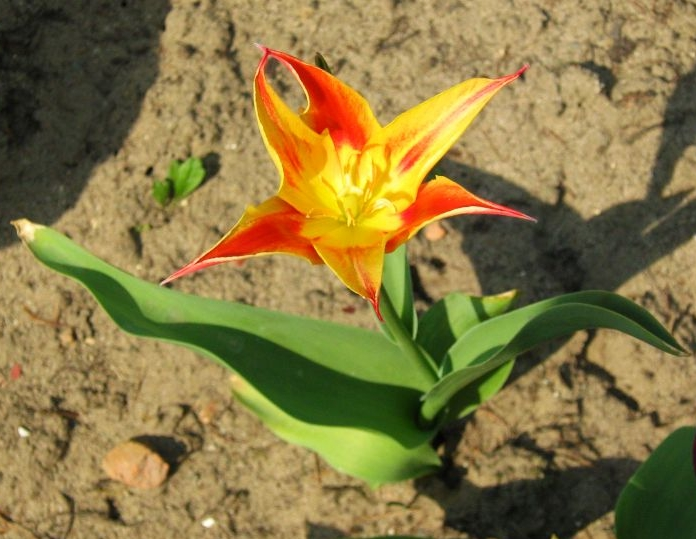
Tulipa × tschimganica
