= Kazpost =

National postal service of Kazakhstan

- Industry: Post
- Founded: 1993
- Headquarters: Astana, Kazakhstan
- Key people: Asel Zhanasova (Board Chairman)
- Products: Postal service, Financial services, Banking
- Operating income: 3 168 926 000 KZT (01 October 2017)
- Parent: Samruk-Kazyna
- Website: qazpost.kz

Old logo

Kazpost (Kazakh: “Qazpoşta” Aktsionerlik Qoğamy, «Қазпошта» акционерлік қоғамы) is the national postal service of Kazakhstan.

== History ==
=== Independent Kazakhstan ===
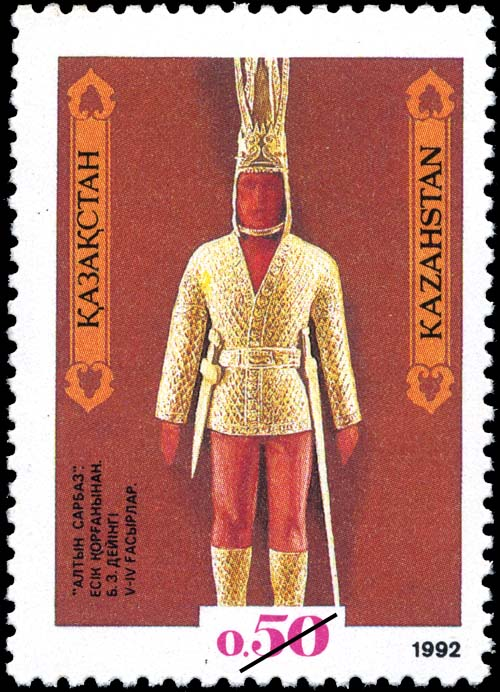
50-kopeck stamp of 1992, Kazakhstan's first stamp after independence

Kazakhstan has been a member of the Universal Postal Union since 1992. On April 5, 1993 according to the Cabinet of Kazakhstan, the communications industry of the Republic of Kazakhstan were divided into mail and telecommunications to improve management structures. In November 1995 the State -mail had become an independent economic entity, transforming itself into a Republican state enterprise Post services.

In the summer of 1999, a radical reform of mail began after the decision by the Government of Kazakhstan on May 27, 1999, to implement measures to stabilize the financial health of the postal industry. On December 20, 1999, RGPPS was transformed into a joint-stock company Kazpost entirely owned by the state. It was registered with a total capital of 903.66 million tenge initial registered capital of the company was formed only in the form of buildings and equipment. The situation was aggravated by a severe financial condition of the postal industry - RGPPS payable for the period from 1993 to 2000, before the pension funds, wages and taxes was 140 million tenge, the amount of accumulated losses from previous years over the years amounted to more than 250.6 million tenge.

Development Programme of the postal industry and the formation of the postal savings system of 2000–2003, laid the foundation in Kazakhstan postal savings system based on the retail network of post offices. As a source of funding for its implementation has served the Islamic Development Bank loan in the amount of U.S. $9 million under the state guarantees, domestic bond issue in the amount of 1.4 billion tenge, as well as a steady increase in the government of the authorized capital of the company. Kazakhstan was the first country in the CIS developed postal savings system. Results of Operations KazPost to create a full postal savings system were found to be successful Regional Commonwealth of Communications.

In October 2006, in Alma-Ata was established enterprise Elektronpost.kz for providing logistics information, including printing and mailing konvertovaniya.

== See also ==
- Postage stamps and postal history of Kazakhstan
- Media of Kazakhstan
- Communications in Kazakhstan
