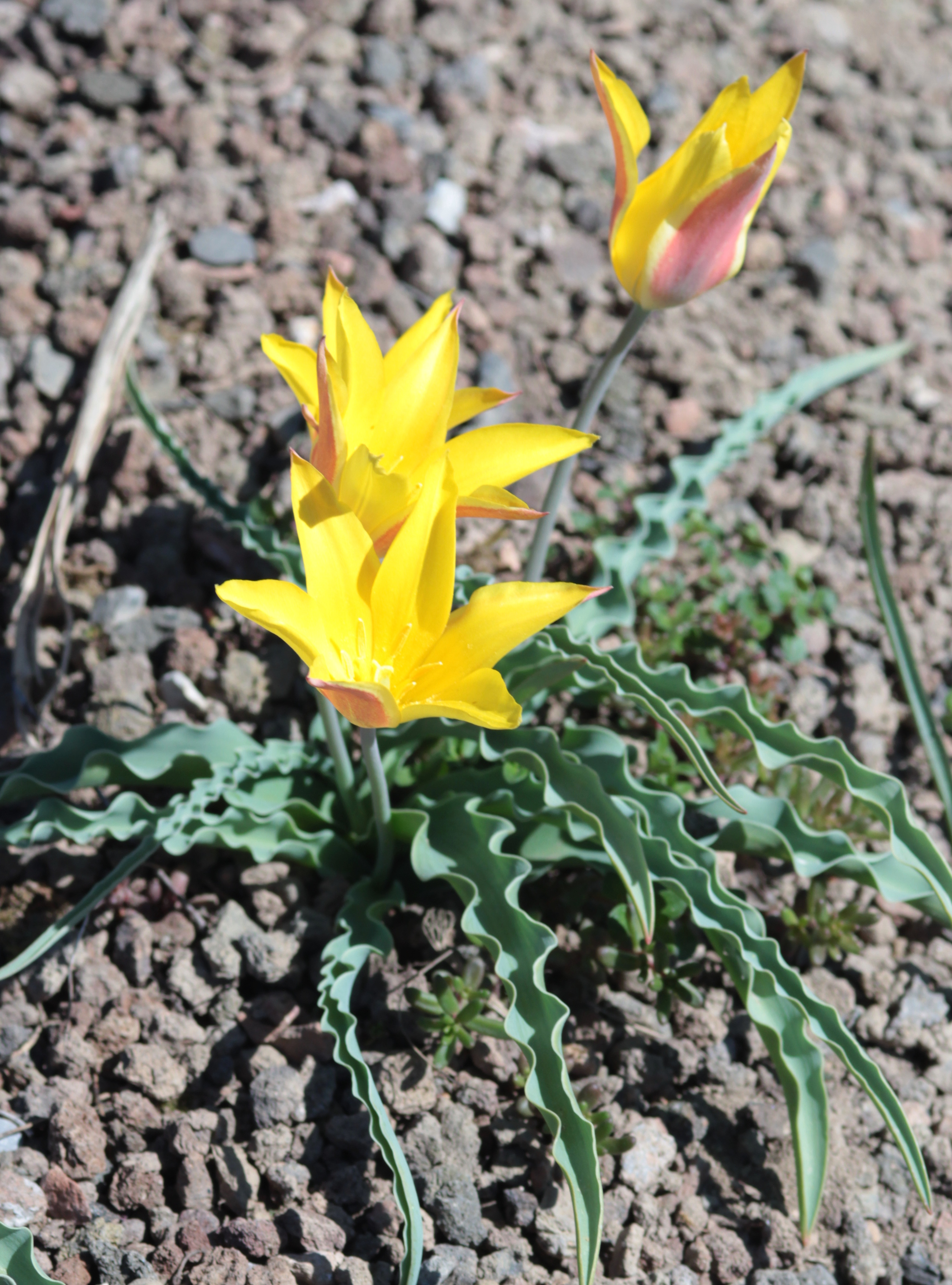

Scientific classification
- Kingdom: Plantae
- Clade: Tracheophytes
- Clade: Angiosperms
- Clade: Monocots
- Order: Liliales
- Family: Liliaceae
- Subfamily: Lilioideae
- Genus: Tulipa
- Species: T. kolpakowskiana

Binomial name
- Tulipa kolpakowskiana Regel

Synonyms
- Tulipa aristata Regel; Tulipa borszczowii Baker; Tulipa dykesiana Vved.; Tulipa triphylla Regel

= Tulipa kolpakowskiana =

Species of flowering plant

Tulipa kolpakowskiana, or Kolpakowsky's tulip, is a species of tulip native to Afghanistan, Kazakhstan, Kyrgyzstan, and Xinjiang in China. Its petals display a floral iridescence which is perceived by bumblebees. It has gained the Royal Horticultural Society's Award of Garden Merit. Its ultimate height and spread range from 0.1 to 0.5 metres and 0 to 0.1 metres, respectively.
