= Johann Albert von Regel =

Johann Albert von Regel (Russian: Иоанн-Альберт Регель; 12 December 1845, Zürich – 6 July 1908, Odessa) was a Swiss-Russian physician and botanist. He was the son of botanist Eduard August von Regel (1815–1892).

He studied medicine in Saint Petersburg, Göttingen, Vienna and Dorpat, afterwards being appointed district physician in Kuldja, Russian East Turkestan. From 1877 to 1885, he conducted botanical excursions in Turkestan and in the Pamir region of Central Asia. Specimens from these trips were delivered to the Saint Petersburg Botanical Garden.

In 1877, Tulipa alberti which was originally found in Turkestan, was named in his honor by Eduard August von Regel, and then it was described and published in Trudy Imp. S.-Peterburgsk. Bot. Sada Vol. 5 on page 264.

In 1891, the genus Aregelia (syn: Nidularium, family: Bromeliaceae) was named in his honor by Otto Kuntze.

== Publications ==
- Beitrag zur Geschichte des Schierlings und Wasserschierlings. - Moskau, 1877. Digitalisierte Ausgabe der Universitäts- und Landesbibliothek Düsseldorf.
- Reisen in Central-Asien, 1876-79. In: Dr. A. Petermann's Mittheilungen aus Justus Perthes' Geographischer Anstalt; 25. Band, 1879, S.376-384 und 408-417. Justus Perthes, Gotha 1879
- Meine Expedition nach Turfan 1879. In: Dr. A. Petermann's Mittheilungen aus Justus Perthes' Geographischer Anstalt; 27. Band, 1881, S.380-394. Justus Perthes, Gotha 1881.
