= Tulipa ulophylla =

Scientific classification
- Kingdom: Plantae
- Clade: Tracheophytes
- Clade: Angiosperms
- Clade: Monocots
- Order: Liliales
- Family: Liliaceae
- Subfamily: Lilioideae
- Tribe: Lilieae
- Genus: Tulipa
- Species: T. ulophylla

Binomial name
- Tulipa ulophylla Wendelbo

Synonyms
- Tulipa wendelboi Matin & Iranshahr

Species of plant

Tulipa ulophylla is a species of flowering plant in the family Liliaceae. It is native to the Alborz mountains of Iran. A bulbous geophyte, it is found at elevations from 600 to 2,500 m (2,000 to 8,200 ft). One of the so-called species tulips, it is not available from commercial suppliers.
