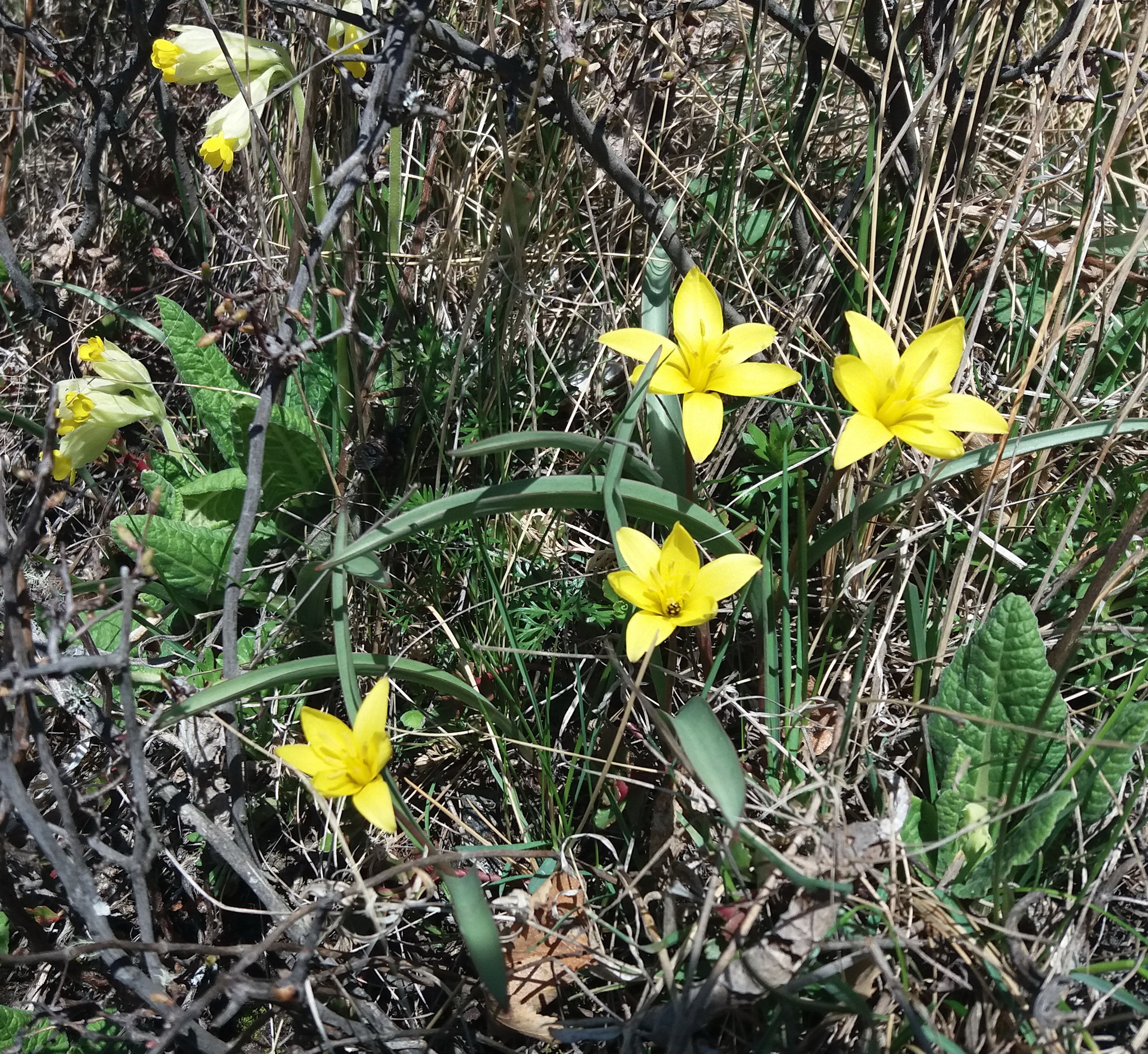

Scientific classification
- Kingdom: Plantae
- Clade: Tracheophytes
- Clade: Angiosperms
- Clade: Monocots
- Order: Liliales
- Family: Liliaceae
- Subfamily: Lilioideae
- Genus: Tulipa
- Species: T. uniflora

Binomial name
- Tulipa uniflora (L.) Besser ex Baker

= Tulipa uniflora =

Species of plant

Tulipa uniflora is a flowering plant species belonging to the genus Tulipa, within the family Liliaceae.

It was first described by Carl Linnaeus in 1770.

== Description ==
Tulipa uniflora is a perennial plant growing from a bulb. The bulbs are brown and range from 1 - 2cm in diameter. Leaves of this species are narrow, green and linear. Each bulb can sprout a single small flower. Petals are yellow, however the outer side of the petals have a purple tint. The style of each flower is less than 1mm long. Flowers sit on the top of glabrous stems, which range from 10 - 20cm tall.

== Distribution ==
Tulipa uniflora is native in the following locations: Siberia, Mongolia, Xinjiang, Inner Mongolia and Kazakhstan.

== Habitat ==
It can be found growing on rocky slopes and mountain sides at altitudes up to 2400 m.
