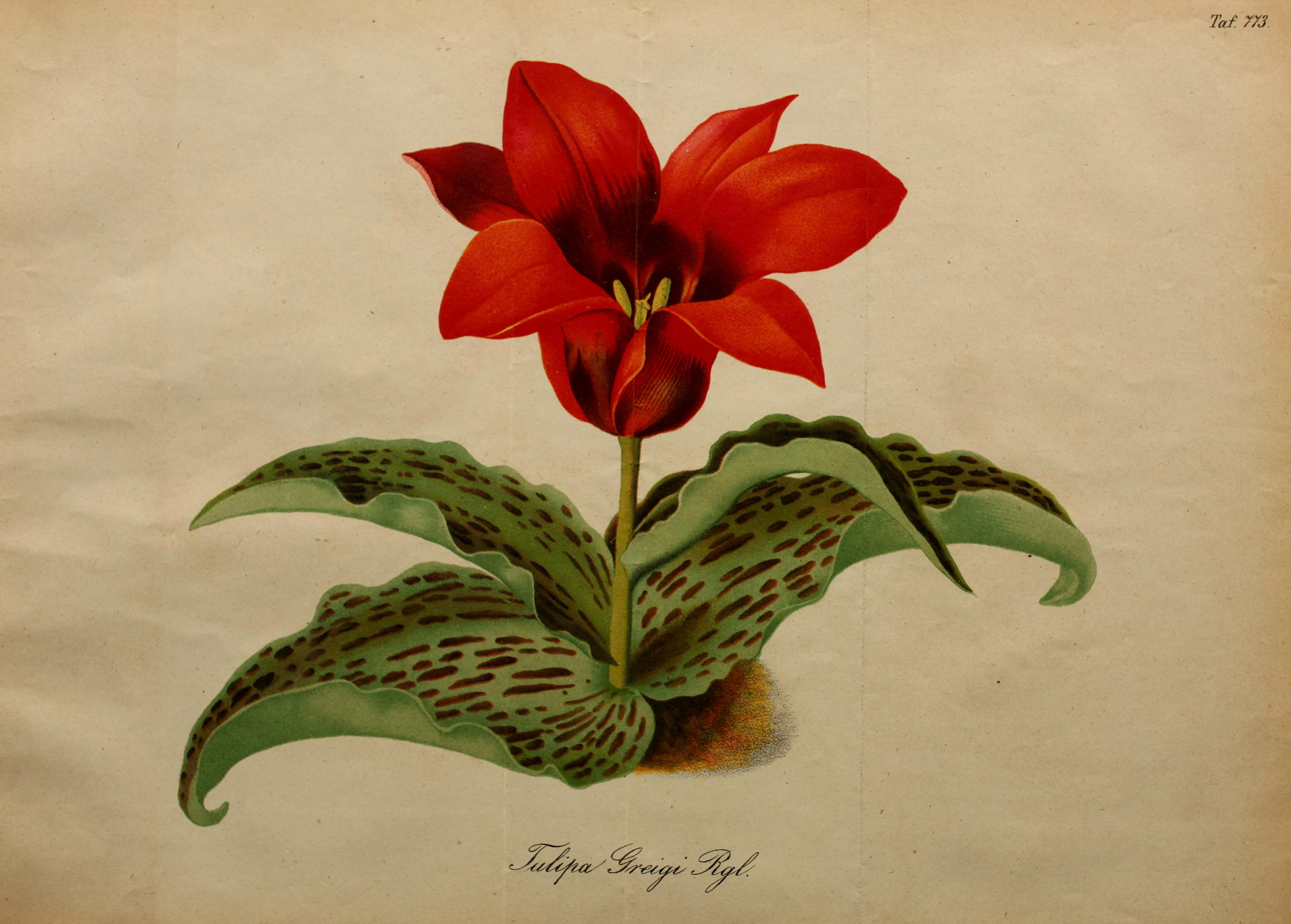
- Botanical illustration

Scientific classification
- Kingdom: Plantae
- Clade: Embryophytes
- Clade: Tracheophytes
- Clade: Angiosperms
- Clade: Monocots
- Order: Liliales
- Family: Liliaceae
- Subfamily: Lilioideae
- Genus: Tulipa
- Species: T. greigii

Binomial name
- Tulipa greigii Regel

Synonyms
- List: Tulipa karatavica (Regel) Vved. ex Lipsch.; Tulipa krauseana Regel; Tulipa mogoltavica Popov & Vved.

= Tulipa greigii =

Species of flowering plant

Tulipa greigii, (Greig's tulip) is a species of tulip native to Central Asia and Iran.

== Taxonomy ==
The Latin specific epithet greigi honors the Russian Samuel Greig, (1735–1788, "Father of the Russian navy") due to Greig once being president of the Russian Horticultural Society.

This tulip species was originally found in Turkestan, and then published and described by Eduard August von Regel in Gartenflora Vol.22 on page 290 in 1873.

== Description ==
Tulipa greigii typically grows 8–12 in (20–30 cm) tall, they have single flowers with a bowl-like shape, blooming in early to mid-spring. They also have spotted and striped leaves and the flowers are quite large, up to 4 in (102 mm) wide. The blooms are more limited in colour shades than with other tulips, ranging from red and yellow to white.

It is known for its variegated green and purple-maroon leaves. Its cultivars 'Oratorio', 'Plaisir', 'Red Riding Hood', 'Toronto', and 'United States' have gained the Royal Horticultural Society's Award of Garden Merit.

It was featured on a Soviet postage stamp in 1960.

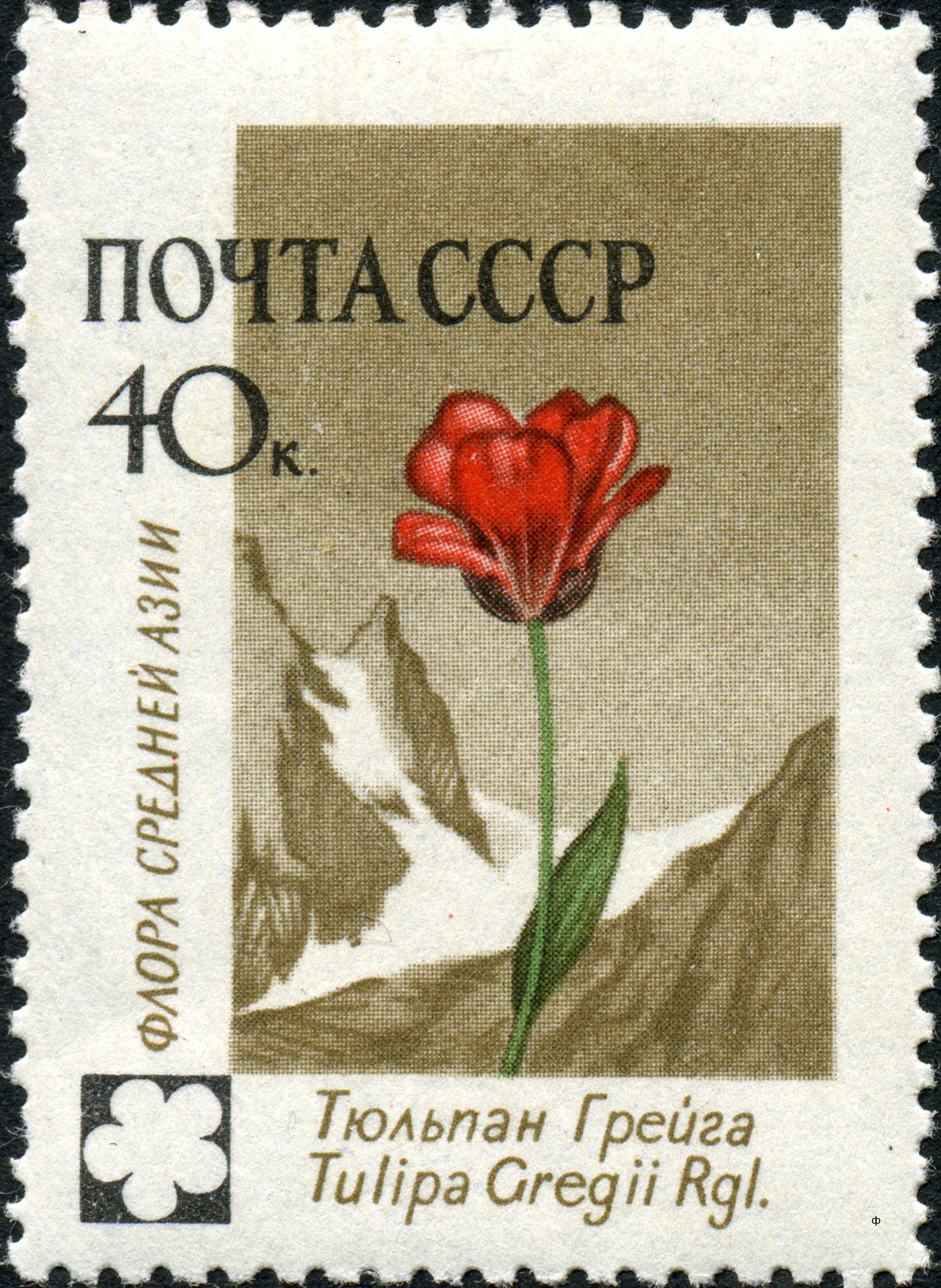
Soviet stamp from 1960
