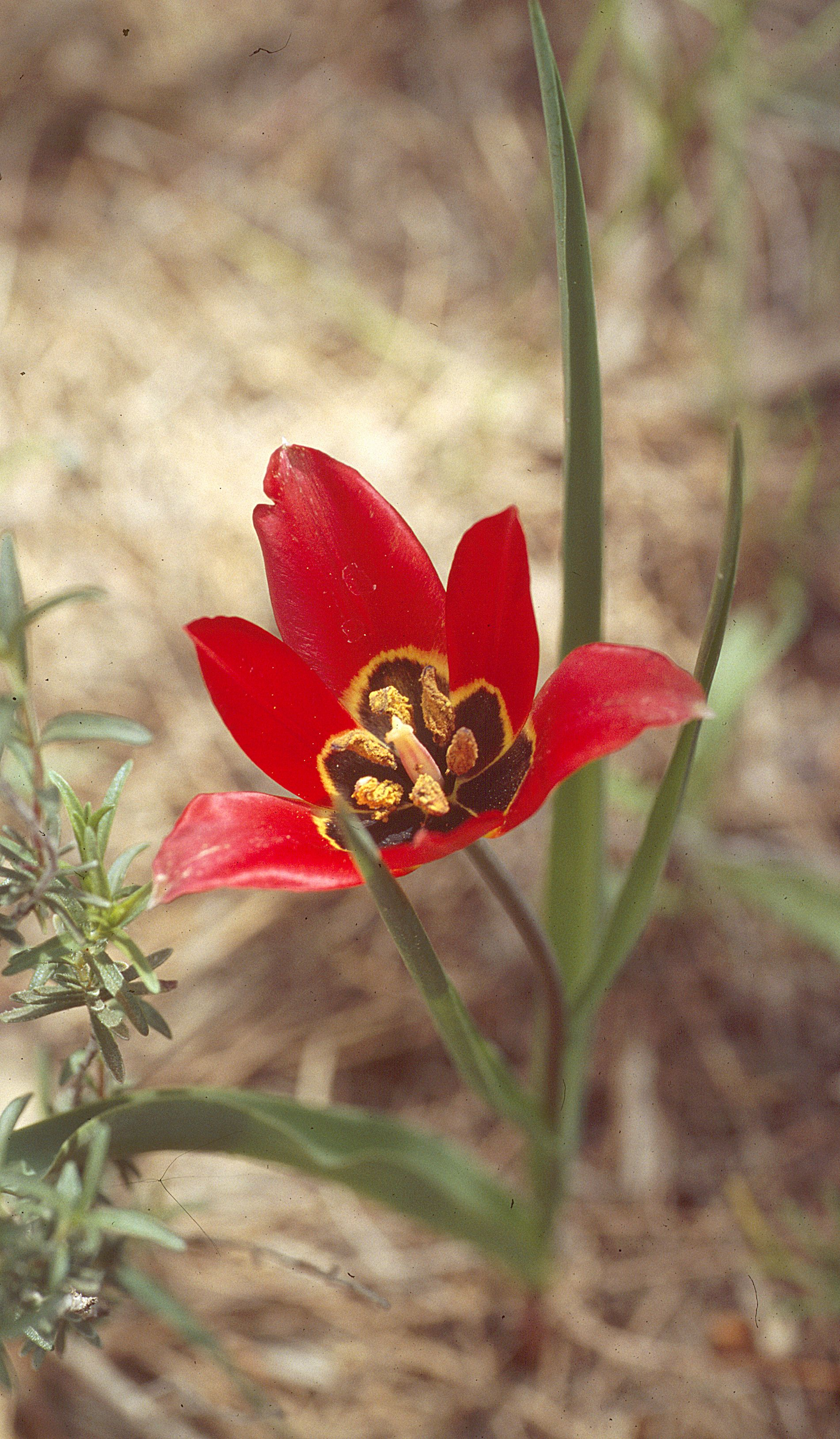

Scientific classification
- Kingdom: Plantae
- Clade: Embryophytes
- Clade: Tracheophytes
- Clade: Spermatophytes
- Clade: Angiosperms
- Clade: Monocots
- Order: Liliales
- Family: Liliaceae
- Subfamily: Lilioideae
- Genus: Tulipa
- Subgenus: Tulipa subg. Tulipa
- Species: T. armena

Binomial name
- Tulipa armena Boiss.

Synonyms
- Synonymy: Tulipa confusa Gabrieljan; Tulipa galatica Freyn; Tulipa karabachensis Grossh.; Tulipa lutea Freyn; Tulipa mucronata Fomin; Tulipa willmottiae Freyn; Tulipa gesneriana var. minor Boiss.; Tulipa armena f. galatica (Freyn) Raamsd.

= Tulipa armena =

Species of flowering plant

Tulipa armena is a species of flowering plant in the Liliaceae family. It is referred to by the common name Armenian tulip, and is native to the historical Armenian Highlands as the name implies; current regions of Armenia, modern day Turkey, Iran, South Caucasus, and Azerbaijan.

== Description ==
Tulipa armena is extremely variable. The bulb has a papery tunic that is not very hairy. The stems are between 8 and 25 cm (3.1 and 9.8 in) long, the 3–6 leaves are broad, scimitar-shaped, hairy or smooth and often have wavy edges. They are grey-green, but with a red overlay. They can be up to 20 cm (7.9 in) long. The large solitary flowers are cup- or bowl-shaped and very variable. Some are red with a dark violet, black or dark green basal blotch, sometimes striped and mottled in yellow, others yellow, in the red form, sometimes the black basal blotch has a yellow border. The tepals are normally oval. The filaments are black or blackish purple, the anthers yellow or black.

Tulipa armena is placed in the subgenus Tulipa. In Turkey, the subspecies lycica and armena are differentiated by the hairs on the bulb.

Tulipa armena is easily confused with Tulipa julia, which has a hairier tunic.

== Habitat ==
The Armenian tulip was found from Northeast Turkey through Transcaucasia (Armenia, Azerbaijan and Georgia) to northwestern Iran. It grows on alpine meadows and grasslands at moderate to high elevation, rocky mountain slopes between 1,000–2,700 m (3,300–8,900 ft) ASL, and especially in steppe areas on alkalic soils with a high humus content. It also occurs on the Marmaris peninsula in Southwestern Turkey at much lower elevations.

== Synonyms ==
Tulipa armena was first described by Edmund Boissier in 1859, the locus typicus is located in Northeast Turkey. Populations found in the Karabakh mountain range in Armenia and Azerbaijan have been called T. karabachensis, but this is regarded as a synonym of T. armena. Plants from Eastern Turkey and Northwest Iran with a hairy tunic and longer stems have been described as T. willmottiae Freyn. T. mucronata Fomin, T. karabachensis Grossh. pro parte, T. confusa Gabrielian may also be synonyms of T. armena. The name T. galatica has been used for the yellow variety without basal blotch. In contrast, Tulipa gumusanica has been confirmed as a separate species.

== Uses ==
The Armenian tulip is used as a garden plant. It needs dry, hot summers and should be grown in free draining soil and full sun. It flowers between April and June; in England, it flowers in April.

== Sources ==
- Pavord, Anna (1999). The Tulip. Bloomsbury. ISBN 978-0-7475-4296-4. OCLC 756352325.
- Wilford, Richard (2006). Tulips: species and hybrids for the gardener. Timber Press. ISBN 978-0-88192-763-4. OCLC 938201855.
