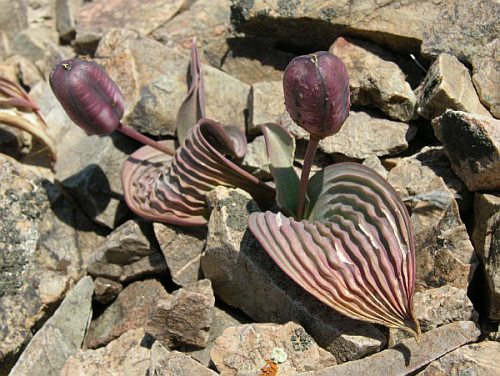

Scientific classification
- Kingdom: Plantae
- Clade: Embryophytes
- Clade: Tracheophytes
- Clade: Spermatophytes
- Clade: Angiosperms
- Clade: Monocots
- Order: Liliales
- Family: Liliaceae
- Subfamily: Lilioideae
- Tribe: Lilieae
- Genus: Tulipa
- Species: T. regelii

Binomial name
- Tulipa regelii Krasn.

= Tulipa regelii =

Species of flowering plant

Tulipa regelii, the plicate tulip or Regel's tulip, is a species of tulip native to southeast Kazakhstan. Rare, growing only in certain dry, rocky areas in the Chu-Ili Range, a northern subrange of the Tian Shan range, it is a very distinctive species with bizarre plicate leaves, usually only one, occasionally two. The species was first formally named by Russian botanist and geographer Andrej Nikolaevich Krasnov. It flowers in April.

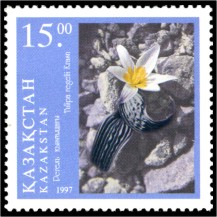
On a postage stamp of Kazakhstan
