= Gartenflora =

German botanical magazine

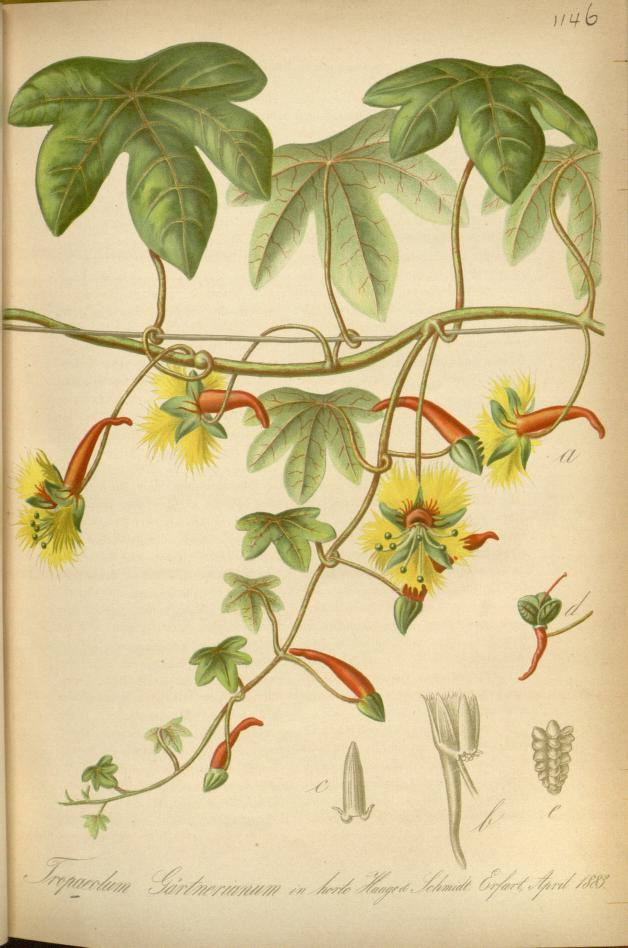
Tropaeolum sanctae-catharinae Sparre

Gartenflora was a German illustrated botanical magazine published in the period 1852–1940.

== History ==
Founded in 1852 and edited by Eduard von Regel, the botanist and future director of the Saint Petersburg Botanical Garden, the magazine appeared on a monthly basis. It was first published in Erlangen by Ferdinand Enke. Eduard von Regel left the editorial post in 1885.

== Title ==
The publication was titled:

Gartenflora: Allgemeine Monatschrift fur deutsche, russische und schweizerische Garten- und Blumenkunde. Unter Mitwerkung vieler Botaniker und Gartner Deutschlands, Russlands und der Schweiz.
Gartenflora: General Monthly Magazine for German, Russian and Swiss horticulture and botany. With contributions from many German, Russian and Swiss botanists and horticulturists.

== See also ==
- Garden Culture
