= Eduard August von Regel =

German botanist (1815–1892)

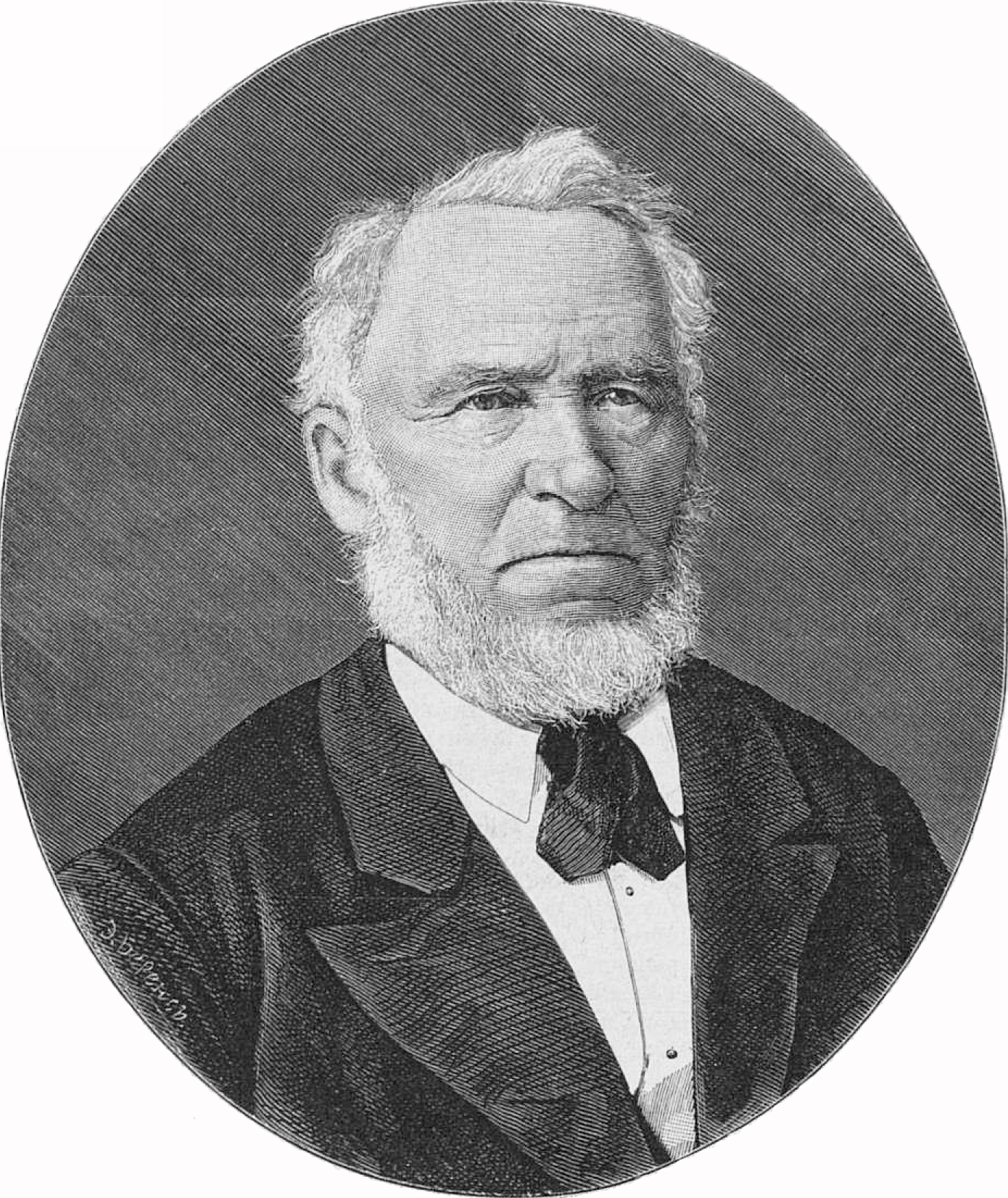
- Regel as the Director of the Imperial Botanical Garden of St. Petersburg
- Born: 13 August 1815; Gotha, Saxe-Coburg and Gotha
- Died: 15 April 1892 (aged 76); St. Petersburg, Russia
- Occupations: Botanist, Director of the Russian Imperial Botanical Garden of St. Petersburg.
- Scientific career
- Author abbrev. (botany): Regel

Eduard August von Regel (also spelled Edward von Regel, Edward de Regel or Édouard von Regel; Russian: Эдуард Август Фон Регель; 13 August 1815 – 15 April 1892) was a German horticulturalist and botanist. He ended his career serving as the Director of the Russian Imperial Botanical Garden of St. Petersburg. As a result of naturalists and explorers sending back biological collections, Regel was able to describe and name many previously unknown species from frontiers around the world.

== History ==
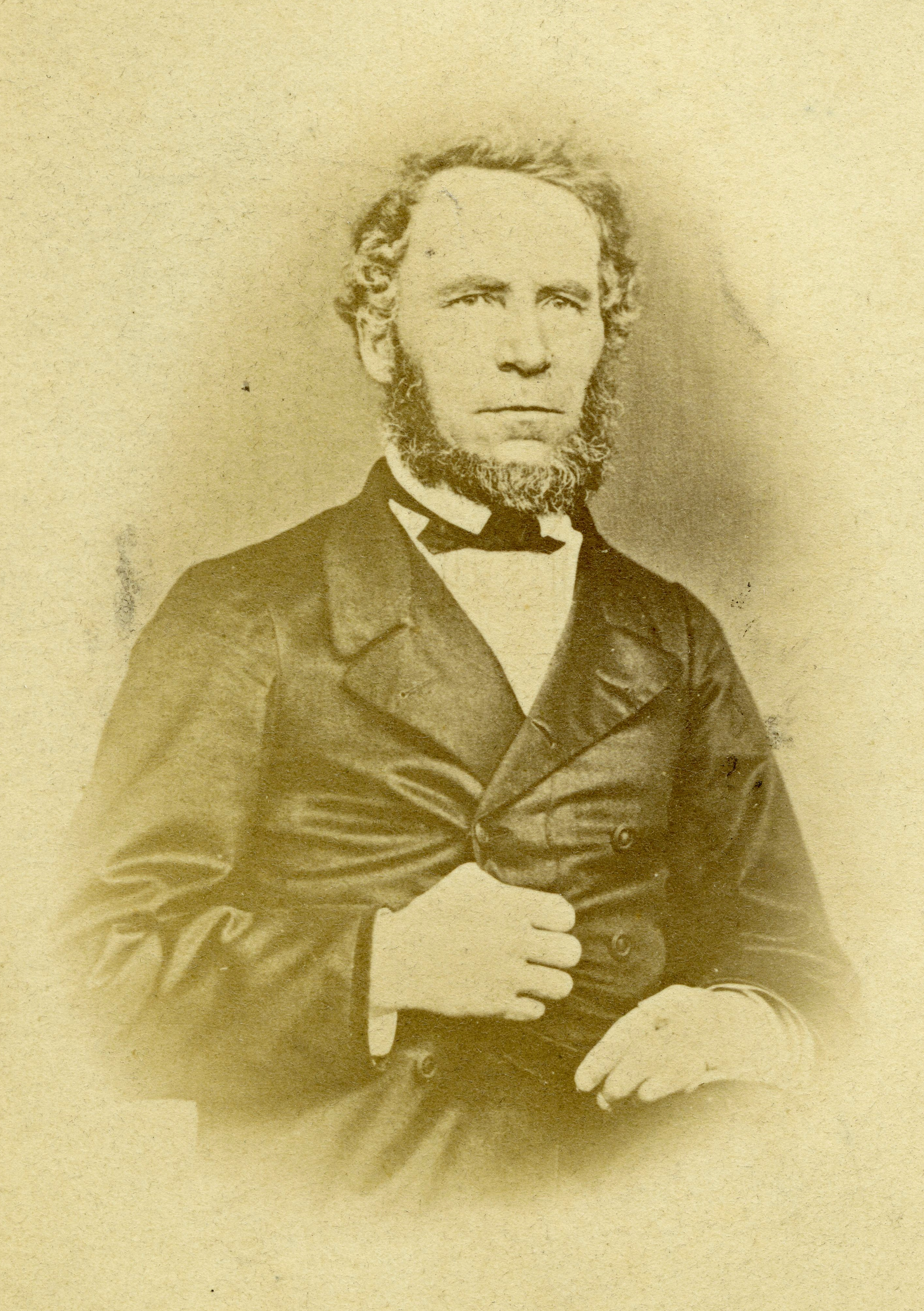

Regel was the son of the teacher and garrison-preacher Ludwig A. Regel. Already as a child he liked growing fruits and learnt to prune apple trees from a gardener of his grandfather Döring and cultivated the garden of his parents. He visited the Gymnasium at Gotha but left without Abitur. Regel earned a degree from the University of Bonn.

At 15, Regel began his career as an apprentice at the Royal Garden Limonaia in Gotha in 1830-1833 and in spring 1833 went as an adjunct to the botanical garden in Göttingen. He then worked in the botanical gardens in Bonn (1837-1839) and Berlin (1839-1842). In 1842 he moved to Switzerland to become the head of the Old Botanical Garden, Zürich. During this time he also worked as a lecturer of science. In 1852 he founded the magazine Gartenflora (Garden Flora), in which he described many new species.

In 1855 Regel moved to St. Petersburg, Russia, where he initially worked as a research director and later as senior botanist at the Imperial Botanical Garden. From 1875 until his death he served as the director of the Imperial Botanical Garden. While there, he oversaw the creation of some of the gardens (e.g. the Admiralty garden) and the facility laboratory. He was a founder and vice-president of the Russian Gardening Society and a number of academic journals. In 1875, he became an associate member of the St. Petersburg Academy of Sciences. Volume 111 of Curtis's Botanical Magazine is dedicated to him.

Regel died in St. Petersburg in 1892 and was buried at the Smolenskoe Lutheran Cemetery.

== Plants named by him ==
Regel described and named over 3000 plant species. Many of the plants he named were from the Russian Far East and Asia as Russian Geographical Society expeditions where active in this area during his tenure at the Imperial Botanical Gardens in St. Petersburg. The standard author abbreviation Regel is used to indicate this person as the author when citing a botanical name.

== Plants named for him ==
In 1843, J. C. Schauer named the genus Regelia in honor of Regel. It is a group of flowering plants in the family Myrtaceae which are endemic to the southwest Australia. In 1854, Planchon named the cestrum species Cestrum regelii after him, Robert Lynch in 1904 a subsection of Iris and Iljinia regelii (Bunge) Korovin ex Iljin is also named in his honour.

== Publications ==
Regel was an extremely prolific scientist and author. In addition to writing a number of major reference works in botany, he published 3101 articles in academic journals.

=== Selected publications ===
- Cultur der Pflanzen unserer höheren Gebirge sowie des hohen Nordens, Erlangen 1856
- Allgemeines Gartenbuch (General garden book) 2 Vols., Zurich 1855, 1868
- Monographia Betulacearum (in: Nouveaux Mémoires de la Société Impériale des Naturalistes de Moscou 13: 59–187, 1861)
- Tentamen florae ussuriensis (Tentamen flora of the Ussuri River Region), 1861
- von Regel, Eduard August (1875). Alliorum adhuc cognitorum monographia. St Petersburgh: Petropolis.
- Tentamen rosarum monographiae (Monograph of Roses), 1877
- Regel, Eduard August von (1868). "Enumeratio plantarum in regionibus cis- et transiliensibus a CL. seminovio anno 1857 collectarum". Bulletin de la Société impériale des naturalistes de Moscou (in Latin). 41 (2): 378–459.
- Regel, Eduard August von (1887). "Descriptiones Plantarum nonnullarum Horti Imperialis Botanici in statu vivo examinatarum". Trudy Imperatorskago S.-Peterburgskago Botanicheskago Sada (Acta Horti Petropolitani) (in Latin). 10 (1): 363–377.

== Associates ==
- Richard Maack Russian botanist, co-author, naturalist, and Siberian explorer.
- Johann Albert von Regel (1845–1908; oldest son) Swiss born Russian Physician, botanist, traveler.
- Constantin Andreas von Regel (1890–1970; grandson) Russian and Lithuanian horticulturalist and botanist.
