= C5H6O2 =

The molecular formula C_{5}H_{6}O_{2} (molar mass: 98.10 g/mol) may refer to:

- Cyclopentanediones
  - 1,2-Cyclopentanedione
  - 1,3-Cyclopentanedione
- Ethyl propiolate
- Furfuryl alcohol
- Glutaconaldehyde
- Tulipalin A
