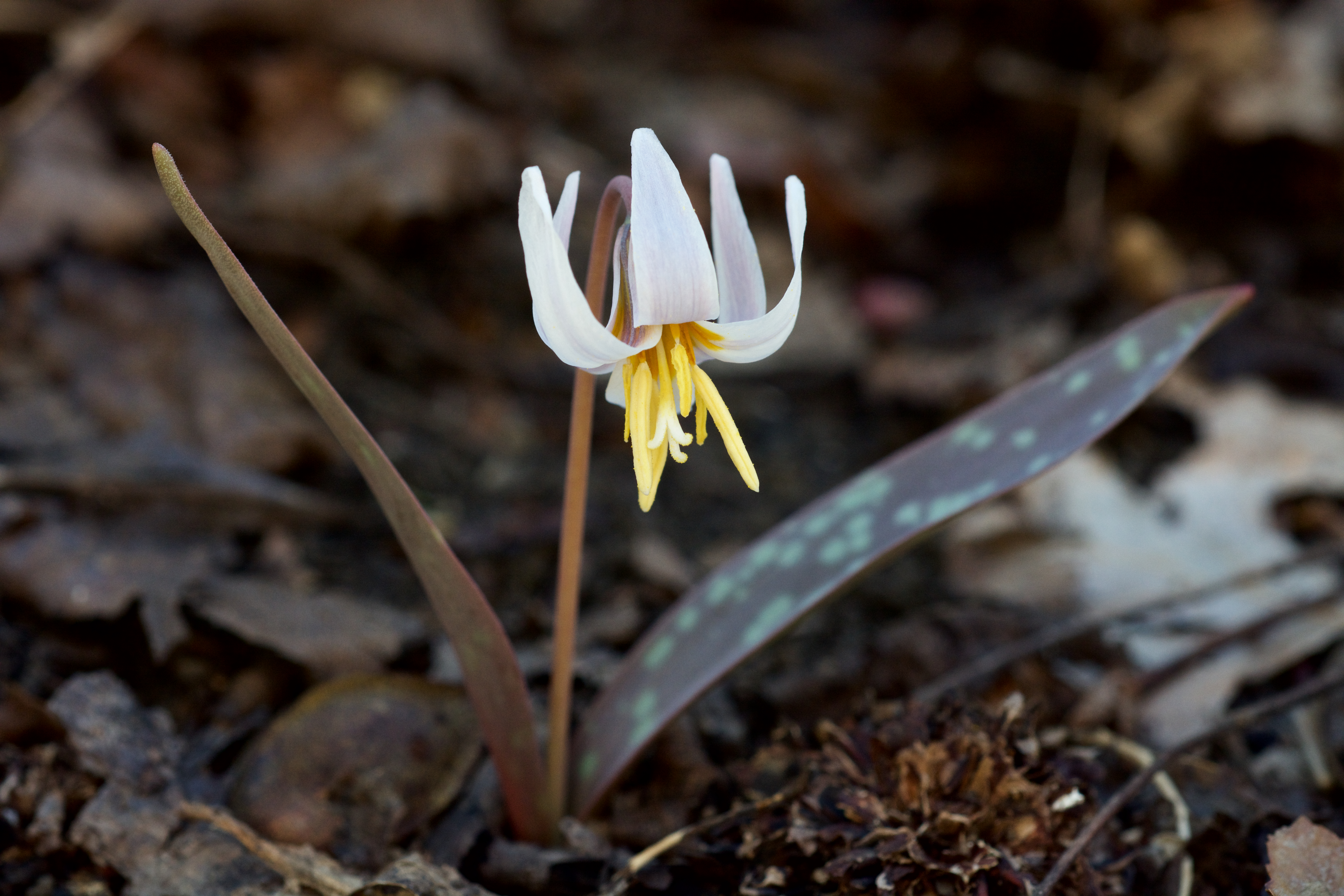

Conservation status
- Secure (NatureServe)

Scientific classification
- Kingdom: Plantae
- Clade: Tracheophytes
- Clade: Angiosperms
- Clade: Monocots
- Order: Liliales
- Family: Liliaceae
- Subfamily: Lilioideae
- Tribe: Lilieae
- Genus: Erythronium
- Species: E. albidum

Binomial name
- Erythronium albidum L.
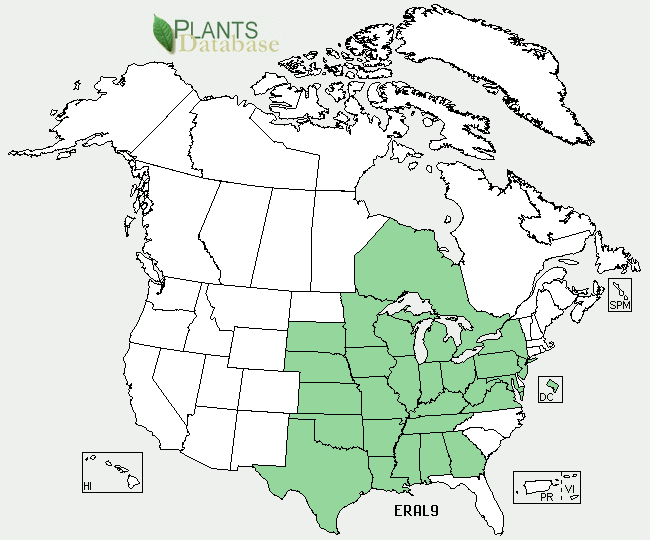

Synonyms
- Erythronium albidum var. coloratum Sterns

= Erythronium albidum =

Species of flowering plant

Erythronium albidum, commonly known as the white fawnlily or white trout lily, is a small herbaceous geophyte in the lily family. It is also known as adder's tongue, white dog's-tooth violet, serpent's tongue, trout lily, deer tongue, creeklily and yellow snowdrop. Large numbers of this plant indicate that the woodland has never been subjected to heavy machinery, where it would be unable to grow due to soil compaction.

== Description ==
=== Morphology ===
The white fawnlily often forms extensive colonies in which immature, non-flowering, 1-leaved plants far outnumber flowering, 2-leaved ones. Flowering 2-leaved plants produce a short, slender, red stem 10–15 cm (4–6 in) tall, which bear two oblong basal leaves. The leaves are lanceolate, 8–16 cm (3 1/4–6 1/4 in) long and 3–4 cm (1 1/4–1 1/2 in) broad, dark green and covered with a mottled pattern of purple blotches. It is difficult to distinguish between Erythronium albidum and Erythronium americanum based solely on leaves. The root system consists of a central corm that sends out stolons which allows plants to slowly spread to form large colonies. The corms of this lily supposedly resemble dog teeth. Foliage of this plant withers away during the summer.

At the end of the stem, the plant produces a white, lily-like flower 3–4 cm (1 1/4–1 1/2 in) in diameter, with six white tepals (3 petals and 3 petal-like sepals) and six yellow stamens. The backs of the tepals are often violet in color near to where the attach to the stem. The flowers are bent downward, and elongate with age. At night the flowers close and don't reopen until morning. Flowers bloom in mid to late spring. The fruiting body is a ovular three chambered capsule and can reach up to 2.5 cm (1 in) in length.

== Distribution and habitat ==
Native to eastern North America, the white fawnlily can be found from southern Quebec and southern Manitoba, and south to Georgia and Texas. The plant is mostly found in large groups on the forest floor, often in areas following ground disturbance. Its preferred growing conditions are in part sun to mostly shade and deep, moist loamy soils.

== Cultivation ==
Erythronium albidum does well in humusy, moist, acidic soils, with full to partial shade and can be grown in zones 3 to 8. Corms can often be obtained from garden centers and nurseries. Plants can also be grown from seed, but will not flower for 4-5 years. Corms should be planted in the fall 2-3” deep and 4-5” apart. Fawnlilies do not transplant well and should be left alone in the wild.

== Folklore and uses ==
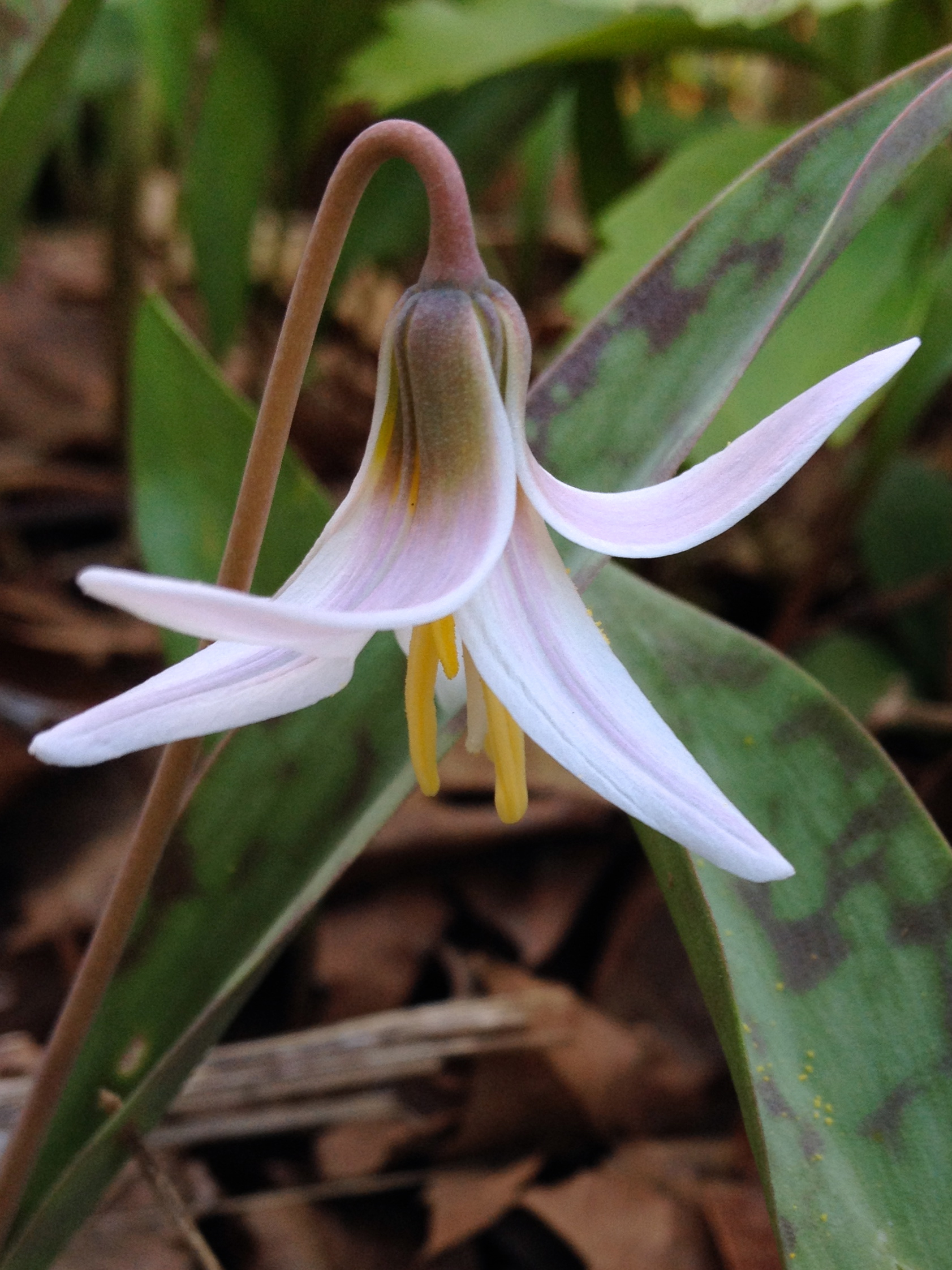
E. albidum flower

European settlers considered it to have similar properties to meadow saffron (Colchicum autumnale), and white fawnlily was often used as a substitute for it. The plant was listed in the Pharmacopoeia of the United States from 1820 to 1863 as a treatment for gout.

Some believe that wounds will be healed if the plant is soaked in cold water, then removed and wrapped it in cloth and applied to a wound or bruise. It is left there until the bundle is warm, and then removed and buried in a muddy place.

Little is known of the constituents, because little research has been done. It is known to contain α-methylene butyrolactone. The plant is emetic, emollient, and antiscorbutic when fresh. It is nutritive when dry.

Certain groups of native Americans used it for its emetic and contraceptive properties. The Onondaga women used the leaves as a temporary birth control method in the spring, to avoid giving birth in the most frigid part of winter.

The leaves can be collected anytime, but the bulb enlarges throughout the summer and can be divided in the fall. At that time of year, the bulb is also edible. The fresh leaves are mostly used in the form of a stimulating poultice, applied to swellings, tumors and scrofulous ulcers.

When made into a tea with horsetail (Equisetum hyemale), it is claimed to be good for bleeding or ulcers of bowels, or for tumors and inflammation of the bowels. It has been used as a quick relief for nose bleeds and sore eyes. The fresh roots or leaves are simmered in milk; or the juice of the plant infused in apple cider; and these treatments are used for dropsy, hiccups, vomiting and bleeding of the bowels. Misuse may cause nausea or even vomiting.
