= Cyclopentanedione =

Cyclopentanedione may refer to:

- 1,2-Cyclopentanedione
- 1,3-Cyclopentanedione

== See also ==
- Pentanedione
