= Pentanedione =

Pentanedione may refer to:

- Acetylacetone (2,4-pentanedione)
- Acetylpropionyl (2,3-pentanedione)

== See also ==
- C_{5}H_{8}O_{2}
- Cyclopentanedione
