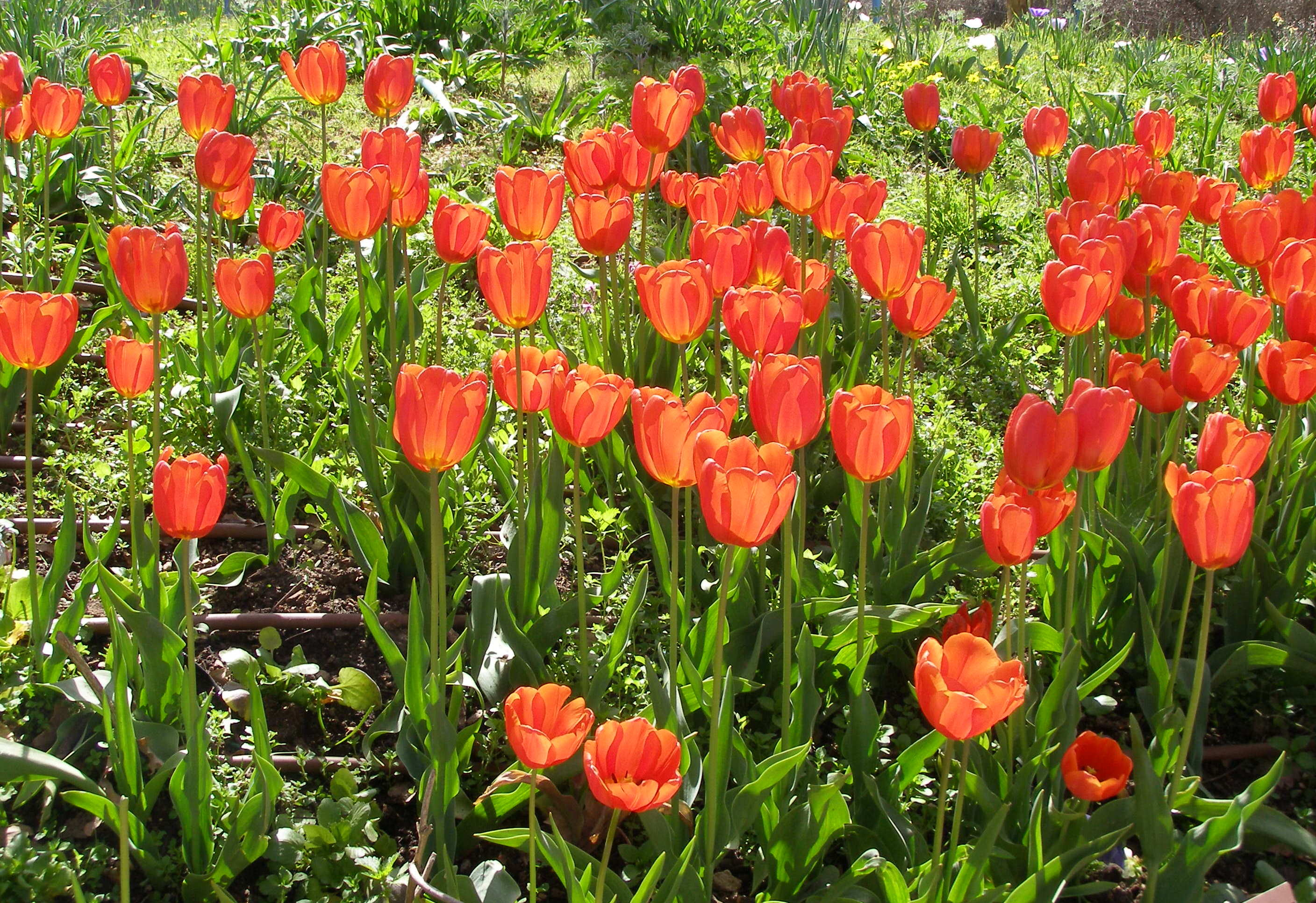
- Tulipa gesneriana

Scientific classification
- Kingdom: Plantae
- Clade: Tracheophytes
- Clade: Angiosperms
- Clade: Monocots
- Order: Liliales
- Family: Liliaceae
- Subfamily: Lilioideae
- Tribe: Lilieae
- Genus: Tulipa; L.

Type species
- Tulipa gesneriana L.

Subgenera
- Clusianae; Orithyia; Tulipa; Eriostemones

Diversity
- About 75 species
- Distribution of Tulipa: Natural (red) and Introduced (yellow)

Synonyms
- Orithyia D.Don; Liriactis Raf.; Liriopogon Raf.; Podonix Raf.; Eduardoregelia Popov

= Tulip =

Genus of plants

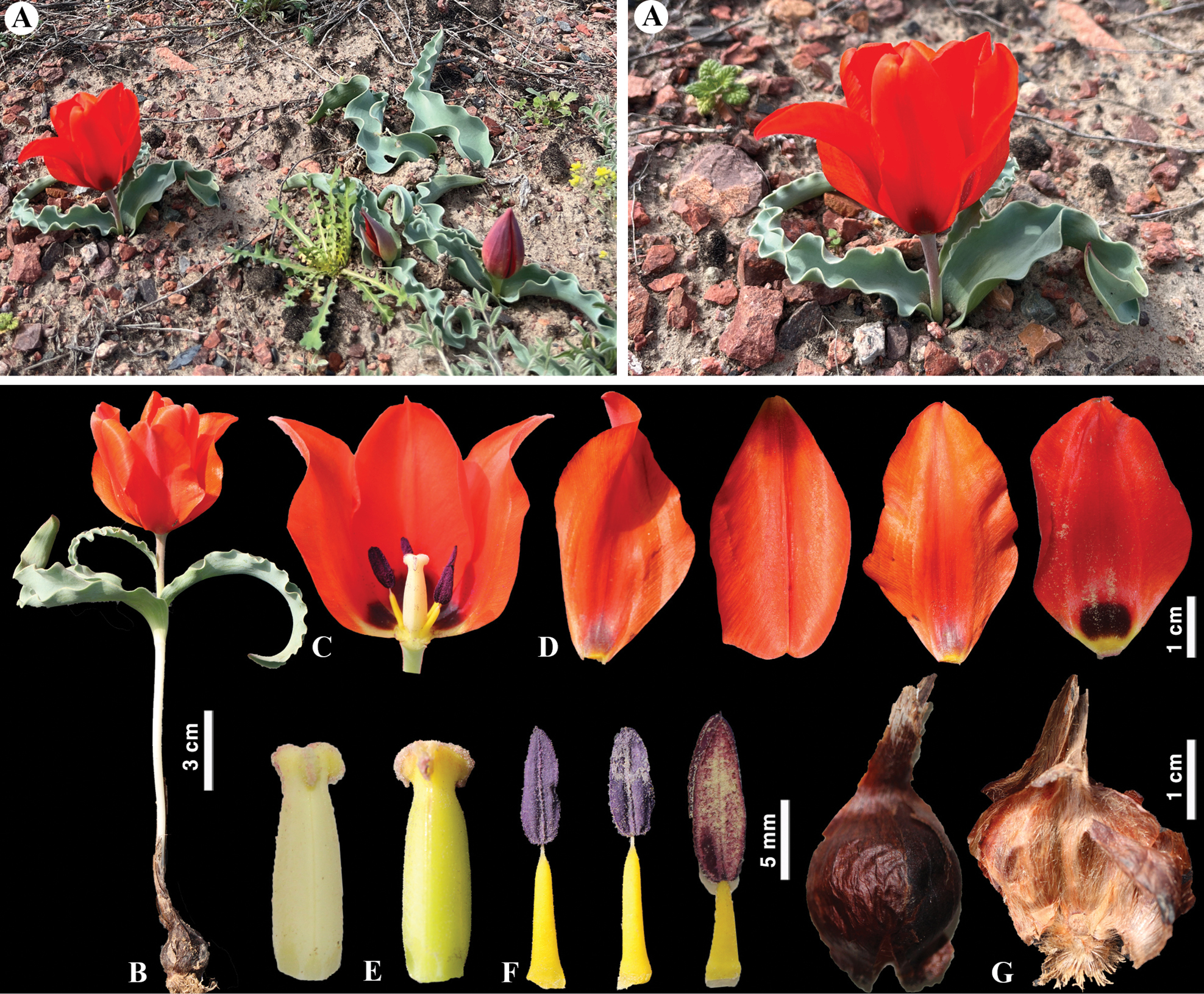
Tulipa alberti in Kazakhstan

Tulips are spring-blooming perennial herbaceous bulbiferous geophytes in the Tulipa genus. Their flowers are usually large, showy, and brightly coloured, generally red, orange, pink, yellow, or white. They often have a different coloured blotch at the base of the tepals, internally. Because of a degree of variability within the populations and a long history of cultivation, classification has been complex and controversial. The tulip is a member of the lily family, Liliaceae, along with 14 other genera, where it is most closely related to Amana, Erythronium, and Gagea in the tribe Lilieae.

There are about 75 species, and these are divided among four subgenera. The name "tulip" is thought to be derived from a Turkish word for turban, which it may have been thought to resemble by those who discovered it. Tulips were originally found in a band stretching from Southern Europe to Central Asia, but since the seventeenth century have become widely naturalised and cultivated (see map). In their natural state, they are adapted to steppes and mountainous areas with temperate climates. Flowering in the spring, they become dormant in the summer once the flowers and leaves die back, emerging above ground as a shoot from the underground bulb in early spring.

Growing wild over much of the Near East and Central Asia, the Persian and Turkish people were the first to cultivate tulips. The cultivation of tulips dates back to 10th-century Persia. Tulips were probably introduced into Anatolia with the advance of the Seljuks. By the 15th century, tulips were among the most prized flowers, becoming the symbol of the later Ottomans. Tulips were cultivated in Byzantine Constantinople as early as 1055 but they did not come to the attention of Northern Europeans until the sixteenth century, when Northern European diplomats to the Ottoman court observed and reported on them. They were rapidly introduced into Northern Europe and became the subject of an investment bubble during the Dutch tulip mania of 1634–1637. Tulips were frequently depicted in Dutch Golden Age paintings, and have become associated with the Netherlands, the major producer for world markets, ever since.

In the seventeenth-century Netherlands, during the time of the tulip mania, an infection of tulip bulbs by the tulip breaking virus created variegated patterns in the tulip flowers that were much admired and valued. While truly broken tulips are not cultivated anymore, the closest available specimens today are part of the group known as the Rembrandts – so named because Rembrandt painted some of the most admired breaks of his time.

Breeding programmes have produced thousands of hybrid and cultivars in addition to the original species (known in horticulture as botanical tulips). They are popular throughout the world, both as ornamental garden plants and as cut flowers.

== Description ==
Tulips are perennial herbaceous bulbiferous geophytes that bloom in spring and die back after flowering to an underground storage bulb. A bulb can be as much as 5 cm (2 inches) in diameter or as small as 1 cm (0.4 in).

Tulip stems have few leaves. Larger species tend to have multiple leaves. Plants typically have two to six leaves, some species up to 12. The tulip's leaf is cauline (born on a stem), strap-shaped, with a waxy coating, and the leaves are alternate (alternately arranged on the stem), diminishing in size the further up the stem. These fleshy blades are often bluish-green in colour. The bulbs are truncated basally and elongated towards the apex. They are covered by a protective tunic (tunicate) which can be glabrous or hairy inside. Depending on the species, tulip leaves are typically 10 and 25 cm (4 and 10 inches) long, but in some species reach over 30 cm (12 in).

=== Flowers ===
Tulip morphology

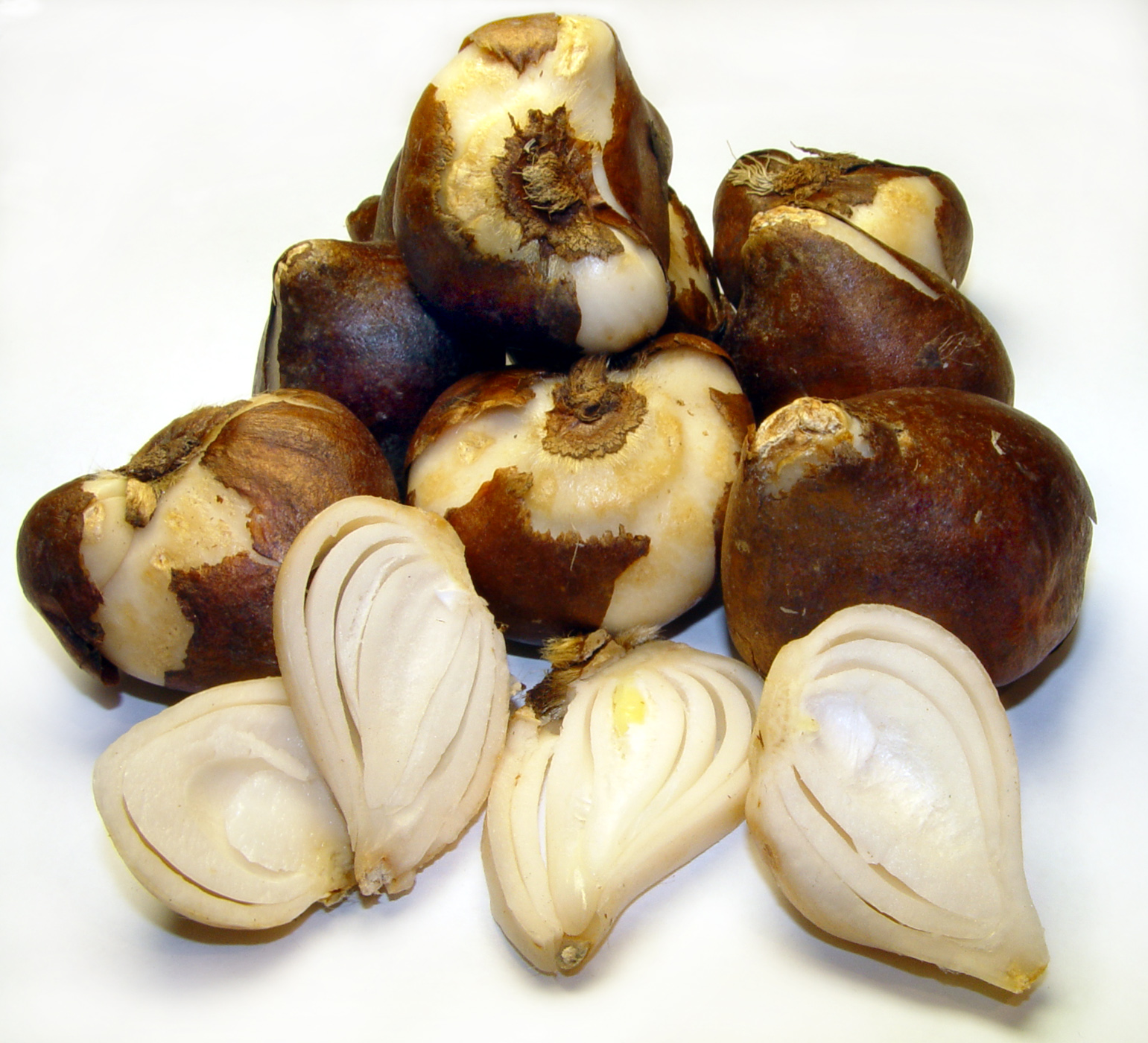
Bulbs, showing tunic and scales

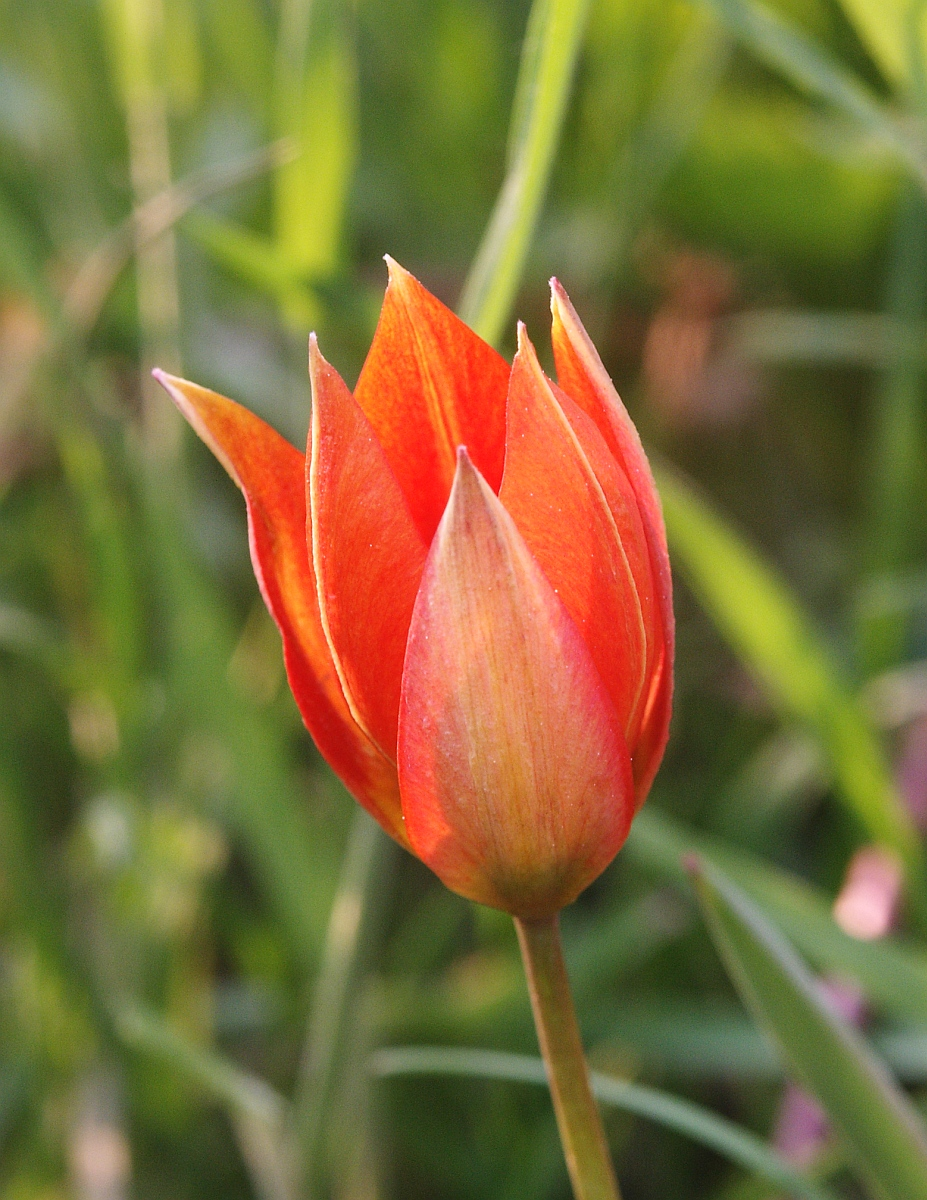
Cup-shaped flower of Tulipa orphanidea

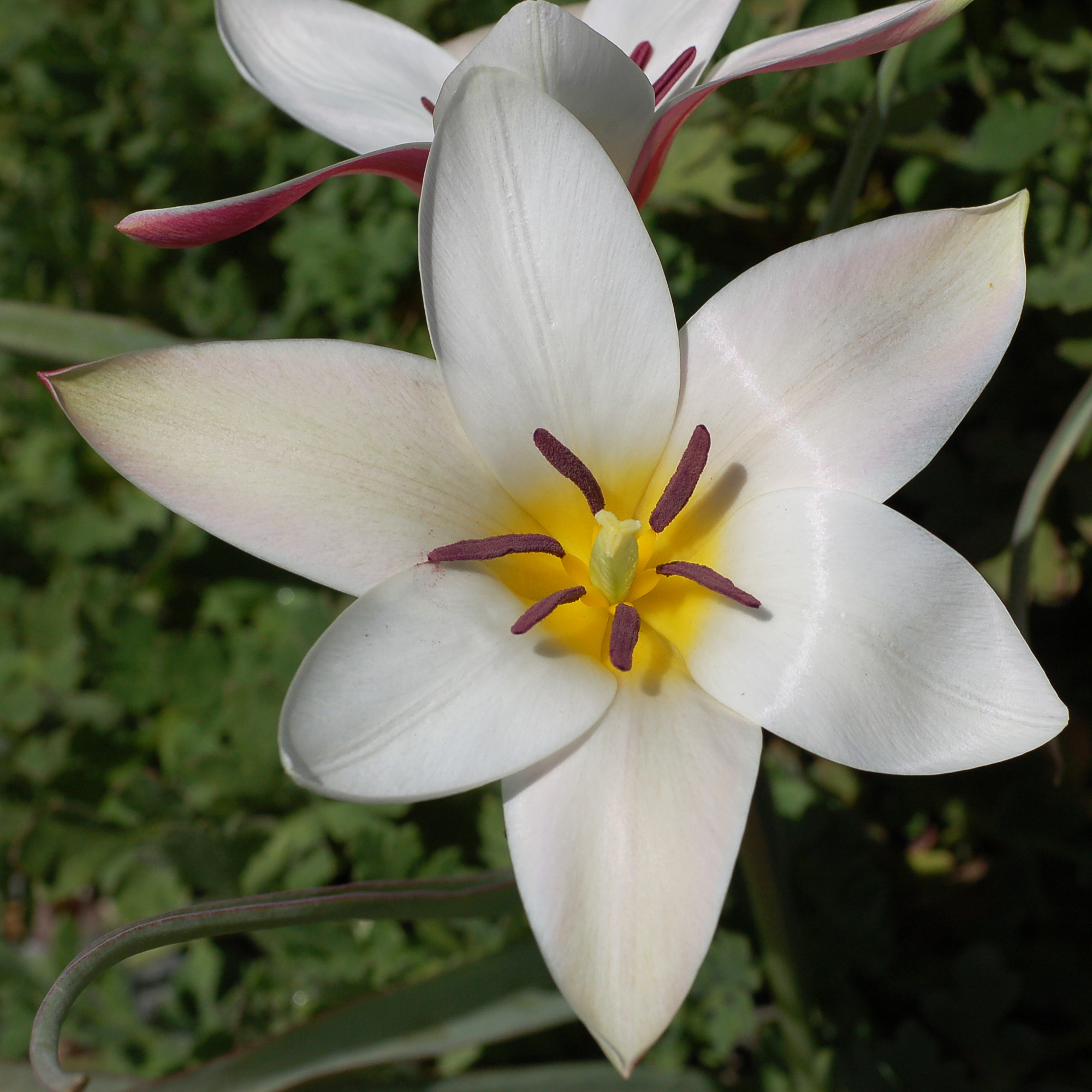
Star-shaped flower of Tulipa clusiana with three sepals and three petals, forming six identical tepals

The tulip's flowers are usually large and are actinomorphic (radially symmetric) and hermaphrodite (contain both male (androecium) and female (gynoecium) characteristics), generally erect, or more rarely pendulous, and are arranged more usually as a single terminal flower, or when pluriflor as two to three (e.g. Tulipa turkestanica), but up to four, flowers on the end of a floriferous stem (scape), which is single arising from amongst the basal leaf rosette.

In structure, the flower is generally cup or star-shaped. As with other members of Liliaceae the perianth is undifferentiated (perigonium) and biseriate (two whorled), formed from six free (i.e. apotepalous) caducous tepals arranged into two separate whorls of three parts (trimerous) each. The two whorls represent three petals and three sepals but are termed tepals because they are nearly identical. The tepals are usually petaloid (petal-like), being brightly coloured, but each whorl may be different, or have different coloured blotches at their bases, forming darker colouration on the interior surface. The inner petals have a small, delicate cleft at the top, while the sturdier outer ones form uninterrupted ovals.

The flowers have six distinct, basifixed introrse stamens arranged in two whorls of three, which vary in length and may be glabrous or hairy. The filaments are shorter than the tepals and dilated towards their base. The style is short or absent and each stigma has three distinct lobes, and the ovaries are superior, with three chambers.

==== Colours ====
Tulip flowers come in a wide variety of colours — reds, yellows, purples, white — except pure blue (several tulips with "blue" in the name have a faint violet hue), and do not have nectaries. The colour of a tulip is formed from two pigments working in concert; a base colour that is always yellow or white, and a second anthocyanin colour. The mix of these two hues determines the visible unitary colour. The breaking of flowers occurs when a virus suppresses anthocyanin production and the base colour is exposed as a streak.

While tulips can be bred for many of colours, black tulips have historically been difficult to achieve. The Queen of the Night tulip is close to black, though it is a dark and glossy maroonish purple. The first truly black tulip was bred in 1986 by a Dutch flower grower in Bovenkarspel, Netherlands. It was created by cross-breeding two deep purple tulips, the Queen of the Night and Wienerwald tulips.

=== Fruit ===
The tulip's fruit is a globose or ellipsoid capsule with a leathery covering and an ellipsoid to globe shape. Each capsule contains numerous flat, disc-shaped seeds in two rows per chamber. These light to dark brown seeds have very thin seed coats and endosperm that do not normally fill the entire seed.

=== Phytochemistry ===
Tulipanin is an anthocyanin found in tulips. It is the 3-rutinoside of delphinidin. Tuliposides and tulipalins can also be found in tulips and are responsible for allergies. Tulipalin A, or α-methylene-γ-butyrolactone, is a common allergen, generated by hydrolysis of the glucoside tuliposide A. It induces a dermatitis that is mostly occupational and affects tulip bulb sorters and florists who cut the stems and leaves. Tulipanin A and B are toxic to horses, cats and dogs.

=== Fragrance ===
The great majority of tulips, both species and cultivars, have no discernable scent, but a few of both are scented to a degree, and Anna Pavord describes T. hungarica as "strongly scented", and among cultivars, some such as "Monte Carlo" and "Brown Sugar" are "scented", and "Creme Upstar" "fragrant".

== Taxonomy ==
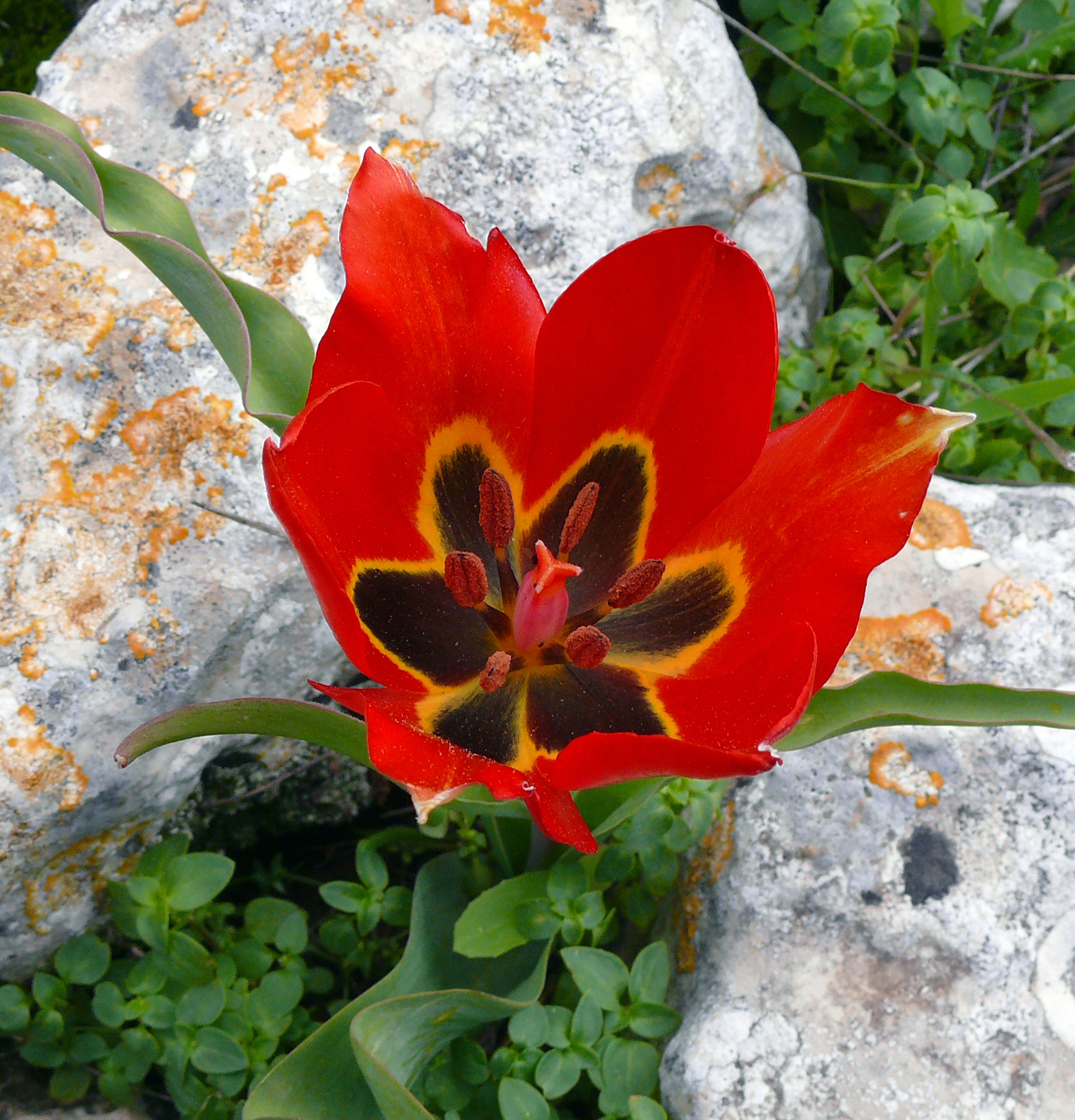
Levantine mountain tulip Tulipa agenensis

It was published by Carl Linnaeus in 1753 with Tulipa gesneriana L. as the type species. Tulipa is a genus of the lily family, Liliaceae, once one of the largest families of monocots, but which molecular phylogenetics has reduced to a monophyletic grouping with only 15 genera. Within Liliaceae, Tulipa is placed within Lilioideae, one of three subfamilies, with two tribes. Tribe Lilieae includes seven other genera in addition to Tulipa.

=== Subdivision ===
The genus, which includes about 75 species, is divided into four subgenera.

- Clusianae (4 species)
- Orithyia (4 species)
- Tulipa (52 species)
- Eriostemones (16 species)

=== Etymology ===
The word tulip, first mentioned in western Europe in or around 1554 and seemingly derived from the "Turkish Letters" of diplomat Ogier Ghiselin de Busbecq, first appeared in English as tulipa or tulipant, entering the language by way of French: tulipe and its obsolete form tulipan or by way of Modern Latin tulipa, from Ottoman Turkish tülbend ("muslin" or "gauze"), and may be ultimately derived from the Persian: دُلبند dulband ("Turban"), this name being applied because of a perceived resemblance of the shape of a tulip flower to that of a turban. This may have been due to a translation error in early times when it was fashionable in the Ottoman Empire to wear tulips on turbans. The translator possibly confused the flower for the turban.

== Distribution and habitat ==
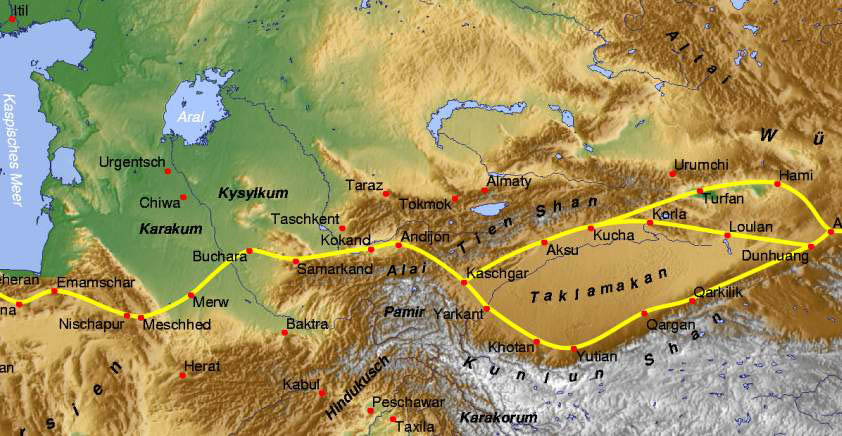
Eastern end of the tulip range from Turkmenistan on the eastern shore of the Caspian Sea to the Pamir-Alai and Tien-Shan mountains

Tulips are mainly distributed along a band corresponding to latitude 40° north, from southeast of Europe (Greece, Albania, North Macedonia, Kosovo, Southern Serbia, Bulgaria, most part of Romania, Ukraine, Russia) and Turkey in the west, through the Levant (Syria, Israel, Palestinian Territories, Lebanon and Jordan) and the Sinai Peninsula. From there it extends eastwards through Jerevan (Armenia), and Baku (Azerbaijan) and on the eastern shore of the Caspian Sea through Turkmenistan, Bukhara, Samarkand and Tashkent (Uzbekistan), to the eastern end of the range in the Pamir-Alai and Tien-Shan mountains in Central Asia, which form the centre of diversity. Further to the east, Tulipa is found in the western Himalayas, southern Siberia, Inner Mongolia, and as far as the northwest of China.

While authorities have stated that no tulips west of the Balkans are native, subsequent identification of Tulipa sylvestris subsp. australis as a native of the Iberian Peninsula and adjacent North Africa shows that this may be a simplification. In addition to these regions in the west tulips have been identified in Greece, Cyprus and the Balkans. In the south, Iran marks its furthest extent, while the northern limit is Ukraine. Although tulips are also found throughout most of the Mediterranean and Europe, these regions do not form part of the natural distribution. Tulips were brought to Europe by travellers and merchants from Anatolia and Central Asia for cultivation, from where they escaped and naturalised (see map). For instance, less than half of those species found in Turkey are actually native. These have been referred to as neo-tulipae.

Tulips are indigenous to mountainous areas with temperate climates, where they are a common element of steppe and winter-rain Mediterranean vegetation. They thrive in climates with long, cool springs and dry summers. Tulips are most commonly found in meadows, steppes and chaparral, but also introduced in fields, orchards, roadsides and abandoned gardens.

== Ecology ==
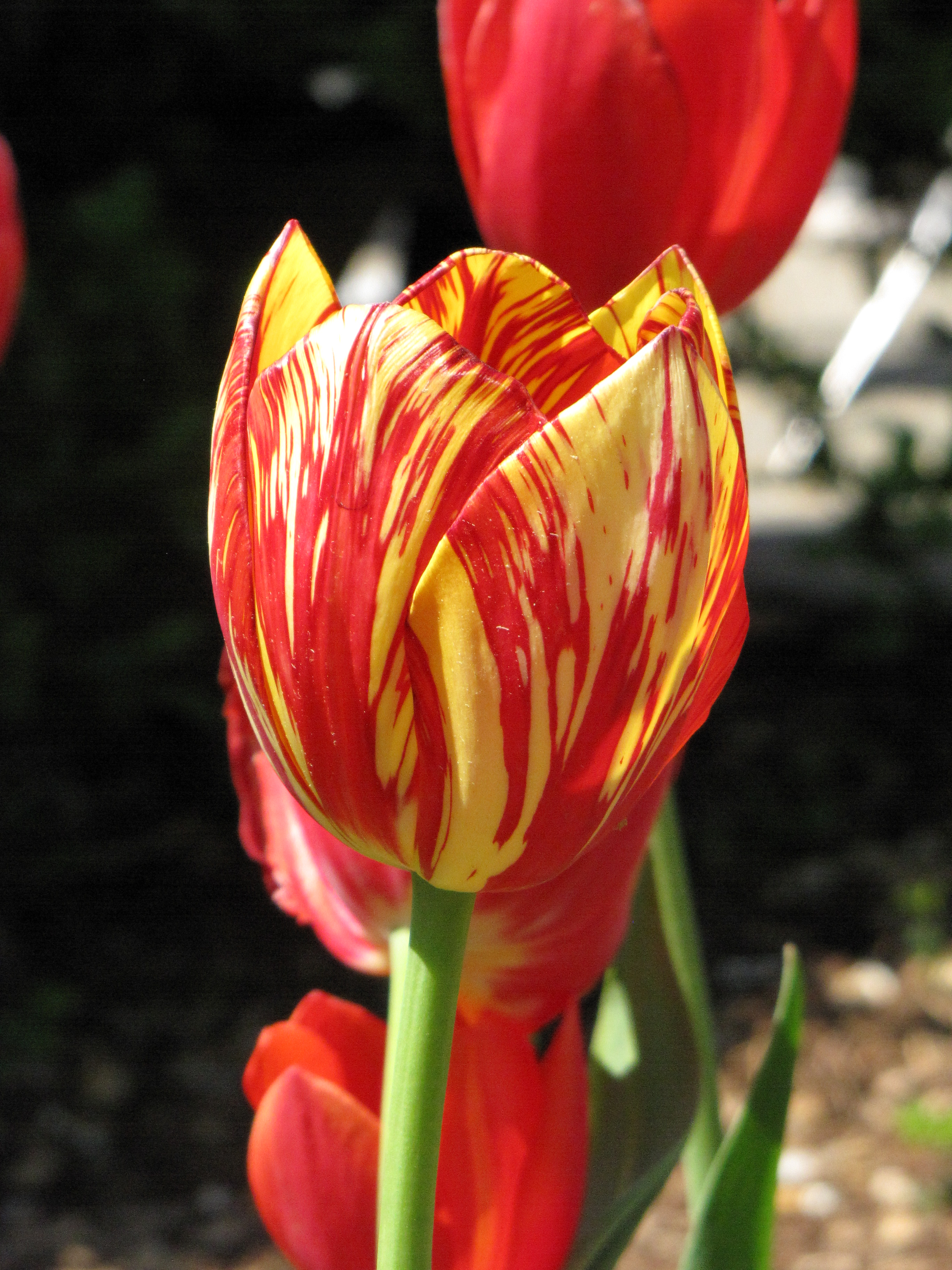
Variegation produced by the tulip breaking virus

Botrytis tulipae is a major fungal disease affecting tulips, causing cell death and eventually the rotting of the plant. Other pathogens include anthracnose, bacterial soft rot, blight caused by Sclerotium rolfsii, bulb nematodes, other rots including blue moulds, black moulds and mushy rot.

The fungus Trichoderma viride can infect tulips, producing dried leaf tips and reduced growth, although symptoms are usually mild and only present on bulbs growing in glasshouses.

Variegated tulips admired during the Dutch tulipomania gained their delicately feathered patterns from an infection with the tulip breaking virus, a mosaic virus that was carried by the green peach aphid, Myzus persicae. While the virus produces fantastically streaked flowers, it also weakens plants and reduces the number of offsets produced. Dutch growers would go to extraordinary lengths during tulipomania to make tulips break, borrowing alchemists' techniques and resorting to sprinkling paint powders of the desired hue or pigeon droppings onto flower roots. Tulips affected by the mosaic virus are called "broken"; while such plants can occasionally revert to a plain or solid colouring, they will remain infected and have to be destroyed. Today the virus is almost eradicated from tulip growers' fields. The multicoloured patterns of modern varieties result from breeding; they normally have solid, un-feathered borders between the colours.

Tulip growth is also dependent on temperature conditions. Slightly germinated plants show greater growth if subjected to a period of cool dormancy, known as vernalisation. Furthermore, although flower development is induced at warmer temperatures (20–25 °C or 68–77 °F), elongation of the flower stalk and proper flowering is dependent on an extended period of low temperature (< 10 °C or 50 °F). Tulip bulbs imported to warm-winter areas are often planted in autumn to be treated as annuals. The colour of tulip flowers also varies with growing conditions.

== History of cultivation ==
=== Islamic world ===
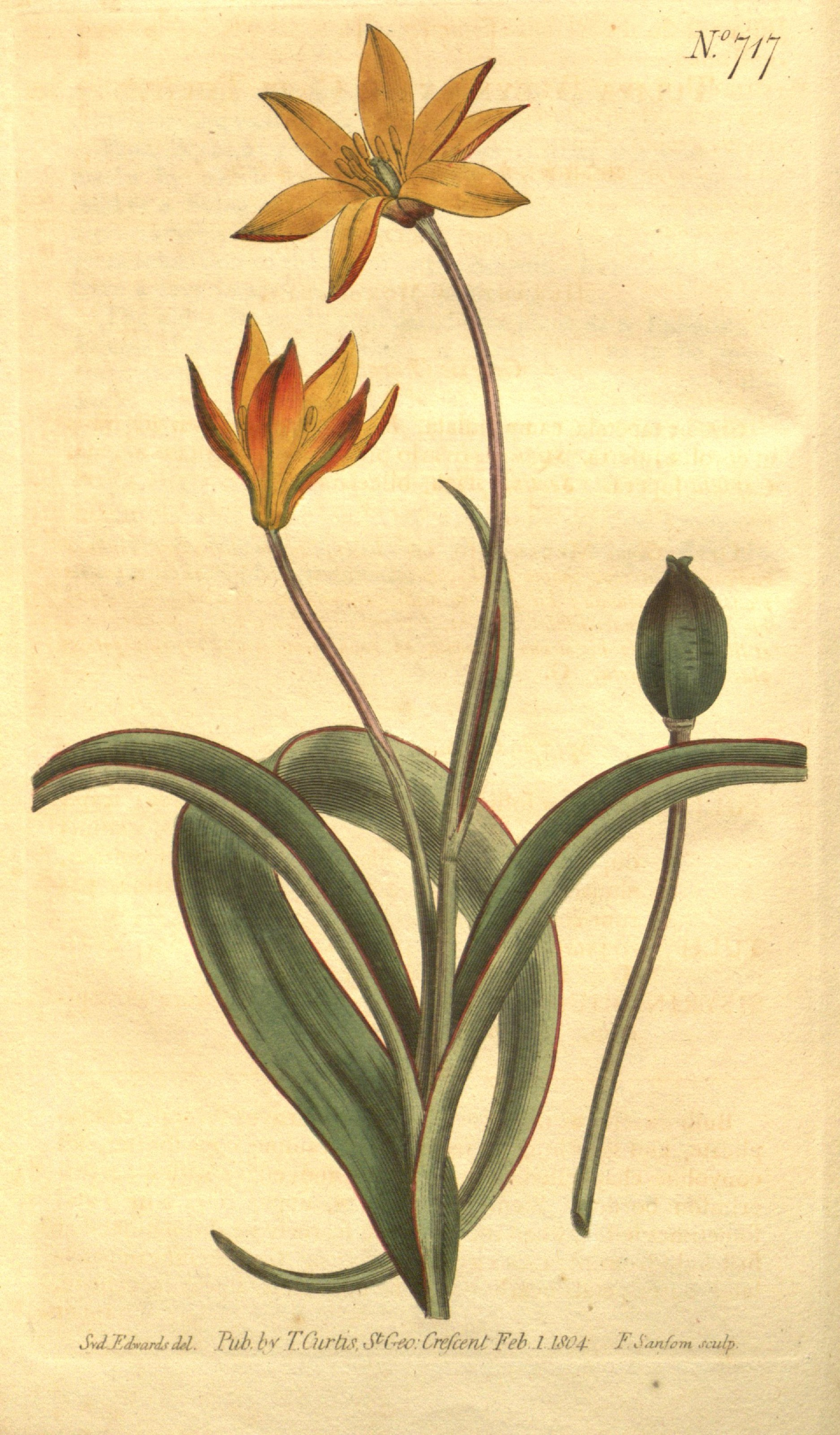
Tulipa sylvestris subsp. australis (Note: Illustration of Tulipa sylvestris subsp. australis, identified as Tulipa breyniana) with seedpod by Sydenham Edwards (1804)

The Turkish and Persian people were the first to cultivate tulips. While the cultivation of tulips in Iranian gardens dates back to the 10th century, the westward expansion of diverse tulip varieties into Asia Minor occurred most significantly under the Seljuk dynasty. The Persian poet Omar Khayyam's 11th-century poetry frequently featured the tulip as a symbol of ideal feminine beauty. Early cultivars must have emerged from hybridisation in gardens from wild collected plants, which were then favoured, possibly due to flower size or growth vigour. The tulip is not mentioned by any writer from antiquity, therefore it seems probable that tulips were introduced into Anatolia only with the advance of the Seljuks. In the Ottoman Empire, numerous types of tulips were cultivated and bred, and today, 14 species can still be found in Turkey. Tulips are mentioned by the 13th century Persian sufi mystic Jalāl ad-Dīn Rûmi. Species of tulips in Turkey typically come in red, less commonly in white or yellow. The Ottoman Turks had discovered that these wild tulips were great changelings, freely hybridising (though it takes 7 years to show colour) but also subject to mutations that produced spontaneous changes in form and colour.

A paper by Arthur Baker reports that in 1574, Sultan Selim II ordered the Kadi of A'azāz in Syria to send him 50,000 tulip bulbs. However, John Harvey points out several problems with this source, and there is also the possibility that tulips and hyacinth (sümbüll), originally Indian spikenard (Nardostachys jatamansi) have been confused. Sultan Selim also imported 300,000 bulbs of Kefe Lale (also known as Cafe-Lale, from the medieval name Kaffa, probably Tulipa suaveolens, syn. Tulipa schrenkii) from Kefe in Crimea, for his gardens in the Topkapı Sarayı in Istanbul.

It is also reported that shortly after arriving in Constantinople in 1554, Ogier Ghislain de Busbecq, ambassador of the Austrian Habsburgs to the court of Suleyman the Magnificent, claimed to have introduced the tulip to Europe by sending a consignment of bulbs west. The fact that the tulip's first official trip west took it from one court to the other could have contributed to its ascendency.

Sultan Ahmet III maintained famous tulip gardens in the summer highland pastures (yayla) at Spil Dağı above the town of Manisa. They seem to have consisted of wild tulips. However, of the 14 tulip species known from Turkey, only four are considered to be of local origin, so wild tulips from Iran and Central Asia may have been brought into Turkey during the Seljuk and especially Ottoman periods. Also, Sultan Ahmet imported domestic tulip bulbs from the Netherlands.

The gardening book Revnak'ı Bostan (Beauty of the Garden) by Sahibül Reis ülhaç Ibrahim Ibn ülhaç Mehmet, written in 1660 does not mention the tulip at all, but contains advice on growing hyacinths and lilies. However, there is considerable confusion of terminology, and tulips may have been subsumed under hyacinth, a mistake several European botanists were to perpetuate. In 1515, the scholar Qasim from Herat in contrast had identified both wild and garden tulips (lale) as anemones (shaqayq al-nu'man) but described the crown imperial as laleh kakli.

In a Turkic text written before 1495, the Chagatay Husayn Bayqarah mentions tulips (lale). Babur, the founder of the Mughal Empire, also names tulips in the Baburnama. He may actually have introduced them from Afghanistan to the plains of India, as he did with other plants like melons and grapes. The tulip represents the official symbol of Turkey. In Moorish Andalus, a "Makedonian bulb" (basal al-maqdunis) or "bucket-Narcissus" (naryis qadusi) was cultivated as an ornamental plant in gardens. It was supposed to have come from Alexandria and may have been Tulipa sylvestris, but the identification is not wholly secure.

=== Introduction to Western Europe ===
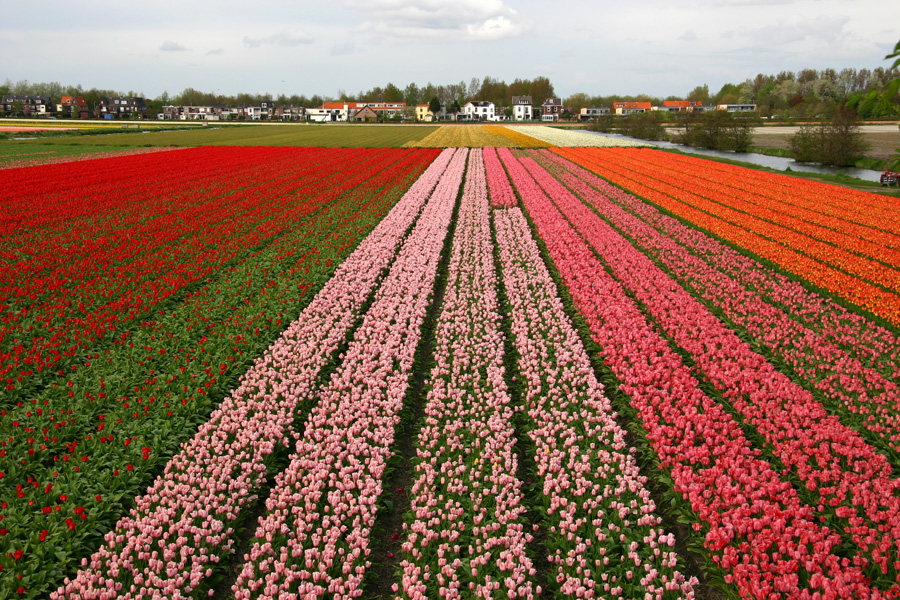
Tulip cultivation in the Netherlands

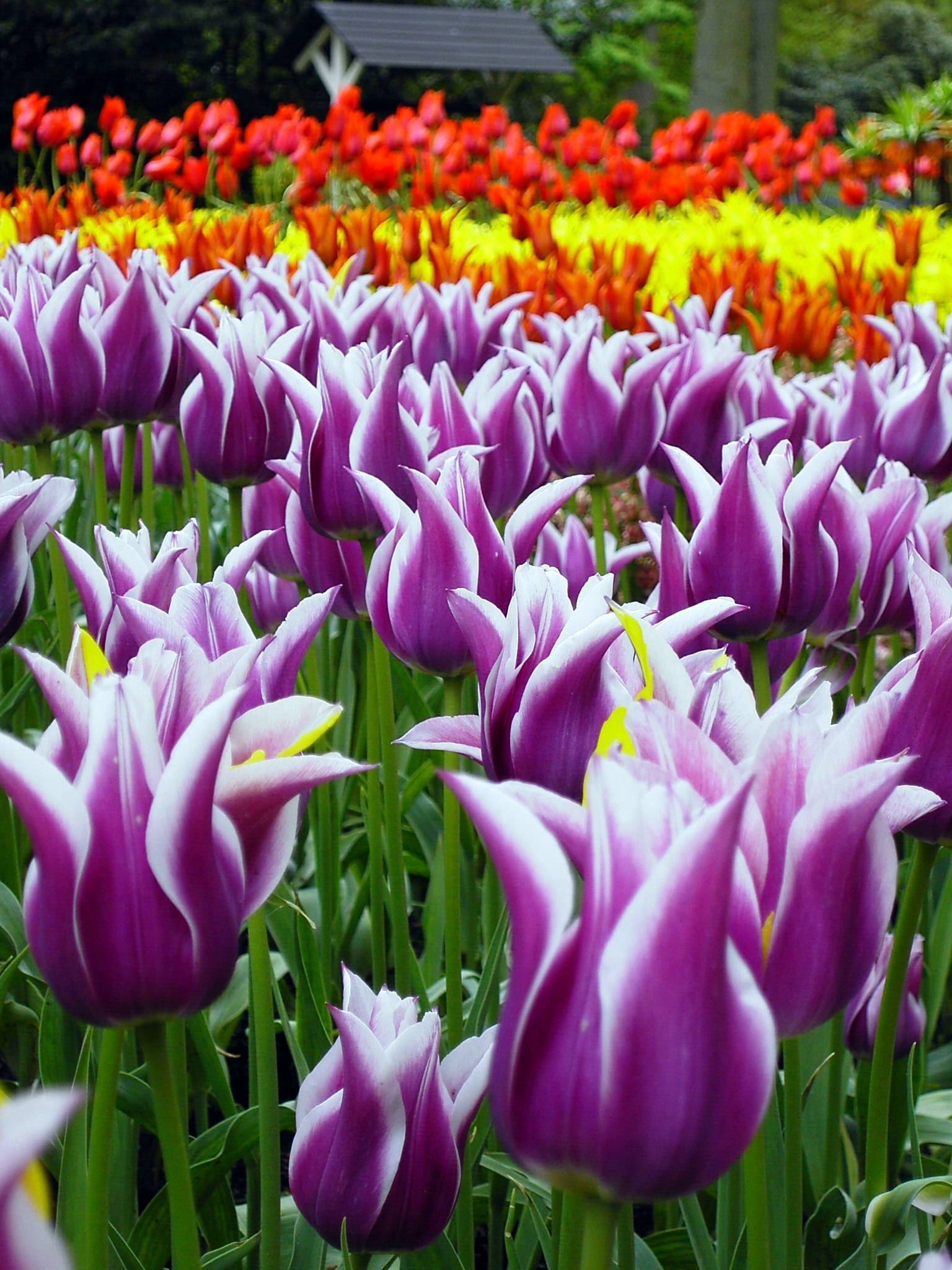
The Keukenhof in Lisse, Netherlands

Although it is unknown who first brought the tulip to Northwestern Europe, the most widely accepted story is that it was Oghier Ghislain de Busbecq, an ambassador for Emperor Ferdinand I to Suleyman the Magnificent. According to a letter, he saw "an abundance of flowers everywhere; narcissus, hyacinths and those in Turkish called Lale, much to our astonishment because it was almost midwinter, a season unfriendly to flowers." However, in 1559, an account by Conrad Gessner describes tulips flowering in Augsburg, Swabia, in the garden of Councillor Heinrich Herwart. In Central and Northern Europe, tulip bulbs are generally removed from the ground in June and must be replanted by September for the winter. It is doubtful that Busbecq could have had the tulip bulbs harvested, shipped to Germany and replanted between March 1558 and Gessner's description the following year. Pietro Andrea Mattioli illustrated a tulip in 1565 but identified it as a narcissus.

==== Tulip mania in the Netherlands ====
Carolus Clusius is largely responsible for the spread of tulip bulbs in the final years of the 16th century; he planted tulips at the Vienna Imperial Botanical Gardens in 1573. He finished the first major work on tulips in 1592 and made note of the colour variations. After he was appointed the director of the Leiden University's newly established Hortus Botanicus, he planted both a teaching garden and his private garden with tulips in late 1593. Thus, 1594 is considered the date of the tulip's first flowering in the Netherlands, despite reports of the cultivation of tulips in private gardens in Antwerp and Amsterdam two or three decades earlier. The Tulip Garden in Netherlands is world famous. These tulips at Leiden would eventually lead to both the tulip mania and the tulip industry in the Netherlands. Over two raids, in 1596 and in 1598, more than one hundred bulbs were stolen from his garden.

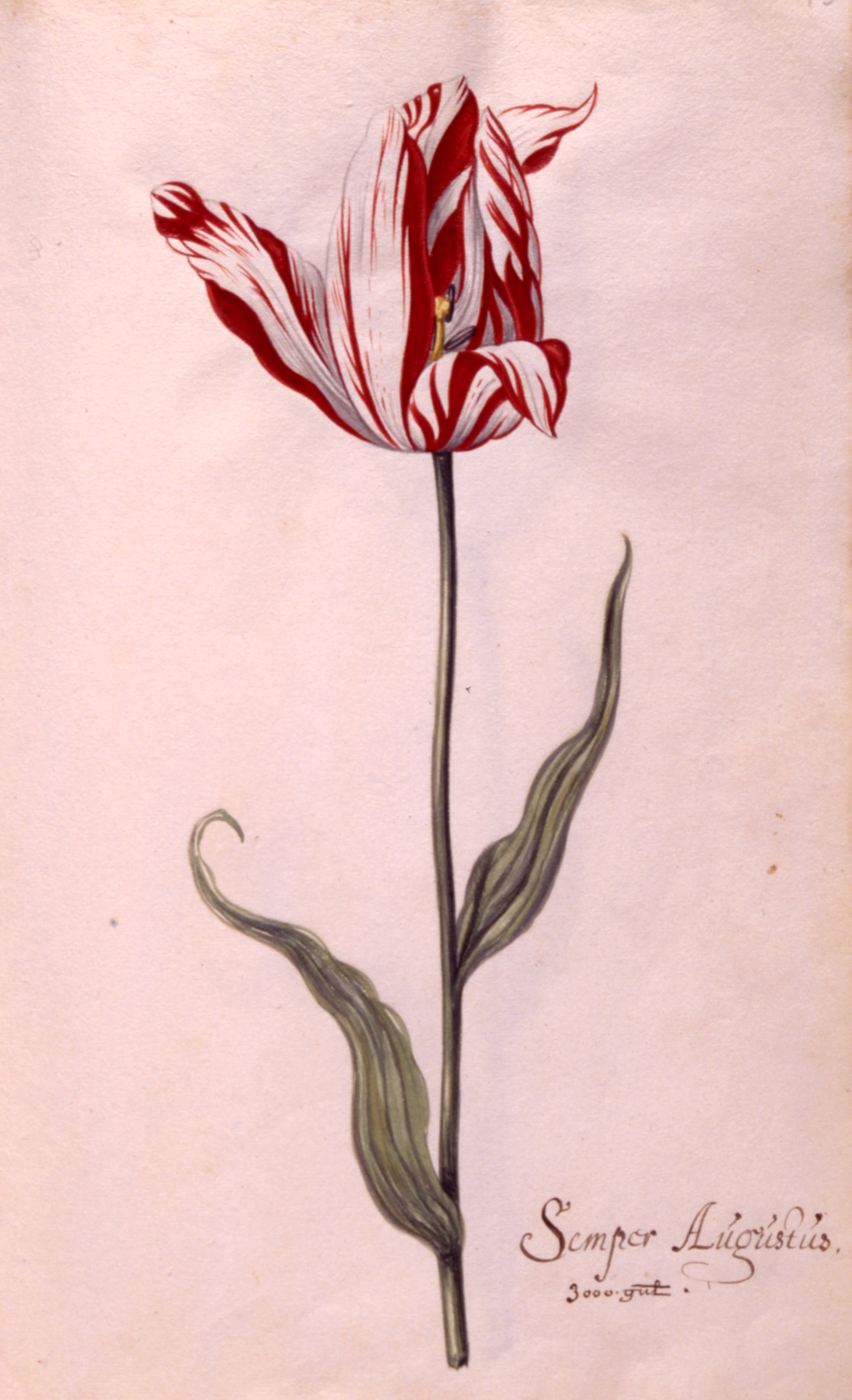
Semper Augustus (17th century) in the Tulip book of the Six Collection, Rijksmuseum, Amsterdam. The note states that the specimen was sold for ƒ3000 (~€38.000 in 2024).

Between 1634 and 1637, the enthusiasm for the new flowers in the Netherlands triggered a speculative frenzy now known as the tulip mania, the first recorded speculative bubble in history, that eventually led to the collapse of the market three years later. Tulip bulbs had become so expensive that they were treated as a form of currency, or rather, as futures, forcing the Dutch government to introduce trading restrictions on the bulbs. The 'Semper Augustus' was the most expensive tulip during the 17th-century tulip mania. At the height of 'Tulip mania' this tulip was even sold for 10.000 guilders (equivalent to approx. €130.000 in 2024). After seeing the tulip in the garden of Dr. Adriaan Pauw, a director of the Dutch East India Company, Nicolas van Wassenaer wrote in 1624 that "The colour is white, with carmine on a blue base, and with an unbroken flame right to the top". The 'Semper Augustus' was actually not a tulip variety, but rather a tulip affected by the tulip mosaic virus. With limited specimens in existence at the time and most owned by Pauw, his refusal to sell any flowers, despite wildly escalating offers, is believed by some to have sparked the mania. Around this time, the ceramic tulipiere was devised for the display of cut flowers stem by stem. Vases and bouquets, usually including tulips, often appeared in Dutch still-life painting.

To this day, tulips are associated with the Netherlands, and the cultivated forms of the tulip are often called "Dutch tulips". The Netherlands has the world's largest permanent display of tulips at the Keukenhof. The majority of tulip cultivars are classified in the taxon Tulipa gesneriana. They have usually several species in their direct background, but most have been derived from Tulipa suaveolens. Tulipa gesneriana is in itself an early hybrid of complex origin and is probably not the same taxon as was described by Conrad Gessner in the 16th century. The UK's National Collection of English florists' tulips and Dutch historic tulips, dating from the early 17th century to c. 1960, is held by Polly Nicholson at Blackland House, near Calne in Wiltshire.

==== Propagation ====
Tulips spread rapidly across Europe, and more opulent varieties such as double tulips were already known in Europe by the early 17th century. These curiosities fitted well in an age when natural oddities were cherished especially in the Low Lands, France, Germany and England, where the spice trade with the East Indies had made many people wealthy. Nouveaux riches seeking wealthy displays embraced the exotic plant market, especially in the Low Countries where gardens had become fashionable. A craze for bulbs soon grew in France, where in the early 17th century, entire properties were exchanged as payment for a single tulip bulb. The value of the flower gave it an aura of mystique, and numerous publications describing varieties in lavish garden manuals were published, cashing in on the value of the flower. An export business was built up in France, supplying buyers in the Low Lands, Germany and England. The trade drifted slowly from the French to the Dutch.

=== Introduction to the Americas ===
==== United States ====
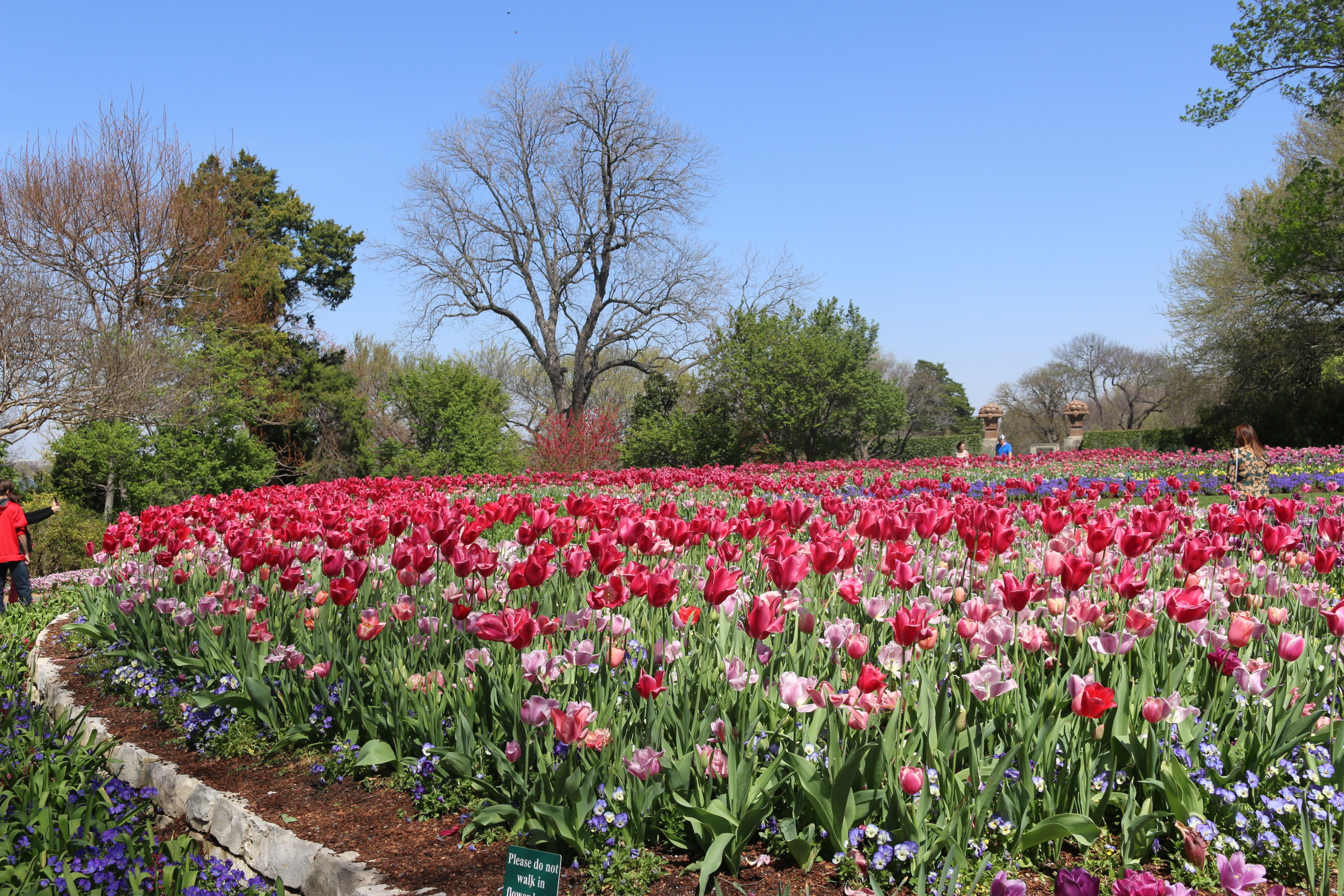
The Dallas Arboretum and Botanical Garden

It is believed the first tulips in the United States were grown near Spring Pond at the Fay Estate in Lynn and Salem, Massachusetts. From 1847 to 1865, Richard Sullivan Fay, Esq., one of Lynn's wealthiest men, settled on 2 km^{2} (200 ha; 500 acres) located partly in present-day Lynn and partly in present-day Salem. Mr. Fay imported many different trees and plants from all parts of the world and planted them among the meadows of the Fay Estate.

==== Canada ====
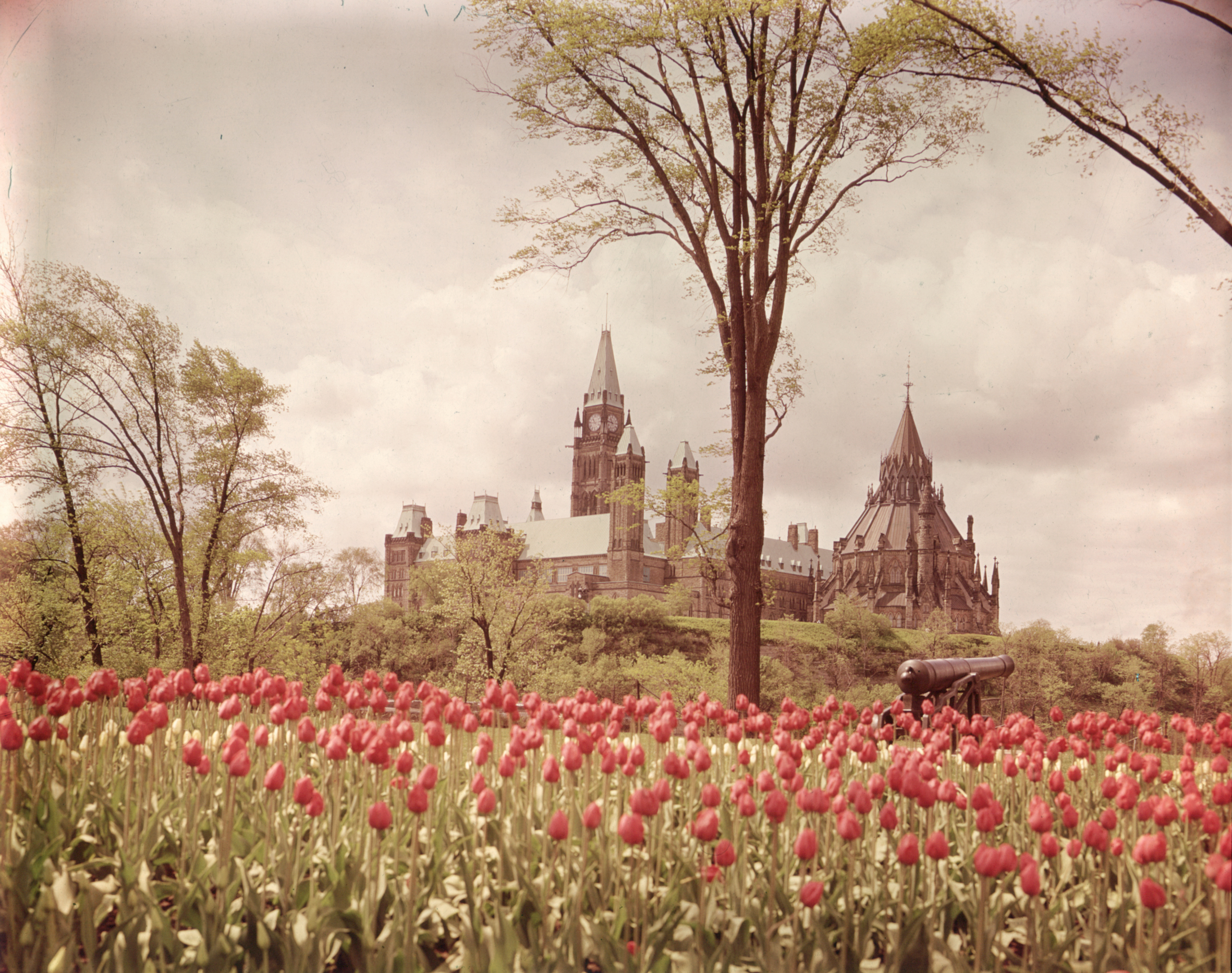
Red tulips blooming for the Ottawa Tulip Festival in 1952

During World War II, Seymour Cobley of the Brittish Royal Horticultural Society donated 83,000 tulips to Canada from 1941 to 1943 to honour Canadian involvement in the war.

The Canadian Tulip Festival (French: Festival Canadien des Tulipes; Dutch: Canadees Festival van de Tulp) is a tulip festival held annually each May in Ottawa, Ontario, Canada. The festival claims to be the world's largest tulip festival, displaying over one million tulips, with attendance of over 650,000 visitors annually. The festival is a cultural and historical aspect of the special Canada–Netherlands relationship, having originated with commemorative donations of tulips to Canada from the Netherlands for Canadian actions during World War II, when Canadian forces led the liberation of the Netherlands and hosted the Dutch royal family in exile.

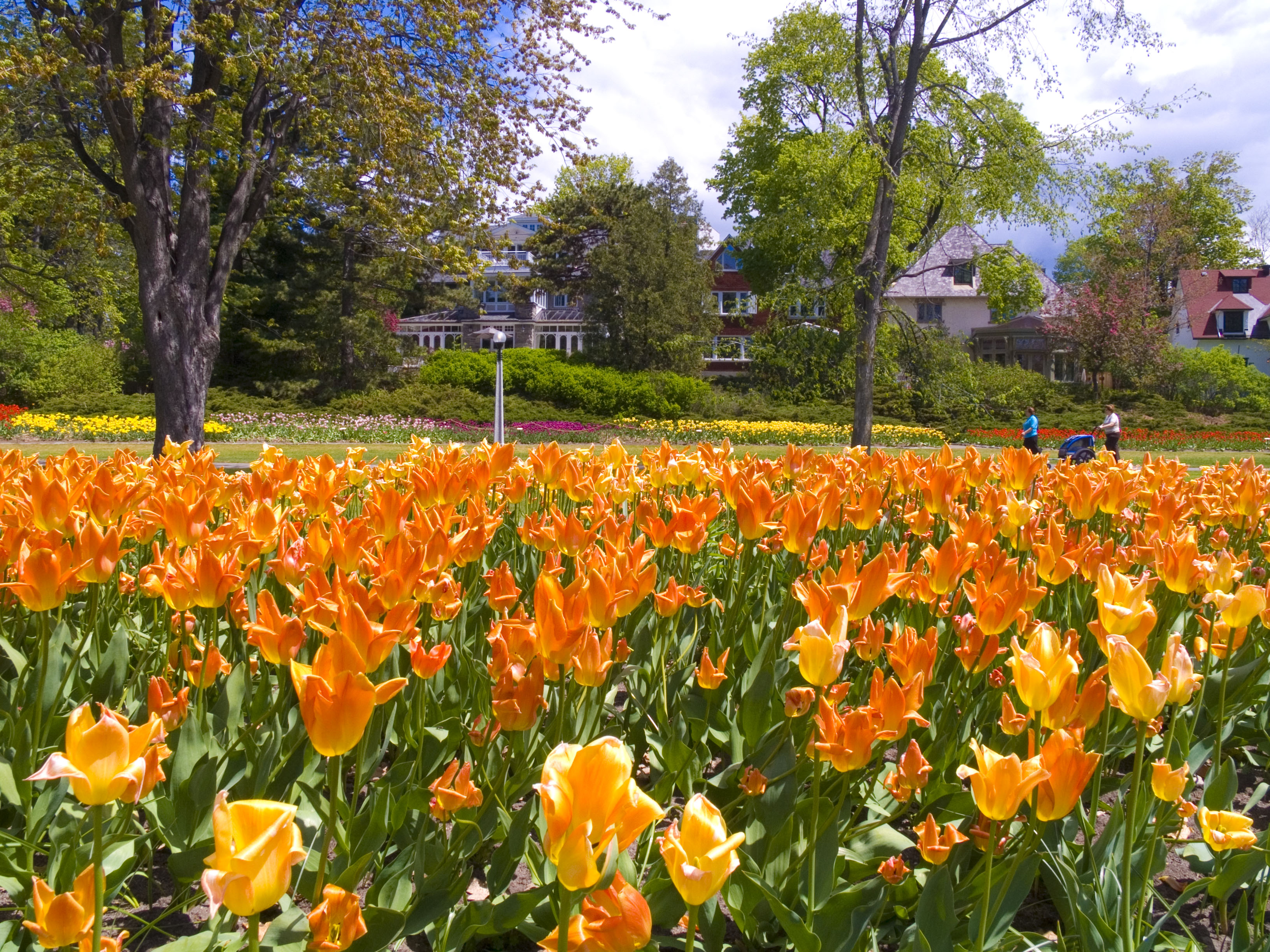
Crown-shaped orange Liberation75-tulips, to commemorate the 75th Anniversary of the Liberation of the Netherlands. As part of the Liberation75 commemoration event, 1.1 million orange crown-shaped Liberation75 tulips (formerly known as the Orange Emperor variety), in addition to deep red Canadian Liberator tulips, were sent from growers in the Netherlands and planted across Canada to honour the 1.1 million Canadians, who served during World War II.

In 1945 the Dutch royal family sent 100,000 tulip bulbs to Ottawa in gratitude for Canadians having sheltered the future Queen Juliana and her family for the preceding three years during the Nazi occupation of the Netherlands. In 1946 Juliana sent another 20,500 bulbs requesting that a display be created for the hospital, and promised to send 10,000 more bulbs each year. By 1963 the Canadian Tulip Festival featured more than 2 million tulips, rising to nearly 3 million by 1995. The Netherlands continues to send 20,000 bulbs to Canada each year (10,000 from the royal family and 10,000 from the Dutch Bulb Growers Association).

== Horticulture ==
=== Trade and cultivation ===
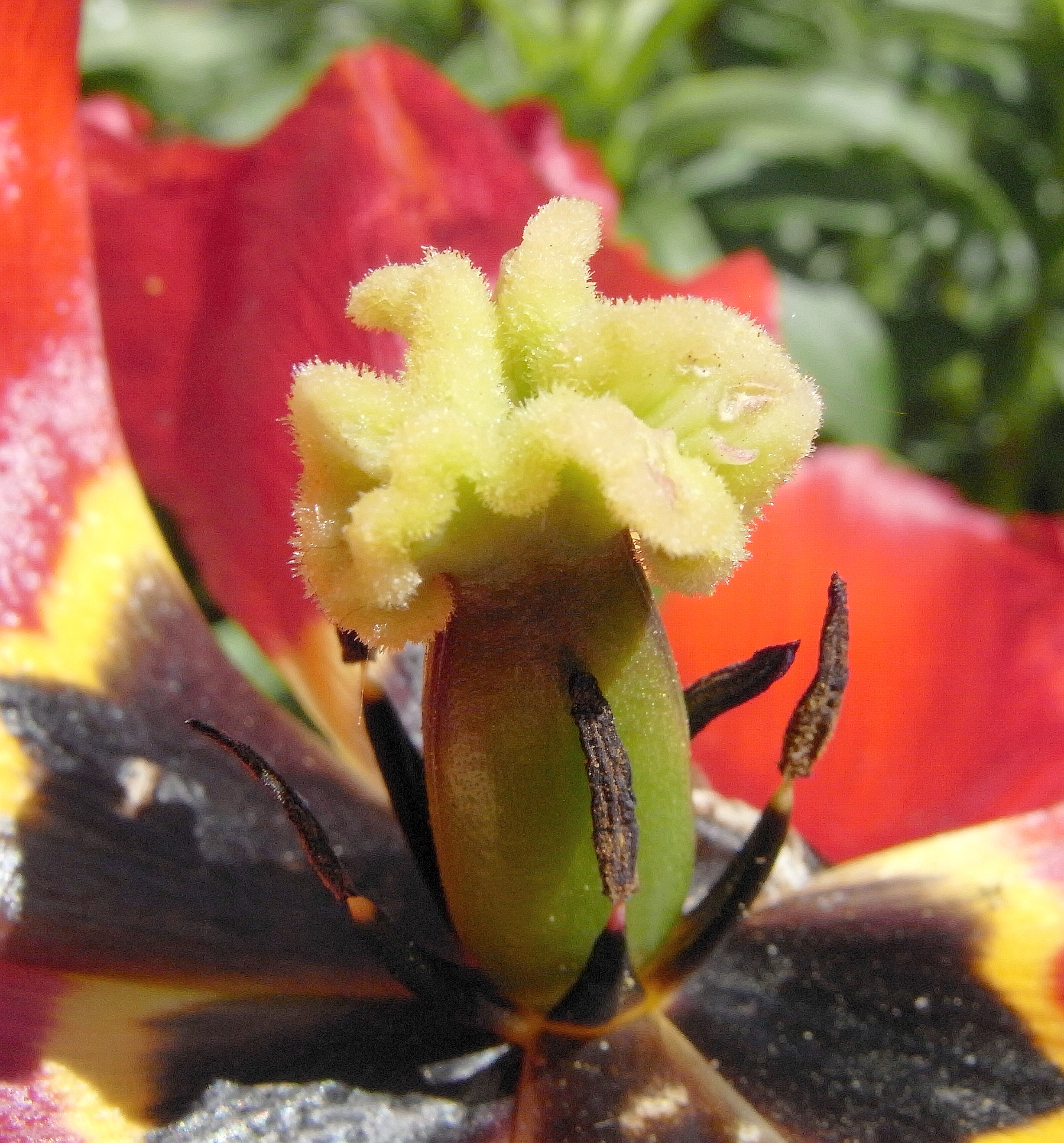
Tulip pistil surrounded by stamens

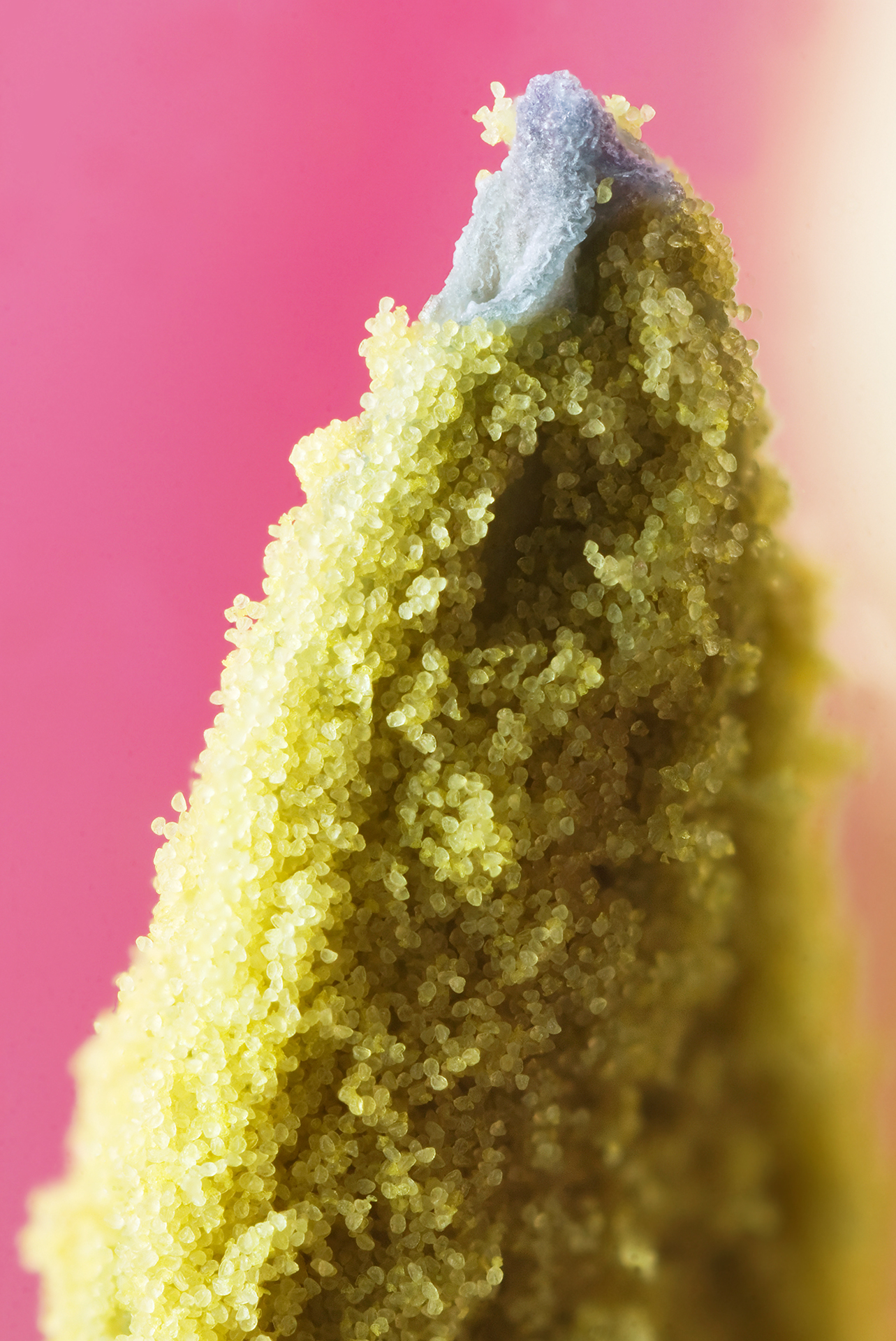
Tulip stamen with pollen grains

The reproductive organs of a tulip

The Netherlands is the world's main producer of commercial tulip plants, producing as many as 3 billion bulbs annually, the majority for export.

"Unlike many flower species, tulips do not produce nectar to entice insect pollination. Instead, tulips rely on wind and land animals to move their pollen between reproductive organs. Because they are self-pollinating, they do not need the pollen to move several feet to another plant but only within their blossoms."

Tulips can be propagated through bulb offsets, seeds or micropropagation. Offsets and tissue culture methods are means of asexual propagation for producing genetic clones of the parent plant, which maintains cultivar genetic integrity. Seeds are most often used to propagate species and subspecies or to create new hybrids. Many tulip species can cross-pollinate with each other, and when wild tulip populations overlap geographically with other tulip species or subspecies, they often hybridise and create mixed populations. Most commercial tulip cultivars are complex hybrids, and often sterile.

Offsets require a year or more of growth before plants are large enough to flower. Tulips grown from seeds often need five to eight years before plants are of flowering size. To prevent cross-pollination, increase the growth rate of bulbs and increase the vigour and size of offsets, the flower and stems of a field of commercial tulips are usually topped using large tractor-mounted mowing heads. The same goals can be achieved by a private gardener by clipping the stem and flower of an individual specimen. Commercial growers usually harvest the tulip bulbs in late summer and grade them into sizes; bulbs large enough to flower are sorted and sold, while smaller bulbs are sorted into sizes and replanted for sale in the future.

Because tulip bulbs do not reliably come back every year, tulip varieties that fall out of favour with present aesthetic values have traditionally gone extinct. Unlike other flowers that do not suffer this same limitation, the tulip's historical forms do not survive alongside their modern incarnations.

Tulip bulbs are typically planted around late summer and fall, in well-drained soils. Tulips should be planted 10 to 15 cm (4 to 6 inches) apart from each other. The recommended hole depth is 10 to 20 cm (4 to 8 inches) deep and is measured from the top of the bulb to the surface. Therefore, larger tulip bulbs would require deeper holes. Species of tulips are normally planted deeper.

=== Horticultural classification ===
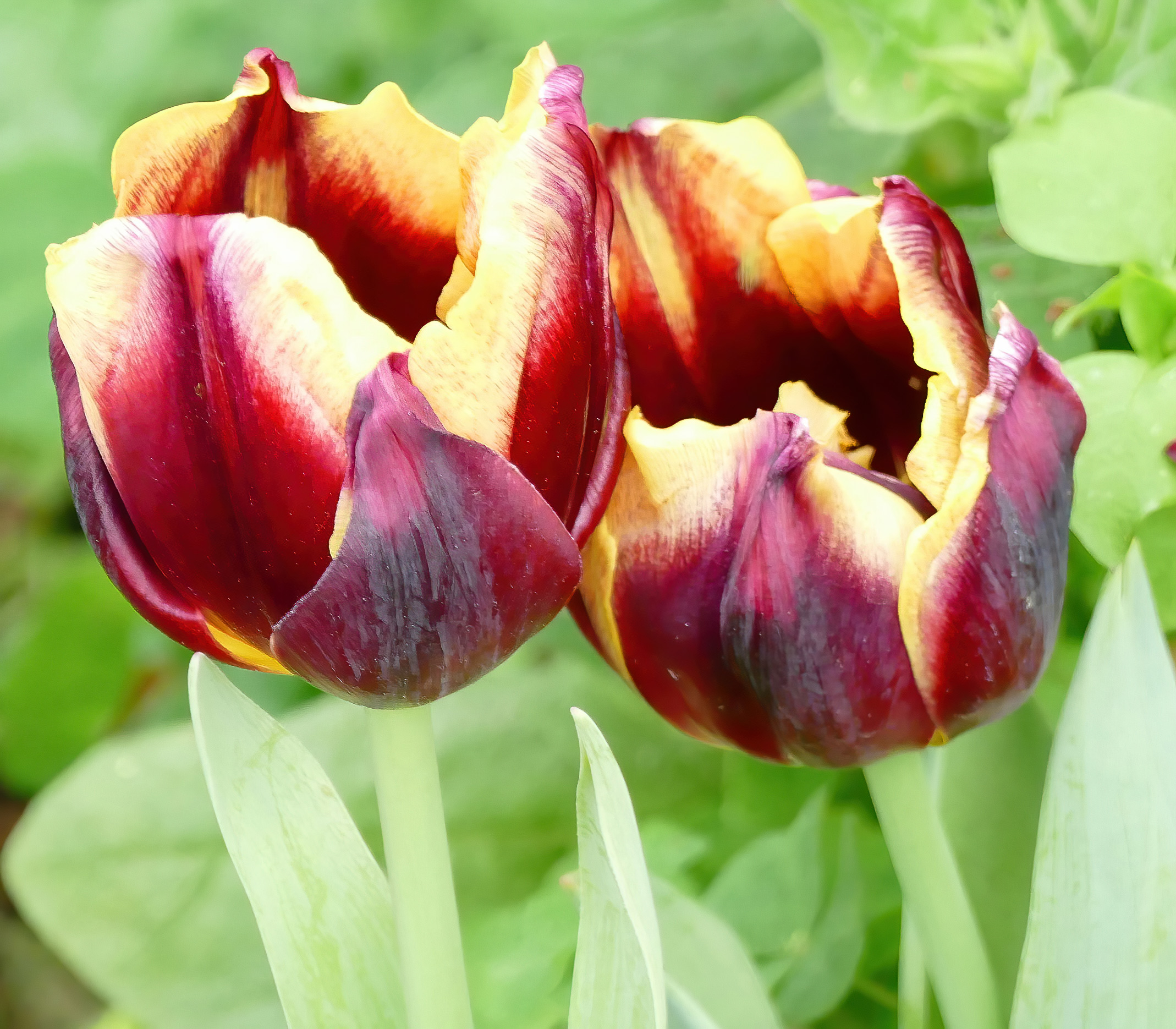
'Gavota', a division 3 cultivar

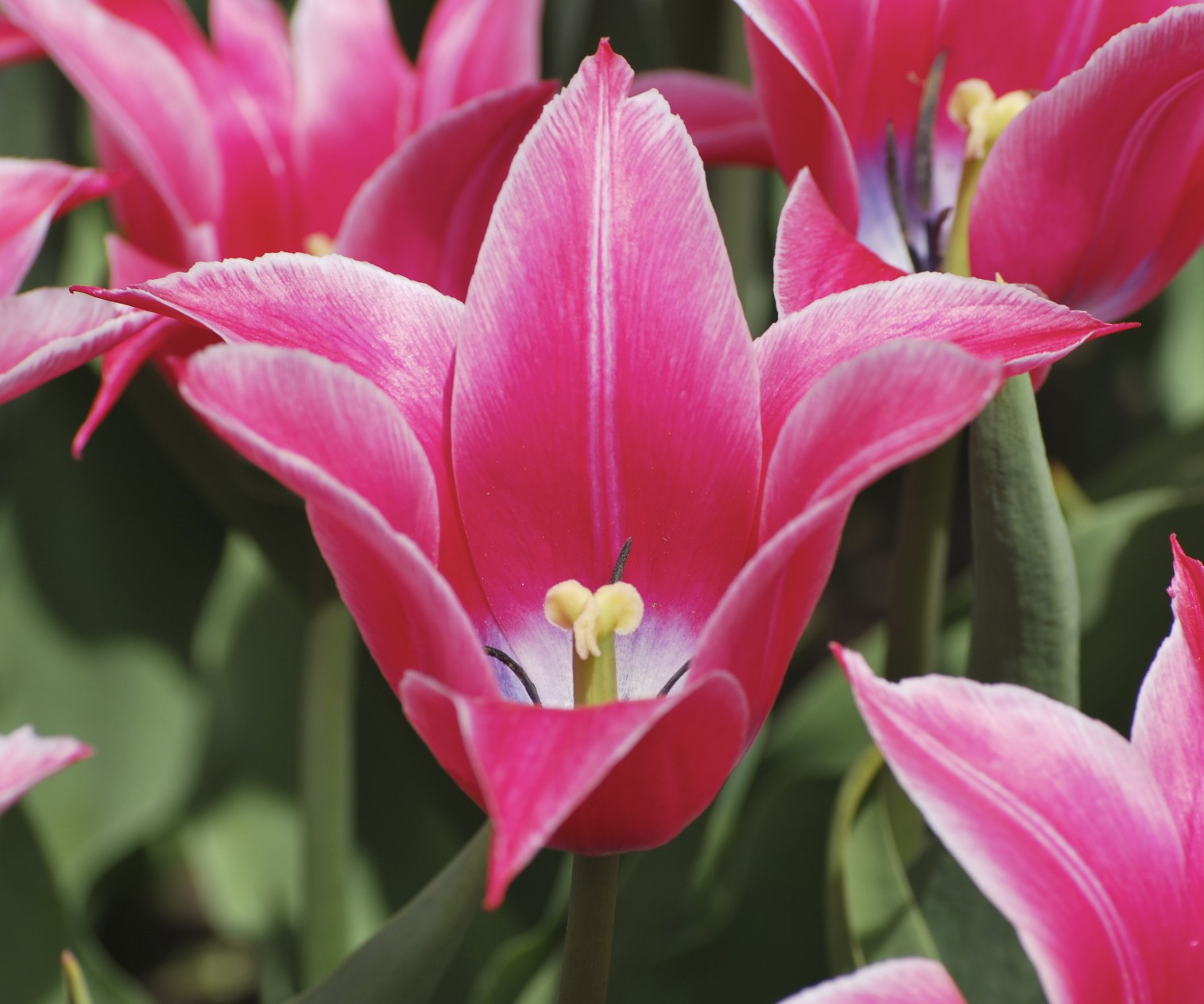
'Yonina', a division 6 cultivar

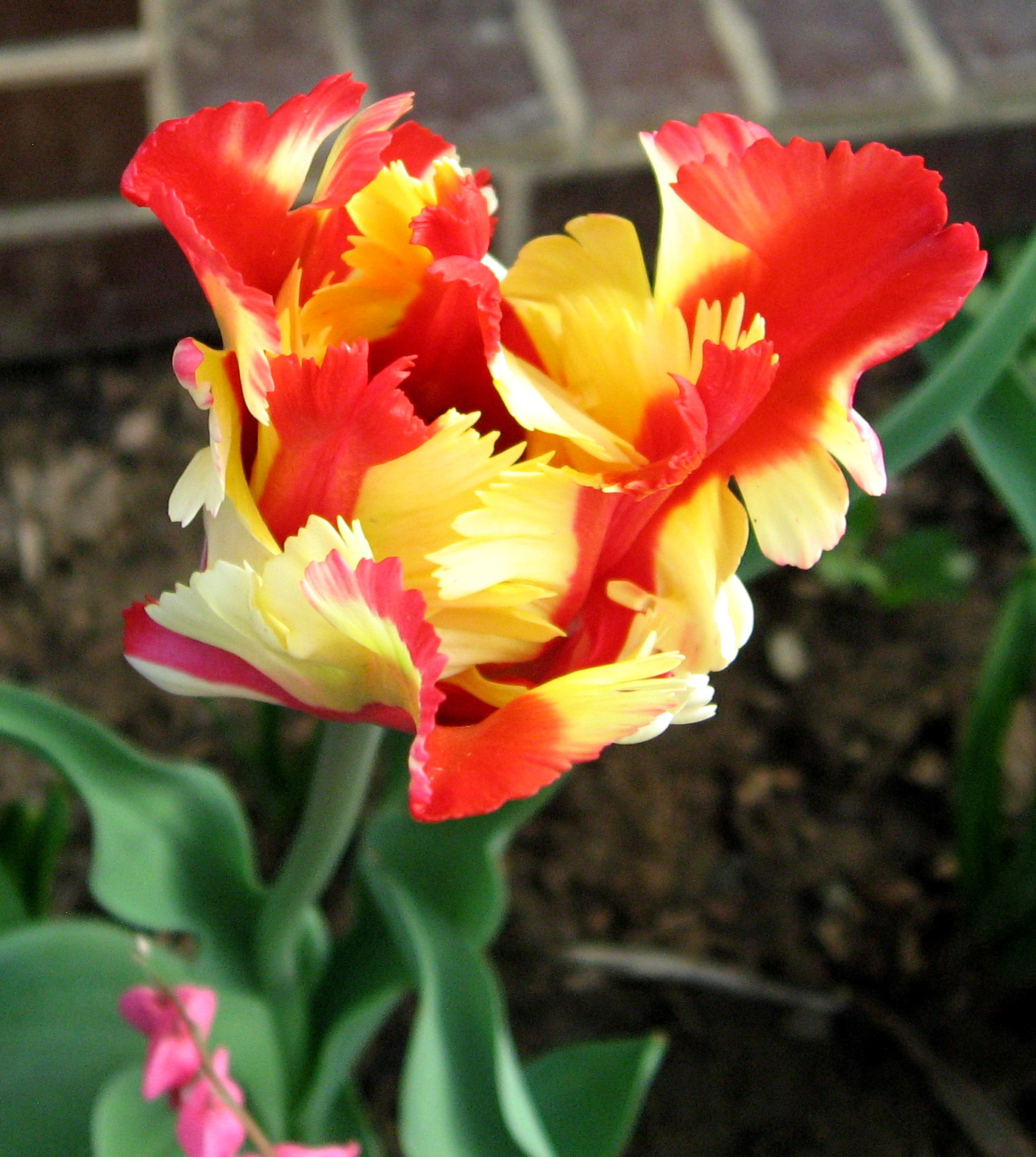
'Texas Flame', a division 10 cultivar

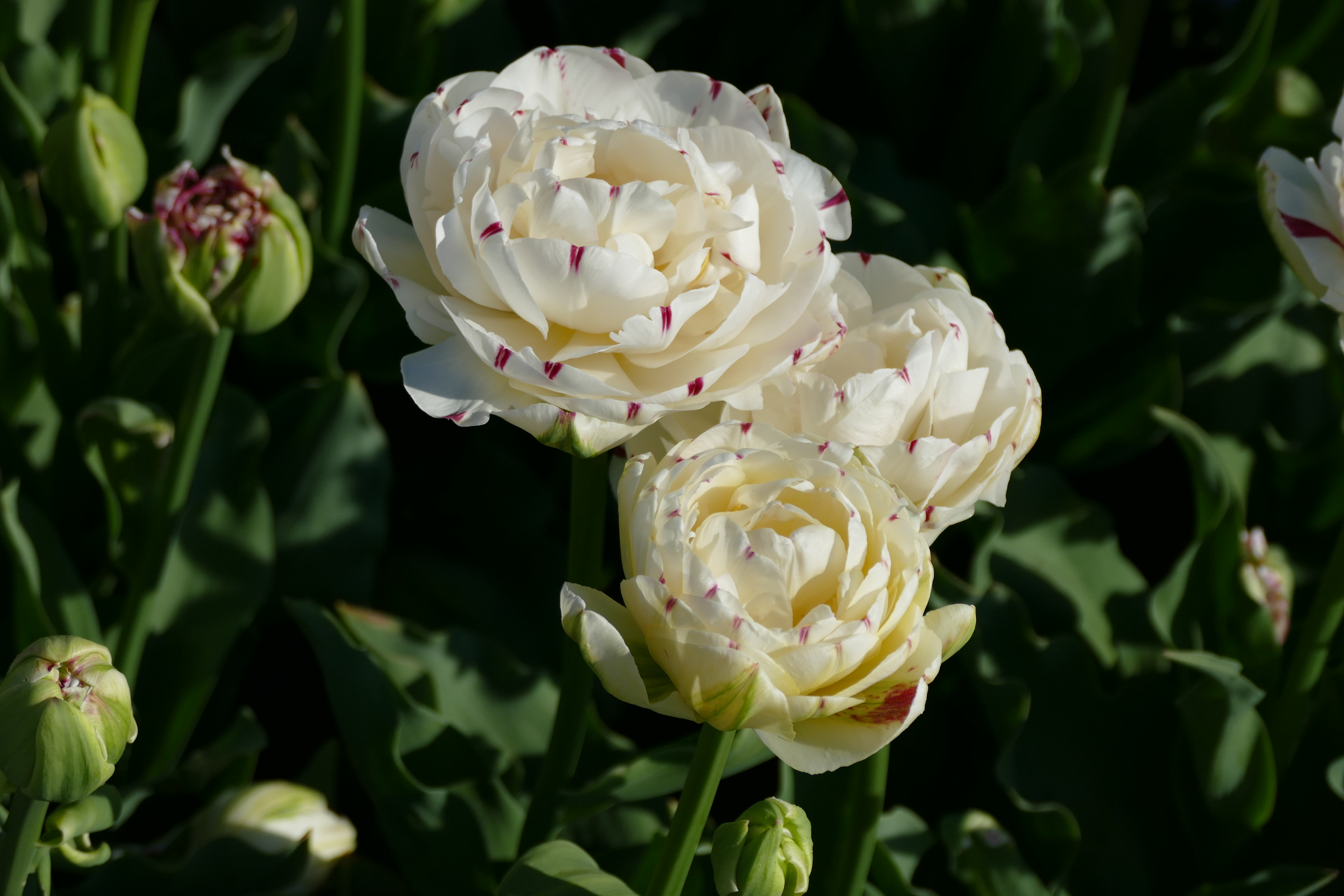
'Dance Line', a division 11 cultivar

In horticulture, tulips are divided into fifteen groups (Divisions) mostly based on flower morphology and plant size.

- Div. 1: Single early – with cup-shaped single flowers, no larger than 8 cm (3 inches) across. They bloom early to mid-season. Growing 15 to 45 cm (6 to 18 inches) tall.
- Div. 2: Double early – with fully double flowers, bowl shaped to 8 cm (3 inches) across. Plants typically grow from 30–40 cm (12–16 inches) tall.
- Div. 3: Triumph – single, cup shaped flowers up to 6 cm (2.5 inches) wide. Plants grow 35–60 cm (14–24 inches) tall and bloom mid to late season.
- Div. 4: Darwin hybrid – single flowers are ovoid in shape and up to 6 cm (2.5 inches) wide. Plants grow 50–70 cm (20–28 inches) tall and bloom mid to late season. This group should not be confused with older Darwin tulips, which belong in the Single Late Group below.
- Div. 5: Single late – cup or goblet-shaped flowers up to 8 cm (3 inches) wide, some plants produce multi-flowering stems. Plants grow 45–75 cm (18–30 inches) tall and bloom late season.
- Div. 6: Lily-flowered – the flowers possess a distinct narrow 'waist' with pointed and reflexed petals. Previously included with the old Darwins, only became a group in their own right in 1958.
- Div. 7: Fringed (Crispa) – cup or goblet-shaped blossoms edged with spiked or crystal-like fringes, sometimes called "tulips for touch" because of the temptation to "test" the fringes to see if they are real or made of glass. Perennials with a tendency to naturalise in woodland areas, growing 45–65 cm (18–26 inches) tall and blooming in late season.
- Div. 8: Viridiflora
- Div. 9: Rembrandt
- Div. 10: Parrot
- Div. 11: Double late – Large, heavy blooms. They range from 46 to 56 cm (18 to 22 inches) tall.
- Div. 12: Kaufmanniana – Waterlily tulip. Medium-large creamy yellow flowers marked red on the outside and yellow at the centre. Stems 15 cm (6 inches) tall.
- Div. 13: Fosteriana (Emperor)
- Div. 14: Greigii – Scarlet flowers 15 cm (6 inches) across, on 15-centimetre (6 in) stems. Foliage mottled with brown.
- Div. 15: Species or Botanical – The terms "species tulips" and "botanical tulips" refer to wild species in contrast to hybridised varieties. As a group they have been described as being less ostentatious but more reliably vigorous as they age.
- Div. 16: Multiflowering – not an official division, these tulips belong in the first 15 divisions but are often listed separately because they have multiple blooms per bulb.

They may also be classified by their flowering season:

- Early flowering: Single Early Tulips, Double Early Tulips, Greigii Tulips, Kaufmanniana Tulips, Fosteriana Tulips, Species Tulips
- Mid-season flowering: Darwin Hybrid Tulips, Triumph Tulips, Parrot Tulips
- Late season flowering: Single Late Tulips, Double Late Tulips, Viridiflora Tulips, Lily-flowering Tulips, Fringed (Crispa) Tulips, Rembrandt Tulips

==== Neo-tulipae ====
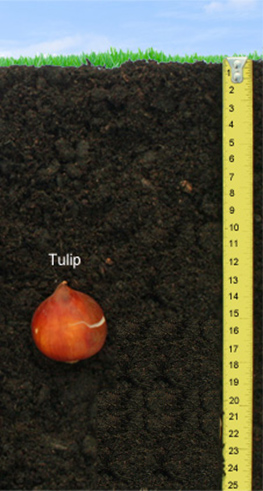
Tulip bulb planting depth 15 cm (6 inches)

A number of names are based on naturalised garden tulips and are usually referred to as neo-tulipae. These are often difficult to trace back to their original cultivar, and in some cases have been occurring in the wild for many centuries. The history of naturalisation is unknown, but populations are usually associated with agricultural practices and are possibly linked to saffron cultivation. Some neo-tulipae have been brought into cultivation, and are often offered as botanical tulips. These cultivated plants can be classified into two Cultivar Groups: 'Grengiolensis Group', with picotee tepals, and the 'Didieri Group' with unicolorous tepals.

== Consumption and toxicity ==
As with other plants of the lily family, tulips are poisonous to domestic animals including horses, cats, and dogs. In cats, ingestion of small amounts of tulips can cause vomiting, depression, diarrhoea, hypersalivation, and irritation of the mouth and throat, and larger amounts can cause abdominal pain, tremors, tachycardia, convulsions, tachypnea, difficulty breathing, cardiac arrhythmia, and coma. All parts of the tulip plant are poisonous to cats, while the bulb is especially dangerous. A veterinarian should be contacted immediately if a cat has ingested tulip. In the American East, white-tailed deer eat tulips with no apparent ill effects.

Humans generally do not eat tulip bulbs, as they are slow to cultivate and safe preparation practices are not widely known. Although they resemble onions and are occasionally cooked as such, this has led to illness. In the Netherlands they were used as an ersatz ingredient and poverty food during the famine of 1944–45, and some chefs continue to offer them as a delicacy. Removal of the germ (the young stem) is an important preparation step. People who handle tulip bulbs extensively can develop contact dermatitis, known as "tulip fingers", caused by the defensive chemical tulipalin A. The petals are edible to humans, as are the leaves, although some people are allergic.

== In culture ==
=== Iran ===
The celebration of Persian New Year, or Nowruz, dating back over 3,000 years, marks the advent of spring, and tulips are used as a decorative feature during the festivities.

The 12th century Persian tragic romance, Khosrow and Shirin, similar to the tale of Romeo and Juliet, tells of tulips sprouting where the blood of the young prince Farhad spilt after he killed himself upon hearing the (deliberately false) story that his true love had died.

The tulip was a topic for Persian poets from the thirteenth century. The poem Gulistan by Musharrifu'd-din Saadi, described a visionary garden paradise with "The murmur of a cool stream / bird song, ripe fruit in plenty / bright multicoloured tulips and fragrant roses...". Tulips have featured in the poems of Simin Behbahani.

The tulip is the national symbol for martyrdom in Iran (and Shi'ite Islam generally), and has been used on postage stamps and coins. It was common as a symbol used in the 1979 Islamic Revolution, and a red tulip adorns the flag redesigned in 1980. The sword in the centre, with four crescent-shaped petals around it, create the word "Allah" as well as symbolising the five pillars of Islam. The tomb of Ayatollah Ruhollah Khomeini is decorated with 72 stained glass tulips, representing 72 martyrs who died at the Battle of Karbala in 680 CE. It was also used as a symbol on billboards celebrating casualties of the 1980–1988 war with Iraq.

The tulip also became a symbol of protest against the Iranian government after the presidential election in June 2009, when millions turned out on the streets to protest the re-election of Mahmoud Ahmadinejad. After the protests were harshly suppressed, the Iranian Green Movement adopted the tulip as a symbol of their struggle.

The word for tulip in Persian is "laleh" (لاله), and this has become popular as a girl's name. The name has been used for commercial enterprises, such as the Laleh International Hotel, as well as public facilities, such as Laleh Park and Laleh Hospital, and the tulip motif remains common in Iranian culture.

Iranian 20 rial coin

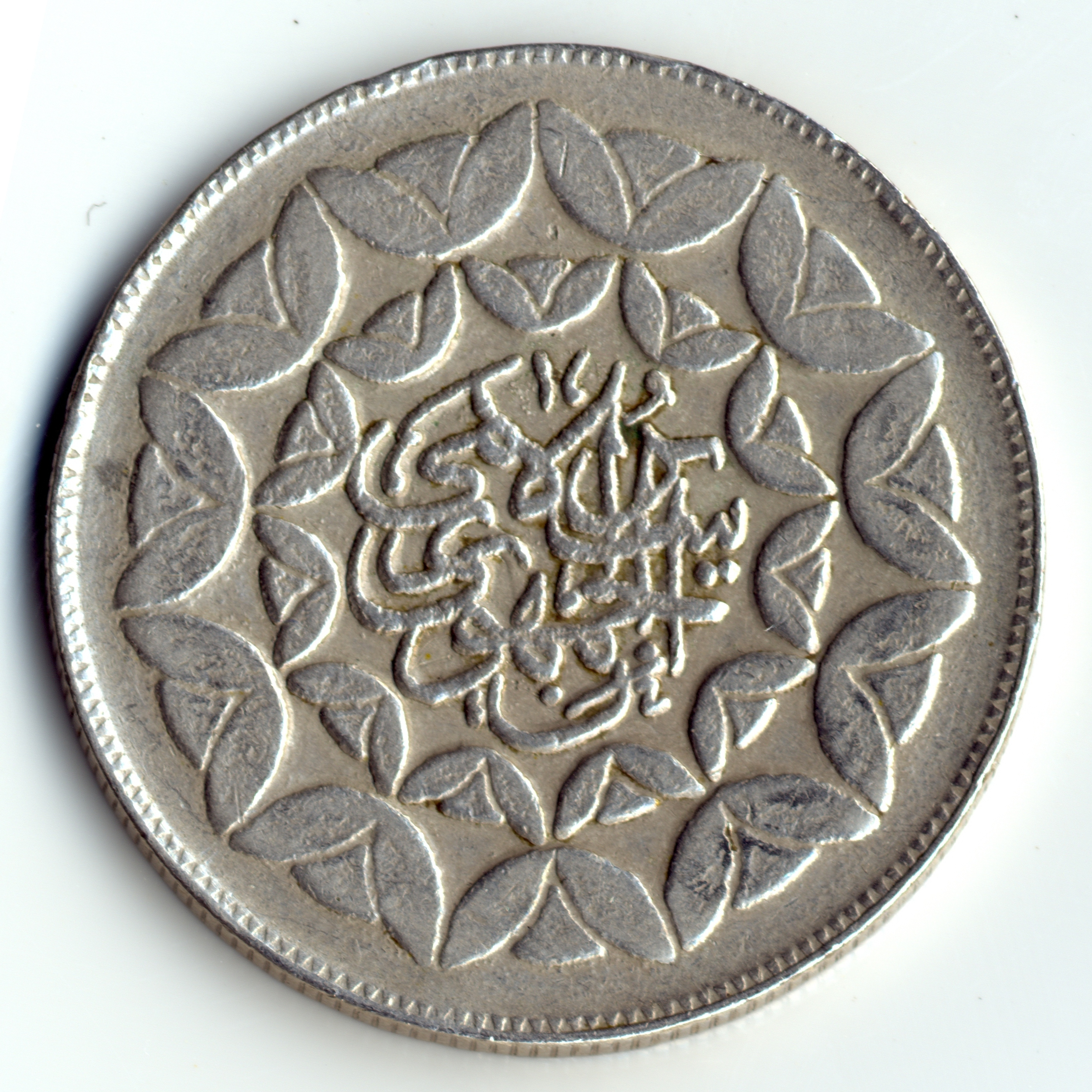
Obverse with 22 tulips

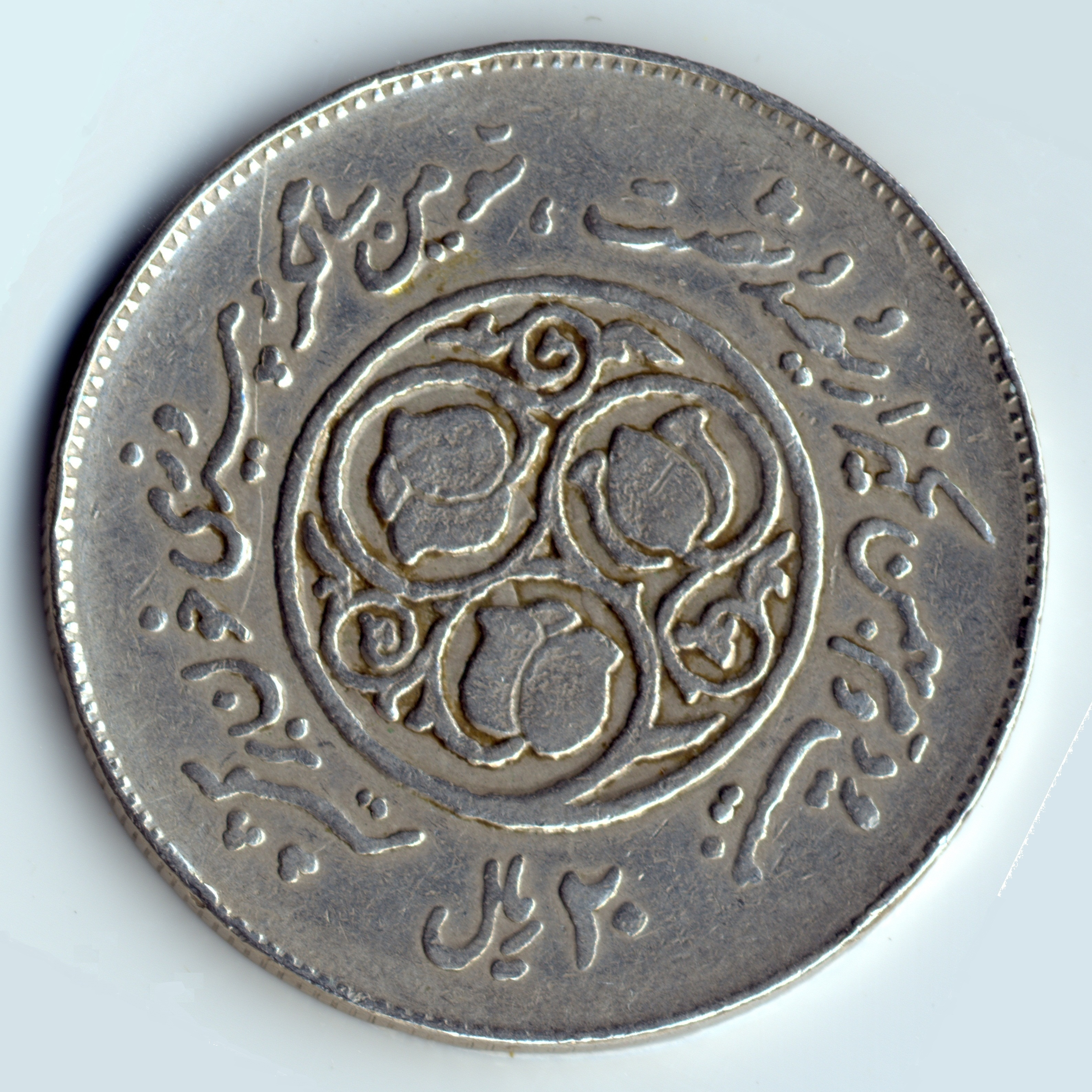
Reverse with three tulips

=== Other cultures ===
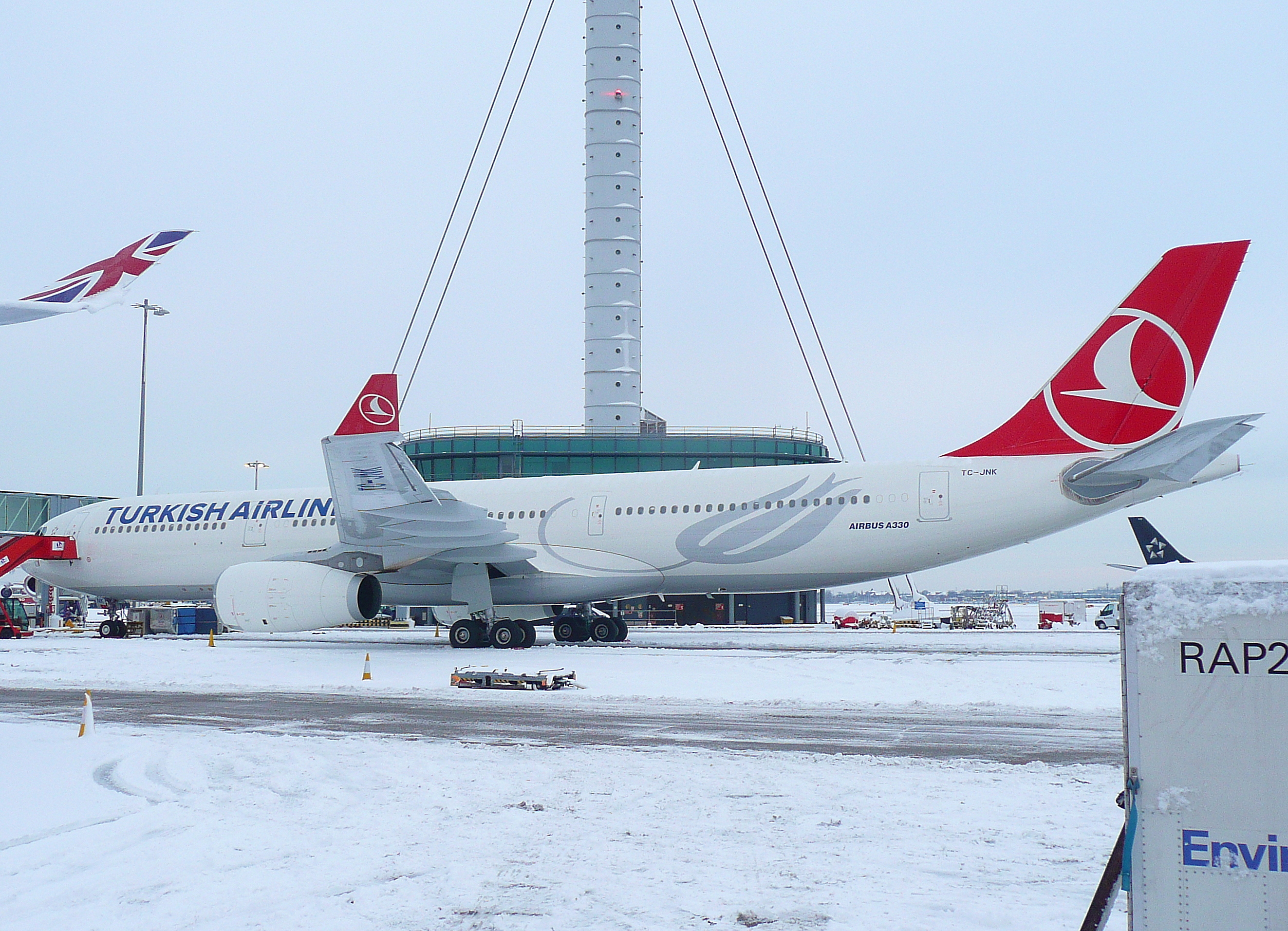
Turkish Airlines uses a grey tulip emblem on its aircraft.

Tulips are called lale in Turkish (from the Persian: لاله, romanized: laleh from لال lal 'red'). When written in Arabic letters, lale has the same letters as Allah, which is why the flower became a holy symbol. It was also associated with the House of Osman, resulting in tulips being widely used in decorative motifs on tiles, mosques, fabrics, crockery, etc. in the Ottoman Empire. The tulip was seen as a symbol of abundance and indulgence. The era during which the Ottoman Empire was wealthiest is often called the Tulip era or Lale Devri in Turkish.

Tulips became popular garden plants in the east and west, but, whereas the tulip in Turkish culture was a symbol of paradise on earth and had almost a divine status, in the Netherlands it represented the briefness of life.

By contrast to other flowers such as the coneflower or lotus flower, tulips have historically been capable of genetically reinventing themselves to suit changes in aesthetic values. In his 1597 herbal, John Gerard says of the tulip that "nature seems to play more with this flower than with any other that I do know". When in the Netherlands, beauty was defined by marbled swirls of vivid contrasting colours, the petals of tulips were able to become "feathered" and "flamed". However, in the 19th century, when the English desired tulips for carpet bedding and massing, the tulips were able to once again accommodate this by evolving into "paint-filled boxes with the brightest, fattest dabs of pure pigment". This inherent mutability of the tulip even led the Ottoman Turks to believe that nature cherished this flower above all others.

The Dutch regarded the flower's lack of scent as a virtue, representing chasteness. The Black Tulip (1850) is a historical romance by Alexandre Dumas, père. The story takes place in the Dutch city of Haarlem, where a reward is offered to the first grower who can produce a truly black tulip.

The tulip occurs on a number of the Major Arcana cards of occultist Oswald Wirth's deck of Tarot cards, specifically the Magician, Emperor, Temperance and the Fool, described in his 1927 work Le Tarot, des Imagiers du Moyen Âge.

=== Tulip festivals ===
Tulip festivals are held around the world, for example in the Netherlands and Spalding, England. There is also a popular festival in Morges, Switzerland. Every spring, there are tulip festivals in North America, including the Tulip Time Festival in Holland, Michigan, the Skagit Valley Tulip Festival in Skagit Valley, Washington, the Tulip Time Festival in Orange City and Pella, Iowa, and the Canadian Tulip Festival in Ottawa, Ontario, Canada. Tulips are also popular in Australia and several festivals are held in September and October, during the Southern Hemisphere's spring. The Indira Gandhi Memorial Tulip Garden in India hosts an annual tulip festival which draws huge attention and has an attendance of over 200,000.

== See also ==
- List of Award of Garden Merit tulips
- Tulip period – Period in Ottoman history
- Dahlia – Genus of flowering plants in the daisy family

== General and cited works ==
=== Books ===
- Botschantzeva, Z. P. (1982). Tulips: taxonomy, morphology, cytology, phytogeography and physiology. CRC Press. p. 120. ISBN 978-90-6191-029-9.
- Clusius, Carolus (1951). A Treatise on Tulips. Translated by W. van Dijk. Haarlem: Associated Bulb Growers of Holland. (Translation of a section from the Rariorum plantarum historia, 1601: see Clusius (1601))
- Clusius, Carolus (1601). Rariorum plantarum historia: quae accesserint, proxima pagina docebit. Antwerp: Ioannem Moretum.
- Dash, Mike (1999). Tulipomania: The Story Of The World's Most Coveted Flower & The Extraordinary Passions It Aroused. London: Orion Publishing Group. ISBN 978-1-78022-057-4.
- Davis, PH, ed. (1984). Flora of Turkey and the East Aegean islands volume 8. Edinburgh University Press. ISBN 978-0852244944.
- Everett, Diana (2013). The Genus Tulipa: Tulips of the World. Kew Publishing. ISBN 978-1-84246-481-6.
- Goldgar, Anne (2007). Tulipmania: Money, Honor, and Knowledge in the Dutch Golden Age. Chicago: University of Chicago Press. ISBN 9780226301303.
- Grey-Wilson, C.; Matthews, V. A. "Tulipa L.". In Tutin et al (1980), pp. 28–34.
- Hall, A. Daniel (1940). The genus Tulipa. London: Royal Horticultural Society.
- King, Michael (2005). Gardening with Tulips. Portland, OR: Timber Press. ISBN 978-0-88192-744-3.
- Linnaeus, Carl (1753). "Tulipa". Species Plantarum. Vol. 1. Vol. 1. Impensis Laurentii Salvii. pp. 305–306. see also Species Plantarum
- Marais, W. "Tulipa". In Davis (1984), pp. 302–311.
- Pavord, Anna (1999). The Tulip. London: Bloomsbury Publishing. ISBN 978-0-7475-4296-4.
- Pollan, Michael (2001). The Botany of Desire: A Plant's-Eye View of the World. New York: Random House. ISBN 9780375501296.
- Papiomitoglou, Vangelis (2006). Wild flowers of Greece. Mediterraneo Editions. ISBN 9789608227743.
- Tutin, T. G.; et al., eds. (1980). Flora Europaea. Volume 5, Alismataceae to Orchidaceae (monocotyledones). Cambridge, England: Cambridge University Press. ISBN 978-0521201087.
- Tenenbaum, Frances, ed. (2003). Taylor's Encyclopedia of Garden Plants. Houghton Mifflin. ISBN 978-0-618-22644-3.

=== Articles ===
- Christenhusz, Maarten J.M.; Govaerts, Rafaël; David, John C.; Hall, Tony; et al. (2013). "Tiptoe through the tulips – cultural history, molecular phylogenetics and classification of Tulipa (Liliaceae)". Botanical Journal of the Linnean Society. 172 (3): 280–328. doi:10.1111/boj.12061.
- Clennett, John C. B.; Chase, Mark W.; Forest, Félix; Maurin, Olivier; et al. (December 2012). "Phylogenetic systematics of Erythronium (Liliaceae): morphological and molecular analyses". Botanical Journal of the Linnean Society. 170 (4): 504–528. doi:10.1111/j.1095-8339.2012.01302.x.
- Eker, İsmail; Babaç, Mehmet Tekin; Koyuncu, Mehmet (29 January 2014). "Revision of the genus Tulipa L. (Liliaceae) in Turkey". Phytotaxa. 157 (1): 001. Bibcode:2014Phytx.157....1E. doi:10.11646/phytotaxa.157.1.1.
- Harvey, John H. (1976). "Turkey as a Source of Garden Plants". Garden History. 4 (3): 24–42. doi:10.2307/1586521. JSTOR 1586521.
- Sandler, Rivanne (2008). "Simin Behbahani's Poetic Conversations". Iranian Studies. 41 (1). Cambridge University Press. doi:10.1080/00210860701786603.
- Tan, Dun-Yan; Zhang, Zhen; Li, Xin-Rong; Hong, De-Yuan (2005). "Restoration of the genus Amana Honda (Liliaceae) based on a cladistic analysis of morphological characters" (PDF). Acta Phytotaxonomica Sinica (in Chinese). 43 (3): 262–270. doi:10.1360/aps040106 (inactive 12 July 2025).
- Turktas, Mine; Metin, Özge Karakaş; Baştuğ, Berk; Ertuğrul, Fahriye; et al. (July 2013). "Molecular phylogenetic analysis of Tulipa (Liliaceae) based on noncoding plastid and nuclear DNA sequences with an emphasis on Turkey". Botanical Journal of the Linnean Society. 172 (3): 270–279. doi:10.1111/boj.12040.
- Veldkamp, J. F.; Zonneveld, B. J. M. (2011). "The infrageneric nomenclature of Tulipa (Liliaceae)". Plant Systematics and Evolution. 298: 87–92. doi:10.1007/s00606-011-0525-0.

=== Websites ===
- Straley, Gerald B.; Utech, Frederick H. (2003). "Tulipa". Flora of North America Volume 26. p. 199.
- "Tulipa". The Plant List (2013). Version 1.1. 2013.
