= 2-Hydroxy-3-methyl-2-cyclopenten-1-one =

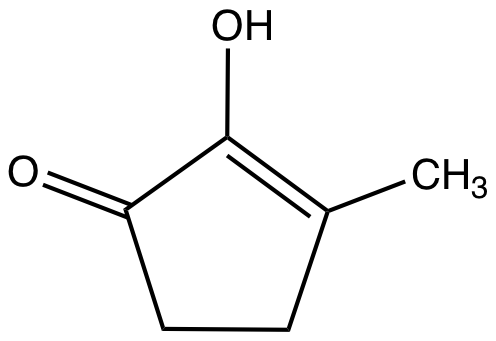

Names
- Preferred IUPAC name 3-Methylcyclopentane-1,2-dione
- Other names Maple lactone, Methylcyclopentenolone, Corylon

Identifiers
| CAS Number | 765-70-8; 80-71-7 (enol form) |
| 3D model (JSmol) | Interactive image |
| ChemSpider | 55153 |
| ECHA InfoCard | 100.001.186 |
| EC Number | 212-154-8 |
| PubChem CID | 61209; 6660 (enol form) |
| UNII | 627E92X64B |
| CompTox Dashboard (EPA) | DTXSID4035128 |
- InChI: InChI=1S/C6H8O2/c1-4-2-3-5(7)6(4)8/h4H,2-3H2,1H3 Key: OACYKCIZDVVNJL-UHFFFAOYSA-N
- SMILES: CC1C(=O)C(=O)CC1

Properties
| Chemical formula | C_{6}H_{8}O_{2} |
| Molar mass | 112.128 g·mol^{−1} |
| Density | 1.312 g/cm^{3} |
| Melting point | 104–108 °C (219–226 °F; 377–381 K) |
- Except where otherwise noted, data are given for materials in their standard state (at 25 °C [77 °F], 100 kPa). Infobox references

2-Hydroxy-3-methyl-2-cyclopenten-1-one is an organic compound related to 1,2-cyclopentanedione. It is the enol tautomer of the diketone 3-methylcyclopentane-1,2-dione. Being an enol, the compound is often called methylcyclopentenolone. It is a colorless solid.

== Synthesis and structure ==
The compound is prepared by base-catalyzed condensation of 1-hydroxyhexane-2,5-dione, a derivative of hydroxymethylfurfural.

The structure has been confirmed by X-ray crystallography. Quantum calculations also indicate that the enol is strongly favored relative to the diketo tautomer. Furthermore, the enolization occurs at the methyl-substituted carbon.

== Use and occurrence ==
It is one of many products from the pyrolysis of lignocellulose.

It is used in flavors and perfumery for its maple- or caramel-like odor. It contributes to the flavor or odor of many foods including wines, coffee, paprika, salmon and tobacco. It is sometimes called maple lactone because it occurs in maple syrup (it is not, however, a lactone).

== See also ==
- 1,2-Cyclopentanedione
