= 1,2-Cyclopentanedione =

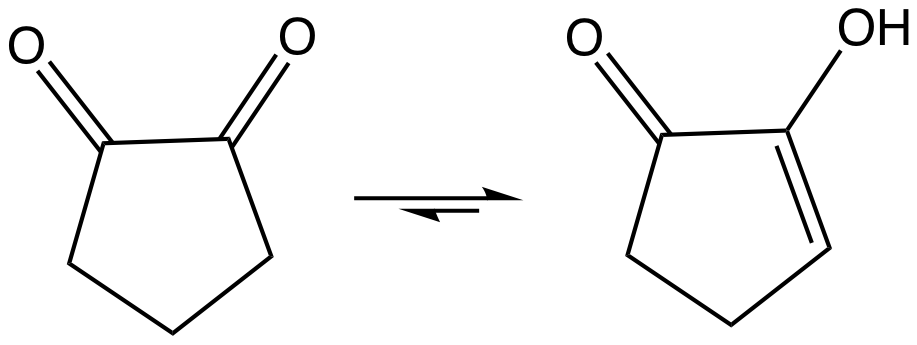

Names
- Preferred IUPAC name Cyclopentane-1,2-dione

Identifiers
CAS Number	3008-40-0
3D model (JSmol)	Interactive image
ChemSpider	492605
ECHA InfoCard	100.308.427
PubChem CID	566657
UNII	DQ8L4K1DLJ
CompTox Dashboard (EPA)	DTXSID60952490
- InChI: InChI=1S/C5H6O2/c6-4-2-1-3-5(4)7/h1-3H2 Key: CIISBNCSMVCNIP-UHFFFAOYSA-N
- SMILES: C1CC(=O)C(=O)C1

Properties
Chemical formula	C_{5}H_{6}O_{2}
Molar mass	98.101 g·mol^{−1}
Appearance	colorless liquid
Density	1.371 g/cm^{3}
Melting point	56 °C (133 °F; 329 K)
Boiling point	87–88 °C (189–190 °F; 360–361 K) (15 mm Hg)
- Except where otherwise noted, data are given for materials in their standard state (at 25 °C [77 °F], 100 kPa). Infobox references

1,2-Cyclopentanedione is the organic compound with the formula (CH_{2})_{3}(CO)_{2}. It is one of two isomeric cyclopentanediones, the other being 1,3-cyclopentanedione. It was first prepared by base-induced condensation of di ethylglutarate with diethyloxalate, followed by hydrolysis of the resulting diketodiester followed by decarboxylation. The enol is predicted to be about 1-3 kcal/mol more stable than the diketo form. The enol structure has been confirmed by X-ray crystallography.

Structurally related to 1,2-cyclopentanedione is 2-hydroxy-3-methyl-2-cyclopenten-1-one is a flavor additive, also called cyclotene.
