= 1,3-Cyclopentanedione =

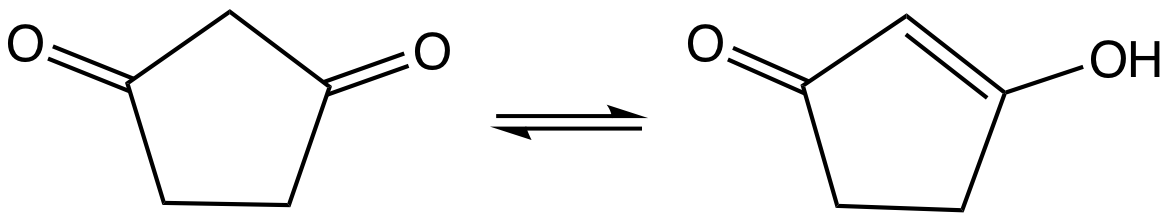

Names
- Preferred IUPAC name Cyclopentane-1,3-dione

Identifiers
CAS Number	3859-41-4
3D model (JSmol)	Interactive image
Beilstein Reference	1362728
ChEBI	CHEBI:41456
ChEMBL	ChEMBL224233
ChemSpider	69875
ECHA InfoCard	100.021.249
EC Number	223-372-8
Gmelin Reference	200797
PubChem CID	77466
UNII	98107S5K06
CompTox Dashboard (EPA)	DTXSID90191911
- InChI: InChI=1S/C5H6O2/c6-4-1-2-5(7)3-4/h1-3H2 Key: LOGSONSNCYTHPS-UHFFFAOYSA-N
- SMILES: C1CC(=O)CC1=O

Properties
Chemical formula	C_{5}H_{6}O_{2}
Molar mass	98.101 g·mol^{−1}
Appearance	White solid
Density	1.37 g/cm^{3}
Melting point	149–151 °C (300–304 °F; 422–424 K)

Hazards
- GHS labelling
Pictograms	(GHS07: Exclamation mark)
Signal word	Warning
Hazard statements	H315, H319, H335
Precautionary statements	P261, P264, P271, P280, P302+P352, P304+P340, P305+P351+P338, P312, P321, P332+P313, P337+P313, P362, P403+P233, P405, P501
- Except where otherwise noted, data are given for materials in their standard state (at 25 °C [77 °F], 100 kPa). Infobox references

1,3-Cyclopentanedione is an organic compound with the formula (CH_{2})_{3}(CO)_{2}. It is one of two isomeric cyclopentanediones, the other being 1,2-cyclopentanedione. The enol is predicted to be about 1-3 kcal/mol more stable than the diketo form. The enol structure has been confirmed by X-ray crystallography.

== Preparation ==
The compound is prepared by hydrogenation of 2-cyclopentene-1,4-dione using zinc/acetic acid.
