= Tulipalin A =

Names
- IUPAC name α-methylene-γ-butyrolactone
- Preferred IUPAC name 3-Methylideneoxolan-2-one
- Other names: TUPA

Identifiers
CAS Number	547-65-9
3D model (JSmol)	Interactive image
Beilstein Reference	107939
ChEBI	CHEBI:104120
ChemSpider	61647
ECHA InfoCard	100.008.120
EC Number	208-931-6
Gmelin Reference	746139
PubChem CID	68352
UNII	362Y256BOL
CompTox Dashboard (EPA)	DTXSID2074663
- InChI: InChI=1S/C5H6O2/c1-4-2-3-7-5(4)6/h1-3H2 Key: GSLDEZOOOSBFGP-UHFFFAOYSA-N
- SMILES: C=C1CCOC1=O

Properties
Chemical formula	C_{5}H_{6}O_{2}
Molar mass	98.101 g·mol^{−1}
Density	1.085 g/ml
Melting point	25 °C (77 °F; 298 K)
Boiling point	168 °C (334 °F; 441 K)
Solubility in water	Soluble in organic solvents like acetone and slightly soluble in water

Hazards
- GHS labelling
Pictograms	(GHS02: Flammable) (GHS07: Exclamation mark)
Signal word	Warning
Hazard statements	H226, H317
Precautionary statements	P210, P233, P240, P241, P242, P243, P261, P272, P280, P302+P352, P303+P361+P353, P321, P333+P313, P363, P370+P378, P403+P235, P501
- Except where otherwise noted, data are given for materials in their standard state (at 25 °C [77 °F], 100 kPa). Infobox references

Tulipalin A, also known as α-methylene-γ-butyrolactone, is a naturally occurring compound found in certain flowers such as tulips and alstroemerias. Tulipalin A has the molecular formula C_{5}H_{6}O_{2} and the CAS registry number 547-65-9. It is an allergen and has been known to cause occupational contact dermatitis, i.e. 'tulip fingers,' in some who are commonly exposed to it such as florists. It has been shown to be synthesized from tuliposide A in response to damage to the plant. When the plant is damaged, tuliposide A is broken down by tuliposide-converting enzymes (TCE) to produce tulipalin A. More recent experiments with this compound have uncovered potential applications for it in the field of polymerization.
