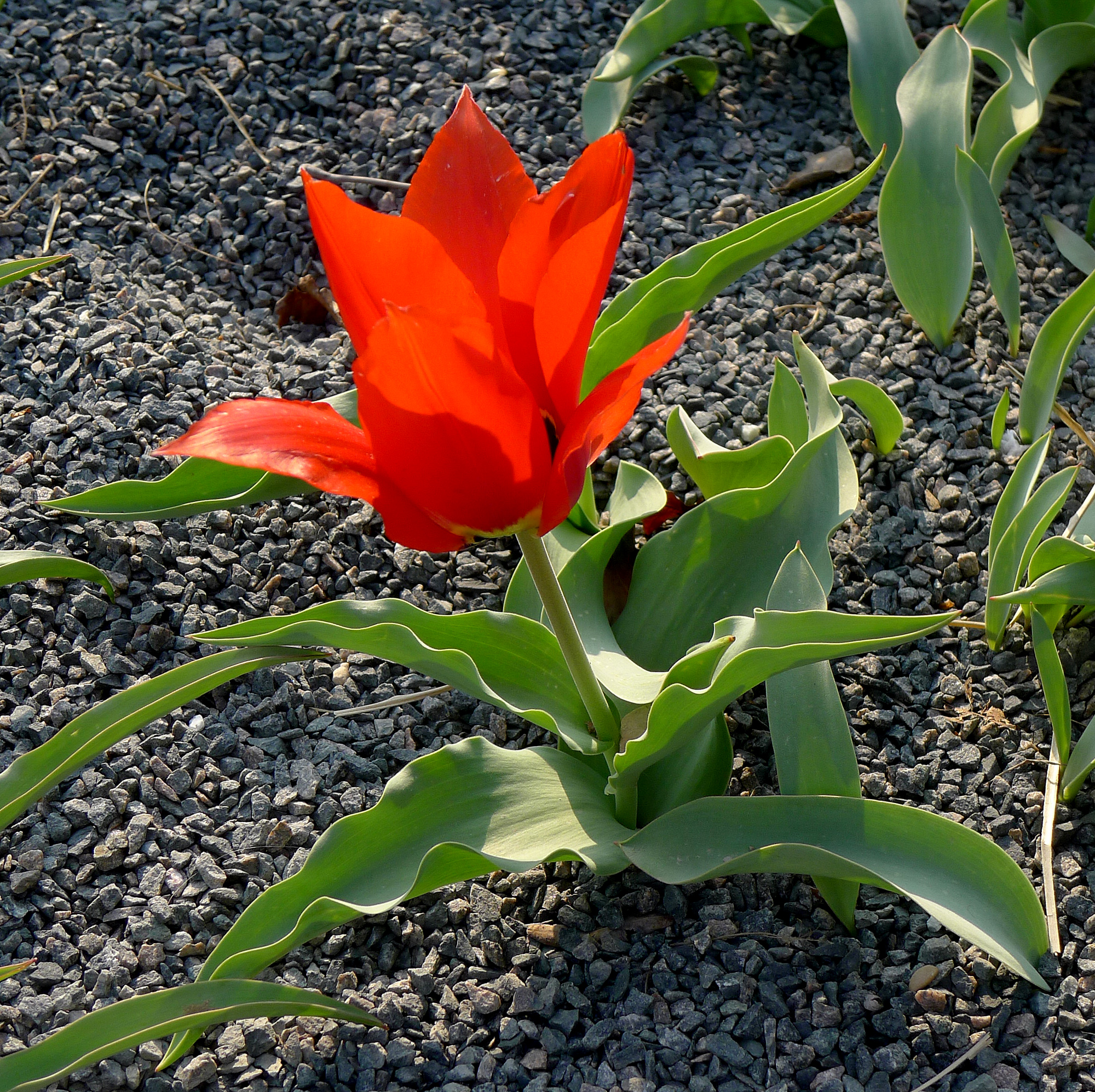
- Tulipa eichleri in Jardin des plantes, Paris

Scientific classification
- Kingdom: Plantae
- Clade: Embryophytes
- Clade: Tracheophytes
- Clade: Spermatophytes
- Clade: Angiosperms
- Clade: Monocots
- Order: Liliales
- Family: Liliaceae
- Subfamily: Lilioideae
- Genus: Tulipa
- Subgenus: Tulipa subg. Tulipa
- Species: T. eichleri

Binomial name
- Tulipa eichleri Regel

Synonyms
- None known

= Tulipa eichleri =

Species of flowering plant

Tulipa eichleri, commonly known as Eichler tulip or Eichler's tulip, is a species of tulip. It is a bulbous flowering perennial with long green leaves, deep red flowers with a central black blotch, coming from the Caucasus Mountains (between Europe and Asia).

It is thought to be a synonym of Tulipa undulatifolia Boiss. or a synonym of Tulipa undulatifolia var. undulatifolia by some sources.

== Description ==
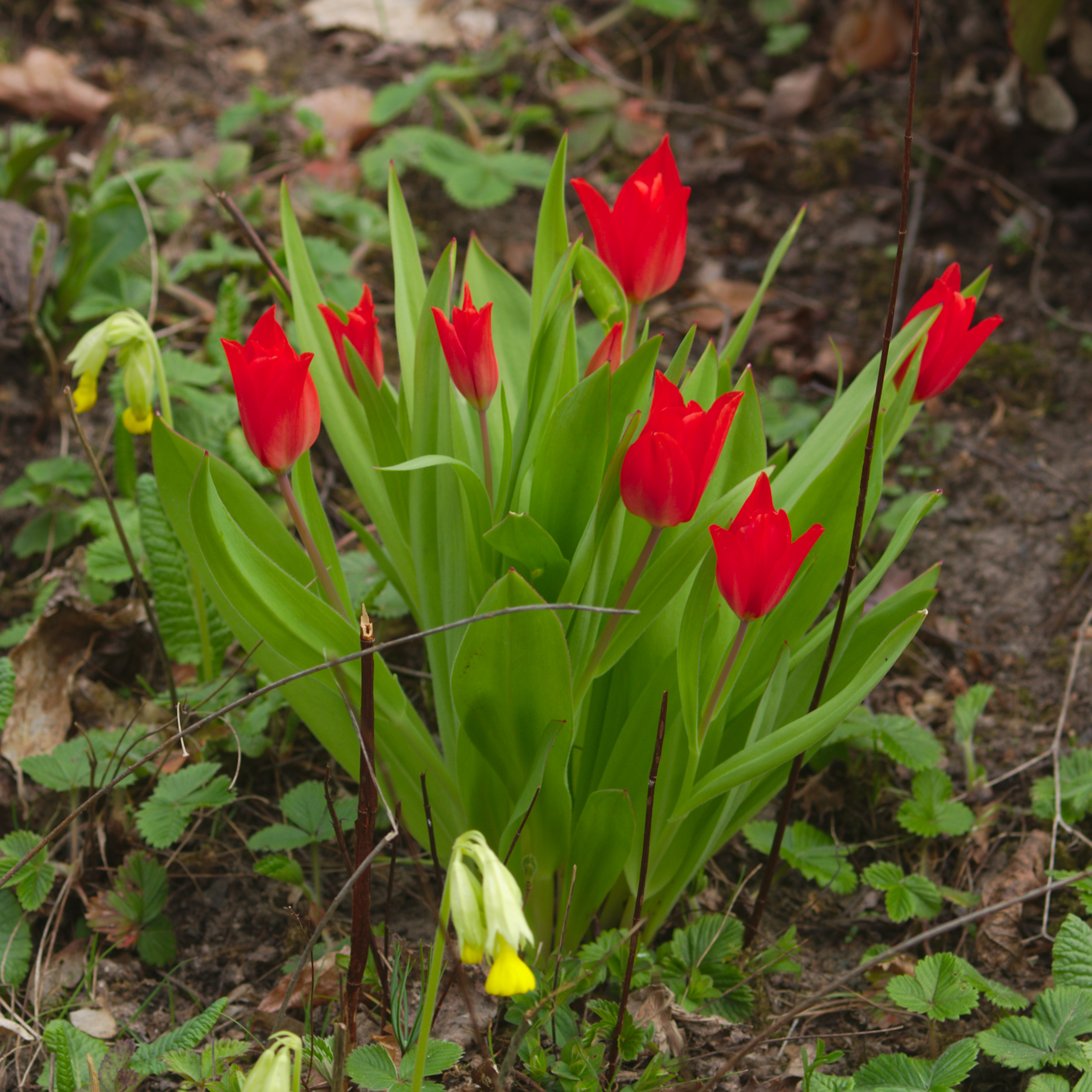
Tulipa eichleri at the Ecological Botanical Gardens of the University of Bayreuth, Germany

It is a perennial that grows from bulbs.

It has a tall, single flowering, upright stem which is covered with short hairs. The plant can reach between 25–30 cm (9.8–11.8 in) tall, or 10 to 12 inches tall.

It has large, broad, strap-like leaves. They are grey-green, or glaucous (bluish-green) with slightly undulating or wavy edges.

It flowers in early Spring, between April and May.

It has large flowers, one of the largest flowers of all the species tulips. They are bell shaped, or goblet-shaped, They don't have sepals, petals or bracts, just six simple tepals. The segments are obovate or obtuse in shape. The flower almost resembles the flowers of Tulipa gesneriana but differs in having a pubescent peduncle (flower stalk).

Tulipa eichleri flowers come in shades of red, from scarlet, bright red, orange, orange-red, crimson, to deep red. They also have a dark basal blotch, which is blue-black, or black. The blotch has a yellow ring, margin, or border around it.

The flowers close at night and they can resemble a "Christmas present with a bow on top".

=== Biochemistry ===
Anthocyanins have been found in various tulip flowers, such as Tulipa gesneriana, Tulipa fosteriana and also Tulipa eichleri.

The endosperm of the tulip has been studied.

== Taxonomy ==
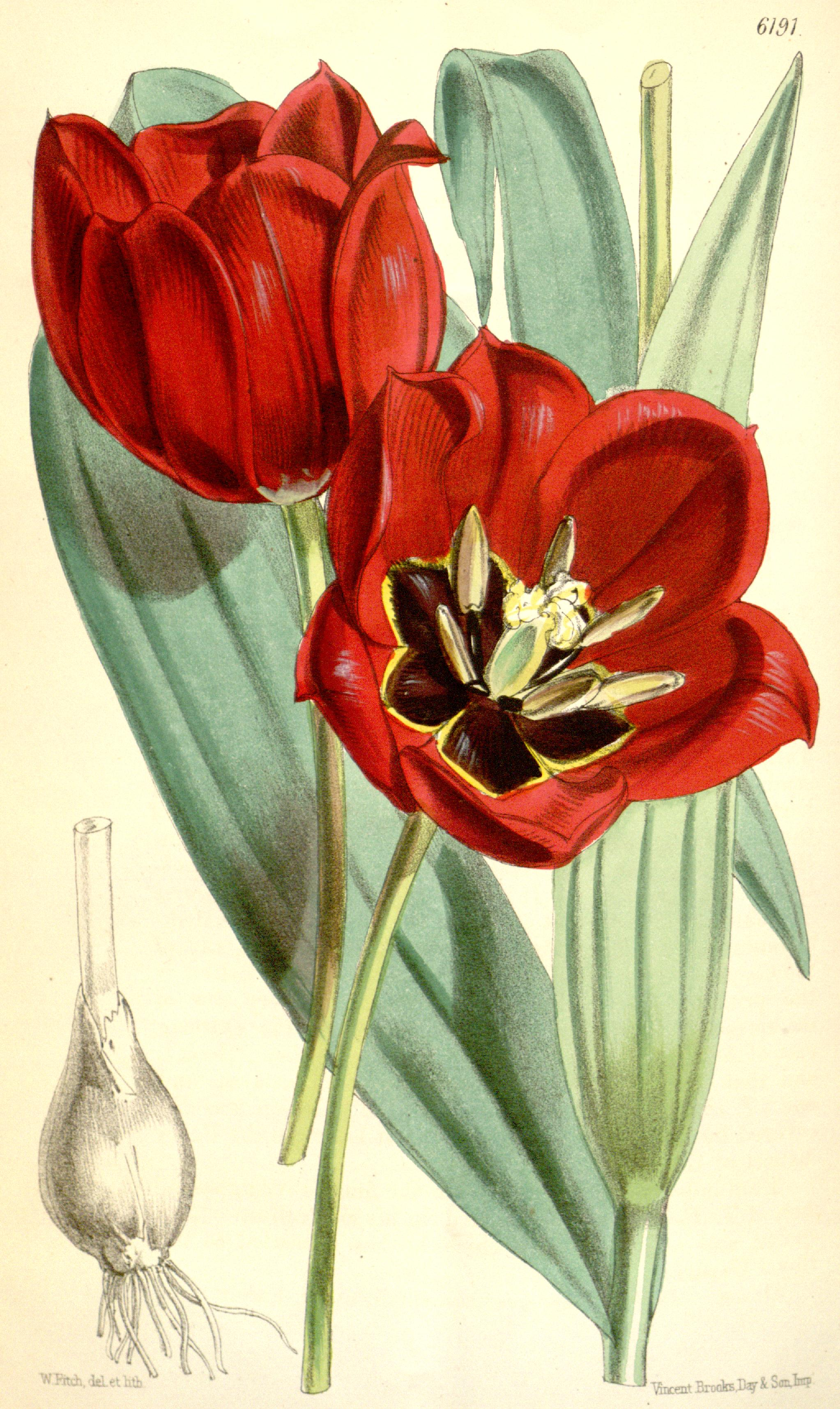
T. eichleri labelled as Tulipa undulatifolia var undulatifolia in Curtis's Botanical Magazine in 1875

The Latin specific epithet eichleri refers to German botanist August W. Eichler who found the tulip in the Caucasus.

It has the common name of 'Eichler Tulip' or 'Eichler's Tulip'.

It was first found in Turkestan, and then described and published as Tulipa eichleri by Eduard August von Regel in his botanical magazine 'Gartenflora' Vol.23 on page 193 in 1874.

It was then first cultivated in England in 1876 with bulbs sent by Prof. Eduard Regel.

In June 1932, it was given the RHS's Award of Garden Merit.

In 1982, David Mabberley in Taxon Vol.31 on pages 65–73, William Roxburgh's 'Botanical description of a new species of Swietenia (Mahogany) and other overlooked binomials in 36 vascular plant families'. He then renamed it as a synonym of Tulipa persica (Lindl.) Sweet (as it was native to Iran).

Then in 1984, P.H. Davis, in 'Flora of Turkey and the East Aegean Islands' Vol.8 on pages 1–632. It was renamed as Tulipa undulatifolia, which was agreed by the botanists at Kew. The RHS considered it to be a synonym of Tulipa undulatifolia Boiss, so do the United States Department of Agriculture and the Agricultural Research Service as of 6 August 2013. It is also in the World Economic Plants book as Tulipa undulatifolia, and other sources.

Then in 2013, D. Everett, in his book 'The genus Tulipa, Tulips of the world' by Kew publishing. He cited it as Tulipa undulatifolia var. undulatifolia. This name was accepted by the Pacific Bulb Society.

Although, Tulipa eichleri is still an accepted name by some botanic sources.

== Distribution and habitat ==
Tulipa eichleri is native to temperate areas of Central Asia.

=== Range ===
It is found in Turkey (previously known as Asia Minor,) and Iran, and the Caucasus Mountains, including the Transcaucasian region (South Caucasus or Georgia), and Azerbaijan.

Some sources also adds Greece to the list.

=== Habitat ===
It is found on dry slopes and in shrubby woods within the lower mountain belt altitudes.

It grows on the steppes of Georgia, with other plant species such as Seseli granivittatum, Teucrium nuchense, Teucrim pollium, Thymus tifisiensis, Scorzonera eriosperma, Psephellus carthialinicus, Carex bordzilowskii, Tulipa biebersteinii and Iris iberica.

== Conservation ==
It is very rare in the wild and is only occasionally cultivated.

It is listed (as part of the IUCN Red List or Red Data Book) as a Georgian Red Data species.

500 seeds have been placed in the Millennium Seed Bank Project.

In Georgia, the locations of many rare species (Tulipa eichleri and Iris iberica) are decreasing in numbers. Especially, near the roadsides and near the settled areas. This is due to the decimation of vegetation cover. Also, the impacts of irrigation systems and the change of use into land for agriculture (to grow cotton grass, wheat, barley, corn, and vines).

== Cultivation ==
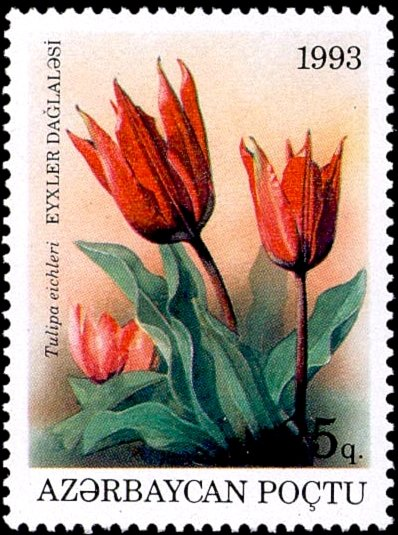
Stamp of Azerbaijan in 1993

It is only occasionally cultivated and generally only grown by specialist tulip growers, as it is also used for hybridization purposes.

It is hardy down to -30 °F (≈1 °C). In America, this equates to USDA Zones 4 through 8. A hot dry summer and cold winter is essential for the plant to re-flower again, so in warmer climates it is recommended that the bulbs should be dug up and chilled for 3–4 months and then planted out in mid winter or spring. They can remain undivided for several years within garden borders, rock gardens and in naturalized (grassy) areas, or in pots or containers, if they are given a feed of a top dressing every autumn. They can tolerate positions in full sun to partial shade, but prefer a sunny position. in soil that is humus rich, moist and well drained. They should be planted in fall or spring, 8 cm (3.1 in) apart and 13 cm (5.1 in) deep.

It is thought to be a vigorous plant that will multiply rapidly, but it can be propagated by offsets (mini bulblets coming off the side of the main bulb), but it may take up to 3 years before they flower. It is recommended that gardeners allow the foliage to die back or fade. Then the flower heads can be removed after blooming (or remove the seed pods, if they develop). These actions will allow the energy to go back into the bulb to produce next year's flowers.

== Culture ==
In 1993, a postage stamp in Azerbaijan within the flowers series was issued with an image of the tulip.

== Other sources ==
- Aldén, B., S. Ryman, & M. Hjertson Svensk Kulturväxtdatabas, SKUD (Swedish Cultivated and Utility Plants Database; online resource on www.skud.info). 2012 (Kulturvaxtdatabas)
- Erhardt, W. et al. Zander: Handwörterbuch der Pflanzennamen, 17. Auflage. 2002 (Zander ed17)
- Huxley, A., ed. The new Royal Horticultural Society dictionary of gardening. 1992 (Dict Gard)
- Komarov, V. L. et al., eds. Flora SSSR. 1934-1964 (F USSR)
- Marais, W. 1980. Notes on Tulipa (Liliaceae) Kew Bull. 35:259.
- Rechinger, K. H., ed. Flora iranica. 1963- (F Iran)
- Walters, S. M. et al., eds. European garden flora. 1986- (Eur Gard F)
