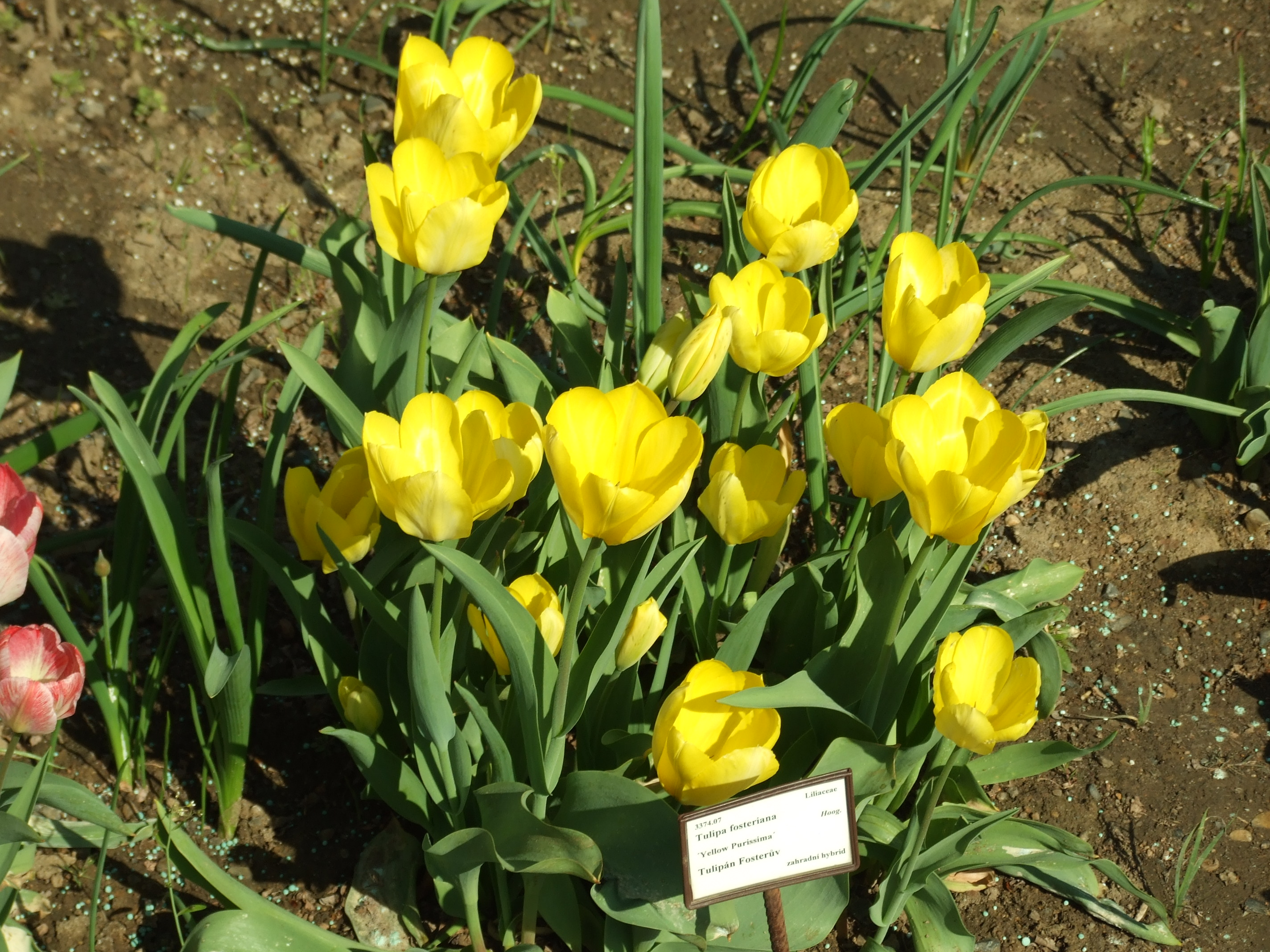
- In cultivation at the Prague Botanical Garden

Scientific classification
- Kingdom: Plantae
- Clade: Tracheophytes
- Clade: Angiosperms
- Clade: Monocots
- Order: Liliales
- Family: Liliaceae
- Subfamily: Lilioideae
- Tribe: Lilieae
- Genus: Tulipa
- Species: T. fosteriana

Binomial name
- Tulipa fosteriana W.Irving

Synonyms
- Tulipa affinis Botschantz.

= Tulipa fosteriana =

Species of flowering plant

Tulipa fosteriana is a species of tulip, native to the Pamir Mountains and nearby areas of Afghanistan, Kyrgyzstan, Tajikistan and Uzbekistan.

== Description ==
The plants can grow up to 40–55 cm (16–22 in) tall with a thick stem. It has 3–5 leaves, which are broadly ovate shaped and glaucous. It blooms in early mid spring, between March-April (or in St. Petersburg in May). It has large red flowers, often lined with black, They open out flat or cup-like in form. Inside, it has dark violet anthers which are twice as long as the stamens. It produces seed in June.

=== Biochemistry ===
Anthocyanins have been found in various tulip flowers, such as Tulipa gesneriana, Tulipa fosteriana and Tulipa eichleri.

== Taxonomy ==
The Latin specific epithet fosteriana refers to Michael Foster (a known British Iris expert).

Tulipa fosteriana was first published and described by Walter Irving (1867–1934), a British botanist, in Gard. Chron. III, Vol.39 on page 322 in 1906.

In 2013, the phylogenetic relationships in the genus using DNA sequences was used to determine the taxonomy and classifications. As result T. fosteriana was placed in 'Tulipa subgenus Tulipa' (along with Tulipa agenensis Redouté, Tulipa hungarica Borbás and Tulipa greigii Regel ) with the characteristics of; bulb tunics densely lined inside with rippled or silky hairs or (nearly) glabrous. Stamens without hairs orboss. Stigmas sessile.

== Distribution ==
T. fosteriana is native to temperate regions of Central Asia. It can be found in Afghanistan and Tajikistan.

=== Habitat ===
It is found in the wild on rocky scrub-covered hillsides, or on stony slopes at an altitude of 1,500 m (4,900 ft) above sea level.

== Cultivation ==
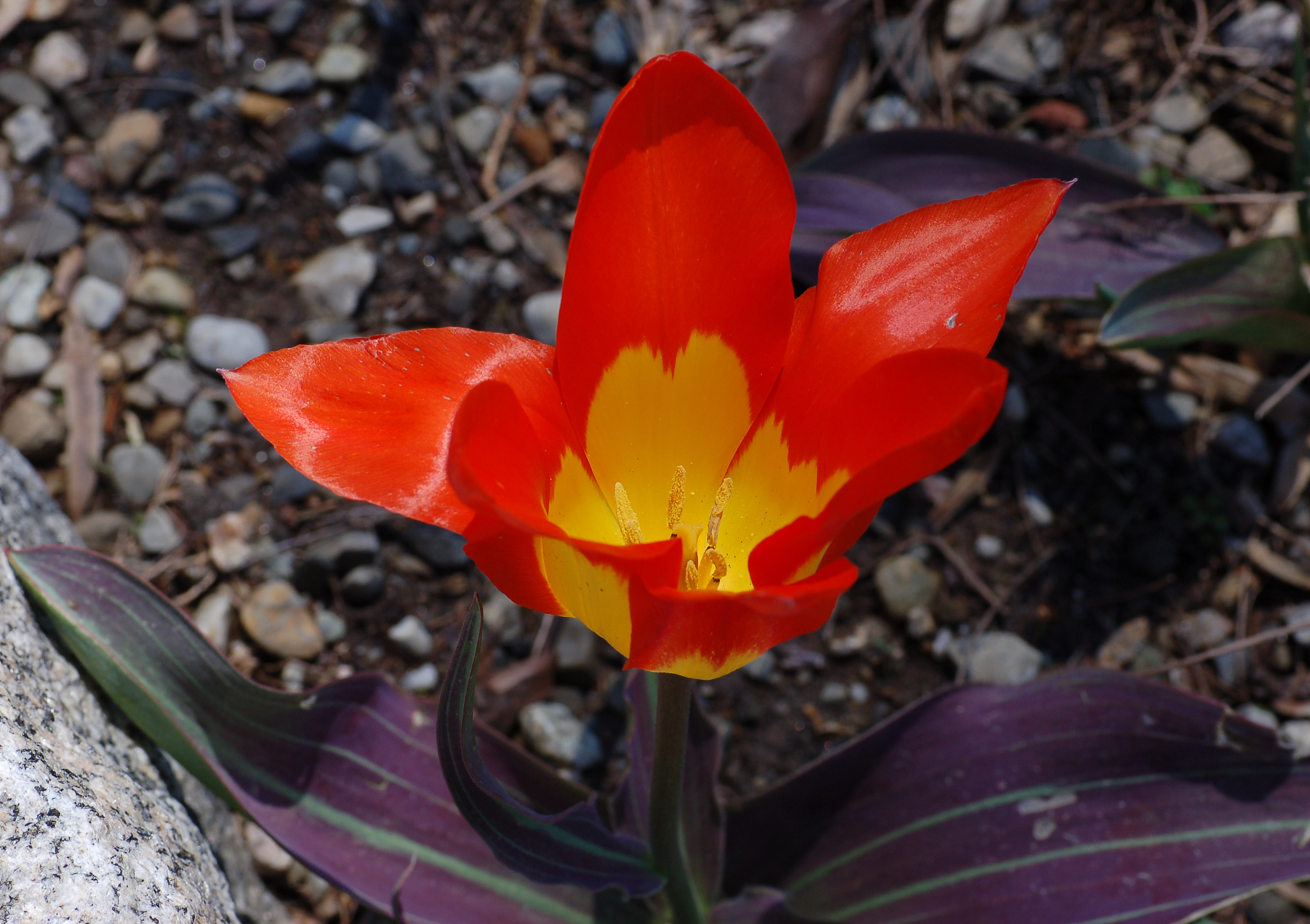
Tulipa cultivar 'Juan'

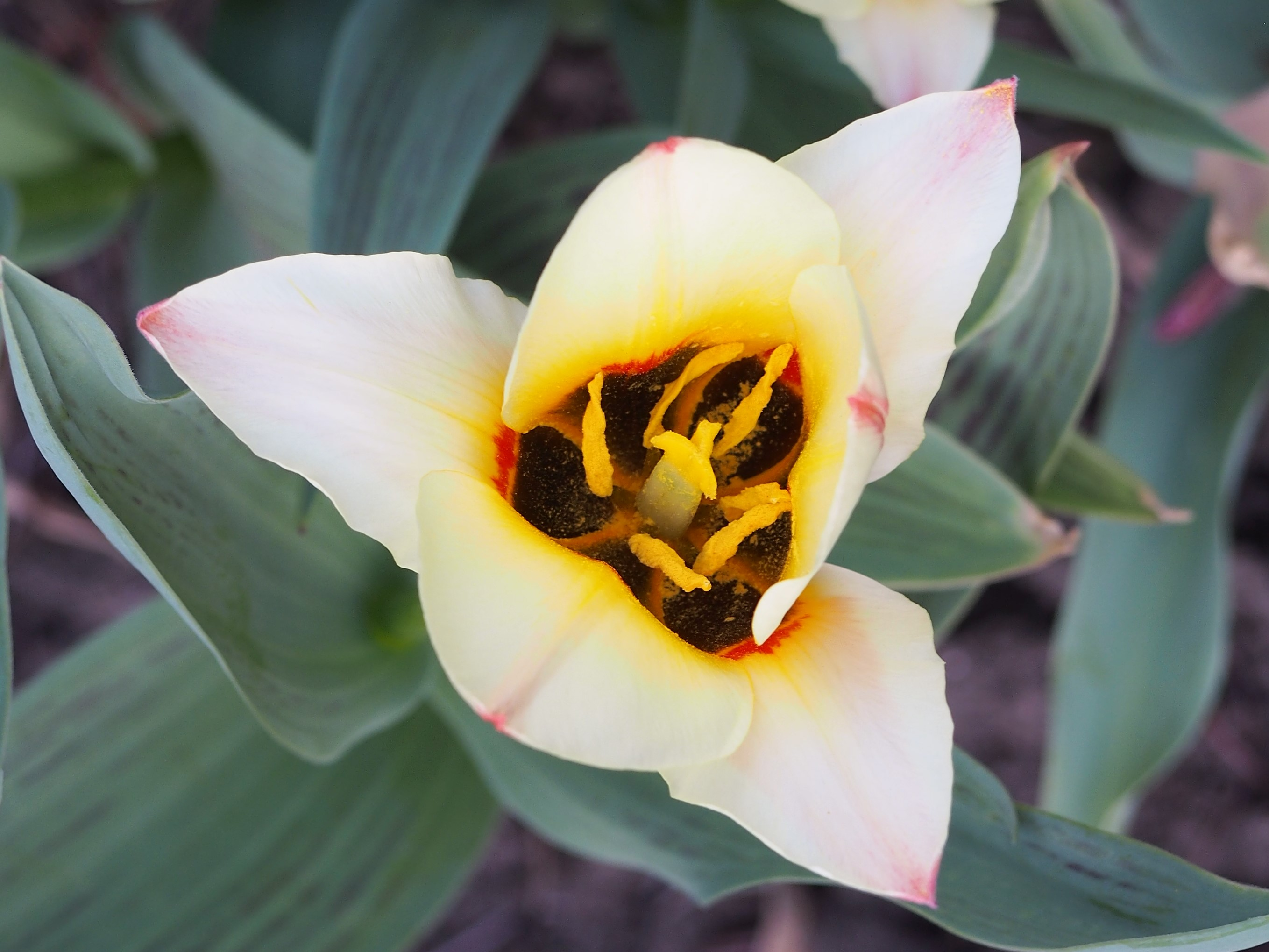
Tulipa cultivar 'Zombie'

Resistant to tulip breaking virus, it has been crossed into garden tulips (Tulipa × gesneriana).

They naturalize easily and can come back year after year in the garden. They are well suited to mixed borders and can also be used in bedding displays. They can grow in any garden soil but prefer sites in full sun. They also can be propagated vegetatively and also by seed. It can grow in USDA Hardiness Zones 3 to 8.

It is a well-known species, which has been the originator to many cultivars. The various cultivars can differ from one another in height, but all have solitary, bowl shaped flowers that are 5 in wide (12 cm), with a slender and sometimes striped leaves. Its cultivar 'Juan' has gained the Royal Horticultural Society's Award of Garden Merit. It has red-orange flowers with yellow centres and variegated leaves. Tulip 'Zombie' is another 'fosteriana' cultivar with large flowers and glaucous-blue leaves. Another known cultivar is 'Red Emperor'.

== Other sources ==
- Aldén, B., S. Ryman, & M. Hjertson. 2012. Svensk Kulturväxtdatabas, SKUD (Swedish Cultivated and Utility Plants Database; online resource) URL: www.skud.info
- Christenhusz, J. M.. et al. 2013. Tiptoe through the tulips - cultural history, molecular phylogenetics and classification of Tulipa (Liliaceae). Bot. J. Linn. Soc. 172:280-328.
- Czerepanov, S. K. 1995. Vascular plants of Russia and adjacent states (the former USSR) Cambridge University Press.
- Groth, D. 2005. pers. comm. Note: re. Brazilian common names
- Huxley, A., ed. 1992. The new Royal Horticultural Society dictionary of gardening Note: lists as Tulipa fosteriana Hoog ex W. Irv.
- Komarov, V. L. et al., eds. 1934-1964. Flora SSSR.
- Marasek, A. & K. Okazaki. 2008. Analysis of introgression of the Tulipa fosteriana genome into Tulipa gesneriana using GISH and FISH. Euphytica 160:217-230. Note: Netherlands journal of plant breeding
- Marasek-Ciolakowska, A. et al. 2012. Breeding and cytogenetics in the genus Tulipa. Floriculture, Ornamental and plant biotechnology: Advances and topical issues. Volumes I-V. Global Science Books., London. 6(Special issue):90-97.
- Mathew, B. F. 1996. pers. comm. Note: re. common names
- Raamsdonk, L. W. D. van & T. de Vries. 1995. Species relationships and taxonomy in Tulipa subg. Tulipa (Liliaceae). Pl. Syst. Evol. 195:40.
- Rechinger, K. H., ed. 1963-. Flora iranica.
- Walters, S. M. et al., eds. 1986-2000. European garden flora.
