= Iron Gates Natural Park =

Natural park in southwestern Romania

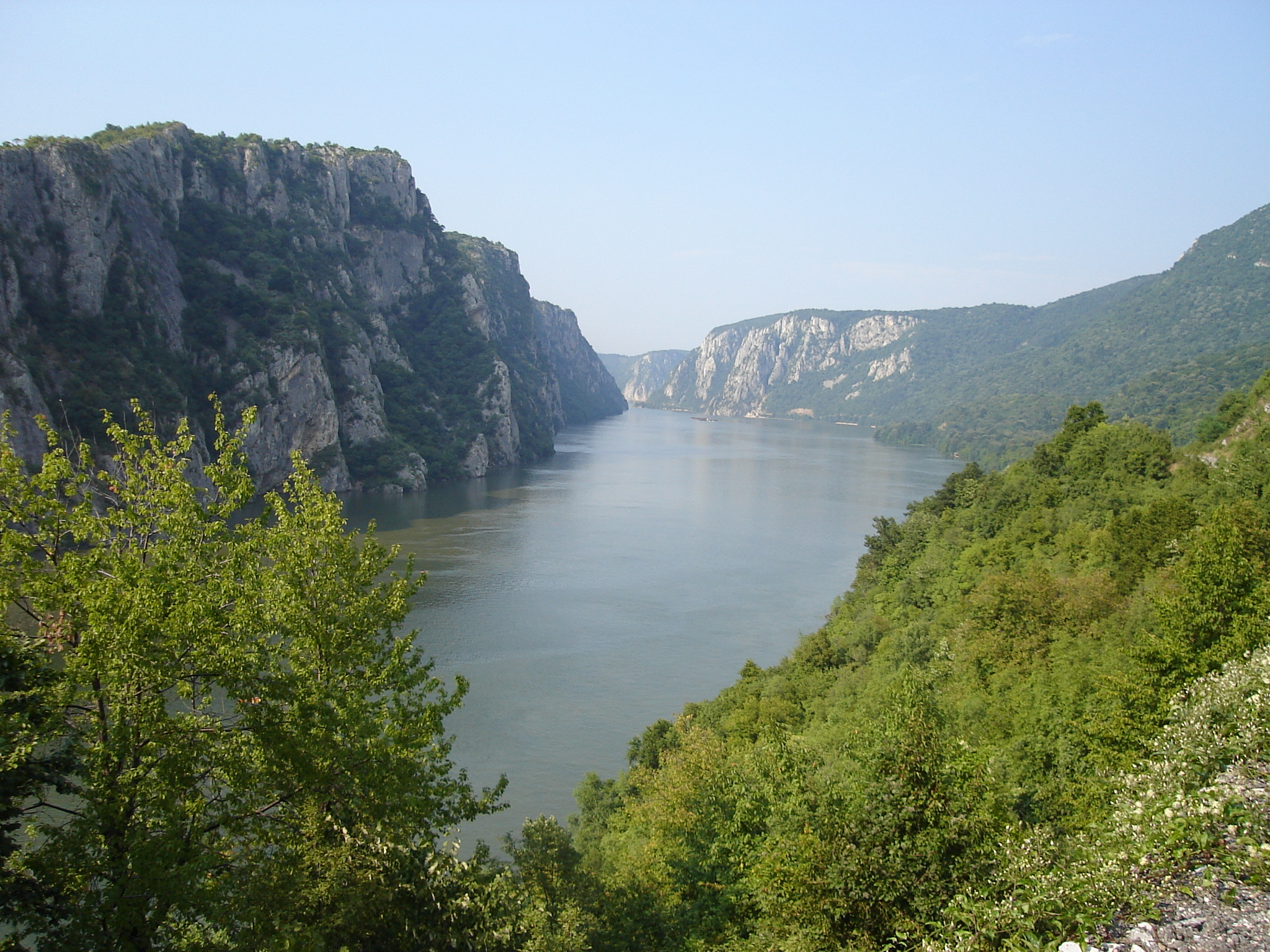

- Location within Romania
- Location: Southwestern Romania
- Coordinates: 44.638°N 22.106°E
- Area: 115,666 hectares (285,820 acres)
- Website: www.portiledefier.ro

Ramsar Wetland
- Designated: 5 March 2009
- Reference no.: 1946

The Iron Gates Natural Park (Romanian: Parcul Natural Porțile de Fier) is a 115,666-hectare (285,820-acre) natural park located in southwestern Romania. It includes the Romanian part of the Iron Gate of the Danube River, and stretches along the left bank of the river in the counties of Caraș-Severin and Mehedinți. Across the river is Đerdap National Park in Serbia.

The Iron Gates Natural Park is the second largest natural park in Romania. It stretches from Socol in the west, to Drobeta-Turnu Severin in the east; to the north are the Banat Mountains and the Mehedinți Mountains. The park contains 18 protected areas, the largest one being the wet zone Ostrov–Moldova Veche.

The Iron Gates Natural Park is home to 205 species of birds and 34 species of mammals.

It also home to several plants which are protected by law, including Tulipa hungarica, Banat's corn (Cerastium banaticum), Cosaci (Astragalus rochelianus), Cazane bells (Campanula crassipes), Wild carnation (Dianthus kitaibelli) and Rock iris (Iris reichenbachii).
