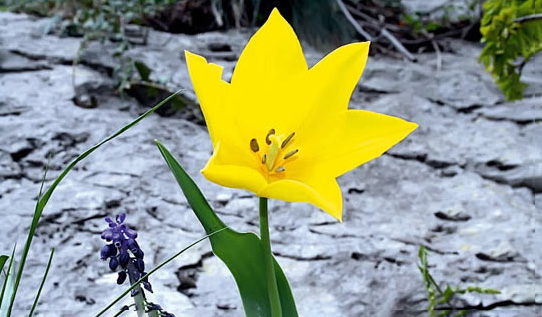

Conservation status
- Near Threatened (IUCN 3.1)

Scientific classification
- Kingdom: Plantae
- Clade: Embryophytes
- Clade: Tracheophytes
- Clade: Spermatophytes
- Clade: Angiosperms
- Clade: Monocots
- Order: Liliales
- Family: Liliaceae
- Subfamily: Lilioideae
- Genus: Tulipa
- Species: T. hungarica

Binomial name
- Tulipa hungarica Borbás

Synonyms
- Tulipa aureolina Delip.; Tulipa hungarica var. undulatifolia Roman; Tulipa hungarica subsp. undulatifolia (Roman) Roman & Beldie; Tulipa hungarica var. urumoffii (Hayek) Hayek; Tulipa orientalis Levier; Tulipa orientalis var. urumoffii (Hayek) Stoj. & Stef.; Tulipa urumoffii Hayek

= Tulipa hungarica =

Species of flowering plant

Tulipa hungarica, the Hungarian tulip, Danube tulip, Banat tulip or Rhodope tulip, is a species of flowering plant in the family Liliaceae. It is also in the subgenus Tulipa. It is found on the rocky mountainsides of Bulgaria, Romania, Hungary and Slovenia, especially along the gorges of the river Danube. It has small bright yellow flowers in spring and blue-grey leaves.

== Description ==
Tulipa hungarica is a perennial plant, with a small, ovoid shaped bulb that has brown papery skin (tunicate) and sessile bulbils (growing off main bulb). Meaning that it vegetatively increases from the original plants.

It has large glaucous (blue-grey coloured) leaves, which are elliptic-lanceolate or linear-lanceolate shaped. They can be up to 30–37 cm (1 ft 0 in – 1 ft 3 in) long and 5.7–7.8 cm (2.2 in – 3.1 in) wide.

It has a hairless stem and the plant can grow up to 40–60 cm (1 ft 4 in – 2 ft 0 in) tall.

It blooms in spring, between March, or April, to May.

The small flowers, are odourless, and yellow. The petals do not have a basal blotch.

It has 3 inner and 3 outer flower petals, which slightly overlap, they are between 5–10 cm (2.0 in – 3.9 in) long, and 22–35 mm (0.87 in – 1.38 in) wide. The outer petals are up to three times as long as wide, ending in a little point, like a 6 pointed star.

It has stamens with yellow, or golden yellow anthers, which are 10–16 mm long. It has an elongated ovary, with a stigma that is approx. twice as long and broader than the ovary.

After the tulip has flowered it produces a seed capsule or fruit, which is elongated or elliptical and 70 mm long, and is inclined on both endpoints. Inside the capsule, it has numerous flat brown seeds.

=== Genetics ===
As most tulips are diploid, having two sets of chromosomes. This can be used to identify hybrids and used in the classification of groupings. Such as Raamsdonk, L. W. D. van & T. de Vries. 1995. Species relationships and taxonomy in Tulipa subg. Tulipa (Liliaceae). Tulipa hungarica has a chromosome count: 2n=2x=24. Its somatic (cellular) DNA 2C value (2C) was calculated in 2008 to be 64.7–66. Tulipa rhodopaea was 67.6–70.

== Taxonomy ==
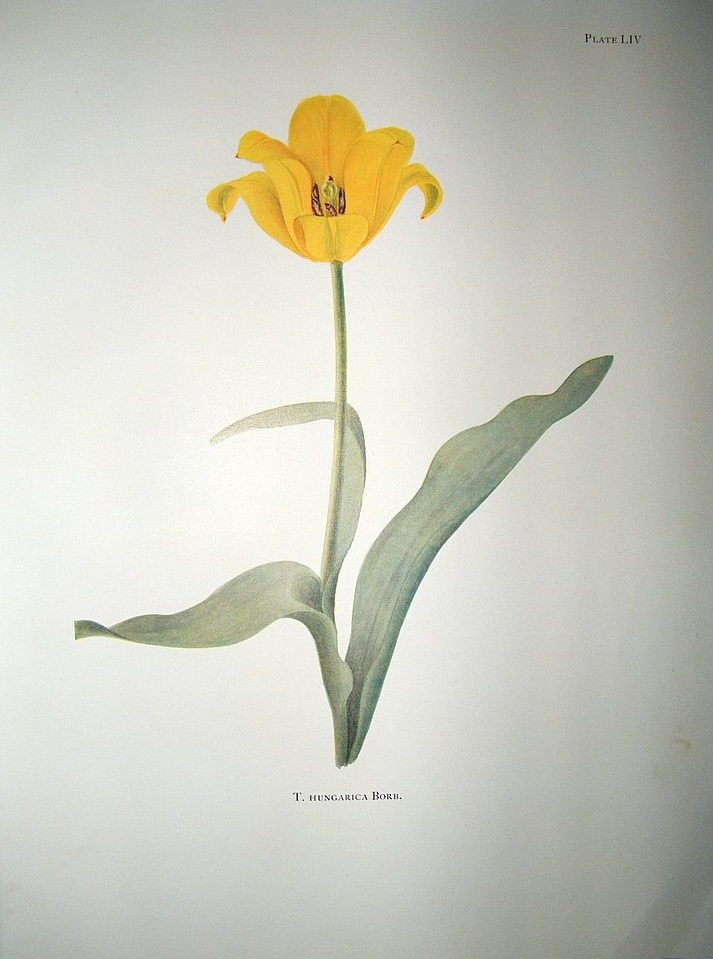
Image of Tulipa hungarica from William Rickatson Dykes book from 1930

Tulipa hungarica has had various common names. It was used to be called the Danube tulip. It is also called the 'Đerdap tulip' (after the Serbian name of 'Đerdap Gorge' for the Iron Gates Gorge on the river Danube). It is also called the 'yellow tulip', or the 'Boiler tulip' in Moldova Nouă, Romania. It is also known as the Banat tulip in Romania. As the historical region of Banat is on the Romanian/Hungry border, it is also very occasionally known as the 'Hungarian tulip'.

The specific epithet hungarica refers to the country of Hungary. It was named from plant material collected in what was then the Austro-Hungarian Empire, but is now part of Romania.

Tulipa hungarica was originally described and published by Vincze von Borbás (1844–1905), a Hungarian botanist, in Foldmuv. Erdek. Vol.10 on page 561 in 1882. It was the first tulip to be described from the Balkan region.

It was also published in 'Studies on species Tulipa hungarica Borb. in Romania' by (Rum) Coste I; Faur. A. Ocrotirea Natur. 14 (2) 203–208.

It was verified by United States Department of Agriculture and the Agricultural Research Service on 12 April 1996, and is an accepted name by the Royal Horticultural Society in the UK.

In 2013, the phylogenetic relationships in the genus using DNA sequences was used to determine the taxonomy and classifications. As result T. hungarica was placed in 'Tulipa subgenus Tulipa' (along with Tulipa agenensis Redouté, Tulipa fosteriana W.Irving and Tulipa greigii Regel) with the characteristics of; bulb tunics densely lined inside with rippled or silky hairs or (nearly) glabrous. Stamens without hairs orboss. Stigmas sessile.

It also has a common name of Rhodope tulip, as one of its synonyms is Tulipa rhodopea (Velen.) Velen. Although this name is accepted as a separate species by some sources. When treated as a species, it has the synonyms (Tulipa aureolina Delip., Tulipa hungarica subsp. rhodopea (Velen.) Raamsd. and Tulipa orientalis var. rhodopea Velen.). The epithet 'Rhodope' refers to the Rhodope Mountains in Bulgaria, where it is mainly found.

== Distribution and habitat ==
It is native to south-eastern Europe.

=== Range ===
Tulipa hungarica is found in part of the Balkans region, within Bulgaria, Romania, (including in the Western Romanian Carpathians) Montenegro, Hungary, and Slovenia.

Two sources mentions that it is native to Greece, and that it was only introduced into Romania, but many other sources state that it is endemic, or native to Romania.

It was an endemic in Serbia, but it is now classed as extinct.

== Habitat ==
Tulipa hungarica grows on limestone soils, in open mixed deciduous forests and below shrubs. As an example, it is found on the rocky sides of the gorge on the river Danube, especially through the Iron Gates gorge between Romania and Serbia, also known as the Djerdap gorge. It also grows alongside the Danube gorge through Hungary.

== Conservation ==
It was on the 'List of Rare, Threatened, and Endemic Plants' in Europe in 1977. It has been an internationally protected species since 1979. The species is protected by law (OG 57/2007) and also the Berne Convention. It is also listed in the EU's, Habitats Directive 92/43 EEC under annex II and under annex IV.

Whilst tulips generally do not appear on the IUCN Red List, in 2021 only five out of around 88 species have specific reports, two of the six species from the Balkans are represented. Tulipa hungarica was reported as 'Near Threatened', whilst Tulipa albanica was documented as 'Critically Endangered'.

Tulipa hungarica is classed as 'Near Threatened' approaching Criterion D1 as there are estimated (in 2021) to be slightly more than 1,000 mature individuals in a small range. It has not been determined if the population is in decline, the rate of decline or the area of occupancy.

In Romania, it is also protected under the EU's Natura 2000 network. It is listed as 'high priority' with other plants such as Centaurea jankae, Potentilla emilii-popii, Centaurea pontica, Dracocephalum austriacum, Ferula sadleriana, Gladiolus palustris, Stipa danubialis, Thlaspi jankae, Paeonia officinalis subsp. banatica, Colchicum arenarium, Saxifraga hirculus and Ligularia sibirica. As it is now protected by international laws, and those who are caught breaking them risk fines of up to 15,000 lei (Romanian leu or Moldovan leu).

In 2014, of the 548 taxa listed in the 'Red Book of vascular plants of Romania' (from a total of 3,795 species and subspecies in the Romanian flora), Tulipa hungarica was now listed as CR (Critically Endangered).

Part of the tulip's habitat is in the protected Iron Gates Natural Park territory (on the SW Romania and Slovenia border,), which is about 270 km away from the town of Timișoara. It is also known as the 'Porțile de Fier Natural Park', and Tulipa hungarica is the emblem of this protected natural area.

It was once fairly stable population at up to 250 plants, but the rare plant has multiplied, from one year to another. There were over 1,000 mature individuals on the southern slopes of Iron Gate. As the insolation and exposure of the slopes in the park, make the climate pleasant and the soils are favourable for this plant. It was found that in recent years, it has expanded its area, the number of wild tulips have exceeding 8,000 specimens.

As the biologists from the Iron Gates nature reserve are closely monitoring it, which is done from the Serbian shore, so that they can use specialised equipment on boats to watch the population, to identify any threats or pressure on this species. Amalia Dumbravă, a biologist from the Iron Gates Natural Park, noted in 2021, "we have identified an approximate number of 8–9,000 plants".

In Romania, all localities of the tulip habitats are situated above the zone of flooding. However, the species might still be threatened by collecting for local gardening. Also, every spring there are hundreds of tourists to the park eager to admire its beauty in the rocky wilderness. The tulips are protected by a steep wall 15 to 20 meters high. So most tourists are content to admire them from the boat on the river Danube, and they also enjoy the telling of the legend that tells the story of these unique flowers.

It has been determined that this species of tulip has become extinct across large areas of its natural range on the Balkan peninsula.

Such as in Serbia, T. hungarica was rare on the north face side of the Iron Gate gorge but it has not been recorded in last ten years. Only herbarium specimens are proofs of occurrence of the species.

It was also found that flooding had caused the extinction of the species in Serbia. Of the 15 plant species that were recorded which are part of the "Red Book of Flora of Serbia 1", three taxa have disappeared from the area of Đerdap national park (the other side of the Iron Gates gorge), (Veronica bachofenii, Crocus banaticus and Tulipa hungarica). These 3 species have been lost, due to the flooding of their habitats in the process of building a hydroelectric power station (the Iron Gate I Hydroelectric Power Station in 1972, unfortunately before the plant protection schemes started) which formed a water reservoir.

It had also become extinct in Slovenia, after another reservoir was formed.

== Cultivation ==
It is a rare plant in European gardens, but can grow in full sun in fertile soil with good drainage. They could be ideal for use in rock gardens and in forest environments.

It can be affected by the parasite Vankya heufleri, in the flowers, leaves and roots.

== Culture ==
A 1615 painting by the Dutch artist Jacob de Gheyn II, Vase of Flowers with a Curtain, has several tulips including a hybrid Tulip hungarica crossed with Tulipa agenensis.

A painting by Zoltan Molnar called Meadow Flowers Indigenous to Hungary features Tulipa hungarica as well as others including Syringa josikaea and Verbascum thapsiforme.

An image of the Rhodope Tulip (or Tulipa rhodopea, a syn. of T. hungarica) was used in a Flower series of postage stamps by Bulgaria in 1960.

According to an old tale; about a local Romanian girl who fell in love with a shepherd who was grazing his sheep up on the Ciucarul Mare plateau in the Banat Mountains. The parents of the girl, did not agree with their relationship. So she had to secretly agree to meet him on the plateau, but she inadvertently slipped and fell into the Danube river. She was dressed in yellow, then as she rolled down the mountainside and the rocks tore pieces of her dress. Where the rags landed, grew a flower - a yellow tulip. That is why the tulip is found on all the terraces, along the Danube riverside.

== Other sources ==
- Tutin, T. G. et al., eds. 1964–1980. Flora europaea
