= Vincze von Borbás =

Hungarian botanist

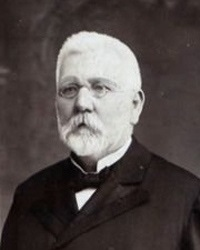
Borbás Vince

Vincze von Borbás (28 July 1844 – 7 July 1905) was a Hungarian botanist. He was born in Ipolylitke, Hungary, and died in Kolozsvár (now Cluj-Napoca, Romania).

Borbás named numerous plant species, most of which are taxonomic synonyms of currently accepted names.

== Life ==
von Borbás was born into a poor family, so he started his studies at the grammar school in Eger only at the age of sixteen. He was greatly influenced by the gardener of the archbishop of Eger, Márton Vrabély a prominent Mátra researcher. He was admitted to the University of Pest in 1868, where in 1871 he became a teaching assistant in botany of Lajos Jurányi. From 1872 to 1902 he worked as a teacher at the main school in Budapest. He was inaugurated as a doctor of natures in 1874, in 1880 as a private university teacher, and in 1898 as an honorary extraordinary teacher. He worked for Alexander Braun in Berlin and Anton Kerner von Marilaun in Innsbruck both of which had a major impact on his taxonomic and phytogeographical work.

Anton Kerner von Marilaun recruited him to collect specimens for his exsiccata work Flora exsiccata Austro-Hungarica. He conducted numerous research trips in Hungary and beyond. From 1902 until his death, he was a leader professor of plant taxonomy at the University of Cluj-Napoca and then director of the Botanical Garden.

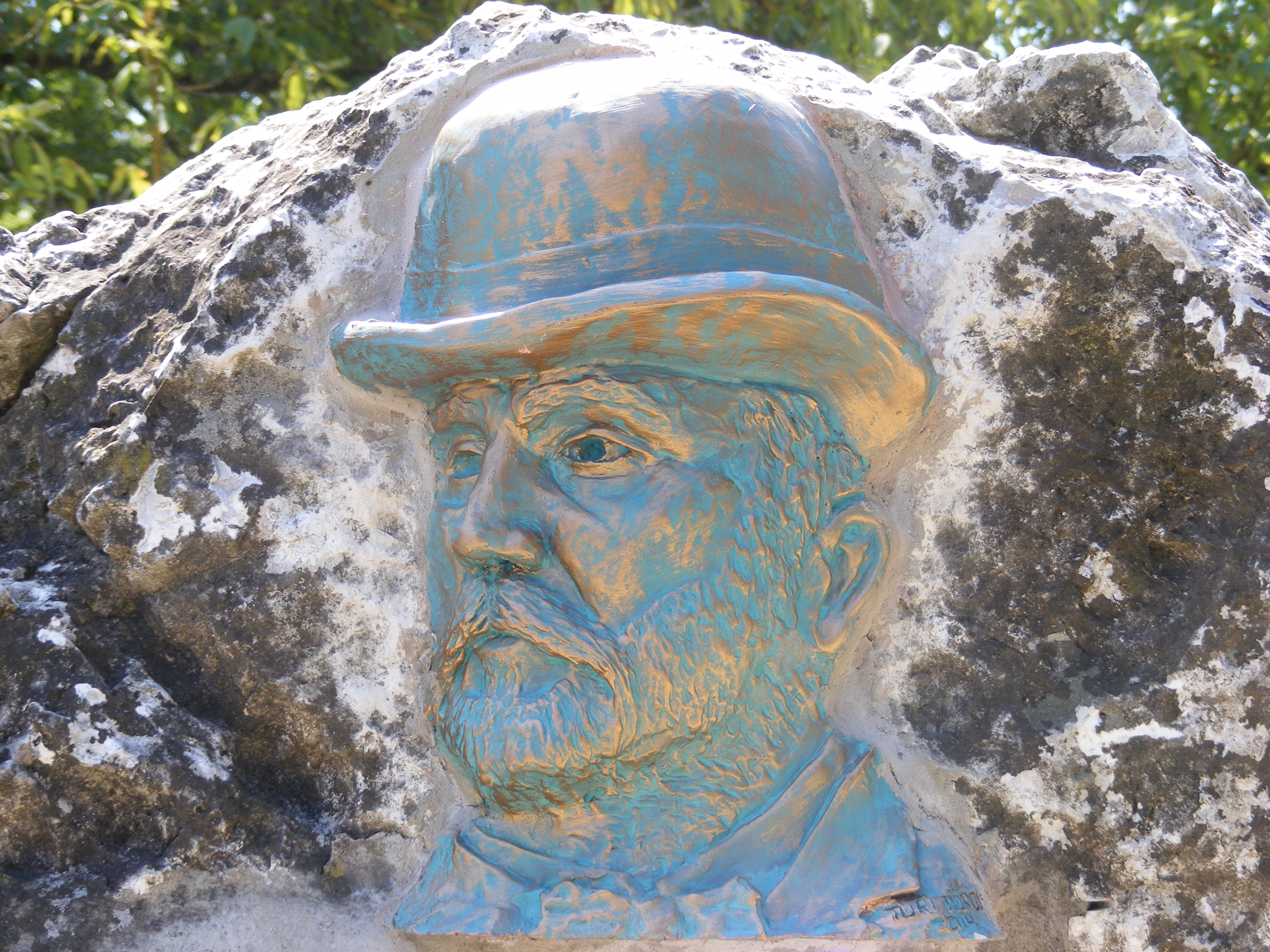
Borbás Vince statue at Keszthely, Hungary

von Borbàs was a prolific researcher. Between 1870 and 1905, he published 874 papers. He described and named about 2,000 new plant forms, a significant portion of which are still valid today. For example, in 1882 he described the rare Hungarian tulip Tulipa hungarica and the Linum dolomiticum (hungarian name: Pilisi len) which lives exclusively in Hungary as a relict species.

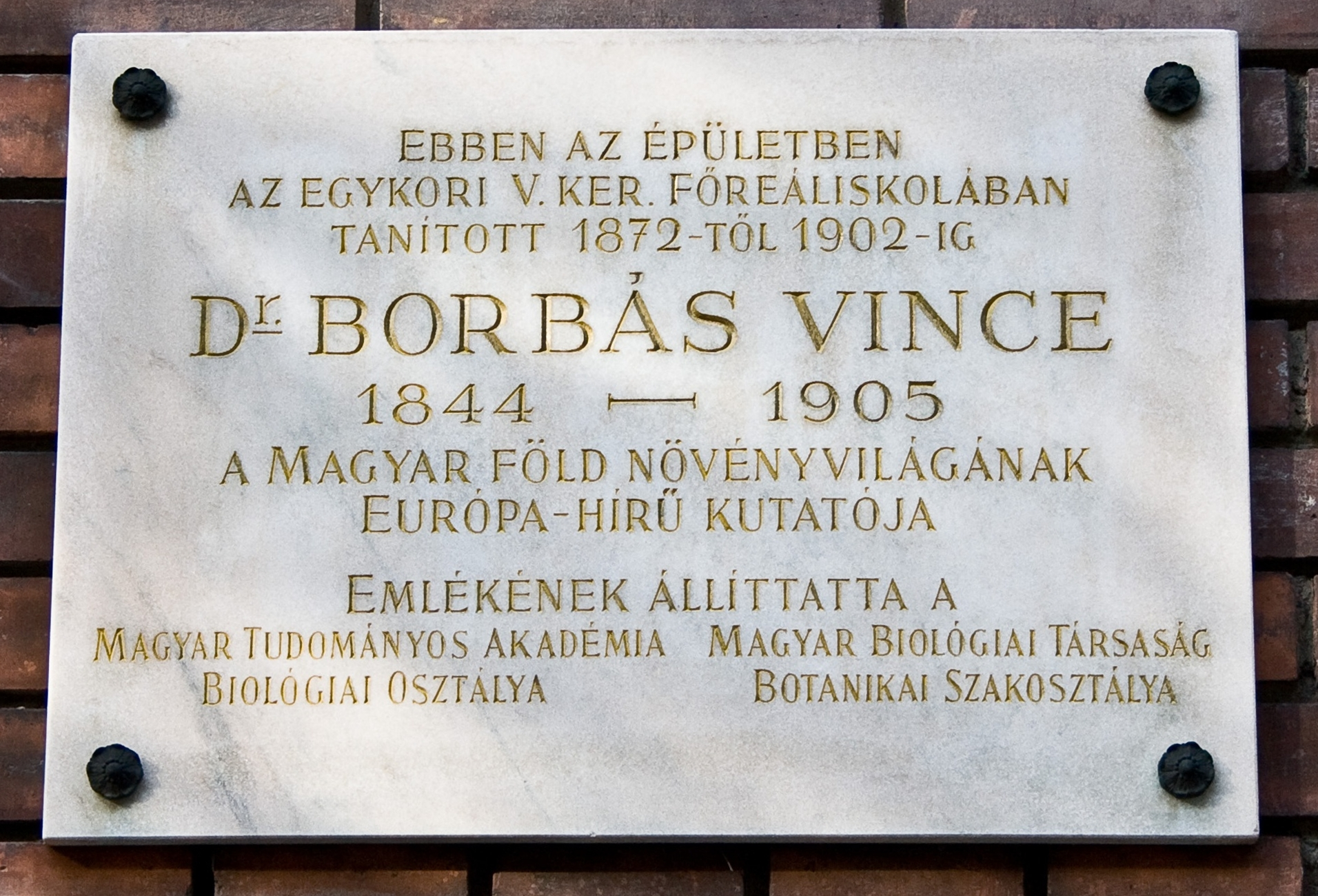
A plaque in commemoration of Borbás in Budapest.

His high professional standard is also shown by the fact that he recognized that the closest relative of the newly found plant species was a flax species in Greece, Linum elegans. In addition to many plant species, his admirers named the journal Borbásia after him. He used modern genealogical ideas in his taxonomic work. The largest of these is the rose monograph. It provided new ideas for understanding the origin of species, the development of plant communities, and solving other related issues. As a versatile, far-sighted, original, intuitive scientist, he was the best acquaintance of the Hungarian flora for forty years.

== Influence ==
A number of plant species have been named in honor of von Borbás, including:

- (Fabaceae) Lotus borbasii Ujhelyi
- (Caprifoliaceae) Lonicera borbasiana (Kuntze) Degen
- (Rubiaceae) Asperula borbasiana (Korica) Korica
- (Lamiaceae) Mentha × borbasiana Briq.

[ synon. = Mentha × dalmatica Tausch ]

- (Hypericaceae) Hypericum borbasii Formánek

[ synon. = Hypericum tetrapterum Fr. ]

== Major works ==
- Pestmegye flórája… (Pest, 1872);
- Jelentés a Bánság területén végzett növénytani kutatásokról (Bp., 1874);
- Adatok a sárga virágú szegfüvek és rokonaik systematicai ismeretéhez (Bp., 1876) Mathematikai és természettudományi közlemények 13. évf. 1. sz./1876 187-216 o.;
- Adatok Arbe és Veglia szigetek nyári flórája közelebbi ismeretéhez (Bp., 1877) Mathematikai és természettudományi közlemények 14. évf. 7. sz./1877 365-436 o.;
- Vizsgálatok a hazai Arabisek és egyéb Cruciferák közül (Bp., 1878);
- Floristikai közlemények… (Bp., 1878);
- Floristicai adatok (Roripák)… (Bp., 1879);
- A hazai Epilobiumok ismeretéhez (Bp., 1879);
- Budapest és környékének növényzete (Bp., 1879);
- A magyar birodalom vadon termő rózsái monográfiájának kísérlete (Bp., 1880);
- Az elzöldült szarkaláb, mint morphologiai útmutató (Bp., 1881);
- Békés vármegye flórája (Bp., 1881);
- Az Aquilegiák rendszere és földrajzi elterjedése (Bp., 1882);
- Temesmegye vegetációja (Temesvár, 1884);
- A magyar homokpuszták növényvilága mag a homokkötés (Bp., 1886);
- Vasvármegye növényföldrajza és flórája (Szombathely, 1888);
- Közép-Európa, különösen Magyarország kakukfüveinek ismertetése (Bp., 1890);
- A szerbtövis hazája és vándorlása (Bp., 1893) Mathematikai és természettudományi közlemények 25. kötet/1894 485-580 o.;
- A Balaton tavának és partmellékének növényföldrajza és edényes növényzete (Bp., 1900);
- Revisio Knautiarum (Kolozsvár, 1905).

== Sources ==
- Media related to Vince Borbás at Wikimedia Commons
- Robert Zander; Fritz Encke; Günther Buchheim; Siegmund Seybold, eds. (1984). Handbook of Plant Names, 13th Edition. Stuttgart: Ulmer Verlag. ISBN 3-8001-5042-5.
- "Vince von Borbás article" (in Hungarian). Magyar életrajzi lexikon.
- "Vince von Borbás life" (in Hungarian). Hungarian National Archives. 23 July 2019.
- "Vince von Borbás life" (in Hungarian). Arcanum - Hungarian Biographical Lexicon.
