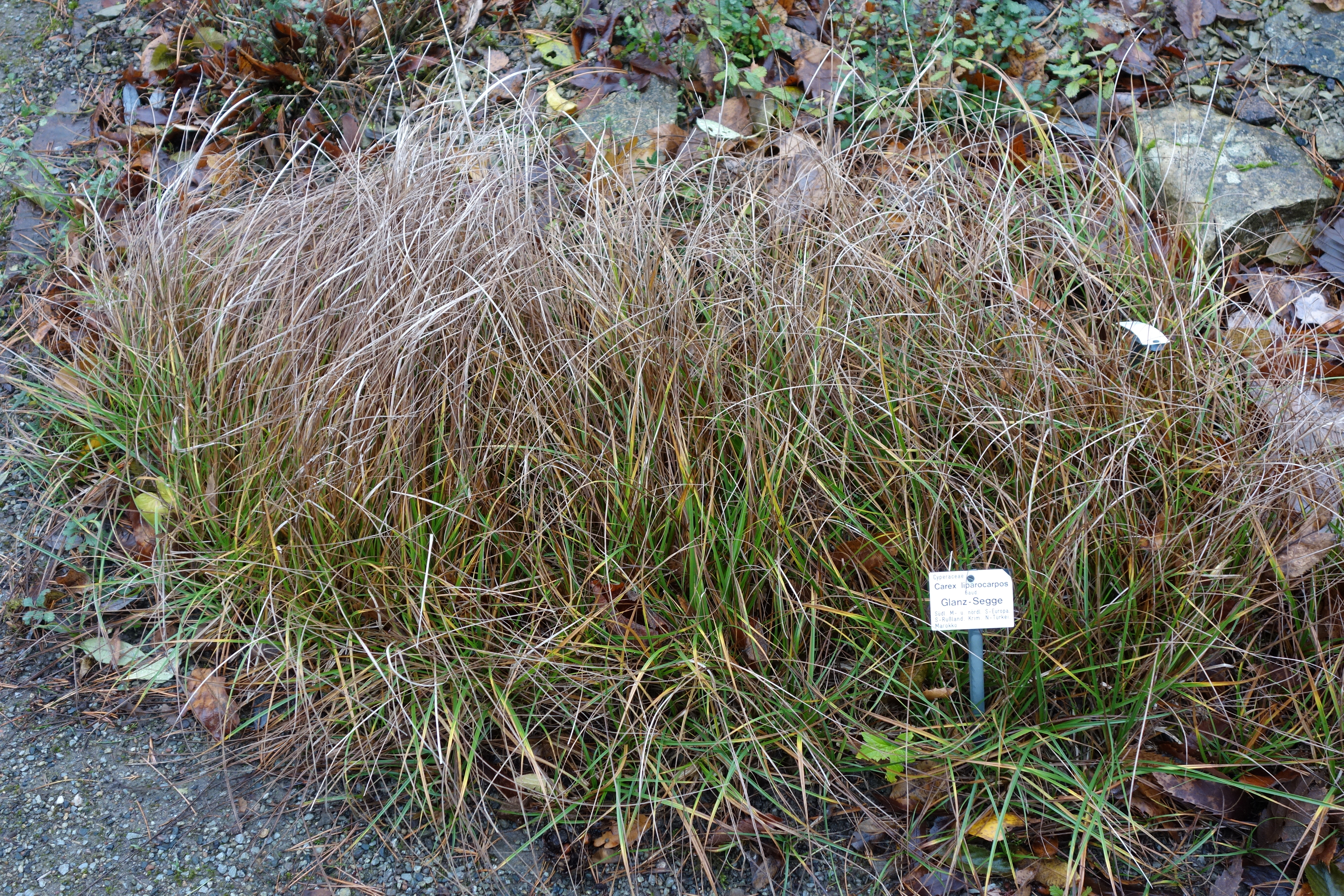
- In the Dresden Botanical Garden

Scientific classification
- Kingdom: Plantae
- Clade: Tracheophytes
- Clade: Angiosperms
- Clade: Monocots
- Clade: Commelinids
- Order: Poales
- Family: Cyperaceae
- Genus: Carex
- Species: C. liparocarpos

Binomial name
- Carex liparocarpos Gaudin

Synonyms
- List: Carex bordzilowskii V.I.Krecz.; Carex brevirostrata Poir.; Carex lamarckii Wood; Carex lucida Clairv.; Carex nitida Host; Carex palentina Losa & P.Monts.; Carex schkuhrii Willd.; Edritria schkuhrii (Willd.) Raf.; Lamprochlaenia nitida Fedde & J.Schust.

= Carex liparocarpos =

Species of grass-like plant

Carex liparocarpos is a species of sedge (genus Carex), native to southern Europe, and the Atlas and Caucasus regions. It is typically found growing in sandy steppes, dunes, riverine gravel deposits, and scree.

== Subtaxa ==
The following subspecies are currently accepted:

- Carex liparocarpos subsp. bordzilowskii (V.I.Krecz.) T.V.Egorova
- Carex liparocarpos subsp. liparocarpos
