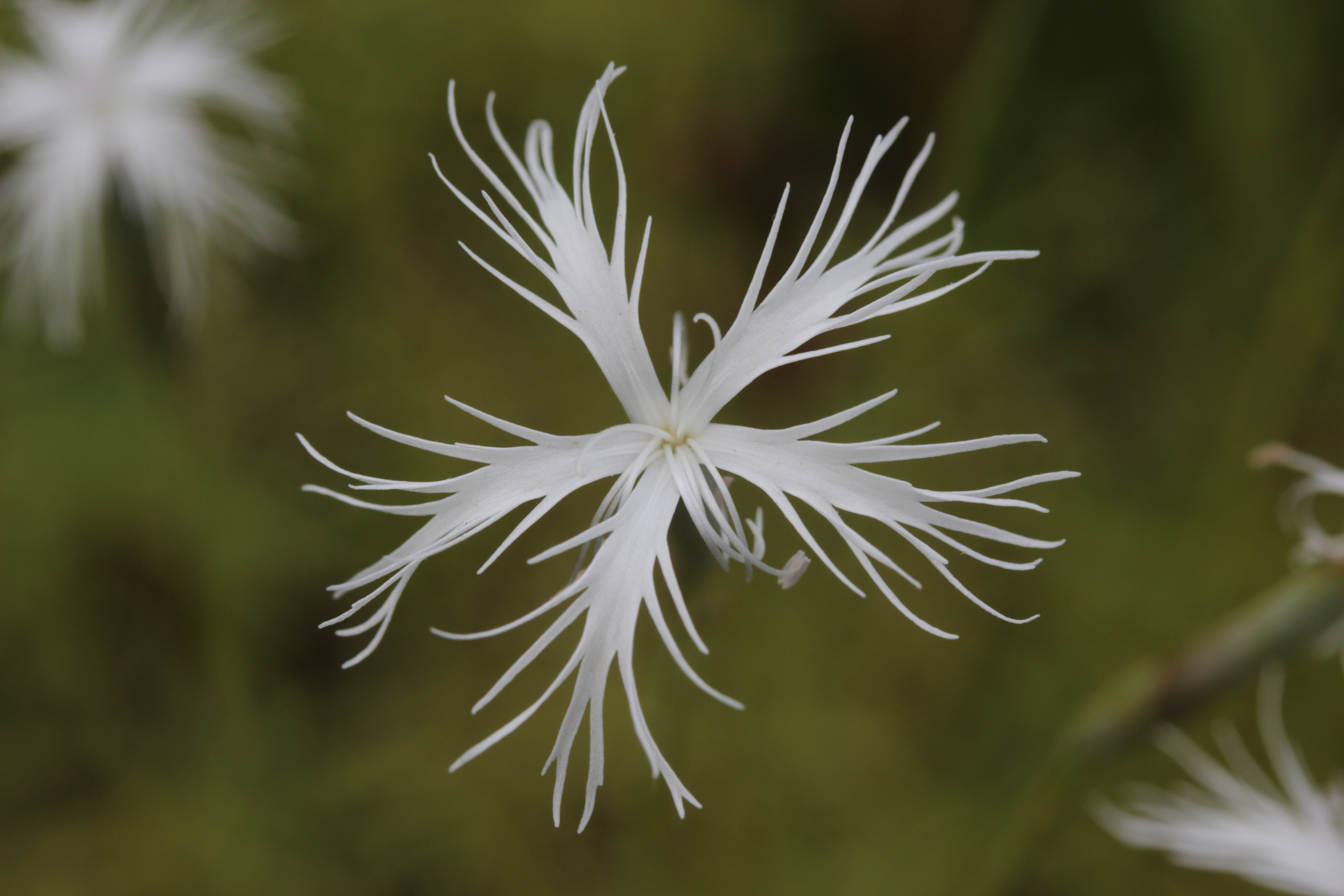

Scientific classification
- Kingdom: Plantae
- Clade: Tracheophytes
- Clade: Angiosperms
- Clade: Eudicots
- Order: Caryophyllales
- Family: Caryophyllaceae
- Genus: Dianthus
- Species: D. petraeus

Binomial name
- Dianthus petraeus Waldst. & Kit.

Synonyms
- List: Dianthus bebius Vis. ex Rchb.; Dianthus bohemicus Mayer ex Tausch; Dianthus integripetalus Schur; Dianthus kitaibelii Janka ex Beck; Dianthus liliodorus Pancic; Dianthus pseudocaesius Schur; Dianthus skorpilii Velen.

= Dianthus petraeus =

Species of flowering plant

Dianthus petraeus, the rock pink or fragrant snowflake garden pink, is a species of Dianthus native to Romania, the former Yugoslavia, Albania, and Bulgaria. It is often found growing on calcareous rocky slopes, or in dry highland forest edges. It is occasionally grown in rock gardens.

== Subspecies ==
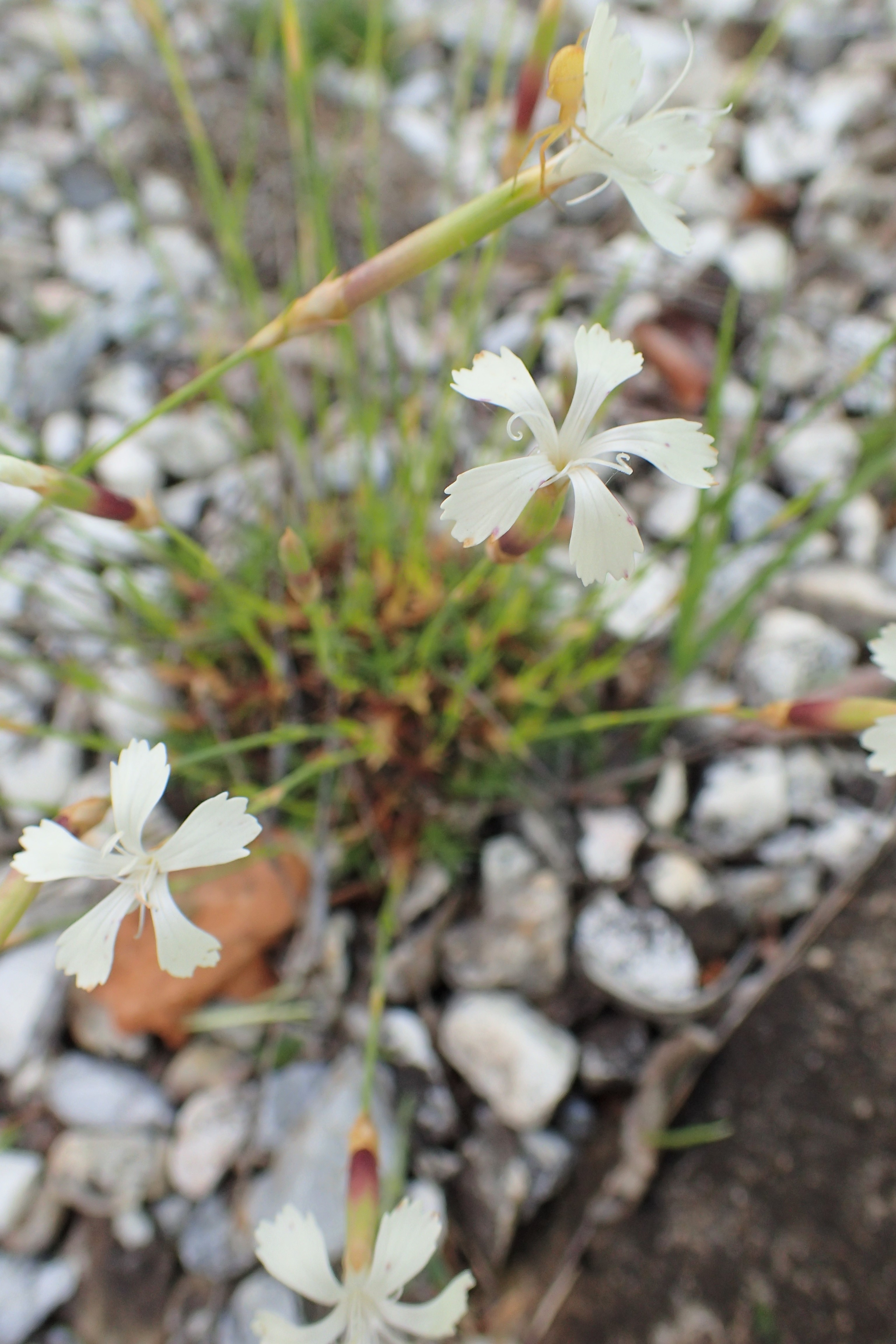
D. p. subsp. orbelicus

Only one subspecies is presently considered valid:

- Dianthus petraeus subsp. orbelicus (Velen.) Greuter & Burdet
