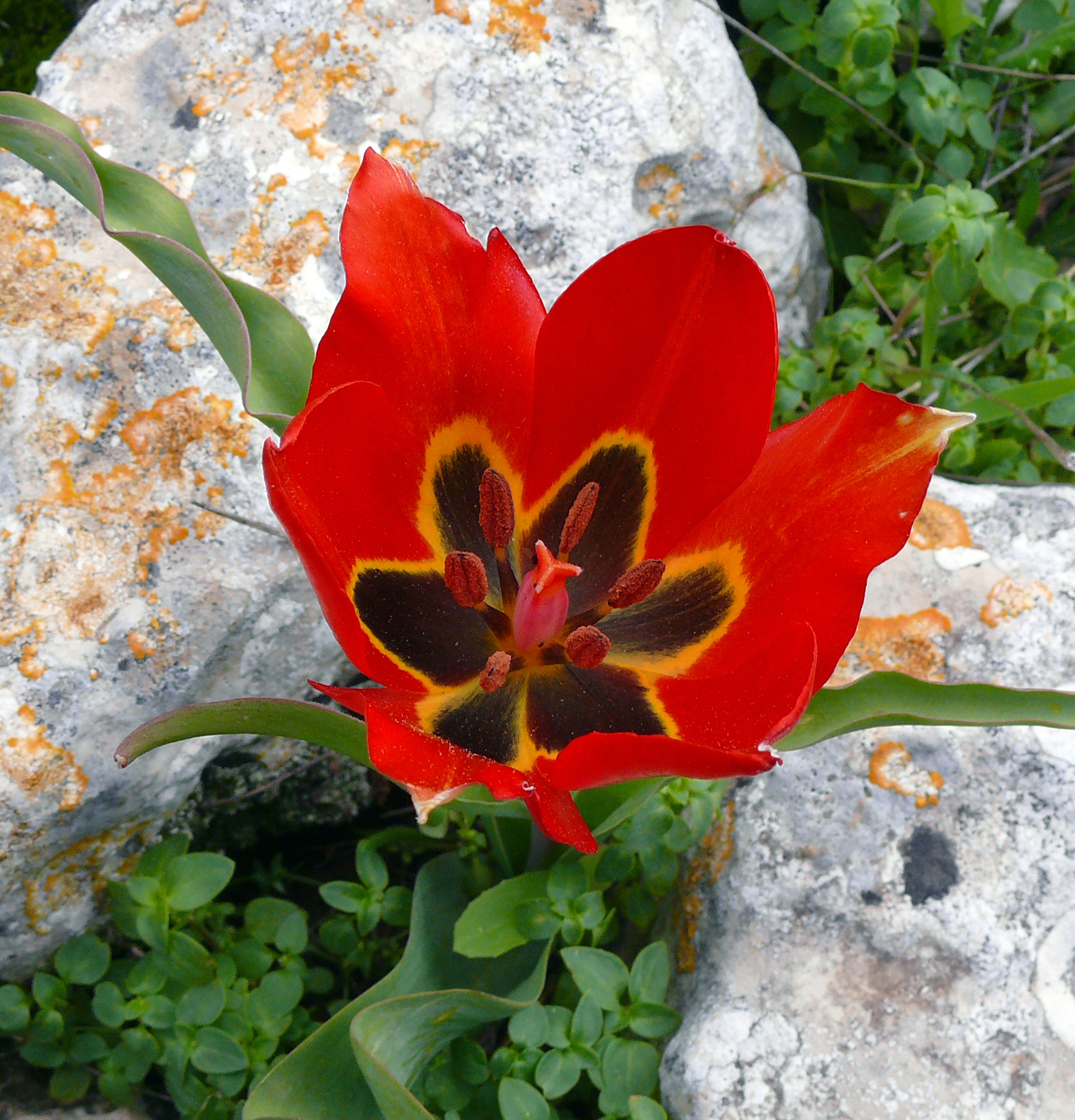
- Tulip agenensis in Israel

Scientific classification
- Kingdom: Plantae
- Clade: Tracheophytes
- Clade: Angiosperms
- Clade: Monocots
- Order: Liliales
- Family: Liliaceae
- Subfamily: Lilioideae
- Tribe: Lilieae
- Genus: Tulipa
- Subgenus: Tulipa subg. Tulipa
- Species: T. agenensis

Binomial name
- Tulipa agenensis Redouté

Synonyms
- Synonymy: Tulipa oculus-solis DC.; Tulipa acuminata Vahl ex Hornem.; Tulipa raddii Reboul; Tulipa maleolens Reboul; Tulipa apula Guss. ex Ten.; Tulipa foxiana Reboul; Tulipa lortetii Jord.; Tulipa boissieri Regel; Tulipa hexagonata Borbás; Tulipa martelliana Levier; Tulipa libanotica Regel; Tulipa dammanii Regel; Tulipa aximensis E.P.Perrier & Songeon; Tulipa sharonensis Dinsm.; Tulipa veneris A.D.Hall; plus several more names at the level of variety or subspecies

= Tulipa agenensis =

Species of flowering plant

Tulipa agenensis is a species of flowering plant in the family Liliaceae. It is native to Turkey, Iran, Cyprus, the Aegean Islands, Syria, Lebanon, Israel, Palestine, and Jordan, and is naturalized in the central and western Mediterranean (Italy, Tunisia, France, Portugal, Moldova, etc.).

Tulipa agenensis is a bulb-forming perennial. The flowers are brick red or deep red with black and yellow markings toward the center with a green stem. The petals are oval, tapered with curled tips and it has green and lanceolate foliage.

== Taxonomy ==
In Italy, it was commonly known as the 'Red Tulip of Bologne'.

The specific epithet agenensis, refers to the French town of Agen, where a wild colony of the tulips were found.

T. agenensis was originally described and published by Pierre-Joseph Redouté in his painted series 'Les Liliacées' Vol.1 in February 1804.

== Culture ==
A painting by the Dutch artist Jacob de Gheyn II, 'Vase of Flowers with a Curtain' in 1615, has several tulips including a hybrid Tulipa hungarica crossed with Tulipa agenensis. While Osias Beert I painting Flowers in a glass vase in a niche (undated but c.1606), also has several tulips including the Red tulip, Tulipa agenensis.

== Gallery ==
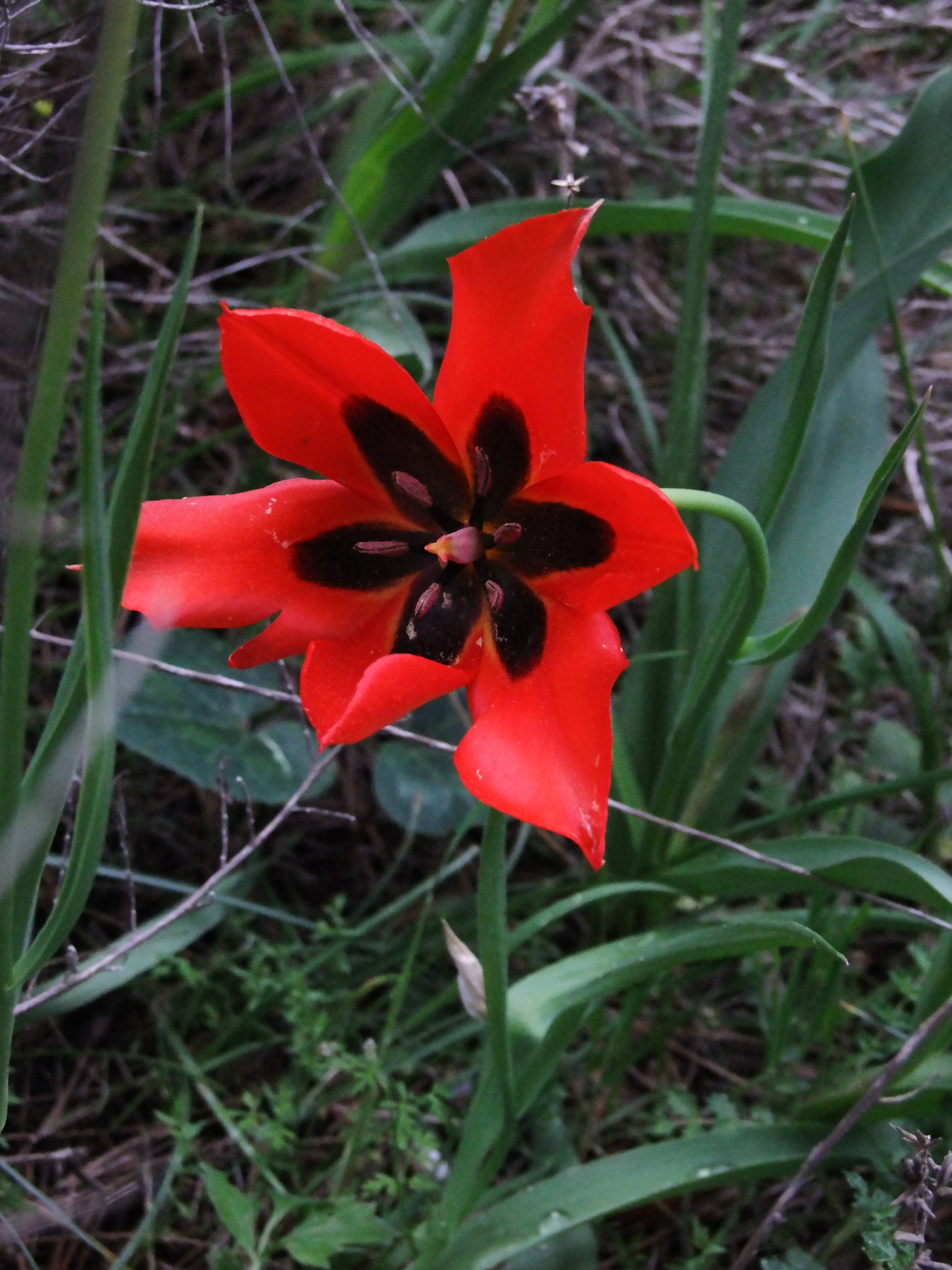

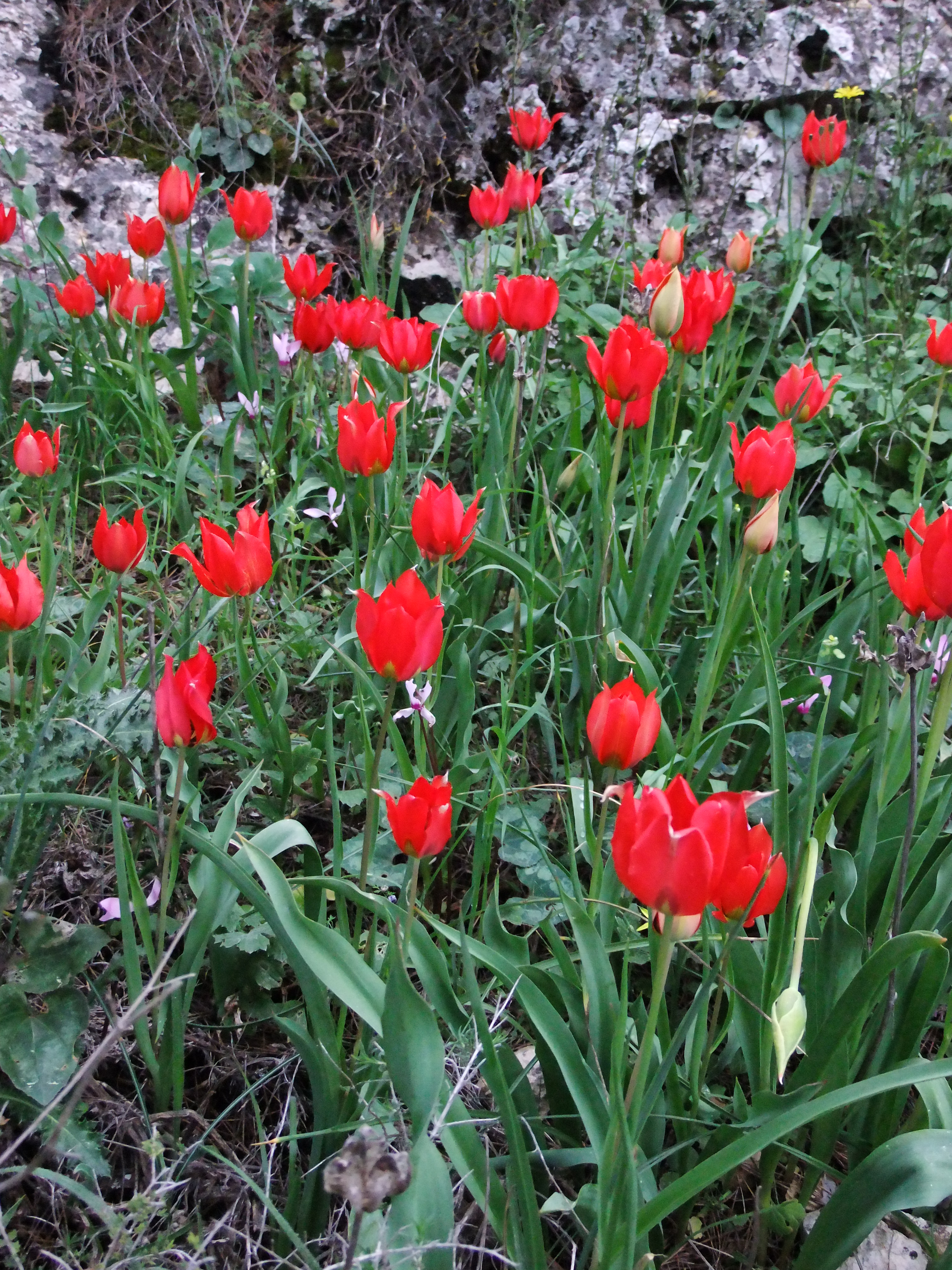

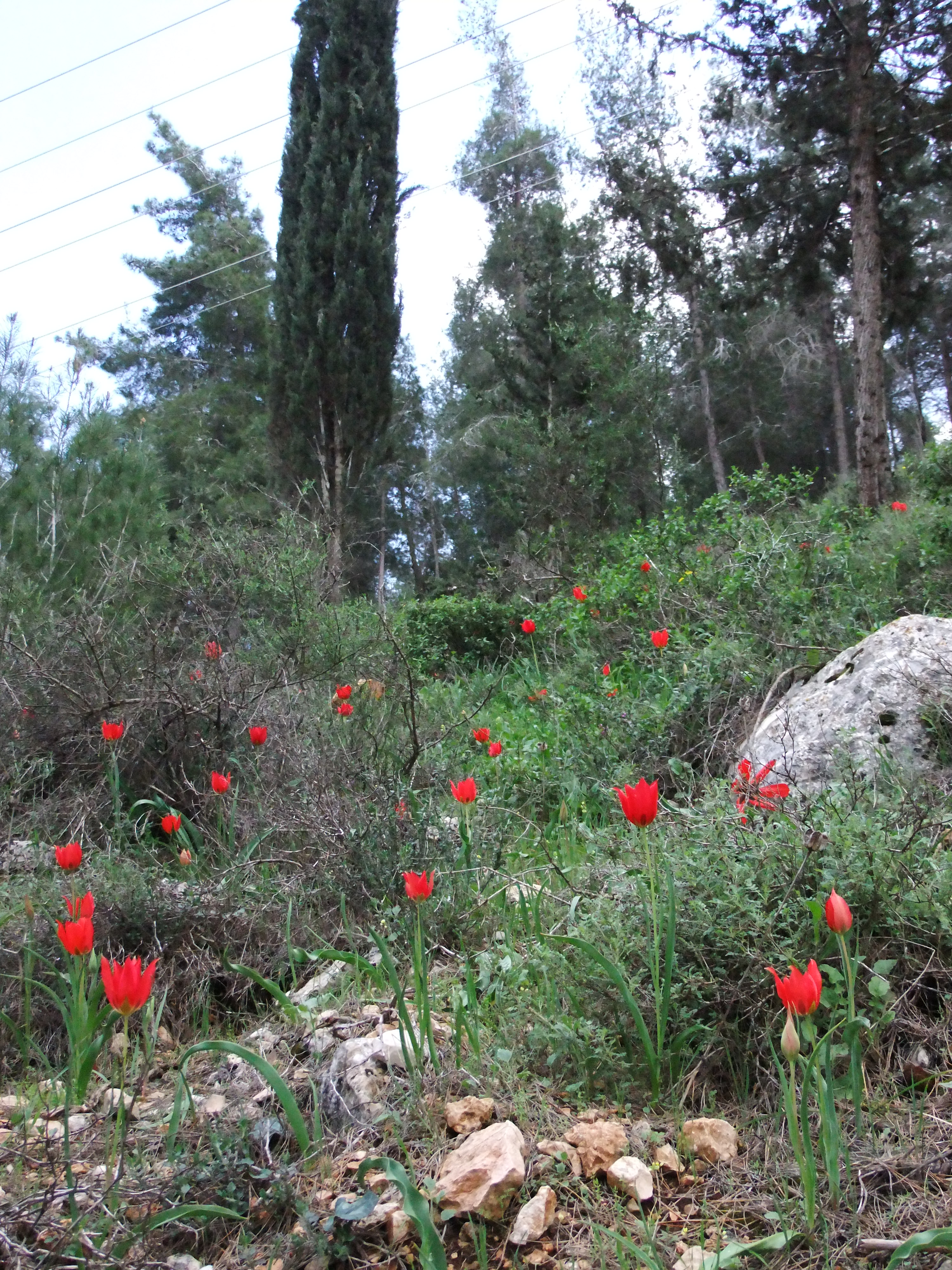

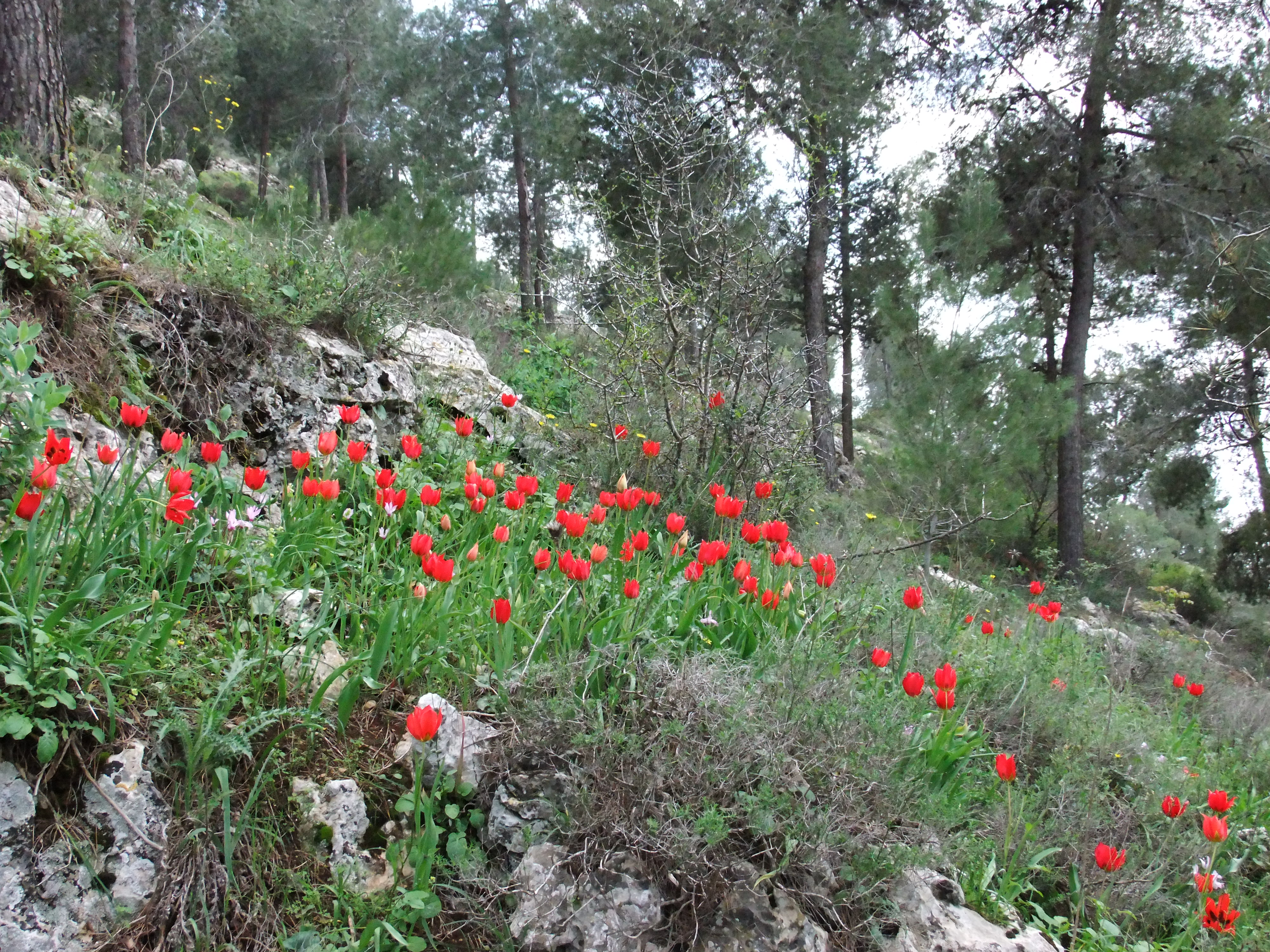

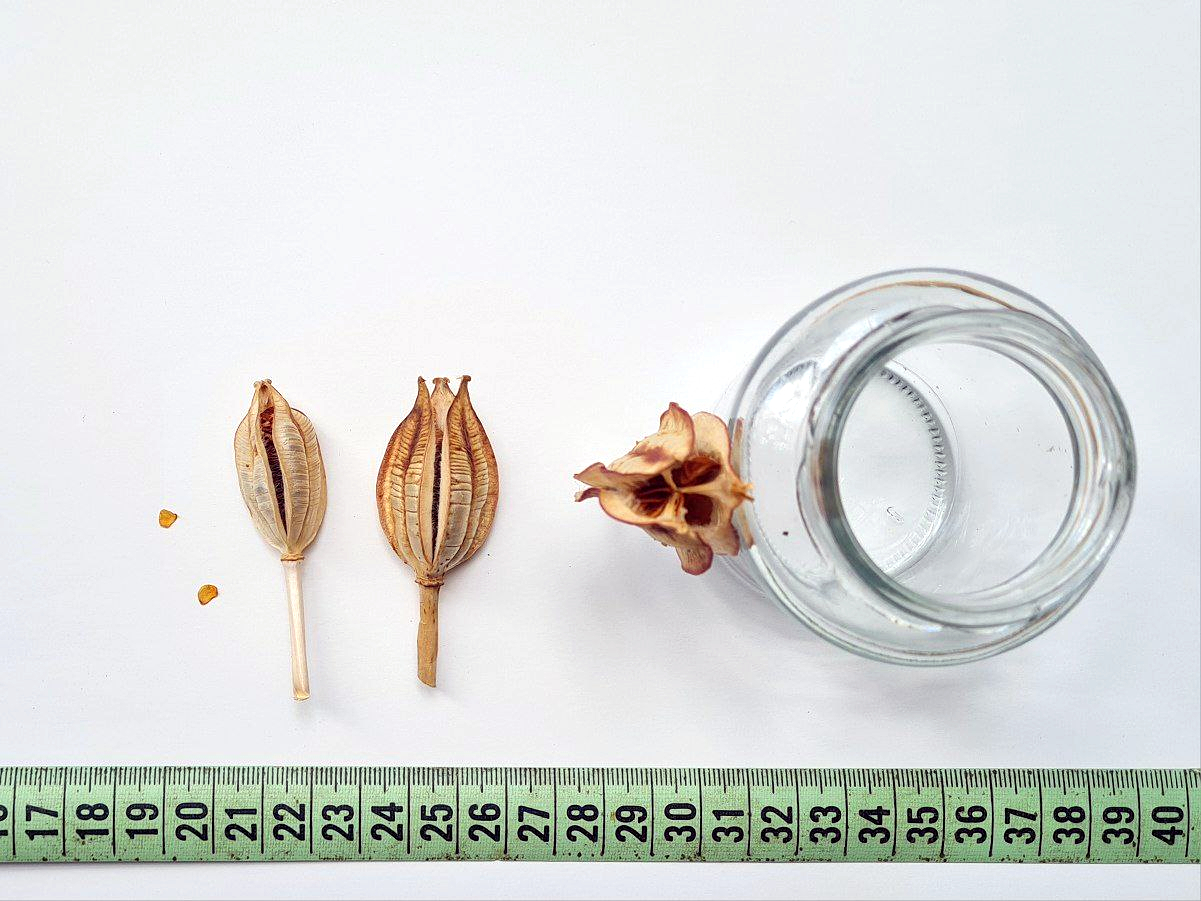
Fruits and seeds of Tulipa agenensis
