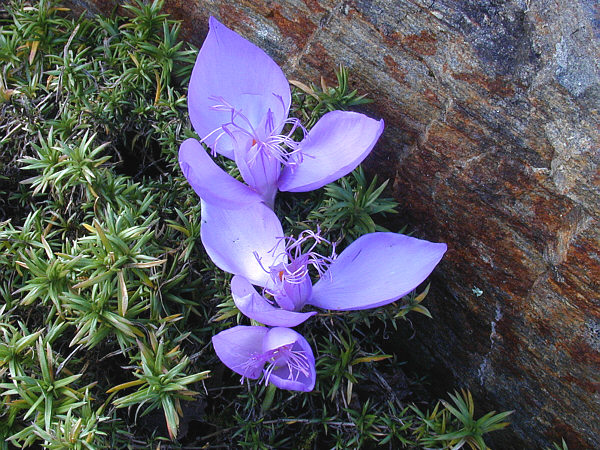

Scientific classification
- Kingdom: Plantae
- Clade: Tracheophytes
- Clade: Angiosperms
- Clade: Monocots
- Order: Asparagales
- Family: Iridaceae
- Genus: Crocus
- Subgenus: Crocus subg. Crociris
- Species: C. banaticus

Binomial name
- Crocus banaticus J.Gay

Synonyms
- Crocus herbertianus Körn.; Crocus iridiflorus Heuff. ex Rchb.; Crocus nudiflorus Schult.

= Crocus banaticus =

Species of plant

Crocus banaticus, is a species of flowering plant in the family Iridaceae. It is native to the Balkans, particularly in Serbia, Romania and south western Ukraine. It creates its own subgenus in the Crocus subfamily known as Crociris. It is a cormous perennial growing to 10 cm (4 in).

Flowers, usually violet but also white, appear in autumn (fall). The small inner tepals are surrounded by three larger tepals, unlike the more symmetrical crocus species found outside of the subfamily. The flowers are followed by grass-like leaves, lacking the silver stripe normally associated with the genus.

Crocus banaticus has gained the Royal Horticultural Society's Award of Garden Merit.
