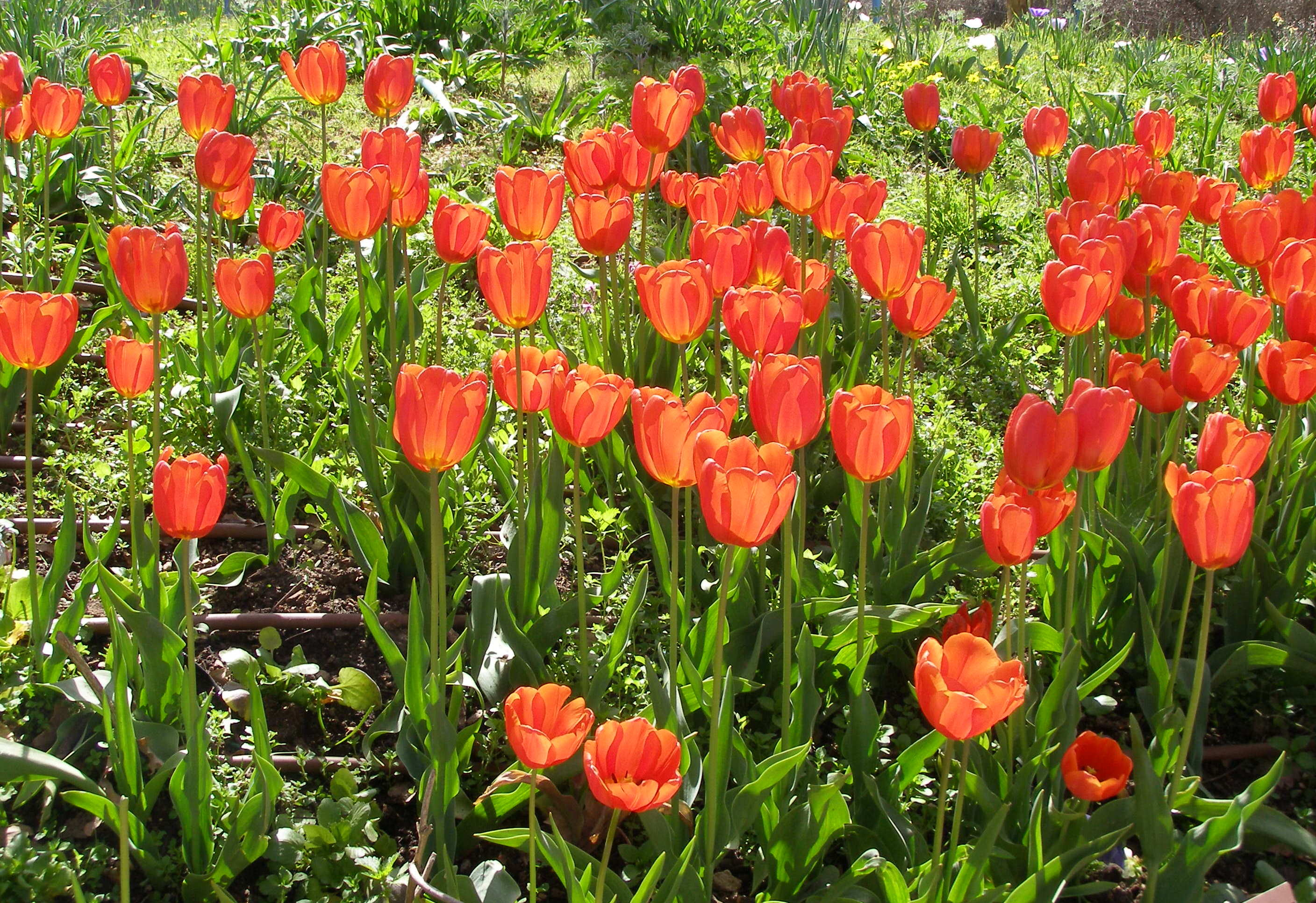

Scientific classification
- Kingdom: Plantae
- Clade: Tracheophytes
- Clade: Angiosperms
- Clade: Monocots
- Order: Liliales
- Family: Liliaceae
- Subfamily: Lilioideae
- Genus: Tulipa
- Subgenus: Tulipa subg. Tulipa
- Species: T. gesneriana

Binomial name
- Tulipa gesneriana L.

Synonyms
- Synonymy: Tulipa coronaria Salisb.; Tulipa hortensis Gaertn.; Tulipa stricta Stokes; Tulipa pubescens Willd.; Tulipa cornuta Redouté; Tulipa laciniata Fisch. ex Bellerm.; Tulipa campsopetala Delaun. ex Loisel.; Tulipa stenopetala Delaun. ex Loisel.; Tulipa bonarotiana Reboul; Tulipa strangulata Reboul; Tulipa media C.Agardh ex Schult. & Schult.f.; Tulipa repens Fisch. ex Sweet; Tulipa bicolor Raf.; Tulipa scabriscapa Fox-Strangw.; Tulipa unguiculata Raf.; Tulipa neglecta (Reboul) Reboul; Tulipa serotina Reboul; Tulipa variopicta Reboul; Tulipa spathulata Bertol.; Tulipa didieri Jord.; Tulipa fransoniana Parl.; Tulipa platystigma Jord.; Tulipa billietiana Jord.; Tulipa mauritiana Jord.; Tulipa planifolia Jord.; Tulipa mauriana Jord. & Fourr.; Tulipa acutiflora DC. ex Baker; Tulipa elegans Baker; Tulipa fulgens Baker; Tulipa retroflexa Baker; Tulipa mauriannensis Didier; Tulipa macrospeila Baker; Tulipa connivens Levier; Tulipa etrusca Levier; Tulipa lurida Levier; Tulipa passeriniana Levier; Tulipa sommieri Levier.; Tulipa baldaccii Mattei; Tulipa marjolletii E.P.Perrier & Songeon; Tulipa segusiana E.P.Perrier & Songeon; Tulipa saracenica E.P.Perrier; Tulipa perrieri Marj. ex P.Fourn.; Tulipa grengiolensis Thommen; Tulipa montisandrei J.Prudhomme; Tulipa rubidusa Lieser; Tulipa sedunii Lieser; Tulipa norvegica Lieser

= Tulipa gesneriana =

Species of plant

Tulipa gesneriana, the Didier's tulip or garden tulip, is a species of plant in the lily family, cultivated as an ornamental in many countries because of its large, showy flowers. This tall, late-blooming species has a single blooming flower and linear or broadly lanceolate leaves. This is a complex hybridized neo-species, and can also be called Tulipa × gesneriana. Most of the cultivars of tulip are derived from Tulipa gesneriana. It has become naturalised in parts of central and southern Europe and scattered locations in North America.

== Description ==
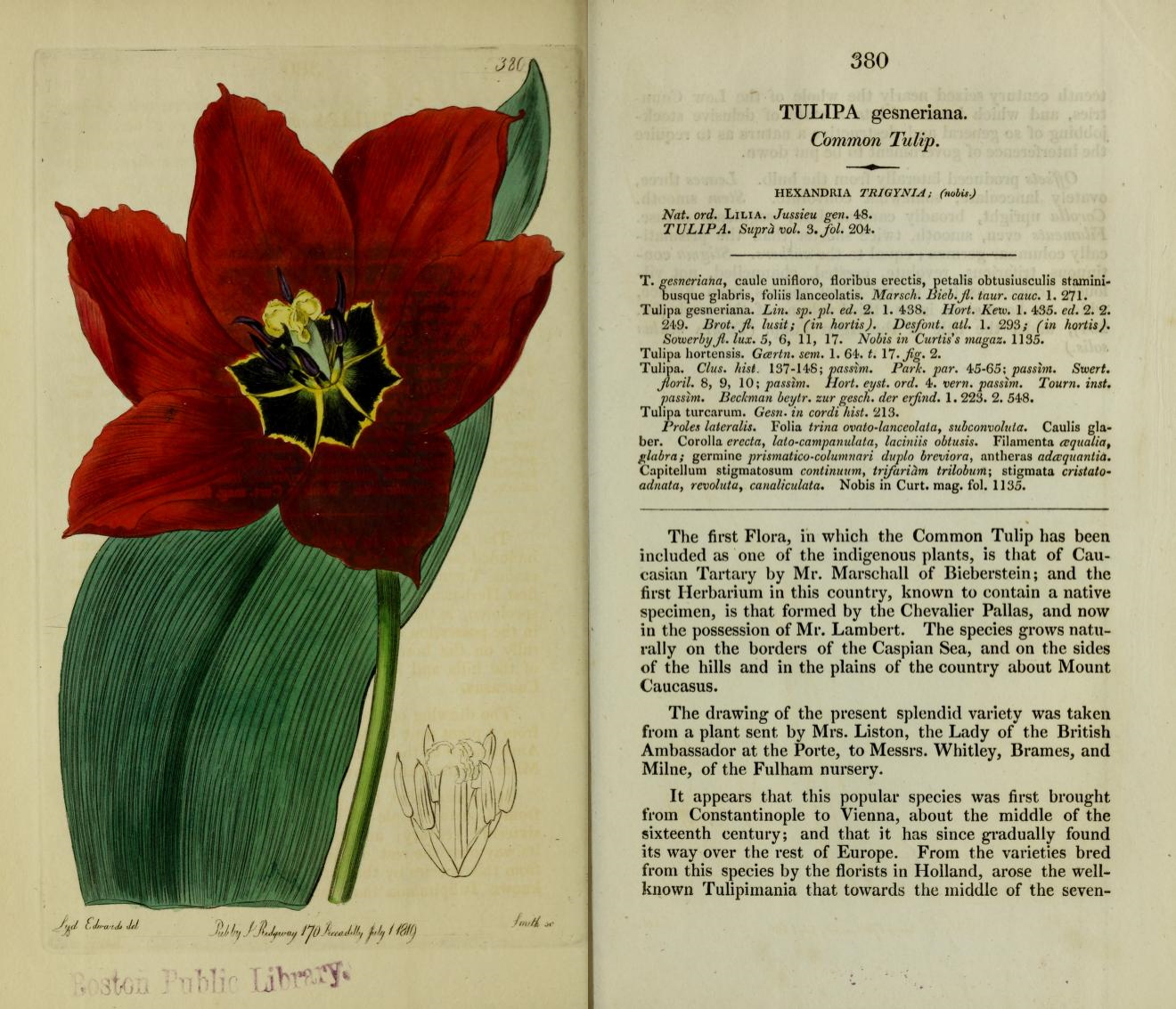
Illustration of Tulipa gesneriana

=== Vegetative characteristics ===
Tulipa gesneriana is a bulbous herb with ovate-lanceolate leaves. The bulb produces offsets laterally.

=== Generative characteristics ===
The erect, broadly campanulate flowers with glabrous, obtuse tepals have six stamens and three carpels.

== Taxonomy ==
It was published by Carl Linnaeus in 1753. It is the type species of its genus.

=== Etymology ===
The specific epithet gesneriana honours the Swiss botanist Conrad Gesner.

== Ecology ==
The flowers are pollinated by Halictus bees.

== History ==
This hybrid is widely believed to have originated in Tian Shan of Central Asia, from the collections of the sultan of the Ottoman Empire in Istanbul, as is the case with other species of tulips that came into Europe. In 1574, Sultan Selim II ordered the Kadi of A‘azāz in Syria to send him 50,000 tulip bulbs. However, Harvey points out several problems with this source, and there is also the possibility that tulips and hyacinth (sümbül), originally Indian spikenard (Nardostachys jatamansi) have been confused. Sultan Selim also imported 300,000 bulbs of Kefe Lale (also known as Cafe-Lale, from the medieval name Kaffa, probably Tulipa sauveolens, syn. Tulipa schrenkii) from the port of Kefe in Crimea, for his gardens in the Topkapı Sarayı in Istanbul. They are hybridized with other species present in the collections. Tulipa sauveolens is genetically very closely related to Tulipa gesneriana, and sometimes classified in the same species.

Tulipa gesneriana was introduced to western Europe from Constantinople in 1554. It was first described in 1559 by Conrad Gesner.

When the tulip originally arrived in Europe from the Ottoman Empire, its popularity soared and it quickly became a status symbol for the newly wealthy merchants of the Dutch Golden Age. As a mosaic virus began to infect bulbs, producing rare and spectacular effects in the bloom but weakening and destroying the already limited number of bulbs, a speculative frenzy now known as tulip mania was triggered between 1634 and 1637. Bulbs were exchanged for land, livestock, and houses, and the Dutch created futures markets where contracts to buy bulbs at the end of the season were bought and sold. A single bulb, the Semper Augustus, fetched 6,000 florins in Haarlem — at that time, a florin could purchase a bushel of wheat.

== Use ==
=== Food ===
The flower and bulb can cause dermatitis through the allergen, tuliposide A, even though the bulbs may be consumed with little ill effect. The bulbs may be dried and pulverised and added to cereals or flour.

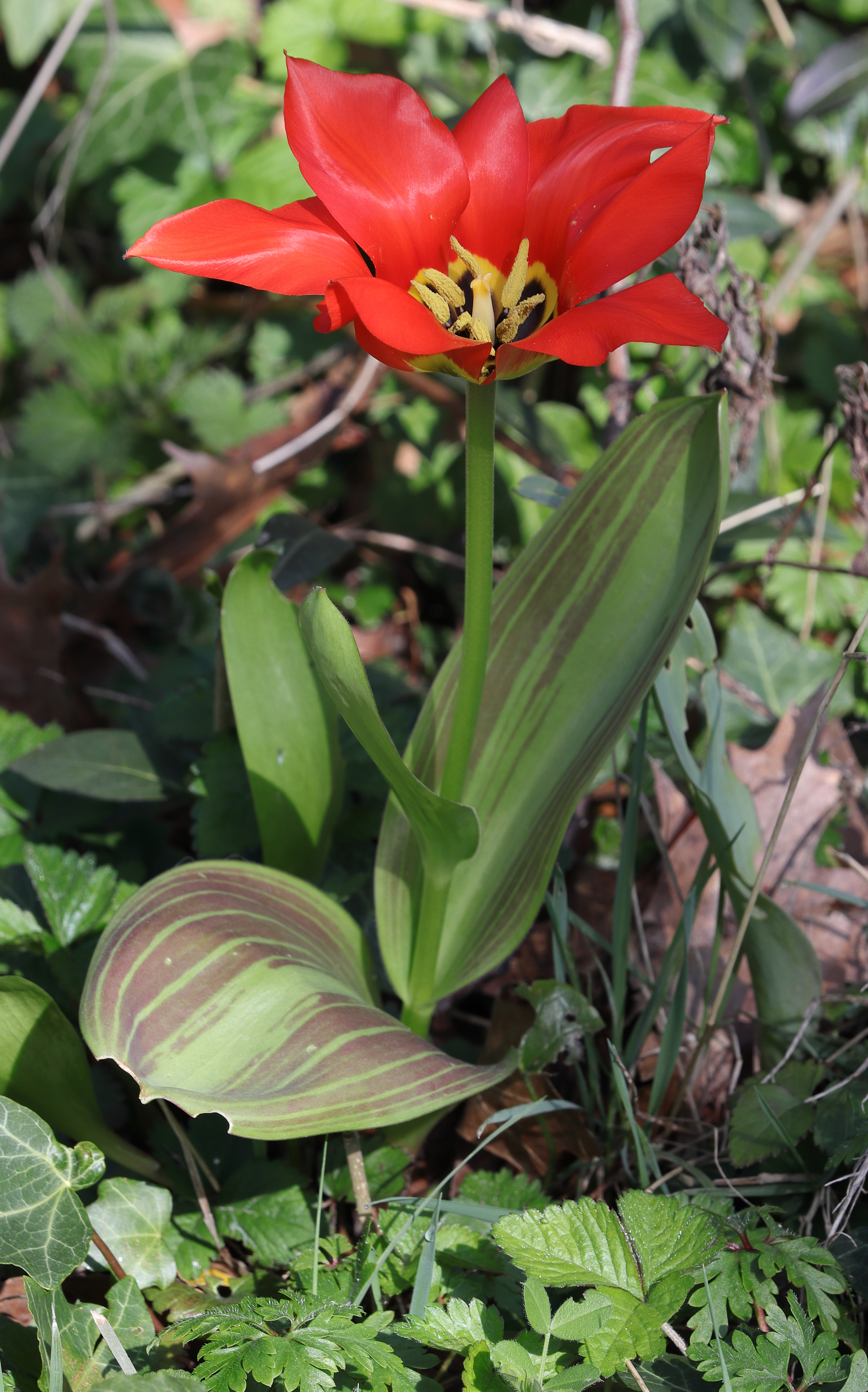
Tulip plant at the beginning of March

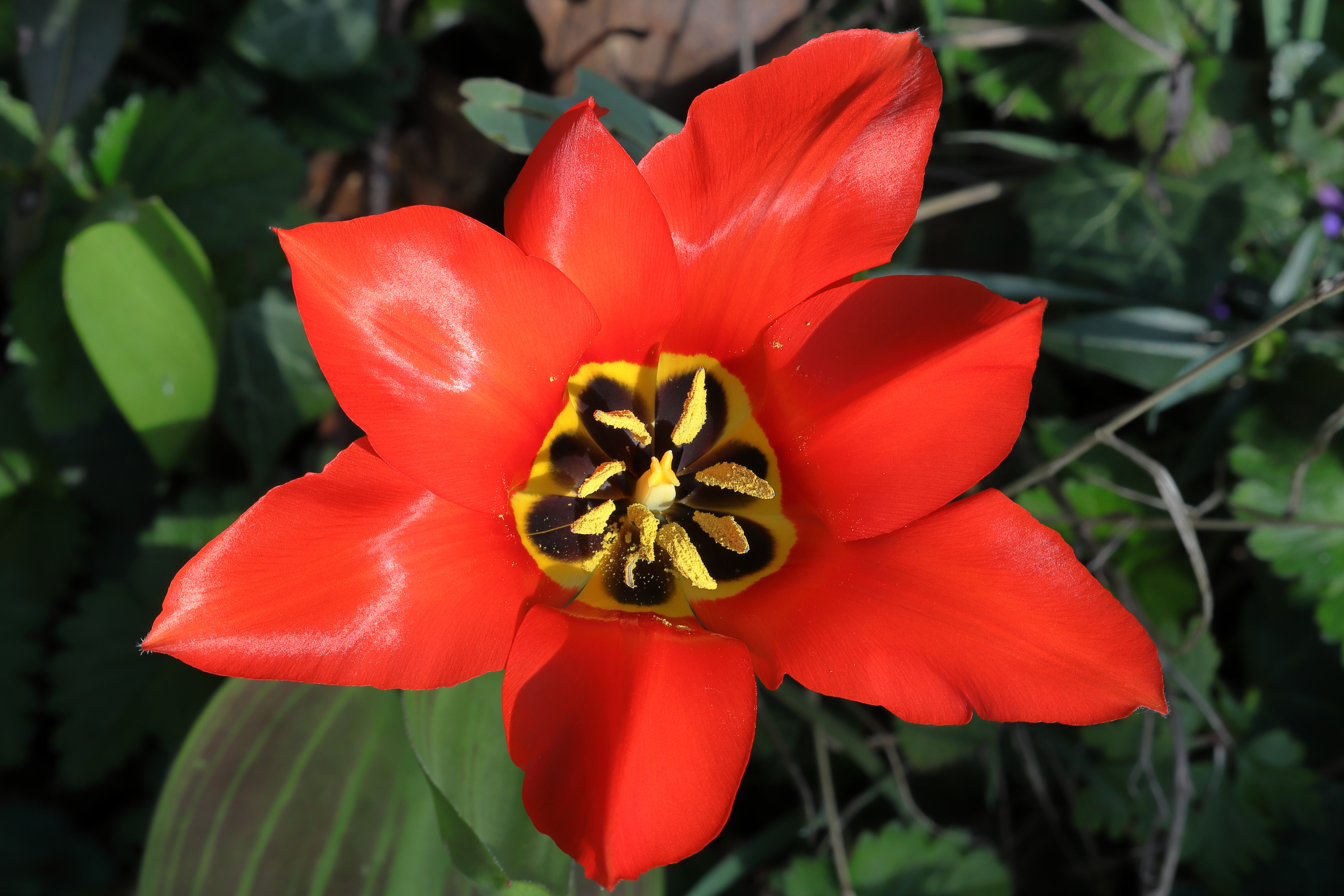
Tulip open around noon

=== Horticulture ===
The sweet-scented bisexual flowers appear during April and May. Bulbs are extremely resistant to frost and can tolerate temperatures well below freezing — a period of low temperature is necessary to induce proper growth and flowering, triggered by an increase in sensitivity to the phytohormone auxin.
