= List of Award of Garden Merit tulips =

The following is a list of tulip species and cultivars which have gained the Royal Horticultural Society's Award of Garden Merit. They are bulbous perennials, originally from sunny, open habitats in Europe and Asia. Thousands of cultivars are available in a huge range of sizes, shapes and colours (other than pure blue). They are usually sold as bulbs to be planted in autumn and winter for flowering in mid- to late spring. They are frequently treated as bedding plants, accompanied by other seasonal favourites such as wallflowers and forget-me-nots, flowering for one season before being discarded. However, in favoured locations they can be left in the ground to re-appear the following and subsequent years. Like many other bulbous plants they require a hot, dry dormant period in the summer.

== Groups ==
Tulips are divided into 15 distinct groups:-

1. Single early - cup-shaped flowers to 7 cm (3 in) in diameter, often margined with contrasting colour; early to mid-spring
2. Double early - fully double bowl-shaped flowers to 8 cm (3 in) in diameter, often margined with contrasting colour; mid-spring
3. Triumph - single flowers to 6 cm (2 in) in diameter; mid- to late spring
4. Darwin hybrid - single flowers to 7 cm (3 in) in diameter; mid- to late spring
5. Single late - cup-shaped flowers to 7 cm (3 in) in diameter, includes the old cottage and Darwin groups; late spring
6. Lily-flowered - long, narrow blooms with flared, pointed petals; late spring
7. Fringed - edges of petals are fringed with a different colour; late spring
8. Viridiflora - flowers striped with green, or entirely green; late spring
9. Rembrandt - "broken" colours (striped or feathered) caused by a virus; late spring
10. Parrot - unevenly striped with irregularly cut edges; late spring
11. Double late - peony-shaped fully double flowers; late spring
12. Kaufmanniana - T. kaufmanniana and its hybrids, multi-coloured; early to mid-spring
13. Fosteriana - T. fosteriana and its hybrids; mid-spring
14. Greigii - T. greigii and its hybrids; early to mid-spring
15. Miscellaneous - all species and hybrids not included elsewhere; the smaller species require sharp drainage and are best grown in an alpine garden

== Listing ==
name	species	division	colour	height (cm)	ref	image
Ad Rem		Darwin	orange-red	60		
Ali Baba		greigii	red	25		
Ancilla		Kaufmanniana	white/red	20		
Angélique		double late	pink (pale)/green	30		
Angel's Wish		single late	white	50		
Apricot Beauty		single early	pink (apricot)	35		
Apricot Parrot		parrot	pink (apricot)	60		
Artist		viridiflora	salmon/purple/green	50		
Aucher's Tulip	Tulipa aucheriana	miscellaneous	rose-pink	25		
Ballade		lily-flowered	pink/white	50		
Ballerina		lily-flowered	orange/red	60		
Barcelona		triumph	pink	45		
Batalinii Group	Tulipa linifolia	miscellaneous	yellow (pale)	20		
Beau Monde		triumph	pink/white	45		
Belle du Monde		single late	pink (pale)	65		
Black Parrot		parrot	maroon (dark)	50		
Blue Heron		fringed	violet/mauve	60		
Bright Gem	Tulipa linifolia	miscellaneous	yellow/orange	20		
Burning Heart		Darwin	cream/red	100		
Calgary		triumph	white	25		
Calgary Flames		triumph	white/yellow	25		
Canasta		fringed	red/white	40		
Candela		Fosteriana	yellow	35		
Cape Town		single early	yellow/red	45		
Capri		Darwin hybrid	red	50		
Carnaval de Nice		double late	white/red	40		
Casa Grande		Greigii	red	50		
China Pink		lily-flowered	pink (rose)	50		
China Town		viridiflora	pink/green	30		
Corsage		greigii	orange	25		
Cynthia	Tulipa clusiana	miscellaneous	cream/pink	25		
Daydream		Darwin hybrid	orange	50		
Don Quichotte		triumph	cerise pink	45		
Dordogne		single late	orange/pink	65		
Dreamland		single late	pink/white	60		
Drumline		double late	rose/white	50		
Early Harvest		Kaufmanniana	red/yellow	25		
Esperanto		viridiflora	red/cream/pink	25		
Exotic Sun		fringed	yellow double	45		
Fancy Frills		fringed	pink/white	45		
Fantasy		parrot	pink (salmon)	50		
Fidelio		triumph	pink/yellow	40		
Fringed Beauty		fringed	orange/yellow	35		
Fusilier	Tulipa praestans	miscellaneous	red (scarlet)	30		
Gavota		triumph	yellow/maroon	50		
Gerbrand Kieft		double late	pink/green	40		
Halcro		single late	pink (carmine)	50		
Honky Tonk	Tulipa linifolia	miscellaneous	yellow (pale)	25		
Ivory Floradale		Darwin hybrid	white (ivory)	60		
Juan		fosteriana	orange/yellow	25		
Kiev		greigii	yellow/red	30		
Kingsblood		single late	red	60		
Lady Jane	Tulipa clusiana	miscellaneous	pink/white	25		
Lilac Wonder	Tulipa saxatilis	miscellaneous	pink (pale)/yellow	25		
Little Beauty		miscellaneous	pink/purple/red	12		
Little Princess		miscellaneous	orange/yellow/black	12.5		
Maureen		single late	yellow (pale)	60		
Menton		single late	pink/orange	73		
Monte Carlo		double early	yellow	30		
Moonlight Girl		lily-flowered	yellow/white	55		
Mother's Love		Greigii	red/yellow	25		
Ollioules		Darwin hybrid	pink (flesh)	40		
Olympic Flame		Darwin hybrid	yellow/red	50		
Orange Emperor		fosteriana	orange	45		
Orange Princess		double late	orange	30		
Oranje Nassau		double early	orange/red	35		
Oranjezon		Darwin hybrid	orange	55		
Oratorio		Greigii	orange/pink	20		
Oxford		Darwin hybrid	orange (scarlet)/yellow	60		
Parade		Darwin hybrid	red (scarlet)	50		
Paul Scherer		triumph	purple	50		
Peppermintstick	Tulipa clusiana	miscellaneous	pink/white	30		
Pink Impression		Darwin hybrid	pink (deep)	55		
Plaisir		Greigii	red/yellow	15		
Prinses Irene		Triumph	orange/purple	35		
Purissima		Fosteriana	white (cream)	35		
Red Georgette		single late	red	40		
Red Hat		fringed	red	50		
Red Impression		Darwin hybrid	red	60		
Red Princess		double late	red	35		
Red Riding Hood		Greigii	red (scarlet)	20		
Red Shine		lily-flowered	red (ruby)	60		
Reputation		triumph	red/white	45		
Seadov		triumph	red	30		
Sensual Touch		fringed	orange	40		
Showwinner		Kaufmanniana	red (scarlet)	20		
Sorbet		single late	white/red	60		
Spring Green		viridiflora	white/green	40		
Spryng		triumph	red	30		
Starlight	Tulipa bifloriformis	miscellaneous	yellow (pale)	5		
Stockholm		double early	red	30		
Stresa		Kaufmanniana	red/yellow	25		
Strong Gold		triumph	yellow	45		
Tangerine Beauty	Tulipa vvedenskyi	miscellaneous	orange/yellow	20		
Temple of Beauty		single late	pink (deep, salmon)	60		
Timeless		triumph	red/white	45		
Tinka		miscellaneous	yellow/red	25		
Toronto		Greigii	red (coral)	20		
Trinket		Greigii	red/cream	20		
	Tulipa altaica	miscellaneous	yellow	25		
	Tulipa clusiana var chrysantha	miscellaneous	yellow	5		
	Tulipa kolpakowskiana	miscellaneous	yellow/green	20		
	Tulipa linifolia	miscellaneous	red (scarlet)	20		
	Tulipa sprengeri	miscellaneous	red	50		
	Tulipa tarda	miscellaneous	white/yellow	15		
	Tulipa turkestanica	miscellaneous	white/yellow	30		
	Tulipa urumiensis	miscellaneous	yellow	20		
United States		Greigii	yellow/red	25		
Vincent van Gogh		fringed	purple	50		
White Triumphator		lily-flowered	white	60		
World Expression		single late	yellow/red	55		
Yellow Baby		double early	yellow	20		
Zampa		greigii	cream/yellow/red	20		
