= Allium ferganicum =

Scientific classification
- Kingdom: Plantae
- Clade: Tracheophytes
- Clade: Angiosperms
- Clade: Monocots
- Order: Asparagales
- Family: Amaryllidaceae
- Subfamily: Allioideae
- Genus: Allium
- Species: A. ferganicum

Binomial name
- Allium ferganicum Vved.

Species of plant

Allium ferganicum is a species of flowering plant in the family Amaryllidaceae. It is native to the Fergana Valley; Kyrgyzstan, Tajikistan, and eastern Uzbekistan. A bulbous geophyte, it is typically found in gypsum-rich soils at elevations from sea level to 800 m (2,600 ft). A study of its chloroplast genome showed that it is a close relative of Allium sativum and Allium ampeloprasum.
