= Alexander Batalin =

Russian botanist (1847–1896)

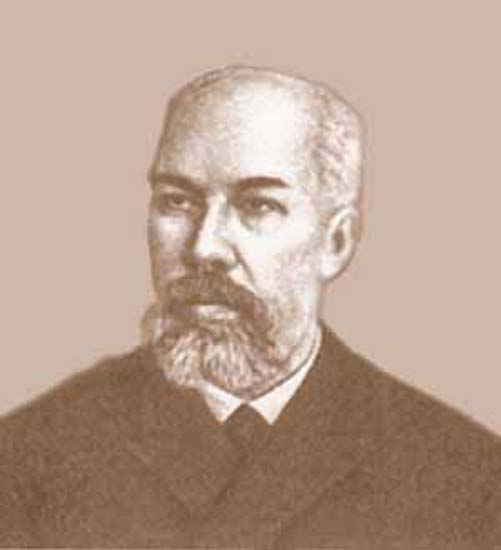
- Portrait of Alexander Batalin
- Born: 13 August 1847; Saint Petersburg, Russian Empire
- Died: 13 October 1896 (aged 49); Saint Petersburg, Russian Empire

Alexander Fyodorovich Batalin (Russian: Алекса́ндр Фёдорович Бата́лин; 13 August 1847 – 13 October 1896) was a Russian botanist. He was the Chief Botanist and Director of the Imperial Botanical Garden in St. Petersburg. His patronimic has also been transliterated as Fedorovich and Theodorowicz.

His father, Fyodor Batalin, gained renown for his two-volume work on the Caucasian Mineral Waters. After his father's death in 1895, Alexander briefly took over as editor of the Agricultural Gazette.

== Life ==
In 1860, Batalin moved from Moscow to St. Petersburg, where he studied at St. Petersburg University under the guidance of Andrey Famintsyn and Andrey Beketov. He defended his dissertations on The Influence of Light on Plant Morphology (1872) and Mechanics of Movement in Insectivorous Plants (1876).

Batalin conducted extensive research on the origins of cultivated rye and investigated the impact of soil salinity on seed viability. He described numerous new plant species and identified the new genus Corallodiscus (Ceratodiscus).

Batalin made his mark on the history of Russian agricultural science with a series of comprehensive monographs on plants cultivated in Russia, including millet, spelt, rice, buckwheat, legumes, crucifers, and oilseed crops, among others. These works marked the first systematic scientific study of cultivated plants in Russia, leading to the country's first classifications of these crop varieties.

In 1877, with the support of German professor Friedrich Nobbe, Batalin established the first seed testing and research station in the Russian Empire. He conducted detailed studies on Russian varieties of onions, tobacco, and flax, and made early attempts to identify cultivated plants based on their seeds. Some authorities claim that it was in 1894 that he established the world's oldest agricultural seed bank.

Batalin was laid to rest beside his father at the Novodevichy Cemetery, St. Petersburg.

== Legacy ==
The epithet batalinii is used to refer to Alexander Theodorowicz Batalin in a species name (e.g., Tulipa batalinii, Cattleya Batalinii ).
