= Allium praemixtum =

Scientific classification
- Kingdom: Plantae
- Clade: Tracheophytes
- Clade: Angiosperms
- Clade: Monocots
- Order: Asparagales
- Family: Amaryllidaceae
- Subfamily: Allioideae
- Genus: Allium
- Species: A. praemixtum

Binomial name
- Allium praemixtum Vved.

Species of plant

Allium praemixtum is a species of flowering plant in the family Amaryllidaceae. It is native to Kyrgyzstan, Tajikistan, and Uzbekistan. A bulbous geophyte, it is found in the Tian Shan and Pamir-Alay mountains.
