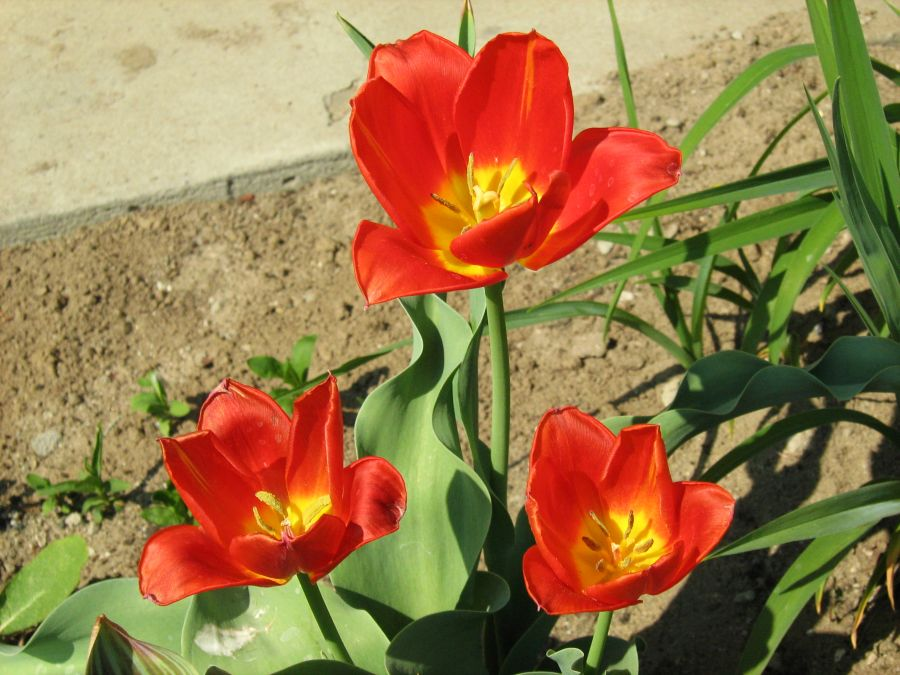
- In cultivation in Poland

Scientific classification
- Kingdom: Plantae
- Clade: Embryophytes
- Clade: Tracheophytes
- Clade: Angiosperms
- Clade: Monocots
- Order: Liliales
- Family: Liliaceae
- Subfamily: Lilioideae
- Genus: Tulipa
- Subgenus: Tulipa subg. Tulipa
- Species: T. vvedenskyi

Binomial name
- Tulipa vvedenskyi Botschantz.

= Tulipa vvedenskyi =

Species of flowering plant

Tulipa vvedenskyi is a species in the genus Tulipa, in the lily family. It is found in Tajikistan and perhaps Uzbekistan. Some authorities have it as a synonym of Tulipa alberti. Its cultivar 'Tangerine Beauty' has gained the Royal Horticultural Society's Award of Garden Merit. 'Tangerine Beauty' has large bright red flowers flamed with soft orange, and it blooms Mid-May. Another cultivar is T. vvedenskyi 'Orange Sunset'

== Etymology ==
Tulipa vvedenskyi was first published by Dr. Zinaida Petronava Botschantzeva (a botanist from Kazakhstan) in Bot. Mater. Gerb. Inst. Bot. Zool. Akad. Nauk Uzbeksk. S.S.R. Issue 14, Edition 3 in 1954.

Then in 1971, Iris zenaidae was first found by Alexei Vvedensky and he named the iris (Juno zenaidae) after Dr. Zinaida.
