= Allium drobovii =

Scientific classification
- Kingdom: Plantae
- Clade: Tracheophytes
- Clade: Angiosperms
- Clade: Monocots
- Order: Asparagales
- Family: Amaryllidaceae
- Subfamily: Allioideae
- Genus: Allium
- Subgenus: A. subg. Reticulatobulbosa
- Species: A. drobovii

Binomial name
- Allium drobovii Vved.

Synonyms
- None recorded

Species of flowering plant

Allium drobovii is a species of onion native to the southwestern spurs of the Talas Alatau and the Karatau Mountains in Kazakhstan and Uzbekistan. The plant is in the amaryllis family, originally described by Alexei Ivanovich Vvedensky. A. drobovii does not have any subspecies listed in the Catalog of Life.
