= Corallodiscus =

Scientific classification
- Kingdom: Plantae
- Clade: Tracheophytes
- Clade: Angiosperms
- Clade: Eudicots
- Clade: Asterids
- Order: Lamiales
- Family: Gesneriaceae
- Genus: Corallodiscus; Batalin

Genus of flowering plants

Corallodiscus is a genus of flowering plants belonging to the family Gesneriaceae. Its native range is Himalaya to China.

The genus was described by Alexander Batalin in the 1890s.

Species:

- Corallodiscus bhutanicus (Craib) B.L.Burtt
- Corallodiscus conchifolius Batalin
- Corallodiscus cooperi (Craib) B.L.Burtt
- Corallodiscus grandis (Craib) B.L.Burtt
- Corallodiscus kingianus (Craib) B.L.Burtt
- Corallodiscus lanuginosus (Wall. ex R.Br.) B.L.Burtt
