= Zinaida Botschantzeva =

Russian botanist and embryologist

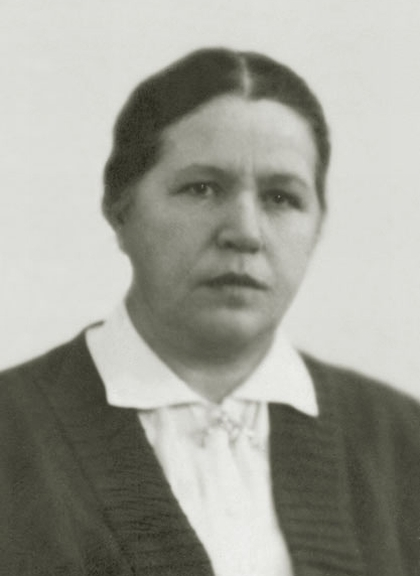
- Born: Zinaida Petrovna Botschantzeva; 10 October 1907; Almaty, Russian Empire
- Died: 17 August 1973 (aged 65); Tashkent, Uzbek SSR, Soviet Union
- Citizenship: Soviet Union
- Scientific career
- Fields: botanist embryologist
- Author abbrev. (botany): Botschantz

Zinaida Petrovna Botschantzeva (10 October 1907 – 17 August 1973) was a Soviet and Russian botanist, cytologist, embryologist, and professor of the Tashkent university.

Botschantzeva came from a large Cossack family. In 1930 she graduated with a biology degree from the National University of Uzbekistan. In 1930-1933 she participated in expeditions to study the flora of Central Asia. Her research advisor was Alexei Ivanovich Vvedensky.

Botschantzeva conducted her own research the National University of Uzbekistan where she became a professor in 1966. Her main research interests were the morphology, cytology and biology of wild plants, especially of tulips, which later made her a pioneer in this field. She was the head of departments of biology and cytology of the Botanical Garden of the Academy of Sciences of Uzbekistan. She was the author of more than 50 scientific papers. In 1960 she defended her doctoral thesis on the Morphology, Cytology and Biology of Tulips. Her dissertation was included into a monograph that was published in 1962. The book was rich in material on Central Asian and Caucasus wild tulips. This remarkable work was reissued in 1981 in the Netherlands and translated into English in 1982.

She has described 6 new tulip species from various regions of Central Asia:

- Tulipa vvedenskyi Botschantz.
- Tulipa affinis Botschantz.
- Tulipa butkovii Botschantz.
- Tulipa anadroma Botschantz.
- Tulipa tschimganica Botschantz.
- Tulipa uzbekistanica Botschantz. & Sharipov

The botanist Victor Botchantsev was a younger brother of Botschantzeva. She was awarded with the Order of Lenin and the Order of the Red Banner of Labour. Buried at the Botkin Cemetery in Tashkent.

== Works ==
- Botschantzeva, Z. P. (1982). Tulips: taxonomy, morphology, cytology, phytogeography and physiology. CRC Press. p. 120. ISBN 90-6191-029-3.

== Named for ==
- Tulipa zenaidae Vved.
- Tulipa botschantzevae S.N.Abramova & Zakalyabina.
- Iris zenaidae (Vved.)
