= Vvedenskya =

Scientific classification
- Kingdom: Plantae
- Clade: Tracheophytes
- Clade: Angiosperms
- Clade: Eudicots
- Clade: Asterids
- Order: Apiales
- Family: Apiaceae
- Subfamily: Apioideae
- Genus: Vvedenskya; Korovin
- Species: V. pinnatifolia

Binomial name
- Vvedenskya pinnatifolia Korovin

Synonyms
- Conioselinum pinnatifolium (Korovin) Schischk.

Species of flowering plant

Vvedenskya is a monotypic genus of flowering plants belonging to the family Apiaceae. It just contains one species, Vvedenskya pinnatifolia Korovin It is also in Subfamily Apioideae.

Its native range is Uzbekistan.

The genus name of Vvedenskya is in honour of Aleksai Ivanovich Vvedensky (1898–1972), a Russian botanist, who worked at herbariums in Penza and Tashkent, Uzbekistan. The Latin specific epithet of pinnatifolia is a compound word derived from pinnate meaning feathered and folia from foliage meaning leaves. Both the genus and the species were first described and published in Bot. Mater. Gerb. Inst. Bot. Zool. Akad. Nauk Uzbeksk. S.S.R. Vol.8 on pages 13-14 in 1947.

Schischkin (1951) considered the genus of Vvedenskya Korovin (1947: 14) doubtful and transferred its only species to the genus Conioselinum Fisch. ex Hoffmann (1814: 180). Tojibaev K.Sh. 2020 agreed.
