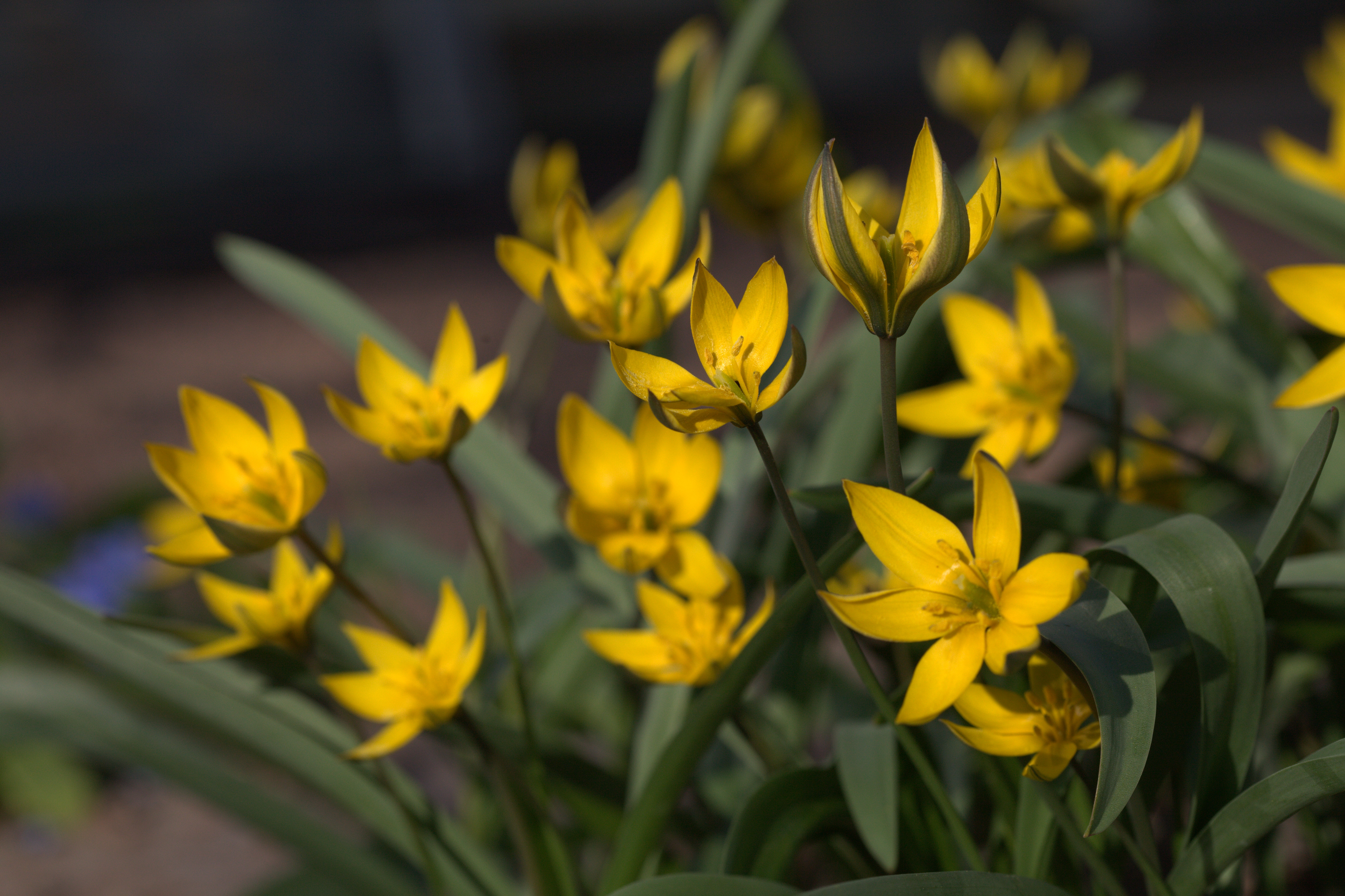

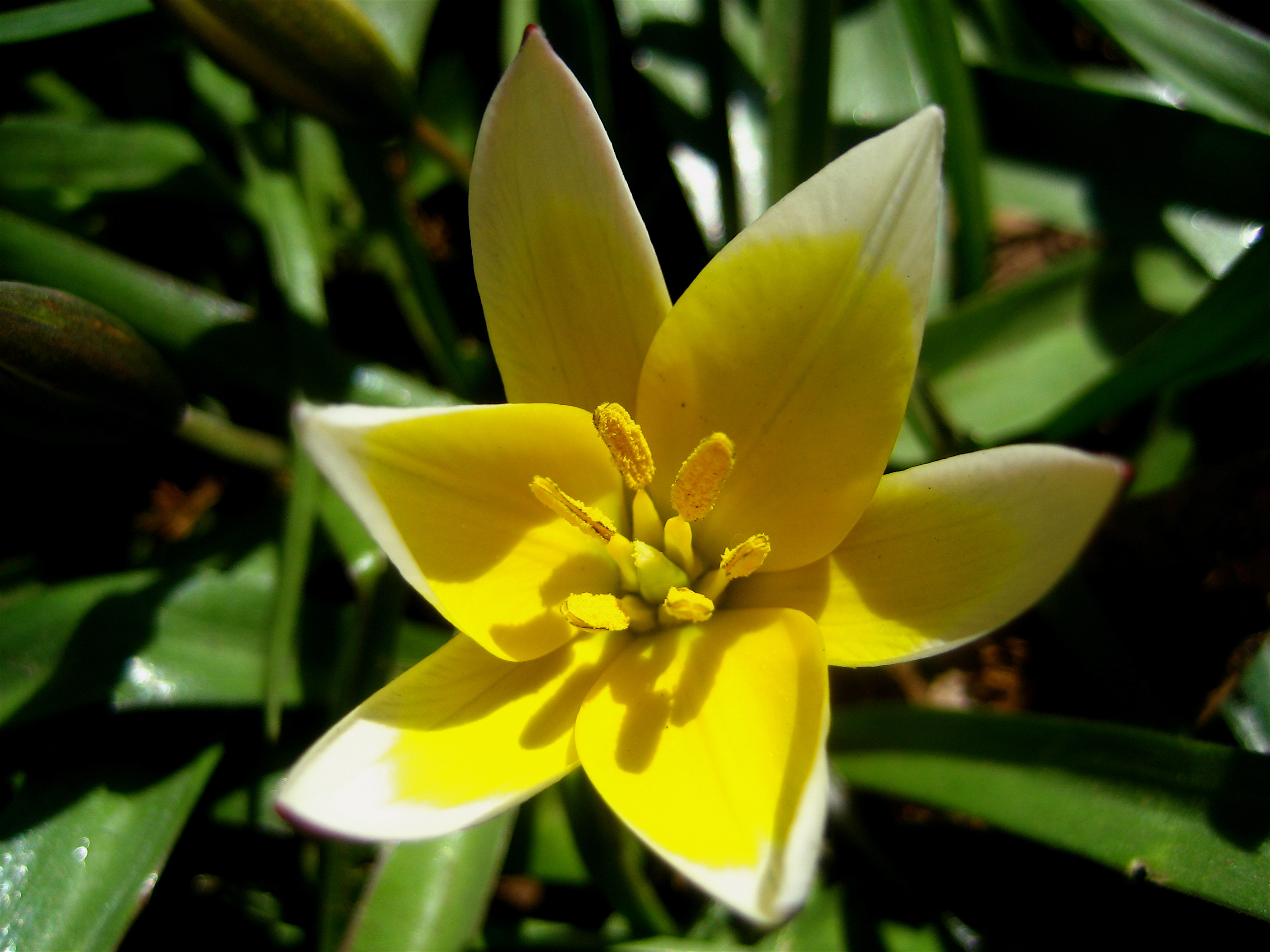

Scientific classification
- Kingdom: Plantae
- Clade: Tracheophytes
- Clade: Angiosperms
- Clade: Monocots
- Order: Liliales
- Family: Liliaceae
- Subfamily: Lilioideae
- Tribe: Lilieae
- Genus: Tulipa
- Species: T. dasystemon

Binomial name
- Tulipa dasystemon (Regel) Regel

Synonyms
- Orithyia dasystemon Regel; Tulipa dasystemonoides Vved.; Tulipa neustruevae Pobed.; Tulipa paradasystemon Vved.

= Tulipa dasystemon =

Species of flowering plant

Tulipa dasystemon, synonym Tulipa neustruevae, is a bulbous herbaceous perennial species of tulip (Tulipa) in the family Liliaceae. It belongs to the section Biflores.

== Description ==
The small bulb has a dark, papery tunic in most populations. It produces two green pairs of linear leaves which are up to 15 cm long and about 1.5 cm wide. The second pair of leaves is normally longer and narrower. The yellow tepals are up to 3 cm long and 1 cm wide, the outer three with greenish-yellow or dull purple on the outside. The anthers and filaments are yellow. Populations that have been described under the synonym Tulipa neustruevae have firmer bulb tunics, more glossy leaves, and brighter yellow flowers.

== Taxonomy ==
Tulipa dasystemon was first described by Eduard August von Regel in 1877 as Orithyia dasystemon. In 1879, he transferred it to Tulipa. It is placed in section Biflores because of the hairy filament bases.

The Russian botanist Aleksei Vvedensky mentioned a plant in 1935 in the Flora of the USSR under Tulipa dasystemon and intended to provide a scientific description as T. paradasystemon. A description under the name T. neustruevae was published by Eugenia Pobedimova in 1949. Wilford suspected it to be a low-altitude form of Tulipa dasystemon, and it is treated as such by Plants of the World Online.

== Distribution and habitat ==
Tulipa dasystemon is native to central Asia – Kazakhstan, Kyrgyzstan, Tajikistan, Uzbekistan and Xinjiang in China. It occurs on sunny slopes at altitudes up to 3,200 m. Populations that have been described under the synonym Tulipa neustruevae are found at lower altitudes.

== Cultivation ==
Tulipa dasystemon has been confused in cultivation. Bulbs sold under this name at one time were actually a different, but similar species, Tulipa urumiensis (syn. Tulipa tarda). Bulbs of this species are also cultivated under the name Tulipa neustruevae. In England, the plant is recommended for growing in an alpine house or bulb frame.

== Bibliography ==
- Wilford, Richard (2006). Tulips : Species and hybrids for the gardener. Portland: Timber Press. ISBN 978-0-88192-763-4.
