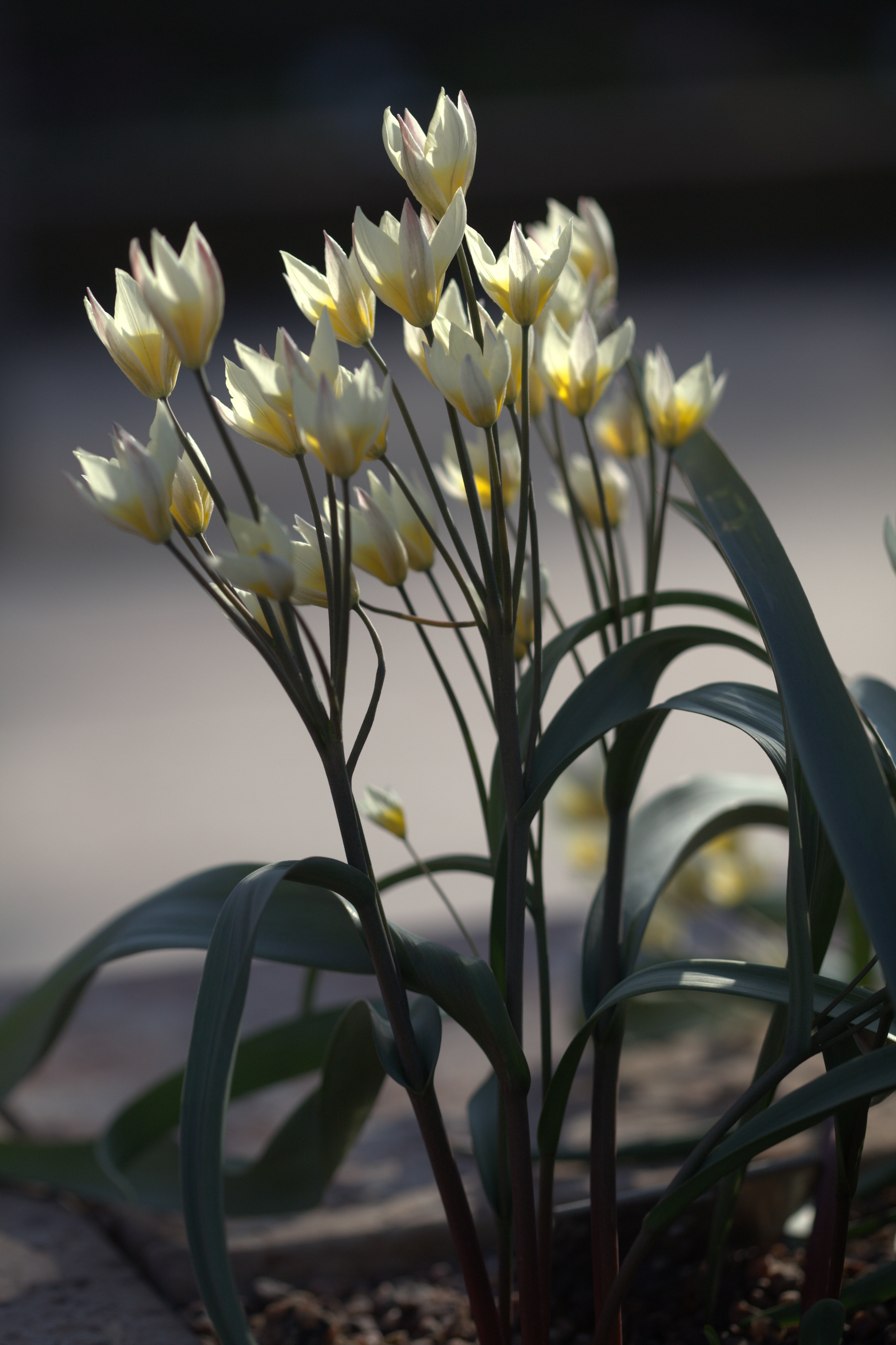
- Tulipa bifloriformis typically has multiple flowers per stem

Scientific classification
- Kingdom: Plantae
- Clade: Embryophytes
- Clade: Tracheophytes
- Clade: Spermatophytes
- Clade: Angiosperms
- Clade: Monocots
- Order: Liliales
- Family: Liliaceae
- Subfamily: Lilioideae
- Genus: Tulipa
- Species: T. bifloriformis

Binomial name
- Tulipa bifloriformis Vved.

Synonyms
- Tulipa orthopoda Vved.

= Tulipa bifloriformis =

Species of flowering plant

Tulipa bifloriformis is a species of tulip native to Central Asia. Its dwarfed 'Starlight' cultivar has gained the Royal Horticultural Society's Award of Garden Merit.

== Physical description ==
Tulipa bifloriformis comes in two different forms, a regular flower and a dwarf variant. The regular flower grows between 15–20 cm (5.9–7.9 in) and the dwarf form is 5–7 cm (2.0–2.8 in). The flower has a yellow base and a white satellite.

== Geography ==
Tulips originate from Central Asia (Uzbekistan, Turkmenistan, Kazakhstan region). Tulipa bifloriformis grows in stony or clay slops.

== History ==
The tulip is native to Central Asia but is naturalized throughout Europe thanks to trading on the Silk Road.

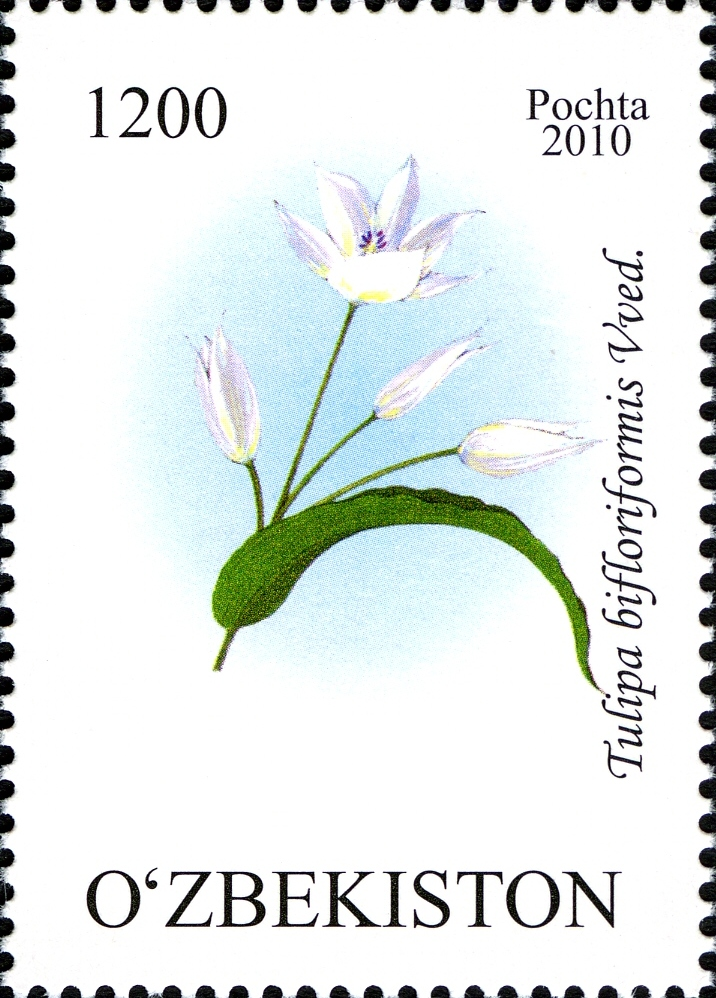
On a postage stamp of Uzbekistan
