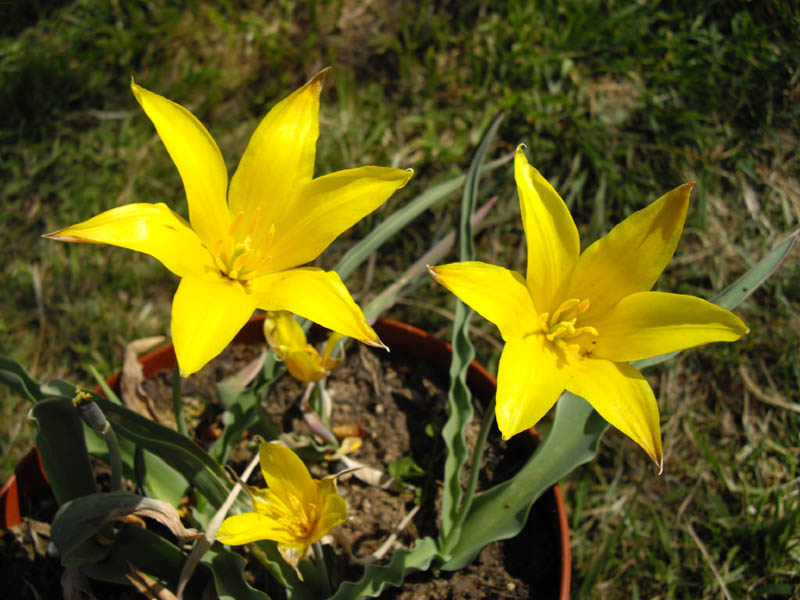

Scientific classification
- Kingdom: Plantae
- Clade: Embryophytes
- Clade: Tracheophytes
- Clade: Spermatophytes
- Clade: Angiosperms
- Clade: Monocots
- Order: Liliales
- Family: Liliaceae
- Subfamily: Lilioideae
- Genus: Tulipa
- Subgenus: Tulipa subg. Tulipa
- Species: T. altaica

Binomial name
- Tulipa altaica Pall. ex Spreng. 1825

= Tulipa altaica =

Species of flowering plant

Tulipa altaica is a species of tulip found in Russia, Kazakhstan, and China.

== Description ==
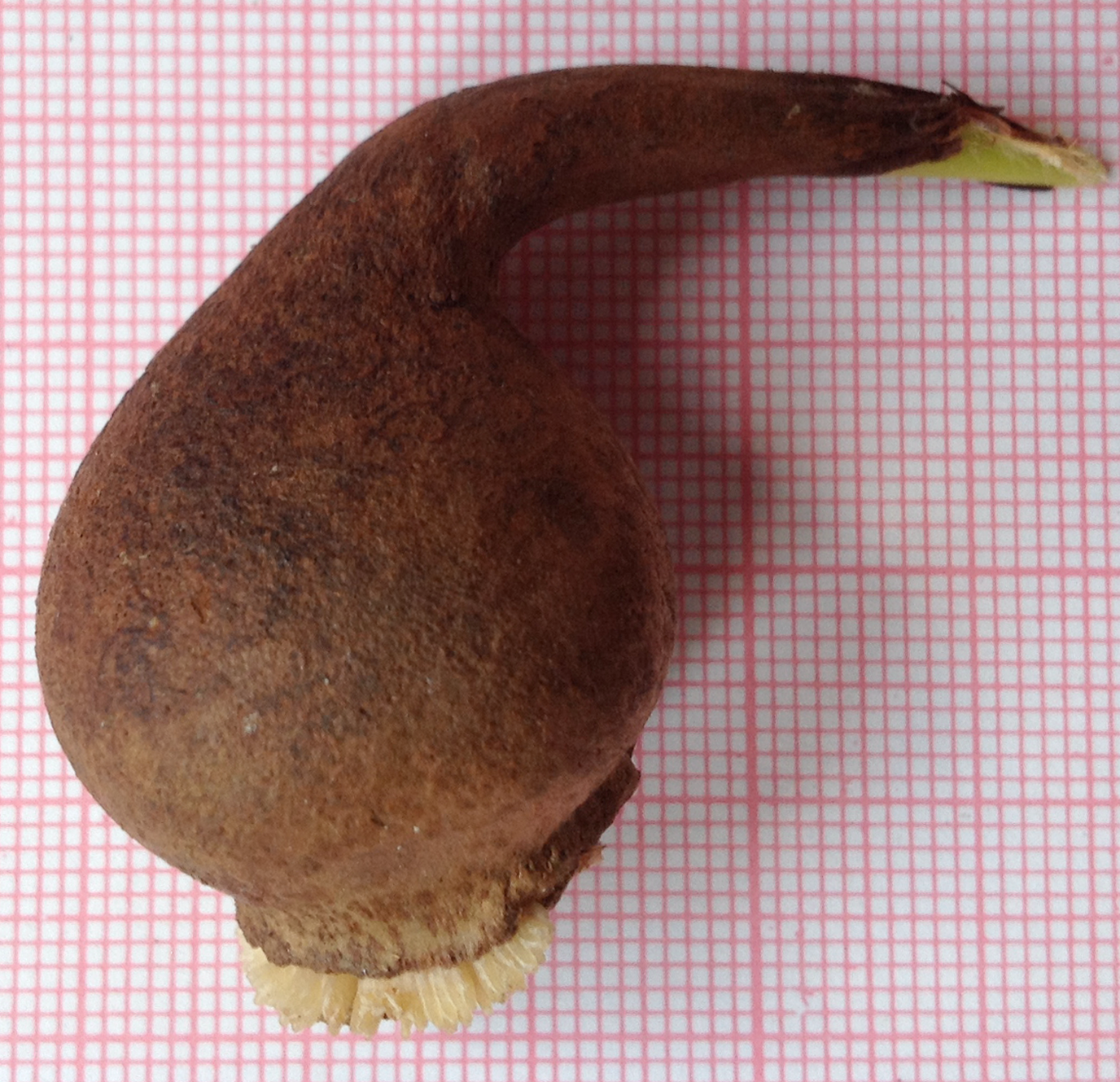
Bulb

Tulipa altaica is a perennial, herbaceous plant that grows between 10 and 20 centimeters high (rarely up to 35 centimeters).

The egg-shaped bulb has a diameter of 2 to 3.5 cm and is lengthened slightly at the tip. The paper-like outer skin that covers the bulb is brown and hairy or bald on the inside.

The sprout axis is hairy in the upper part. The plant has three or four grayish green leaves that are ovate to lanceolate. They are variable in size but do not exceed the flower size. Leaves are between 0.6 and 3 centimeters (less than 5 centimeters) wide and glabrouse or slightly hairy. The leaf edges are often corrugated.

The plant blooms with a single flower. The six petals elongated or oblongate, diamond-shaped, pointed to pointed, periosteums are between 2 and 3.5 centimeters long and 0.5 to 2 centimeters wide. They are yellow and on the outside greenish-purple or pink. The six stamens are 0.4 to 0.5 times as long as the perine leaves, bald and narrowed from the ground. The pollen measures 38.4 to 40.3 x 53.7 to 67.2 microns. Three apertures (germ openings) are located on the pollen granules. The exine is 1.9 microns thick. The stylus is very short.

After fertilization mature broadly ellipsoidal capsule fruits measure 2.5 to 4 × 1.5 to 2 centimeters. Tulipa altaica blooms in May and fruits in June and July. The chromosome number is 2n = 24, more rarely 48.

== Habitat ==
The main distribution area of Tulipa altaica is in the Altai Mountains. It also occurs in the northwest of the Xinjiang Autonomous Region in the People's Republic of China and parts of Kazakhstan. Tulipa altaica grows in thickets and on sunny slopes at altitudes between 1300 and 2600 meters.

== Cultivation ==
Tulipa altaica is cultivated as an ornamental plant, and has won the Royal Horticultural Society's Award of Garden Merit.

== Gallery ==
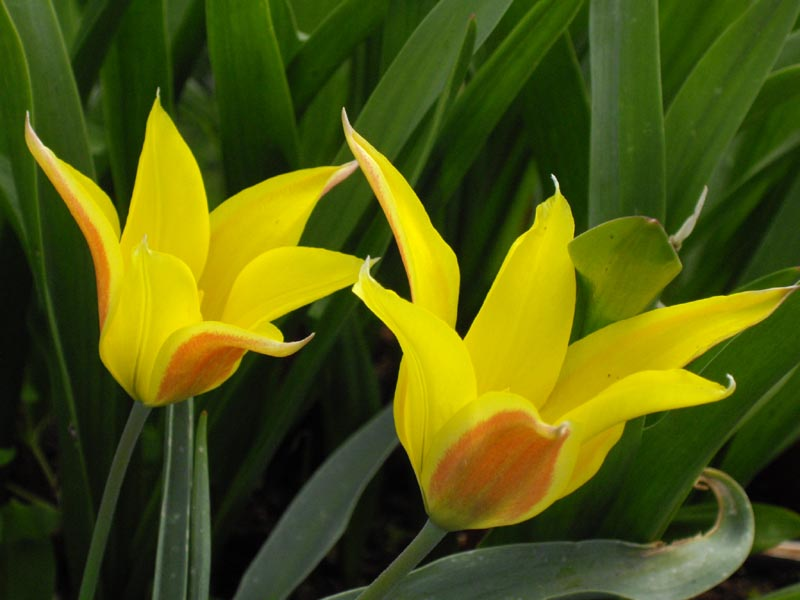

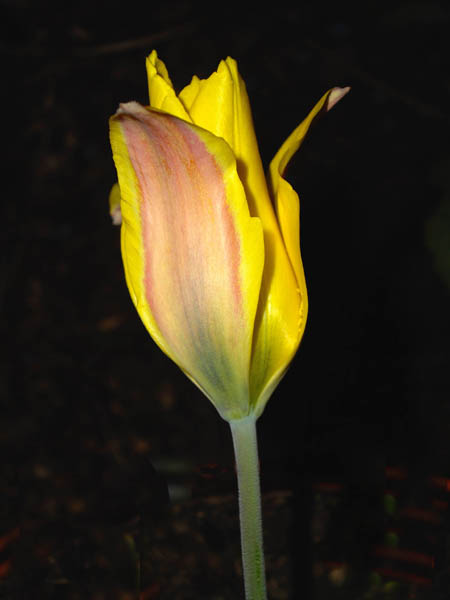

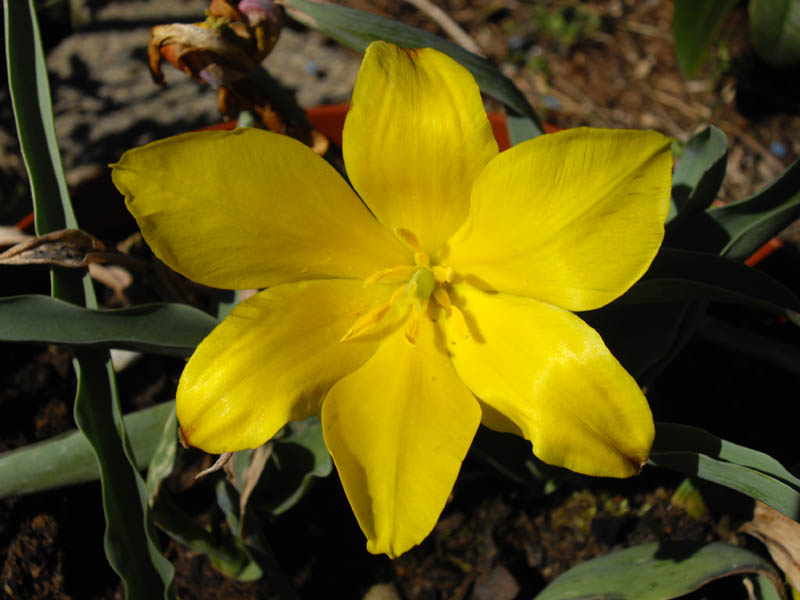

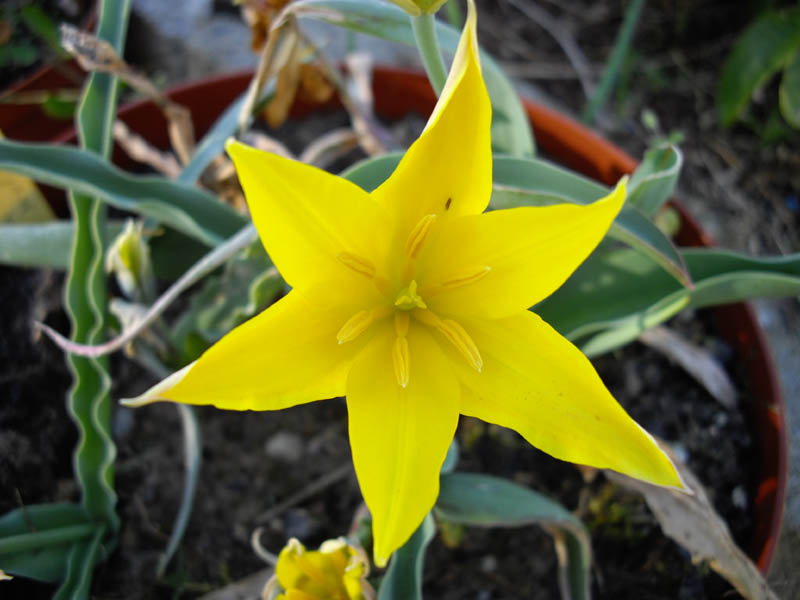
