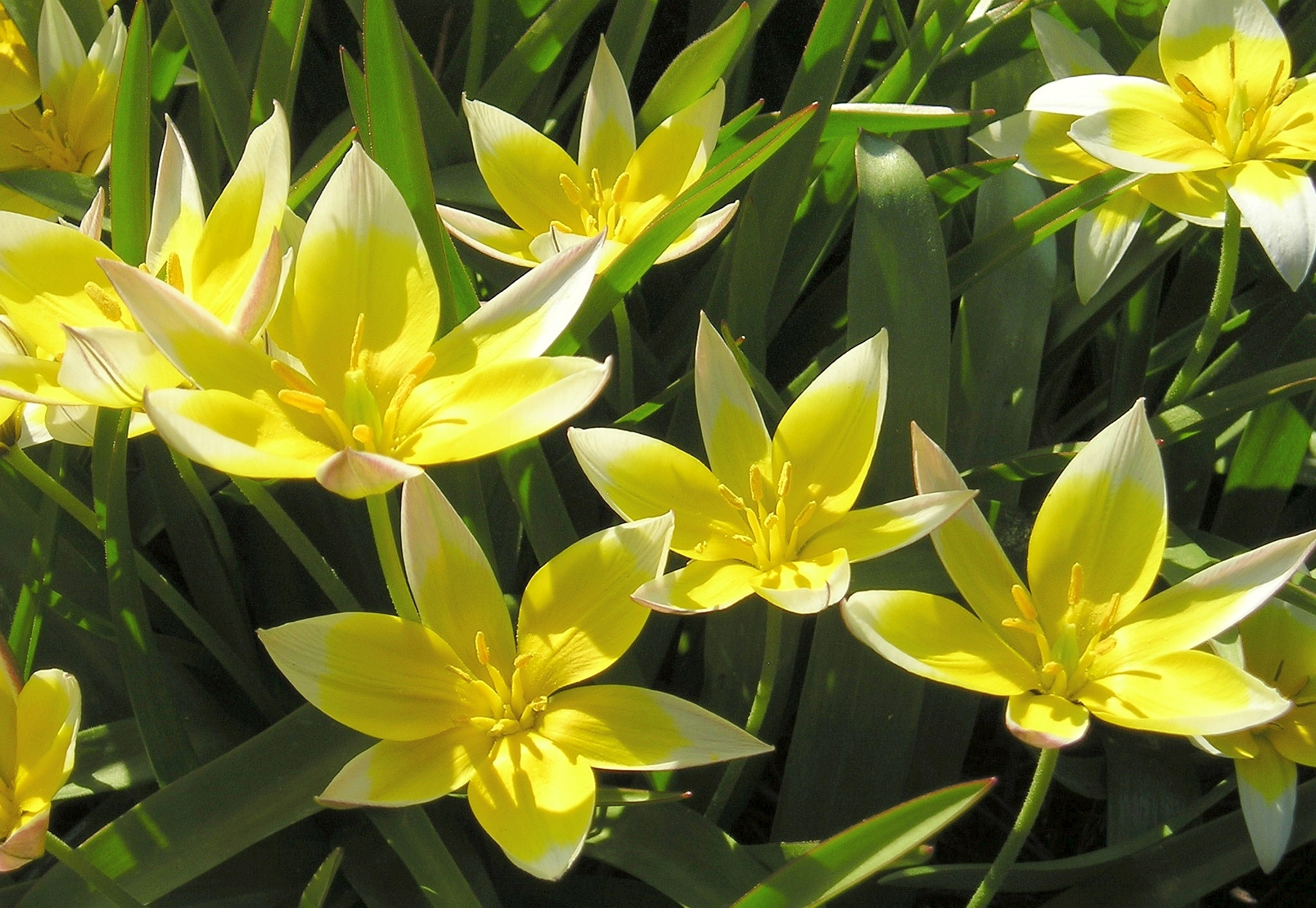

Scientific classification
- Kingdom: Plantae
- Clade: Tracheophytes
- Clade: Angiosperms
- Clade: Monocots
- Order: Liliales
- Family: Liliaceae
- Subfamily: Lilioideae
- Tribe: Lilieae
- Genus: Tulipa
- Species: T. urumiensis

Binomial name
- Tulipa urumiensis Stapf

Synonyms
- Tulipa tarda Stapf

= Tulipa urumiensis =

Species of flowering plant

Tulipa urumiensis, the late tulip or tardy tulip, is a species of flowering plant in the family Liliaceae. It is a perennial growing from a bulb. By some sources the accepted name is Tulipa tarda. It has a leathery tunic that is glabrous on the inside. It has up to seven linear green leaves that can be up to 20 cm long. The stem is between 4 and 20 cm long. The yellow flowers have white tips, anthers and stamen are yellow.

Tulipa urumiensis is native to central Asia, growing in rocky subalpine meadows in the Tian Shan. It was confused with Tulipa dasystemon for a long time, and only scientifically described in 1932 by Otto Stapf and again as T. tarda in 1933.

The plant blooms in late April and early May in the Northern Hemisphere. The plant was accorded the Royal Horticultural Society's Award of Garden Merit in 1993.
