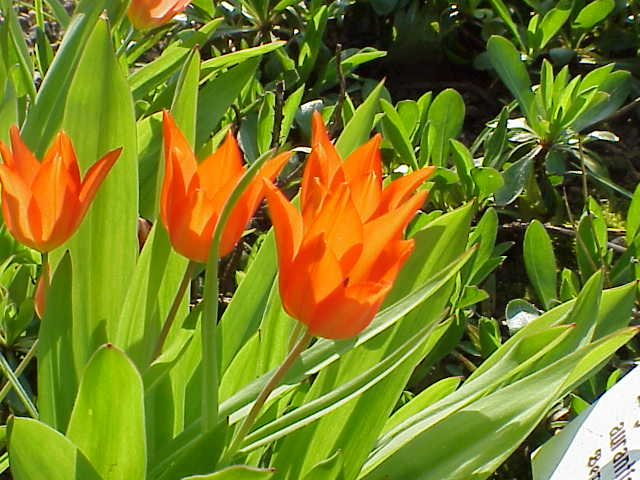

Scientific classification
- Kingdom: Plantae
- Clade: Embryophytes
- Clade: Tracheophytes
- Clade: Spermatophytes
- Clade: Angiosperms
- Clade: Monocots
- Order: Liliales
- Family: Liliaceae
- Subfamily: Lilioideae
- Genus: Tulipa
- Species: T. praestans

Binomial name
- Tulipa praestans C.A.Mey.

Synonyms
- Tulipa subpraestans Vved.

= Tulipa praestans =

Species of flowering plant

Tulipa praestans is a species of tulip native to the mountains of Tajikistan. Many well known cultivars have been formed from the original plant.

== Description ==
It is a low-growing tulip species, and has 25–45 cm (10–18 in) tall stems. It has 3 to 7 grey-green leaves that are downy and fringed with hairs (ciliate). It can have one flower (normally in the wild) or it can produce multiple flowers per bulb, meaning it can have a pair of flowers or up to a maximum of five flowers per bulb. It blooms in April, with cup shaped flowers. The flowers are 5–6.5 cm (2–3 in) wide, in orange-red, orange-scarlet, or scarlet. The anthers are yellow or purple.

== Taxonomy ==
The specific epithet praestans, refers to the Latin for 'remarkable', 'pre-eminent, superior, excellent or distinguished'.

T. praestans was originally described and published by Carl Anton von Meyer in The Gardeners' Chronicle Series 3, Vol.33 on page 239 in 1903.

== Distribution and habitat ==
It is native to temperate areas of Central Asia.

== Range ==
It is found in Tajikistan, in the Pamir-Alay mountain system.

=== Habitat ===
It grows on rocky slopes, screes, and in light woodland, at an altitude of 3,000 m (9,800 ft) above sea level.

== Cultivars ==
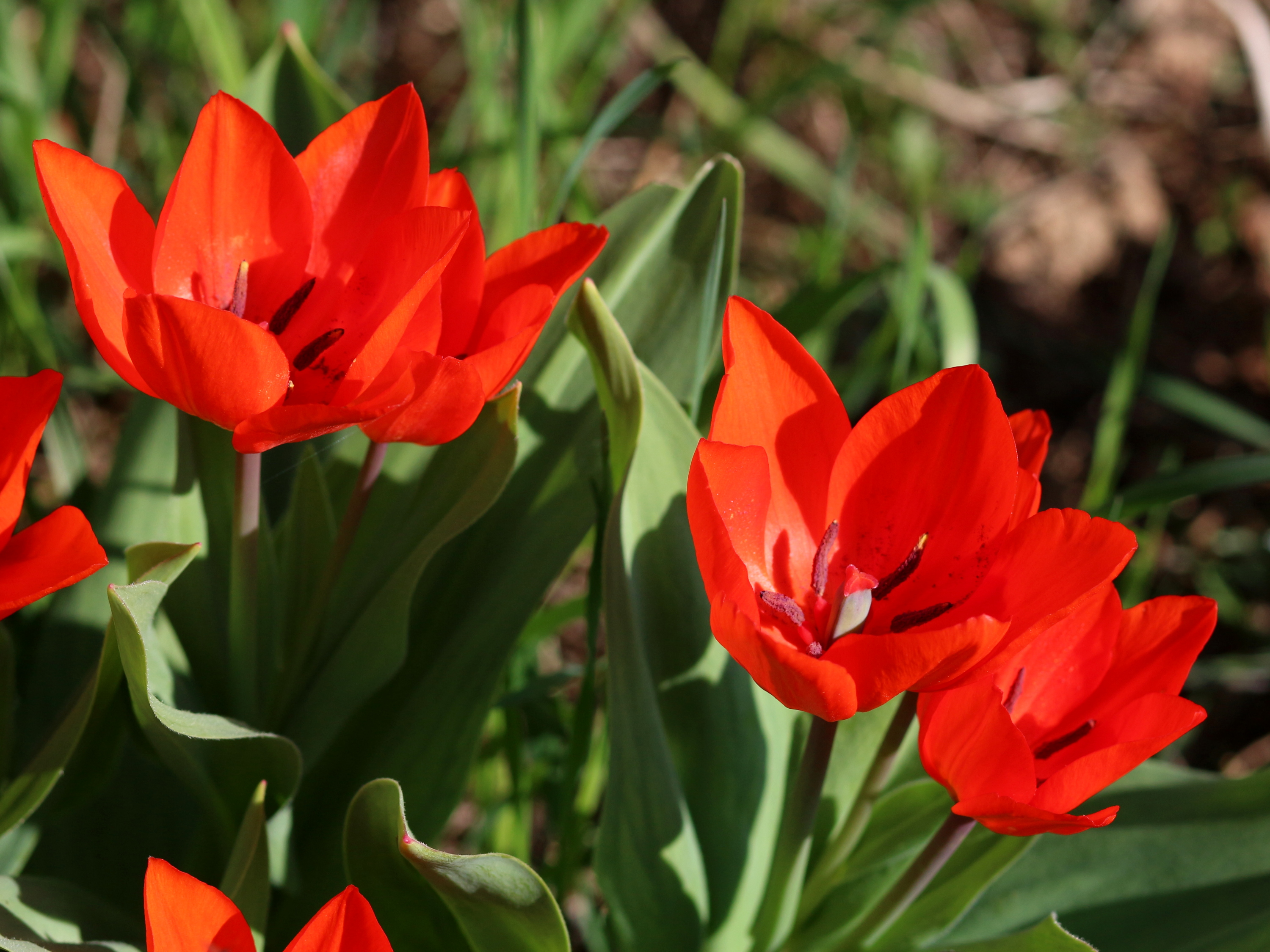
Tulipa praestans 'Fusilier'

The following cultivars represent praestans in cultivation:

- T. praestans Fuselier; grows up to 30 cm (12 in) tall, with grey-green, lance-shaped leaves and stems in mid spring, bearing between three and five, cup-shaped, brilliant red, or bright red flowers, that can measure to 12 cm across. It has gained the Royal Horticultural Society's Award of Garden Merit. It is valued by gardeners for its low growth height and habit of producing many flowers per bulb. 'Fusilier' even has a sport, 'Unicum'.
- T. praestans 'Unicum', with the leaves edged in cream.
- T. praestans 'Moondance', – has deep orange flowers which are relatively large and have pointy petals.
- T. praestans 'Zwanenburg' – Anna Pavord in her book The Tulip describes 'Zwanenburg' as having "...particularly striking flowers of a rich, clear red, which open more widely than other varieties". A taller variety at 35 cm (14 in).
- T. praestans 'Shogun' – blooming in mid- to late spring, has single, cup-shaped, yellow-orange flowers, flushed red at the base.
- T. praestans 'Tubergen's Variety' – has two to five flowers generally with a basal yellow suffusion and is a good doer, persisting in light soils without annual lifting.

== Toxicity ==
All parts may cause severe discomfort if ingested. Contact may cause a skin reaction.

== Other sources ==
- Christenhusz, M. J. M. et al. 2013. Tiptoe through the tulips – cultural history, molecular phylogenetics and classification of Tulipa (Liliaceae). Bot. * J. Linn. Soc. 172:319. Note: lists as Tulipa praestans H. B. May
- Czerepanov, S. K. 1995. Vascular plants of Russia and adjacent states (the former USSR) Cambridge University Press. Note: lists as Tulipa praestans Hoog
- Encke, F. et al. 1993. Zander: Handwörterbuch der Pflanzennamen, 14. Auflage Note: lists as Tulipa praestans Hoog
- Groth, D. 2005. pers. comm. Note: re. Brazilian common names
- Huxley, A., ed. 1992. The new Royal Horticultural Society dictionary of gardening Note: lists as Tulipa praestans Hoog
- Komarov, V. L. et al., eds. 1934–1964. Flora SSSR. Note: lists as Tulipa praestans Hoog
- Walters, S. M. et al., eds. 1986–2000. European garden flora. Note: lists as Tulipa praestans Hoog
