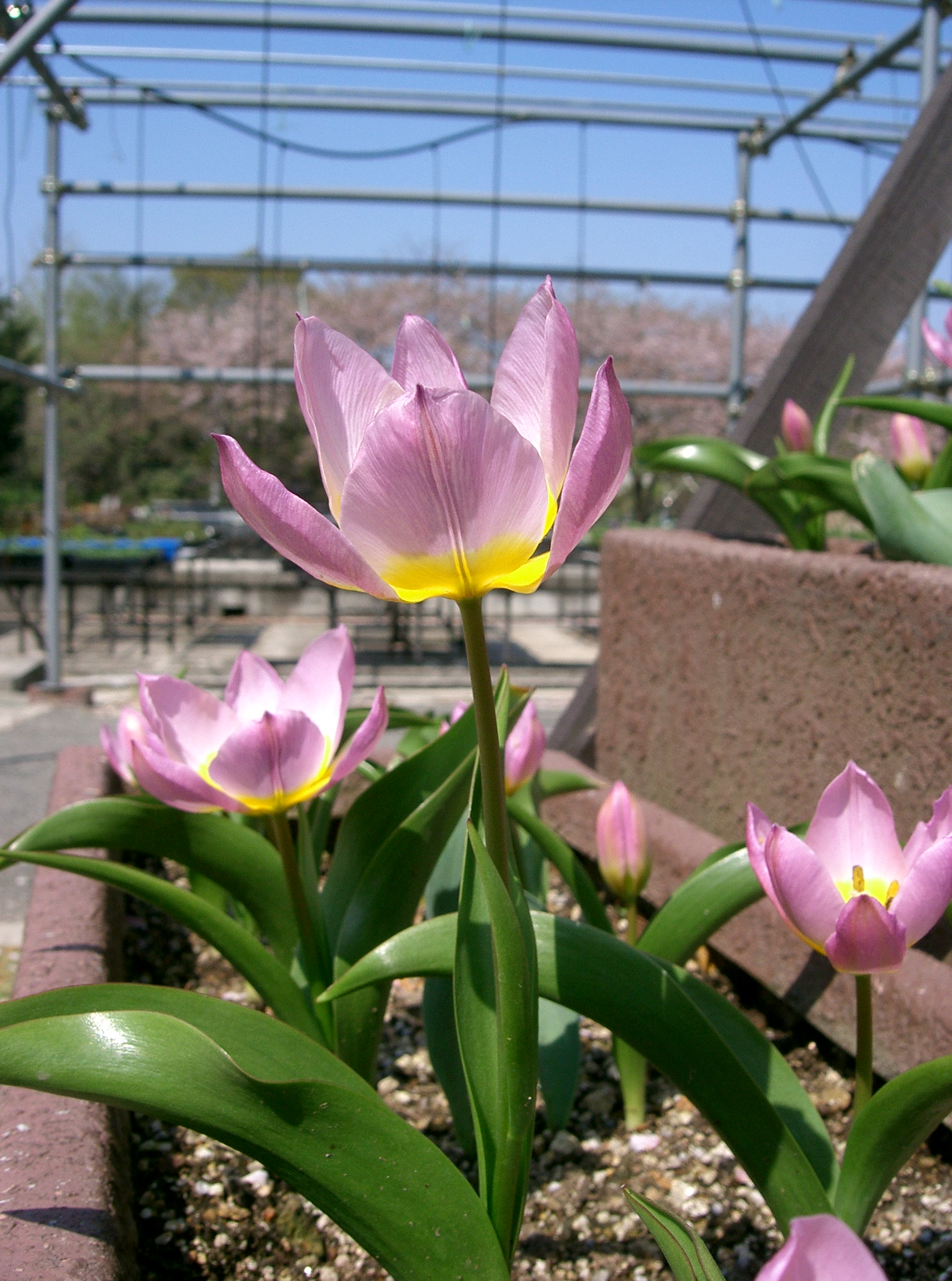
- Tulipa saxatilis 'Lilac Wonder'

Scientific classification
- Kingdom: Plantae
- Clade: Tracheophytes
- Clade: Angiosperms
- Clade: Monocots
- Order: Liliales
- Family: Liliaceae
- Subfamily: Lilioideae
- Tribe: Lilieae
- Genus: Tulipa
- Subgenus: Tulipa subg. Eriostemones
- Species: T. saxatilis

Binomial name
- Tulipa saxatilis Sieber ex Spreng.

Synonyms
- Tulipa beccariana Bicchi; Tulipa chrysobasis Coustur. & Gand.; Tulipa bakeri A.D.Hall; Tulipa saxatilis subsp. bakeri (A.D.Hall) Zonn.

= Tulipa saxatilis =

Species of flowering plant

Tulipa saxatilis (syn. Tulipa bakeri) is a Greek and Turkish species of plant in the genus Tulipa of the family Liliaceae.

== Description ==
Tulipa saxatilis is a perennial herbaceous plant. The stems can reach a height of up to 25 centimeters. This geophyte (cryptophyte) forms bulbs as resting buds. The egg-shaped bulbs have a rough shell, are 2 to 3.5 cm long and 1.5 to 3 cm wide. The two to three leaves are up to 38 centimeters long and 4.5 centimeters wide, and are flat, narrow and lanceolate with a clear gloss upper surface.

The flowers are usually single, rarely in pairs on the stem. The perianth is bright pink, with a sharply demarcated yellow centre and the petals are pointed. The three outer petals are 38 to 53 mm long and 9 to 18 mm wide, the three inner ones being the same length, but wider. The stamens are hairy at the base, with brown to black anthers that are 4.5 to 7 millimeters long. The capsule has coarse cross veins in the upper part.

The flowering period extends from March to May. There are diploid and triploid plants with 2n = 24 and 36 chromosomes.

== Distribution ==
Tulipa saxatilis is primarily a plant of the Southern Aegean islands. It is also found scattered in the limestone areas of Crete (including the islands of Gavdos and Dia), also on Karpathos and occasionally on Rhodes and the Datça peninsula in Western Turkey. It grows at the edges of fields, scree slopes and rock faces up to 900 m. The species is also cultivated as an ornamental, and is reportedly naturalized on the Greek mainland as well as in Italy and on the Scilly Isles in the United Kingdom.

== Cultivation ==
A common cultivar is 'Lilac Wonder' (illustrated), often classified as a cultivar of the subspecies T. saxatilis subsp. bakeri A.D.Hall. However, it is commonly considered to be derived from T. saxatilis sensu stricto.

The cultivar 'Lilac Wonder' (T. saxailis Bakeri Group) has been given the Royal Horticultural Society's Award of Garden Merit. It has pink flowers with yellow at the base inside.

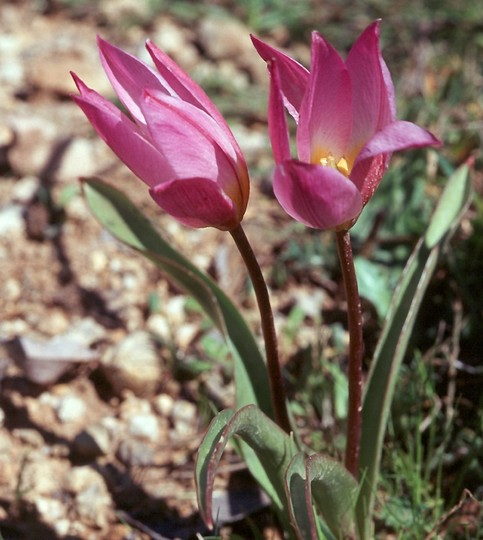

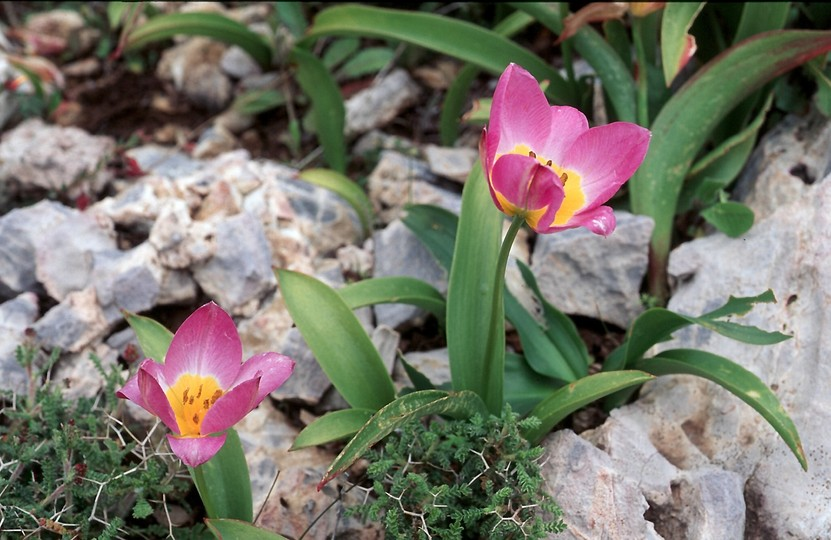
Tulipa saxatilis subsp. bakeri

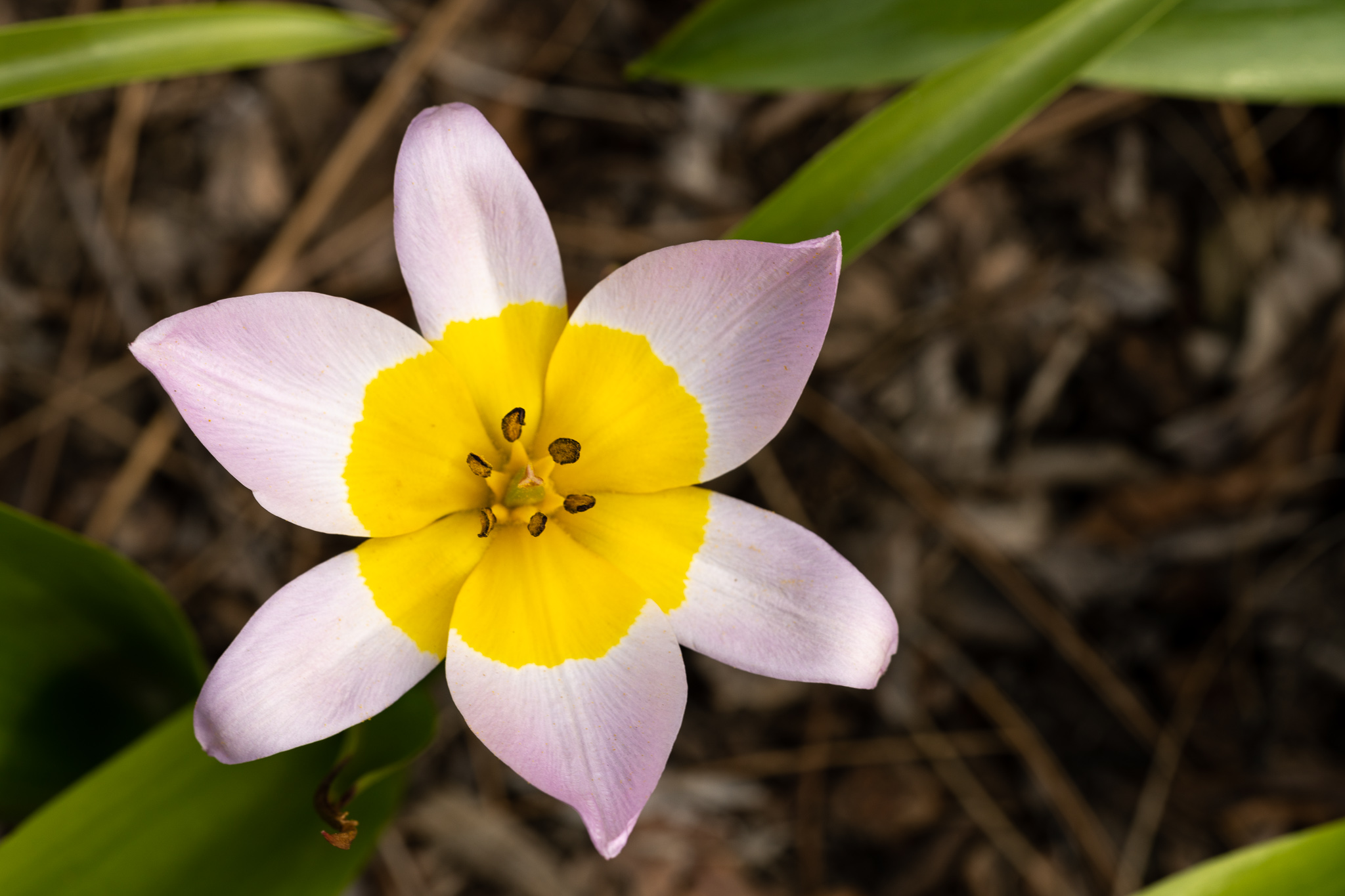
Closeup of flower of Tulipa saxatilis
