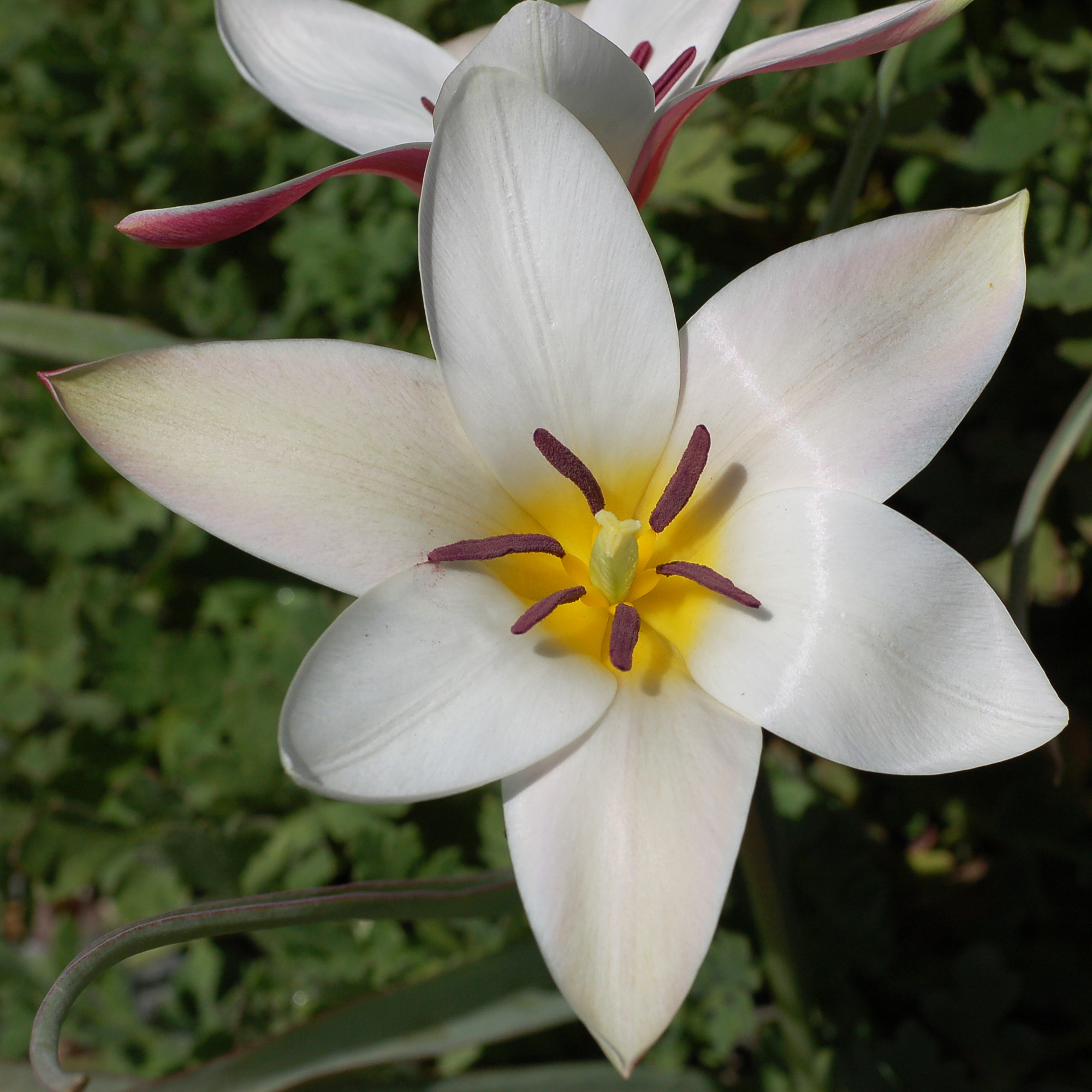
- 'Lady Jane' cultivar

Scientific classification
- Kingdom: Plantae
- Clade: Tracheophytes
- Clade: Angiosperms
- Clade: Monocots
- Order: Liliales
- Family: Liliaceae
- Subfamily: Lilioideae
- Tribe: Lilieae
- Genus: Tulipa
- Subgenus: Tulipa subg. Clusianae
- Species: T. clusiana

Binomial name
- Tulipa clusiana Red. Liliac. 1: t. 37 (1803)

Synonyms
- Synonymy: Tulipa praecox Cav.; Tulipa rubroalba Brot.; Tulipa stellata Hook.; Tulipa hispanica Willd. ex Schult. & Schult.f.; Liriactis albiflora Raf; Tulipa fernandezii Blatt.; Tulipa porphyreochrysantha Blatt.; Tulipa aitchisonii A.D.Hall; Tulipa hafisii Bornm. & Gauba; Tulipa chitralensis A.D.Hall; Tulipa grey-wilsonii Rech.f.; Tulipa oreophila Rech.f.

= Tulipa clusiana =

Lady tulip

Species of plant

Tulipa clusiana, the lady tulip, is an Asian species of tulip native to Afghanistan, Iran, Iraq, Pakistan and the western Himalayas of India. It is widely cultivated as an ornamental and is reportedly naturalized in France, Spain, Portugal, Italy, Tunisia, Greece, and Turkey.

The plant grows to a height of 6 to 12 in (15 to 30 cm). It flowers during the spring season.

The following cultivars have received the Royal Horticultural Society's Award of Garden Merit. All are relatively small, with narrow pointed tepals, often bi-coloured.

- 'Cynthia' (outsides pink edged pale yellow, insides pale yellow)
- 'Lady Jane' (inners white, outers pink bordered with white)
- 'Peppermintstick' (outers cerise pink with white borders, inners white)
- 'Tinka' (yellow inside, red bordered yellow on the outside)
- var. chrysantha (yellow flowers, flushed red on the outside)

== Gallery ==
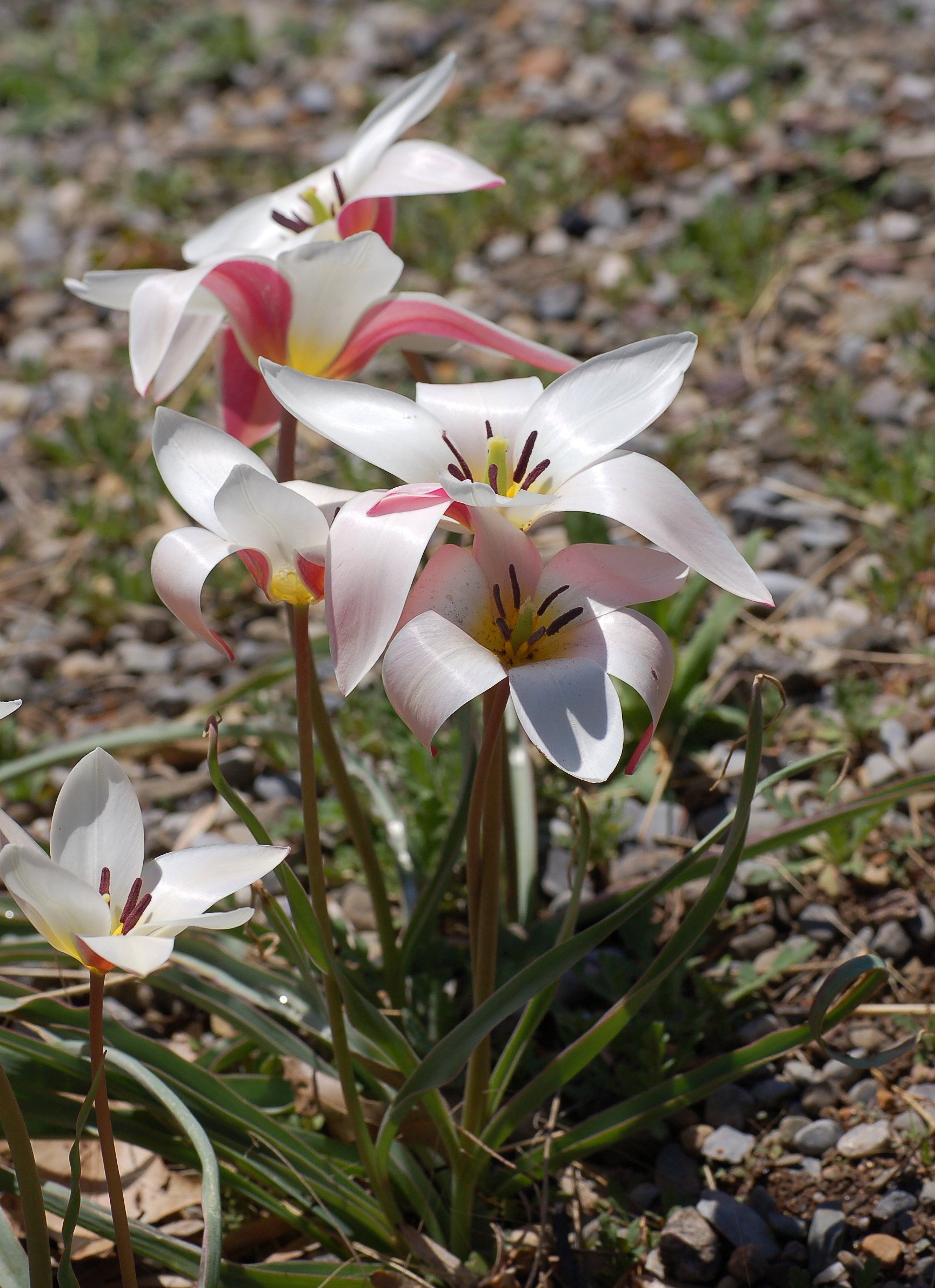
Flowering plant growing on a rocky ledge

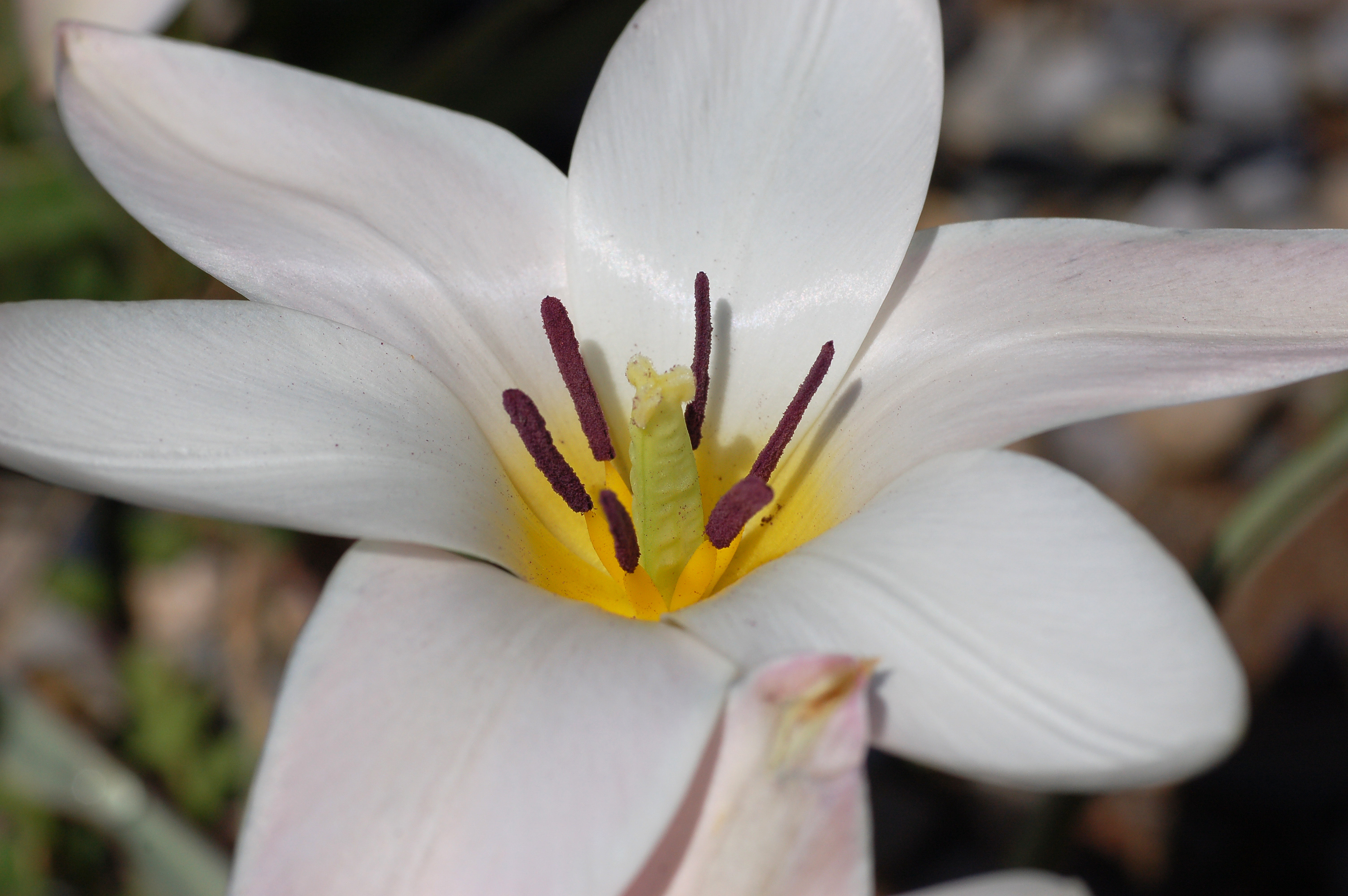
Flower closeup

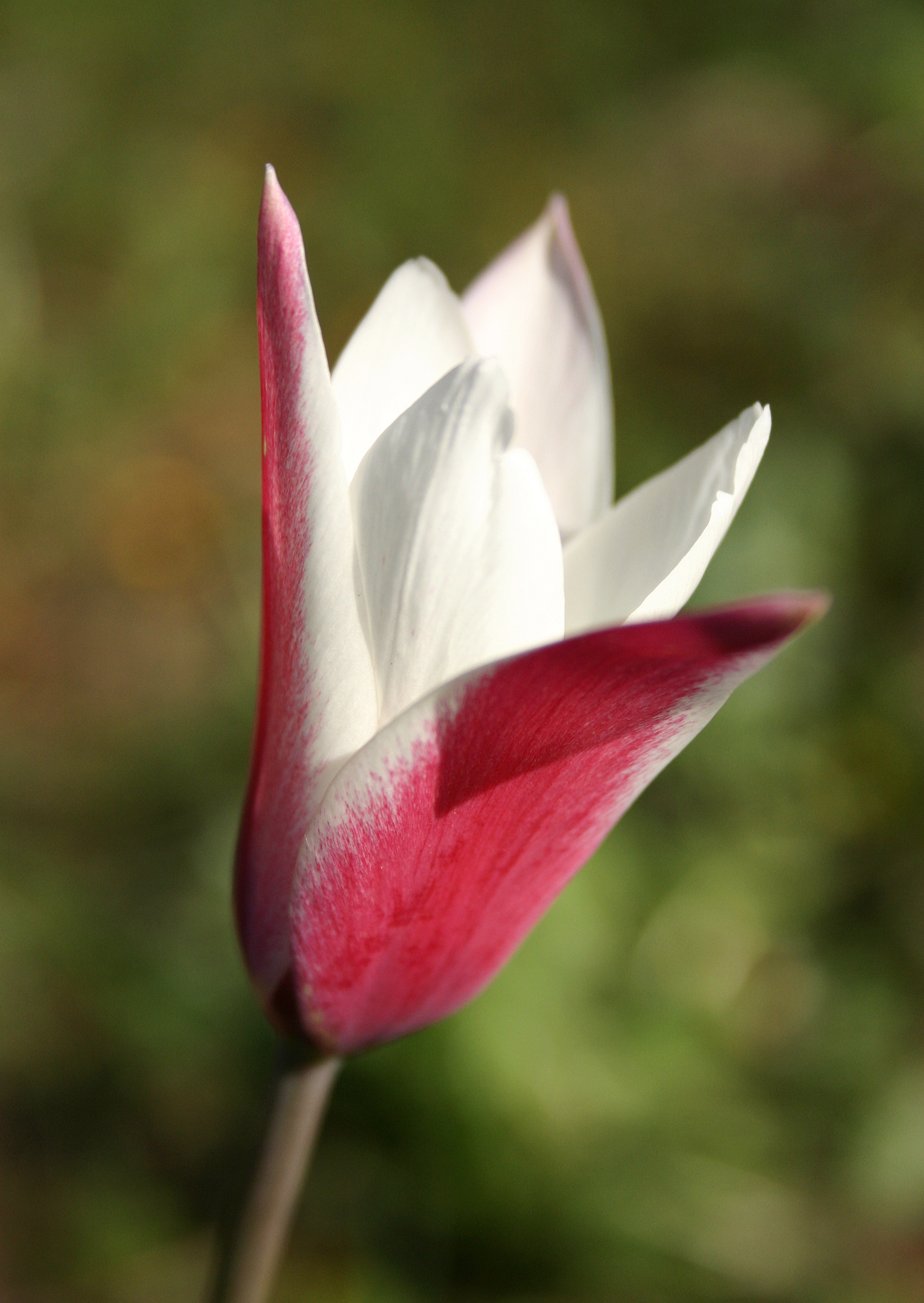
'Peppermintstick' closing up in the afternoon

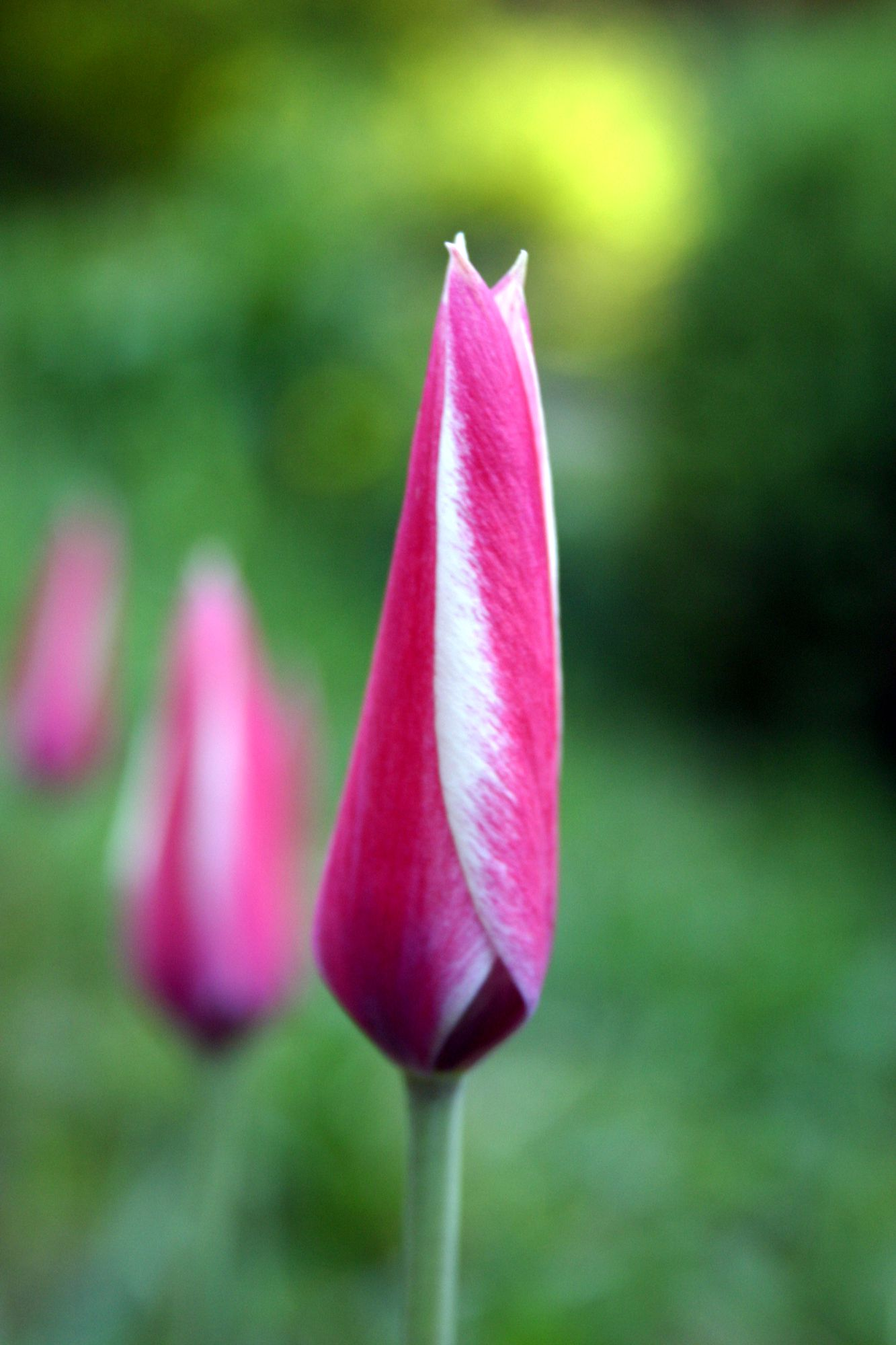
Tulipa clusiana 'Peppermintstick' in the evening
