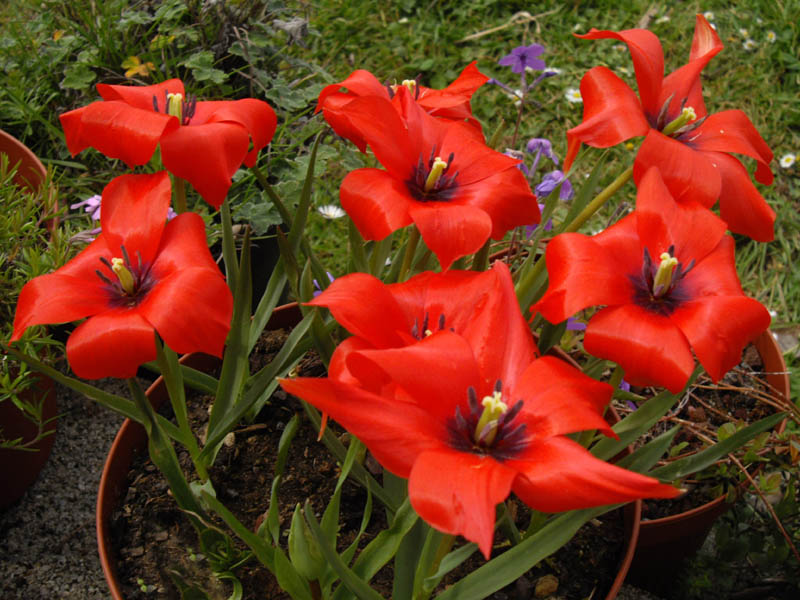

Scientific classification
- Kingdom: Plantae
- Clade: Tracheophytes
- Clade: Angiosperms
- Clade: Monocots
- Order: Liliales
- Family: Liliaceae
- Subfamily: Lilioideae
- Genus: Tulipa
- Subgenus: Tulipa subg. Clusianae
- Species: T. linifolia

Binomial name
- Tulipa linifolia Regel

Synonyms
- Tulipa batalinii Regel; Tulipa maximowiczii Regel; Tulipa afghanica Markgr.

= Tulipa linifolia =

Species of flowering plant

Tulipa linifolia, the flax-leaved tulip or Bokhara tulip, is a species of flowering plant in the tulip genus Tulipa (Clusiana group), family Liliaceae, native to Tajikistan, Uzbekistan, northern Iran and Afghanistan. Growing to 20 cm (8 in) tall, it is a bulbous perennial with wavy red-margined sword-shaped leaves, and bowl-shaped red flowers in early to mid-spring. Each petal has blackish marks at the base.

== Taxonomy ==
For a general description of the taxonomic and nomenclature confusion, see Paghat's Garden, especially for the relationship between T. linifolia and T. batalinii, and also Pacific Bulb Society. T. linifolia is often referred to in horticulture as 'Batalinii Group'. and also in some databases such as the USDA.

=== Etymology ===
The Latin specific epithet linifolia means "with leaves like flax" (Linum).

== Cultivation ==
Several cultivars are grown as ornamental plants in gardens, including 'Bronze Charm' as well as series such as Gem ('Bright Gem', 'Red Gem' and 'Salmon Gem') and Jewel ('Apricot Jewel', 'Yellow Jewel').

The following have won the Royal Horticultural Society's Award of Garden Merit:

- Tulipa linifolia Batalinii Group (pale yellow)
- Tulipa linifolia (Batalinii Group) 'Bright Gem' (yellow)
- Tulipa linifolia (Batalinii Group) 'Honky Tonk'
- Tulipa linifolia (Batalinii Group) 'Red Hunter' (red)

== Gallery ==
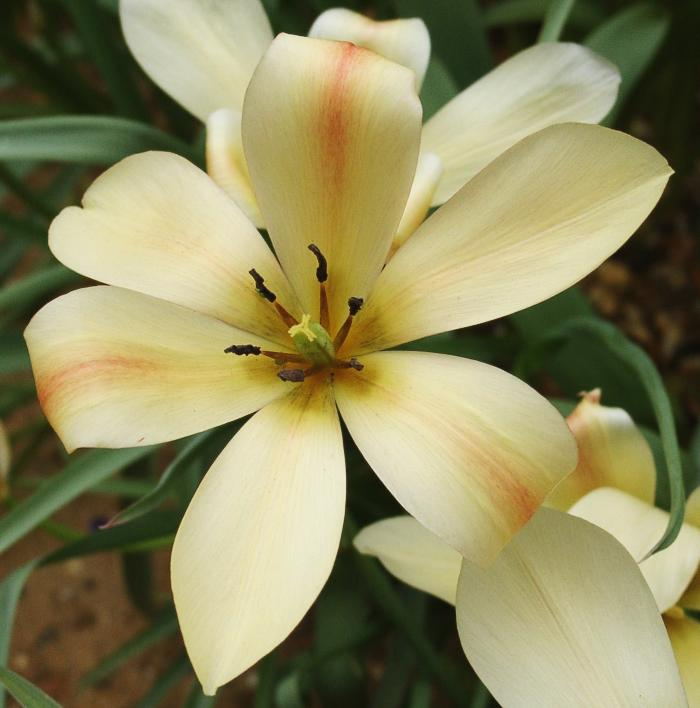
'Bronze Charm'

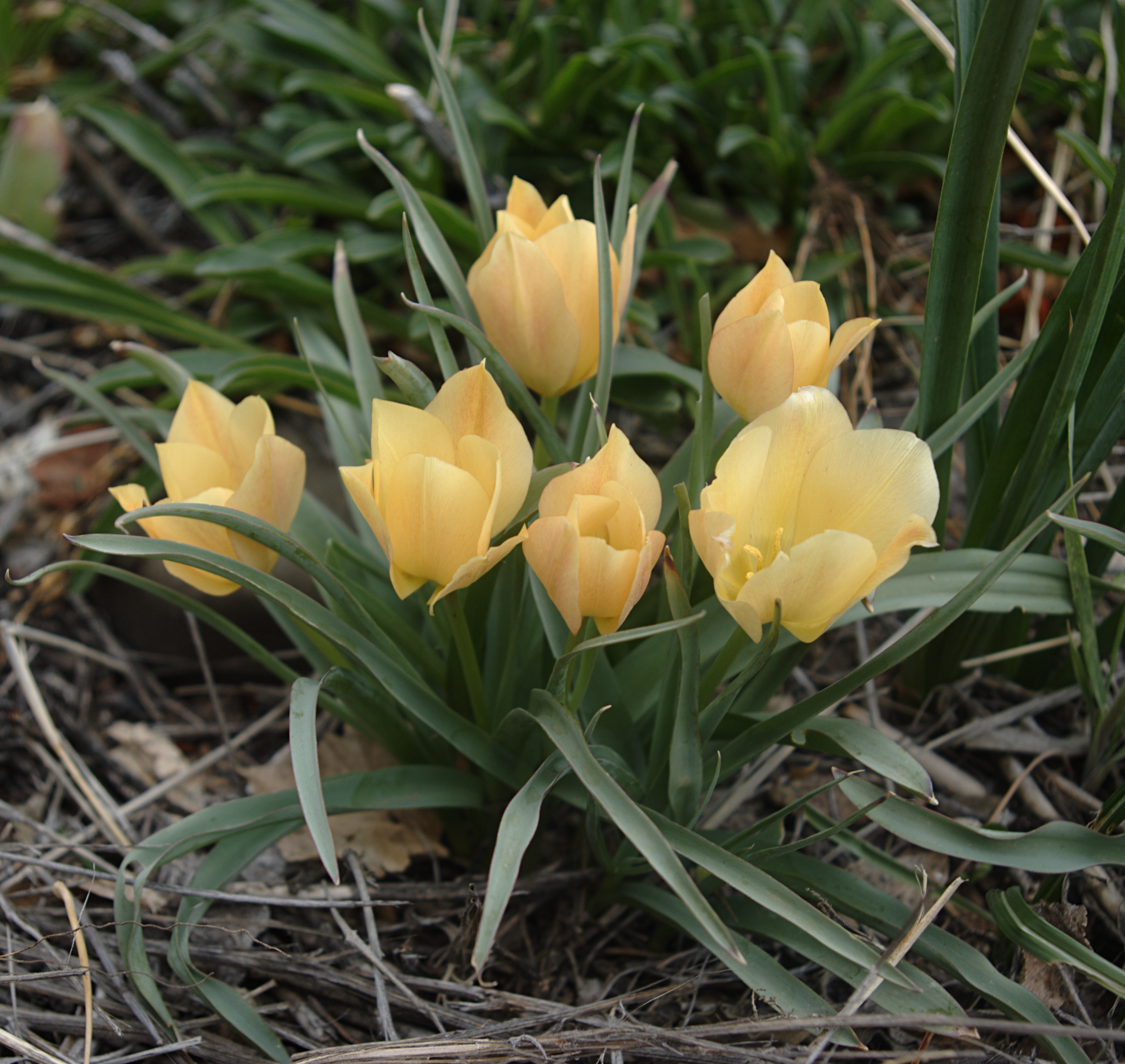
'Bright Gem'

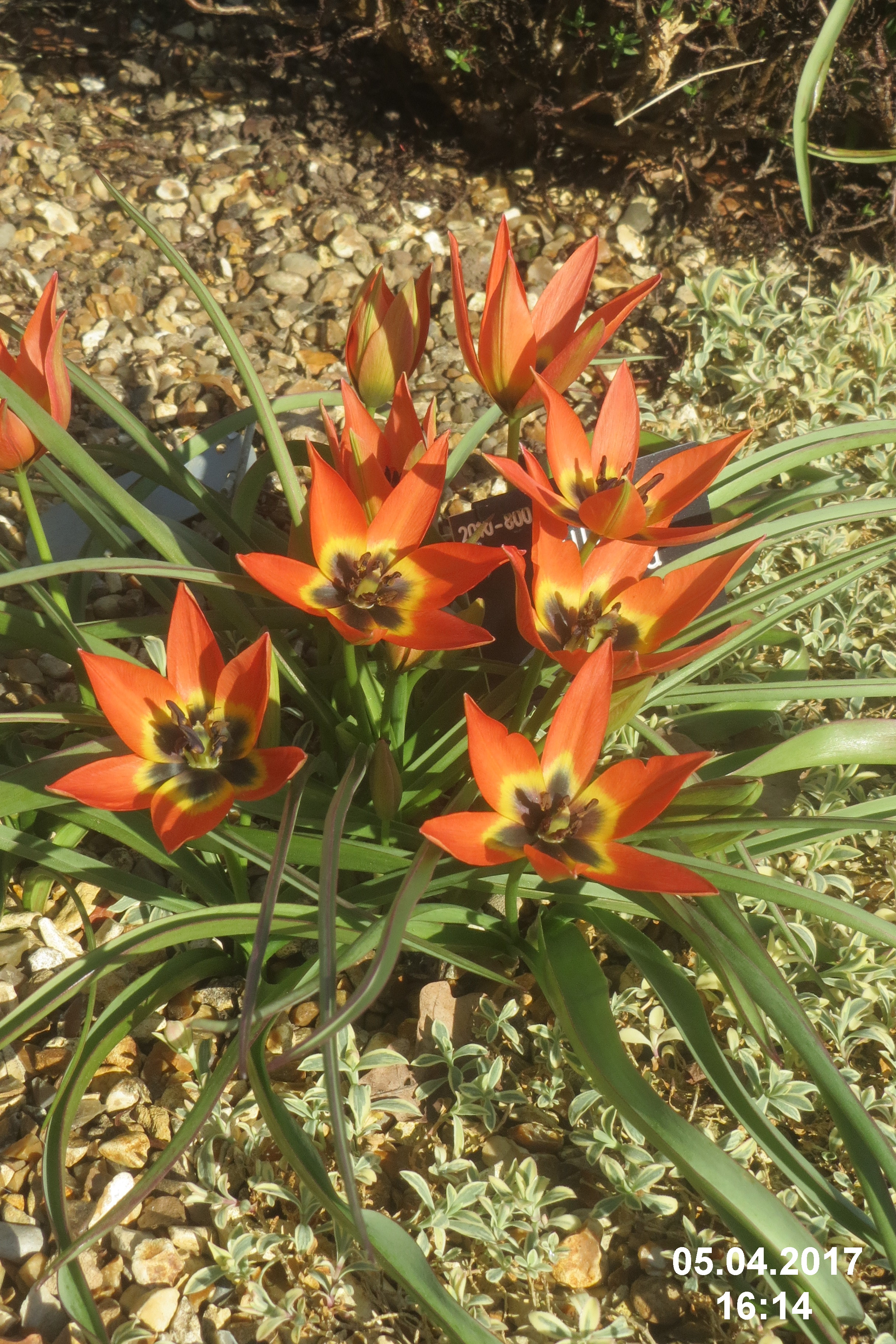
'Little Princess'
