= Alexei Ivanovich Vvedensky =

Russian botanist (1898–1972)

- Born: 23 February 1898; Penza, Russia
- Died: 1972 (74 years)
- Other names: Aleksei Vvedensky, Aleksey Ivanovich Vvedensky
- Scientific career
- Fields: Botany
- Workplaces: National University of Uzbekistan
- Author abbrev. (botany): Vved.

Alexei Ivanovich Vvedensky (Russian: Алексей Иванович Введенский) was a Russian botanist.

In 1947, botanist Yevgeni Korovin published Vvedenskya, which is a genus of flowering plants from Uzbekistan belonging to the family Apiaceae and it was named in Alexei Ivanovich Vvedensky's honour.

446 names of plant species have been published by Vvedensky.

The standard author abbreviation Vved. is used to indicate this person as the author when citing a botanical name.

== Other sources ==
- A.A. Fedorov, 1971, "Floristics in the USSR", BioScience, 21(11): 515
- D.G. Frodin, 2001, Guide to Standard Floras of the World: 685.
