= Wildlife of Chechnya =

Flora and fauna of Chechnya

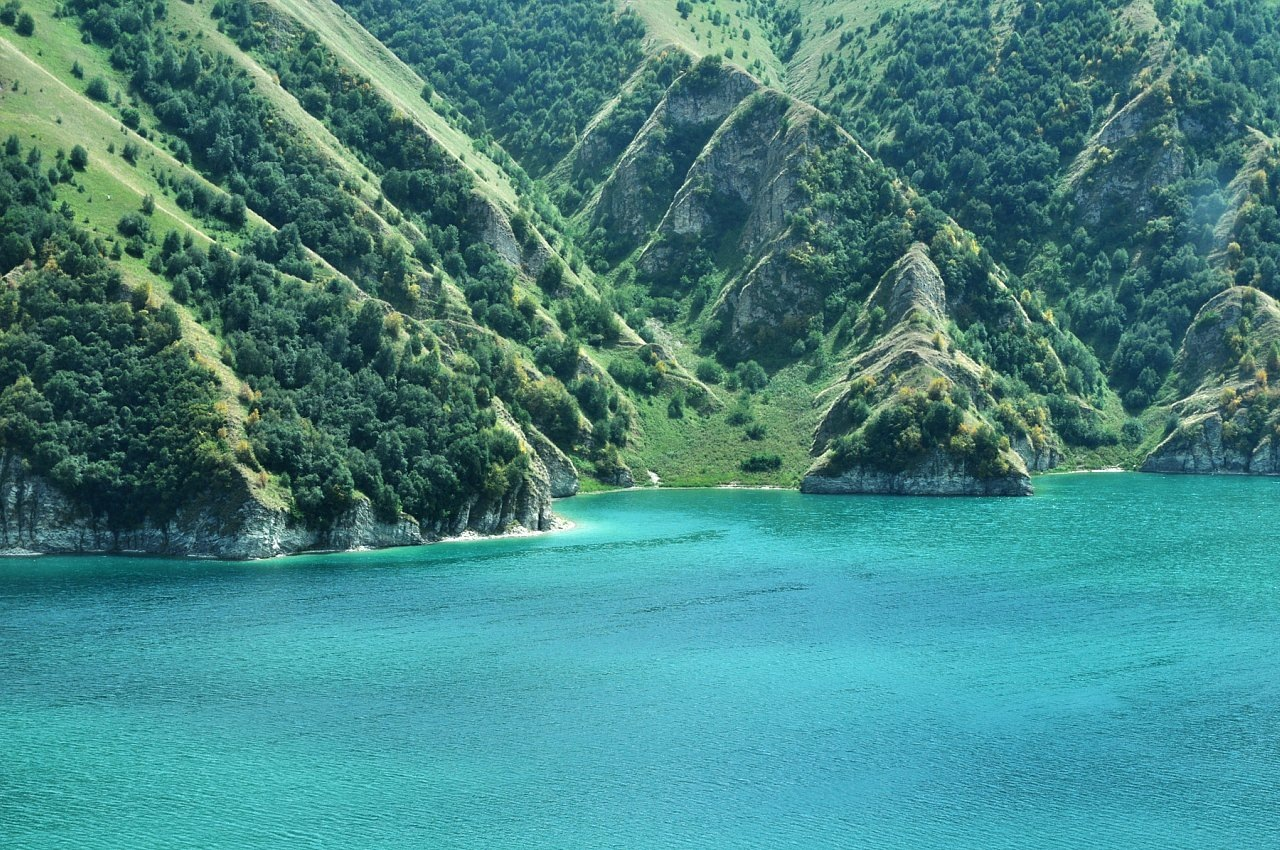
Lake Kezenoyam.

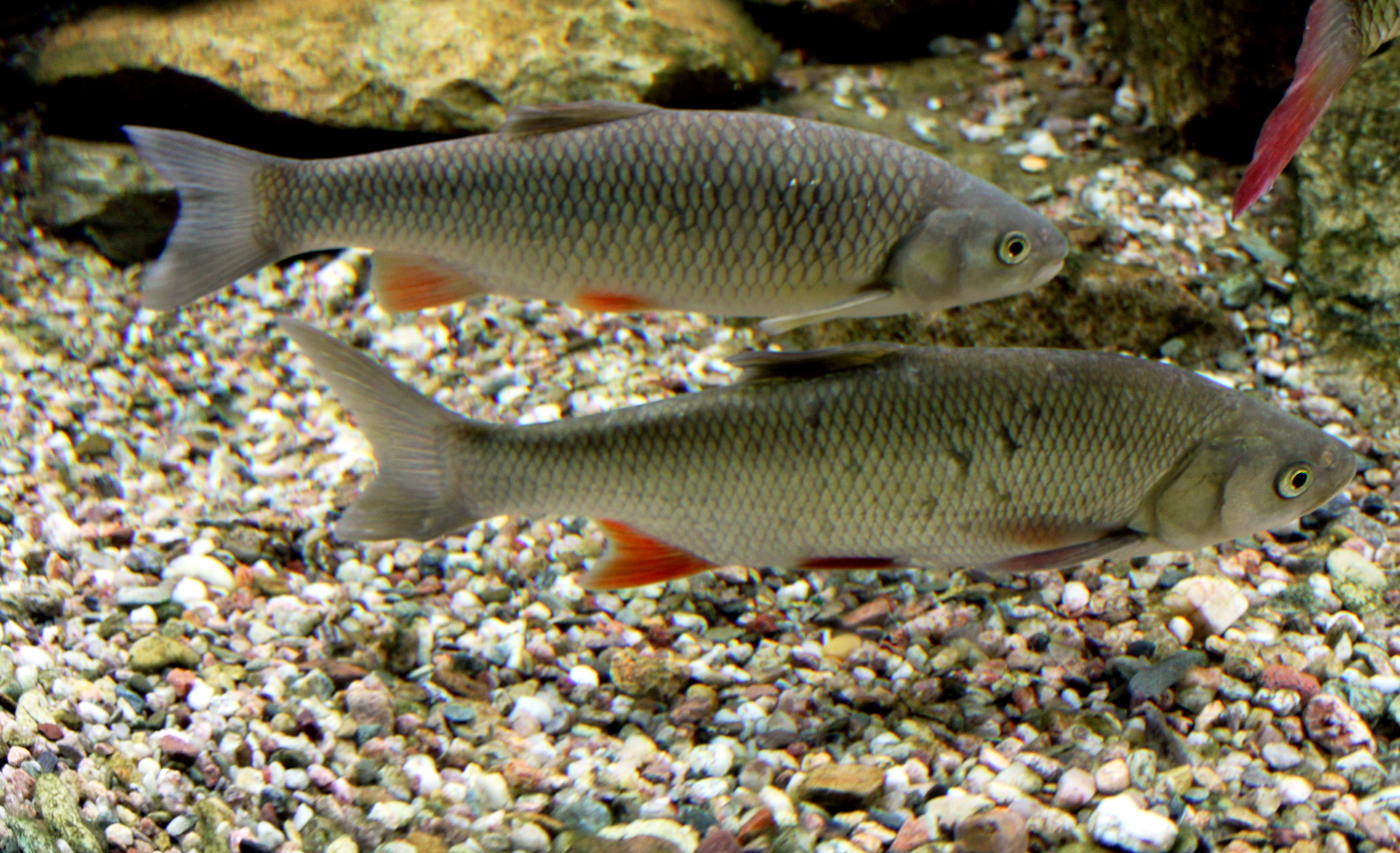
European chub, an invasive species

The wildlife of Chechnya includes a range of flora, fauna, and funga as reflected by its varying topographic and climatic conditions, with the Greater Caucasus to the south, the foreland zone the Terek and Sunza river valleys in the west and east, and the rolling plains of Nogai steppe in the north. Lake Kezenoyam in Chechnya is near the border with Dagestan and can sustain plankton growth. Salmo ezenami, a rare species of trout now critically endangered due to introduction of the invasive species European chub (Squalius cephalus), is native only to this lake and is therefore endemic to Lake Kezenoyam.

About twenty percent of Chechnya is covered by beech, birch, hornbeam and oak forest. In the north, desert and semi-desert vegetation is noted, including sagebrush, saltwort and feather-grass. Acorns, wild fruits, berry bushes, medicinal herbs and mushrooms are recorded on the left bank of the Terek River. Deciduous forests are noted at elevations of 1,800 to 2,000 metres (5,900 to 6,600 ft), while sub-alpine and alpine meadows are noted at higher elevations. In the Terek–Kuma Lowland, there are approximately 50 species of mammals and 150 types of birds.

== Geography ==
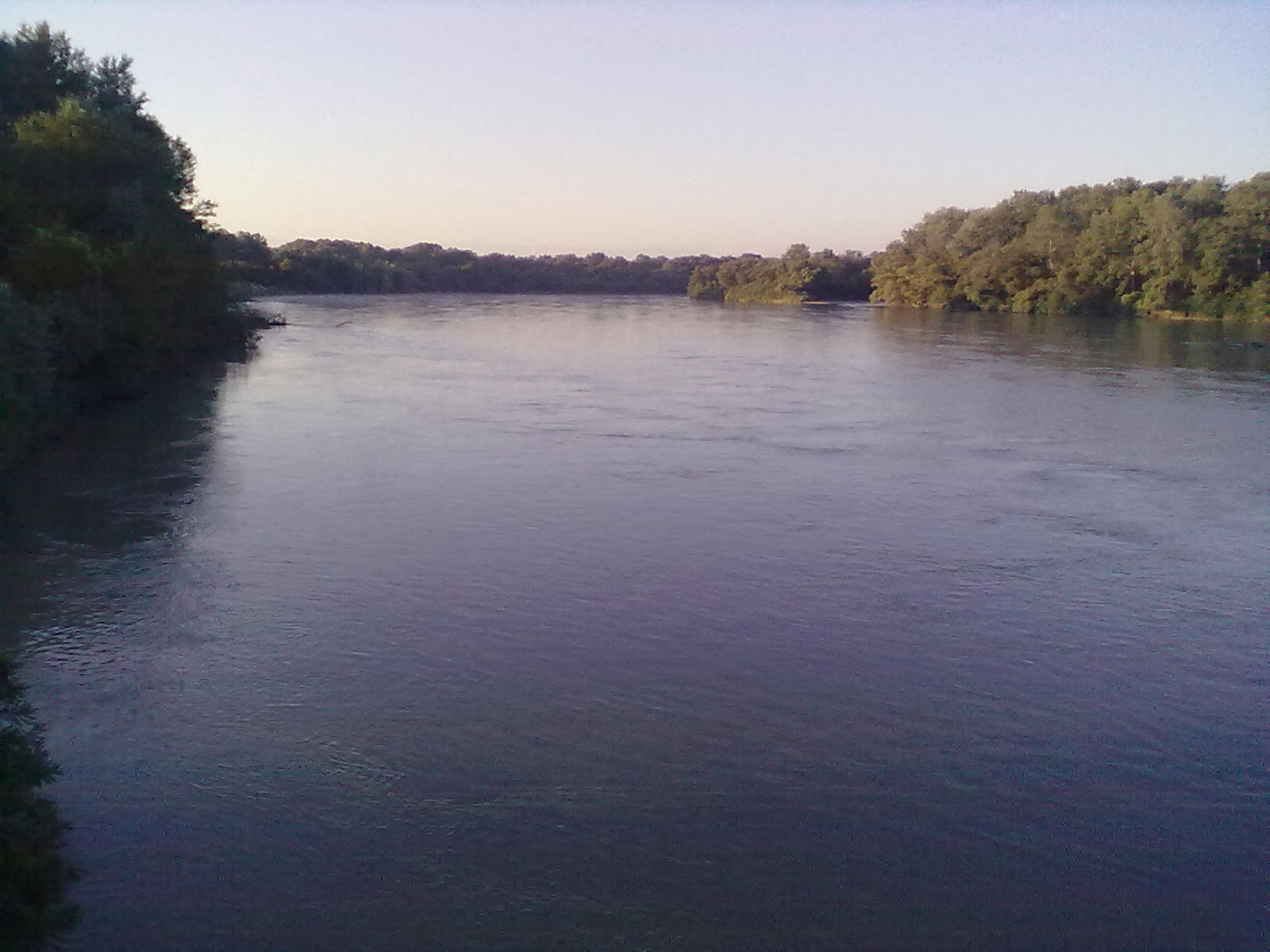
Terek River border between Chechnya and Dagestan

The terrain of Chechnya, which is landlocked, is distinctly marked by of four zones - the northern plains, the Terek Zanzua ridges, the Chechen plains and the Caucasus Mountains to the south.

The major rivers which drain the country are the Terek, the Sunzha, the Argun and the Assa, rise in the glaciers covered high hills and form the main Terek basin. There are few other rivers also. The Terek and the Sunzha Rivers flows across the country from west to the east forming broad valleys which forms the foreland region of the country. The highest mountain is Tebulosmta with an elevation of 14,741 feet (4,493 metres), and the Argun river rises here and joins the Sunzha River. The undulating plains of the Nogay Steppe are in the northern part of the country.

The habitats are in the mountain ridges, valleys and depressions which form about 33% of the total area of the country. The balance of the area is formed of plains interspersed with highlands. A strip of mountains occupies the entire the southern part of the country and is spread over a hilly area 30–50 km wide.

The Terek-Kuma semi desert has dry climate. The Bokovoy Ridges, which are covered with snow, has a cold and humid climate. Accordingly, the semi desert lowland zone experiences an average temperature of -3 °C in January and 25 °C in July while the highlands (mountain region) experience a low of -12 °C in January and a high of 21 °C in July. The average annual precipitation is reported as 300–1,000 mm.

== Protected areas ==
Chechnya has a number of protected areas that vary in extent from 12,000 to 100,000 ha. One of Chechnya's largest reserves is the Shatoi Reserve, which includes more than 20,000 hectares of forest land; it adjoins the Vedeno Reserve. The reserve lies between the Chanti-Argun and Sharo-Argun Rivers. The dominant vegetation consists of valuable trees, and berry bushes, nut trees, herbal plants (medicinal and melliferous) and also mushrooms.

Other reserves include the Urus-Martan, Shali, and Argun reserves.

== Flora ==
The vegetation in the country consists of semi-desertic sagebrush species in the Nogai Steppe, which also has no vegetation in its sand dunes. Feather-grass steppe and chestnut species are found in black earth soils and in the Terek River and Sunzha River regions, with beech, hornbeam, and oak forming broad-leaved dense forests on the mountain slopes. Above 6,500 feet, the vegetation type changes to coniferous forests succeeded by alpine meadows at further higher elevations. Other plant species noted in the country are yew-trees, pine, apple, cherry, pear, berry, wild strawberry, and ramsons.

== Fauna ==
Animals in Chechnya include brown bears (500), wolves (1100), Eurasian lynx (a few), foxes (1300), jackals (1200), bezoar ibexes, Eastern Caucasian tur, European wildcats, chamois, roe deer, wild boar, otters, raccoons, martens, hares, moles, ermines, and grass snakes.

=== Avifauna ===
242 species of birds have been reported in Chechnya, of which three (the red-breasted goose, white-winged lark, and black lark) are breeding endemics, 10 are globally endangered, and one (the yellow-browed warbler) is introduced. The endangered species are:

- Vanellus gregarius, sociable plover (CR)
- Branta ruficollis, red-breasted goose (EN)
- Oxyura leucocephala, white-headed duck (EN)
- Neophron percnopterus, Egyptian vulture (EN)
- Anser erythropus, lesser white-fronted goose (VU)
- Marmaronetta angustirostris, marbled teal (VU)
- Pelecanus crispus, Dalmatian pelican (VU)
- Clanga clanga, greater spotted eagle (VU)
- Aquila heliaca, eastern imperial eagle (VU)
- Otis tarda, great bustard (VU)

== Gallery ==
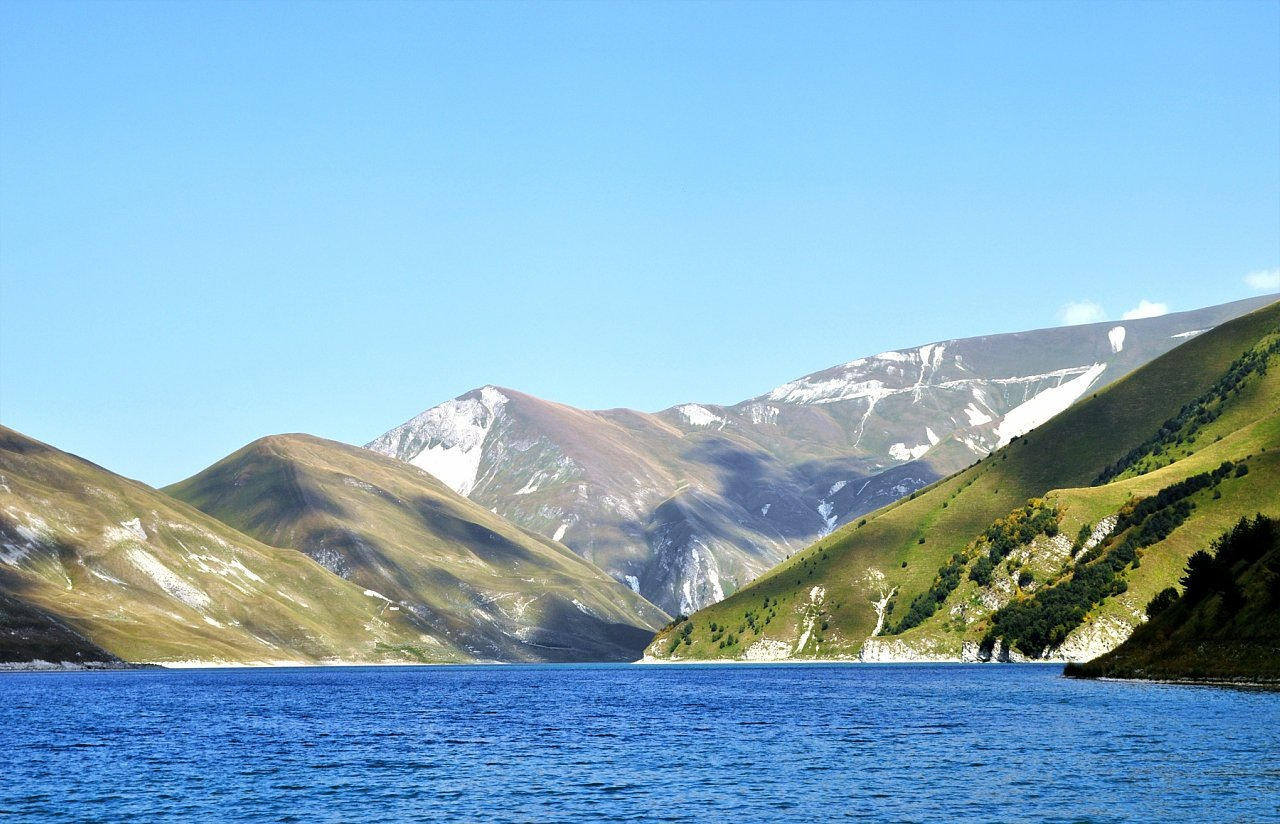
Lake Kezenoy

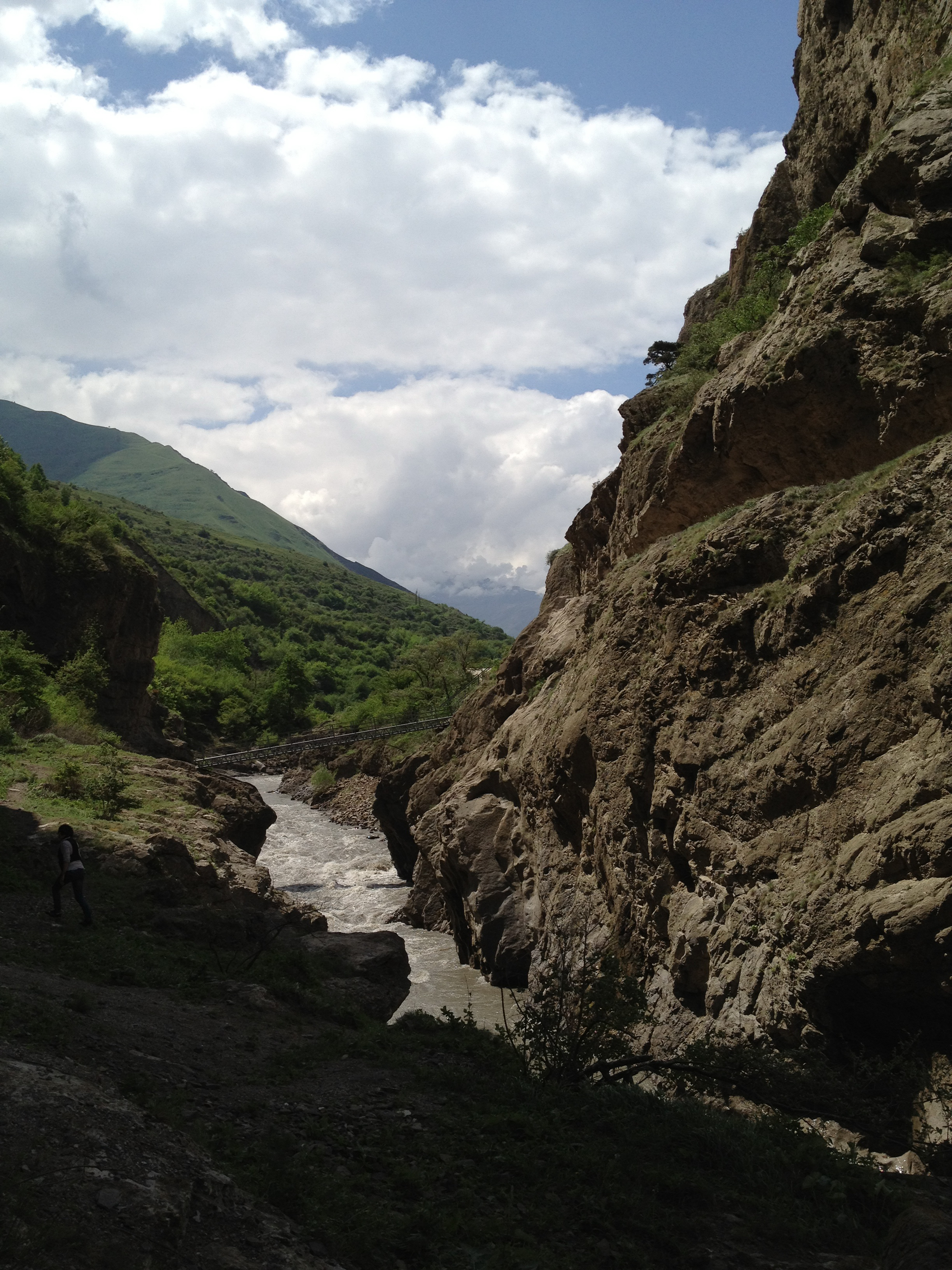
Terek River in Russia
