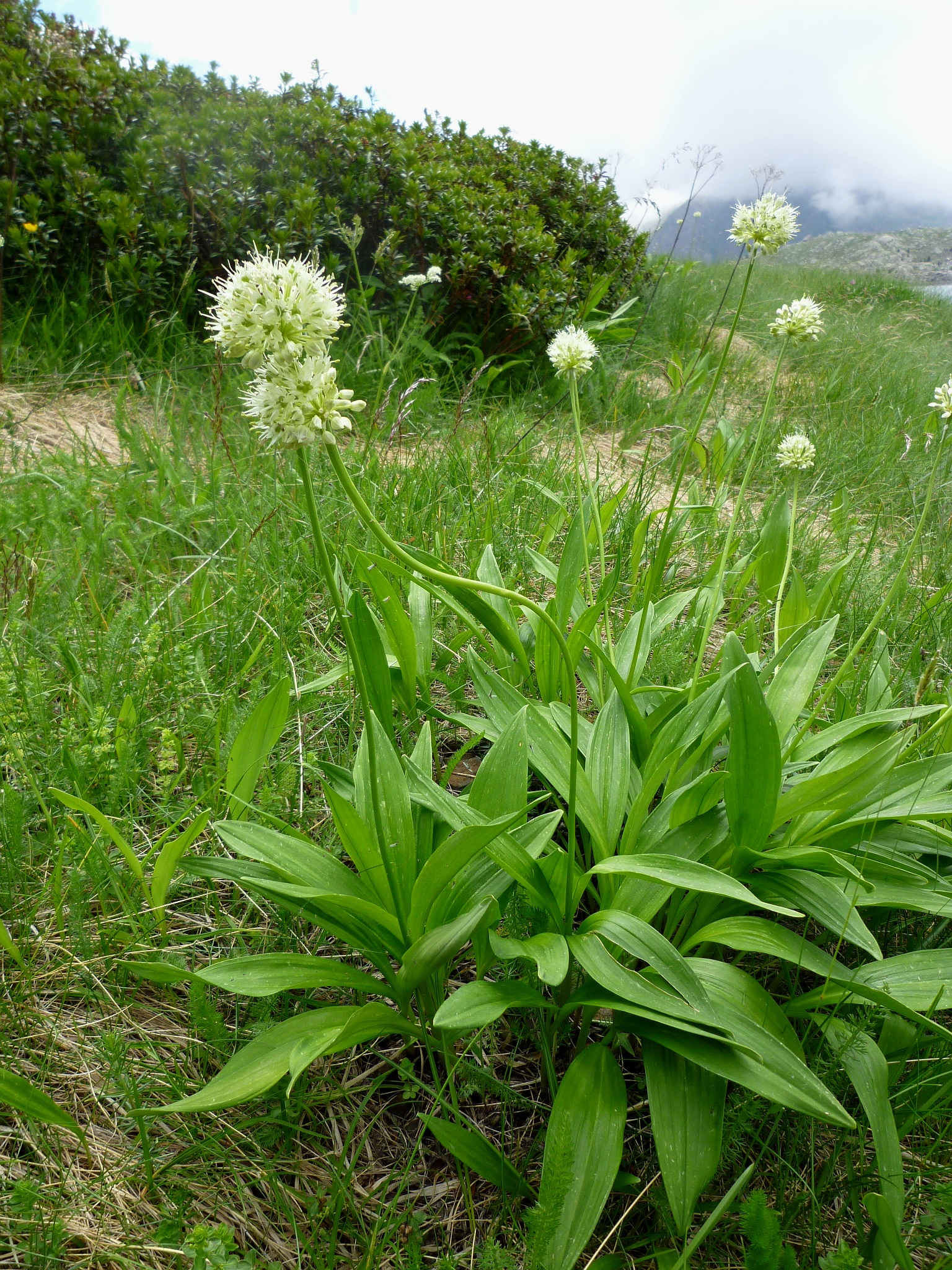

Conservation status
- Least Concern (IUCN 3.1)

Scientific classification
- Kingdom: Plantae
- Clade: Tracheophytes
- Clade: Angiosperms
- Clade: Monocots
- Order: Asparagales
- Family: Amaryllidaceae
- Subfamily: Allioideae
- Genus: Allium
- Subgenus: A. subg. Anguinum
- Species: A. victorialis

Binomial name
- Allium victorialis L. Sp. Pl. 1: 295. 1753

Synonyms
- Synonymy: Cepa victorialis (L.) Moench; Loncostemon victoriale (L.) Raf.; Geboscon lanceolatum Raf.; Geboscon triphylum Raf.; Berenice victorialis (L.) Salisb.; Anguinum victorialis (L.) Fourr.; Caloscordum victorialis (L.) Banfi & Galasso; Allium plantagineum Lam.; Allium convallarifolium Pall. ex Ledeb.; Allium plantaginense Willk. & Lange; Allium longibulbum Dulac; Allium reticulatum St.-Lag. 1880, illegitimate homonym not J. Presl & C. Presl 1819; Allium anguinum Bubani.

= Allium victorialis =

Species of flowering plant

Allium victorialis, commonly known as victory onion, Alpine leek, and Alpine broad-leaf allium is a broad-leaved Eurasian species of wild onion. It is a perennial of the Amaryllis family that occurs widely in mountainous regions of Europe (including Caucasus) and parts of Asia (Himalayas).

Some authors consider certain East Asian and Alaskan populations as constituting subspecies platyphyllum within the species Allium victorialis. Recent sources recognize this group as a distinct species, called Allium ochotense.

== General description ==
Allium victorialis attains a height of 30–45 cm (11.8–17.7 in) and forms a sheathed bulb ("root-stalk") about the thickness of a finger and 5–8 cm (2.0–3.1 in) long. Leaves are broad, elliptical or lanceolate. Flowers (perianths) are whitish green.

== Distribution ==
Allium victorialis is found widely across mountain ranges Europe, as well as the Caucasus and the Himalayas.

== Nomenclature ==
The specific epithet victorialis comes from the German Siegwurz (Root of Victory), and it earned this name having been "worn as an amulet, to be as safeguard against the attacks of certain impure spirits," by Bohemian miners among others.

== Uses ==
The plant, in past centuries in certain mountainous regions of Europe, "was cultivated as a medicinal and fetish plant". The plant known as pukusa to the Ainu people in northern Japan, an important food source, had been classed as A .victorialis subsp. platyphyllum, but recent genetics classify it under its own species, Allium ochotense.

== See also ==
- sansai
- ramsons
- Allium tricoccum (ramps)

== Bibliography ==
- Choi, Hyeok JAE; Oh, Byoung UN (October 2011). "A partial revision of Allium (Amaryllidaceae) in Korea and north-eastern China". Botanical Journal of the Linnean Society. 167 (2): 153–211. doi:10.1111/j.1095-8339.2011.01166.x.
