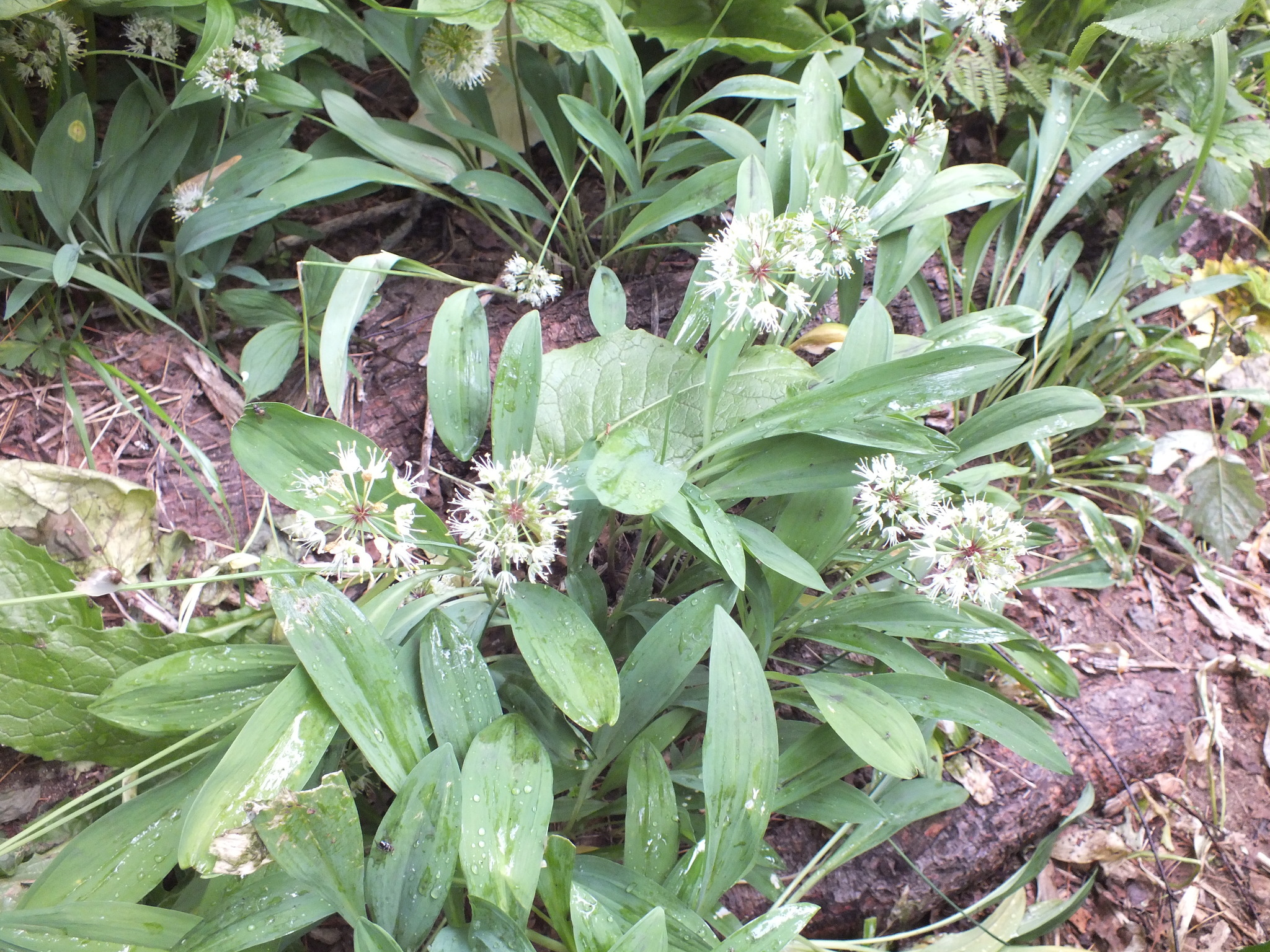
- In bloom on the banks of the Tom River

Scientific classification
- Kingdom: Plantae
- Clade: Tracheophytes
- Clade: Angiosperms
- Clade: Monocots
- Order: Asparagales
- Family: Amaryllidaceae
- Subfamily: Allioideae
- Genus: Allium
- Subgenus: A. subg. Anguinum
- Species: A. microdictyon

Binomial name
- Allium microdictyon Prokh.

= Allium microdictyon =

Species of plant

Allium microdictyon is a species of flowering plant in the family Amaryllidaceae, native to eastern Siberia, Mongolia, Inner Mongolia, Manchuria, Korea, and the southern portions of the Russian Far East. It is very similar to Allium ochotense and is called 'mountain garlic' along with it by Koreans, who consume their leaves as a side dish.
