= Lake Kezenoyam =

Deepest lake in the Caucasus Mountains

Lake Kezenoy-am
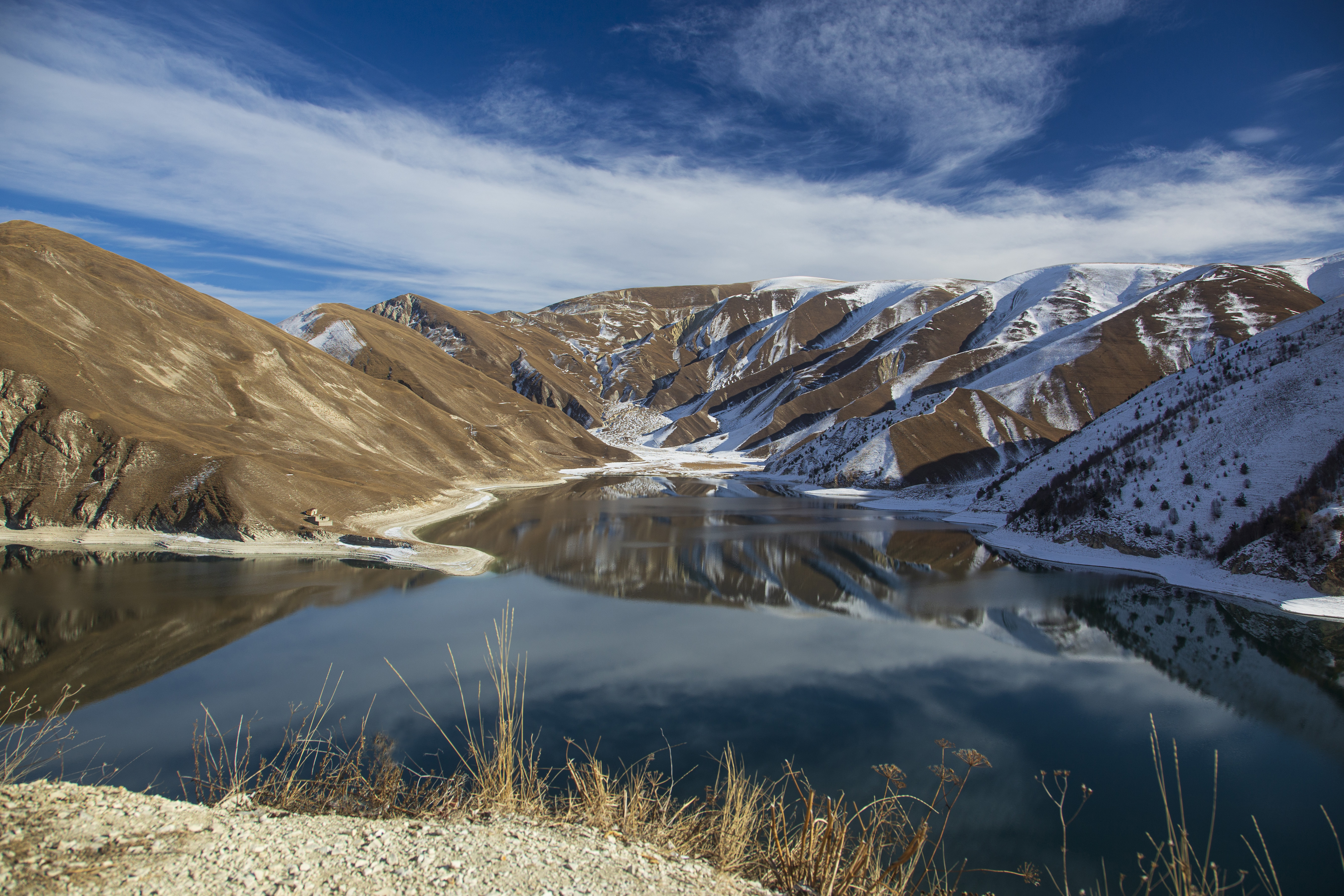

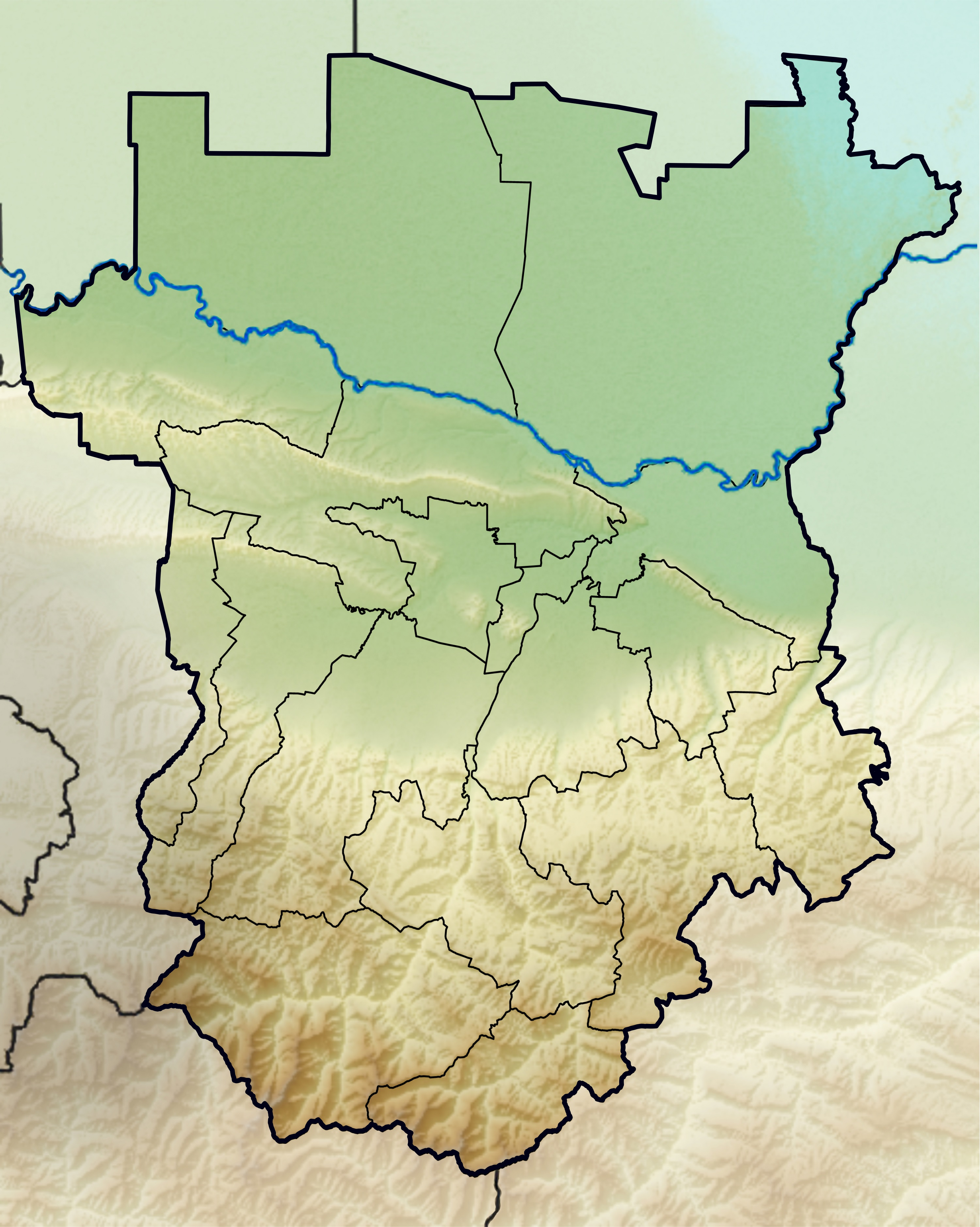
- Location within Chechnya
- Location: Chechnya, Dagestan (Caucasus)
- Coordinates: 42°47′0″N 46°8′0″E
- Type: Alpine/Glacial
- Basin countries: Russia
- Surface area: 2.4 km^{2} (0.93 sq mi)
- Max. depth: 74 m (243 ft)
- Water volume: 1.6 km^{3} (1,300,000 acre⋅ft)
- Surface elevation: 1,870 m (6,140 ft)

Lake Kezenoy-am (Lake Goluboye, Russian: Кезенойам, Голубое; Chechen: Къоьзана Iaм, romanized: Q̇özana Jam) is the deepest lake in the Caucasus Mountains, in the Russian Federation, mostly in Chechnya but partly in Dagestan. It goes through Andiyskiy Khrebet (Andian Ridge). It is situated at an altitude of 1,870 m (6,140 ft) above sea level and covers an area of 2.4 km^{2} (0.93 sq mi). The maximum depth of the lake is 74 m (243 ft). In winter the surface of the lake freezes and in summer the water temperature is around 5 °C (41 °F). The lake water has a year-round supply of oxygen in which plankton survive. Salmo ezenami, a rare species of trout, are native only to the lake; however, their population is threatened with extinction due to the introduction of European chubs (Squalius cephalus) which consume their fry.

== See also ==
- List of lakes of Russia
