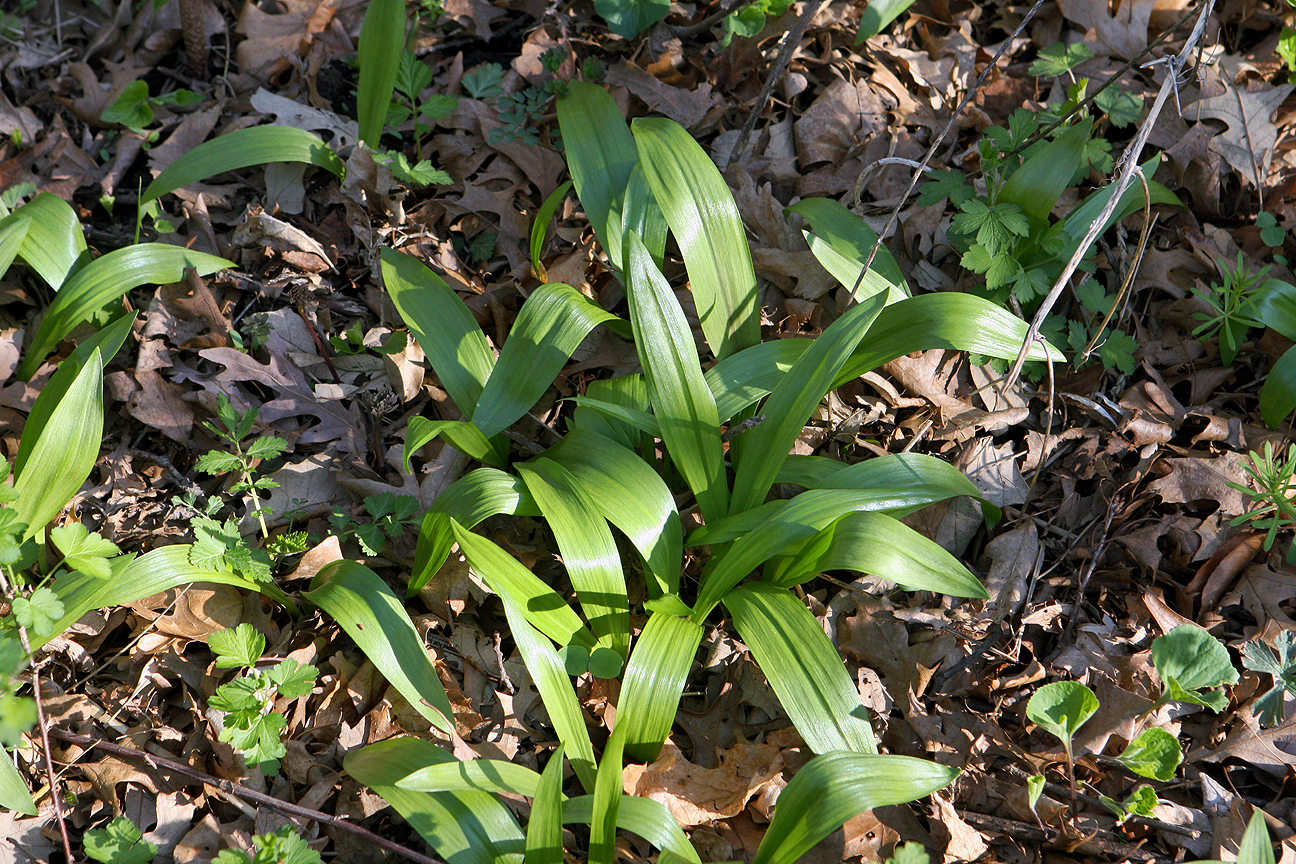
- Leaves (May 5)
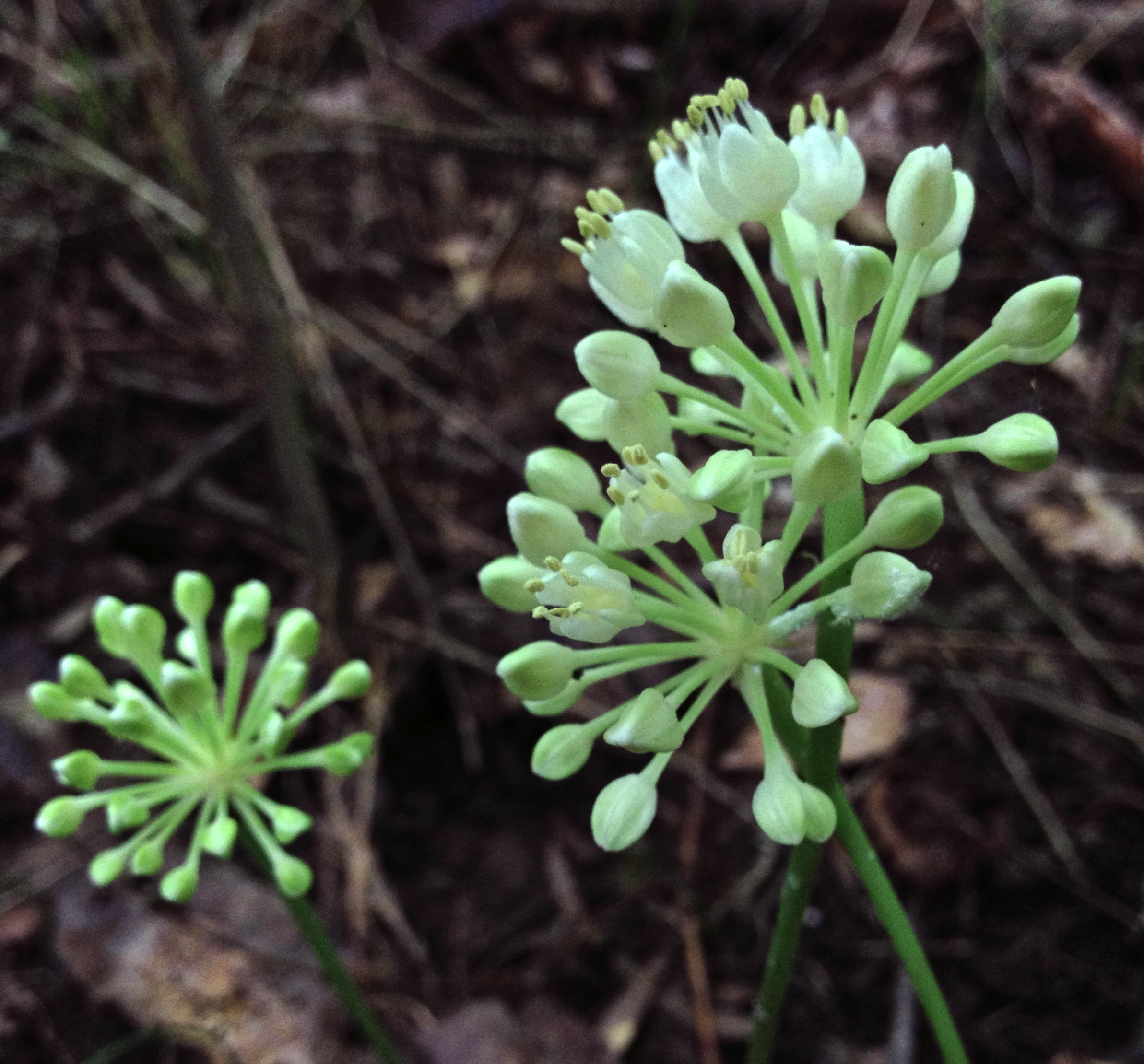
- Flowers and flower buds (June 30)

Scientific classification
- Kingdom: Plantae
- Clade: Tracheophytes
- Clade: Angiosperms
- Clade: Monocots
- Order: Asparagales
- Family: Amaryllidaceae
- Subfamily: Allioideae
- Genus: Allium
- Subgenus: A. subg. Anguinum
- Species: A. tricoccum

Binomial name
- Allium tricoccum Ait. 1789 not Blanco 1837

Synonyms
- Synonymy: Aglitheis tricoccum (Aiton) Raf.; Allium pictum Moldenke; Allium tricoccum f. pictum Moldenke; Allium triflorum Raf.; Ophioscorodon tricoccon (Aiton) Wallr.; Validallium tricoccum (Aiton) Small; Allium burdickii (Hanes) A.G.Jones

= Allium tricoccum =

Ramp

Species of wild onion

Allium tricoccum (commonly known as ramps, ramson, wild leek, wood leek, or wild garlic) is a bulbous perennial flowering plant in the amaryllis family Amaryllidaceae. It is a North American species of wild onion or garlic found in eastern North America. Many of the common English names for this plant are also used for other Allium species, particularly the similar Allium ursinum, which is native to Eurasia. An edible plant, Allium tricoccum is used in a variety of North American and indigenous cuisines, and has also been used by Native Americans in traditional medicine. A French rendering (chicagou) of a Miami–Illinois name for this plant is the namesake of the American city of Chicago.

== Description ==
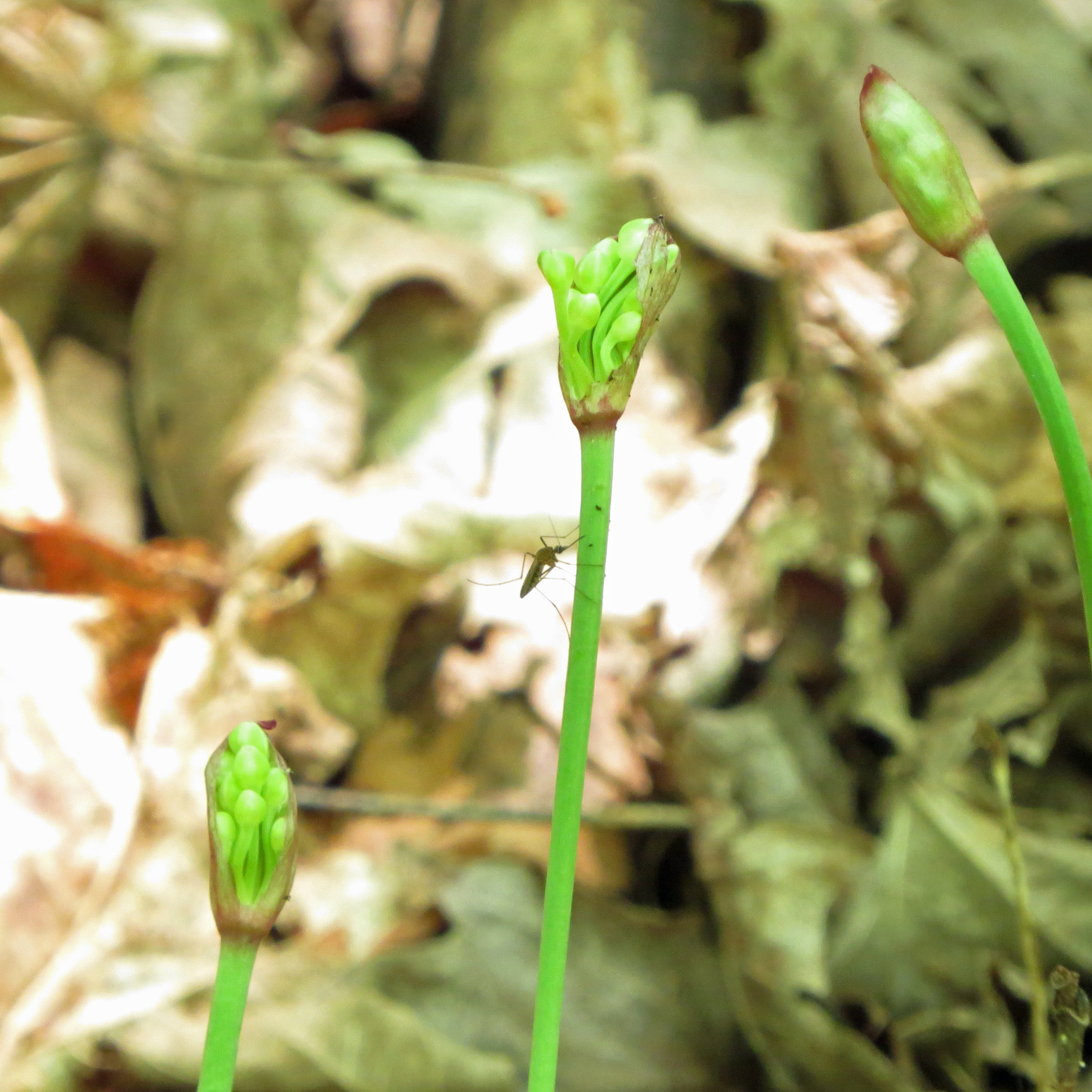
Allium tricoccum with open inflorescence bud (June 6)

Allium tricoccum is a perennial growing from an ovoid-conical shaped bulb that is 2–6 cm (1–2 in) long. Plants typically produce a cluster of 2–6 bulbs that give rise to broad, flat, smooth, light green leaves, that are 20–30 cm (8–12 in) long including the narrow petioles, often with deep purple or burgundy tints on the lower stems. The bulbs are white and surrounded by brownish to grayish sheathing. Each cluster of bulbs gives rise to one flowering stem. The flowers are arranged into an umbel that has an erect scape that is typically 10–40 cm (4–16 in) long. The inflorescence has two ovate bracts that enclose the flowers before they open and fall away at anthesis. The flowering stem is persistent after fruiting. The flowering most commonly occurs after the leaves have died back, unlike the similar Allium ursinum, in which leaves and flowers can be seen at the same time. Ramps grow in close groups strongly rooted just beneath the surface of the soil. Flowering occurs in June or July into August. The flowers have white, cream or yellowish tepals which are 4–7 mm (1/8–1/4 in) long. The stamens are about as tall as the tepals and the filaments of the stamens have widened bases and are inserted on the corolla. After flowering and fertilization green fruits are produced that are three-lobed and open by way of three valves. The seeds are round, black, and shiny.

== Taxonomy ==
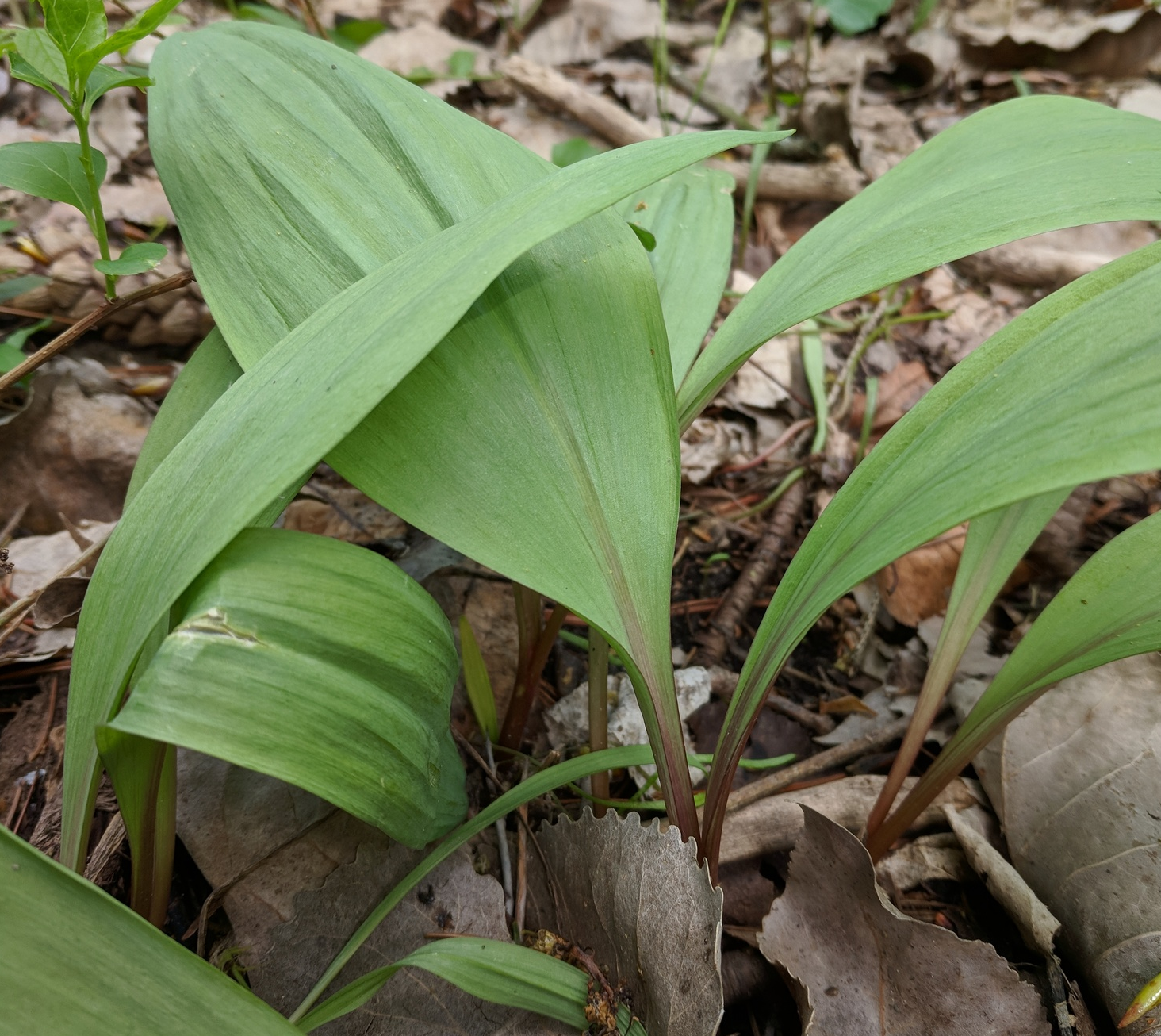
Allium tricoccum var. tricoccum with wide leaves and red pigment

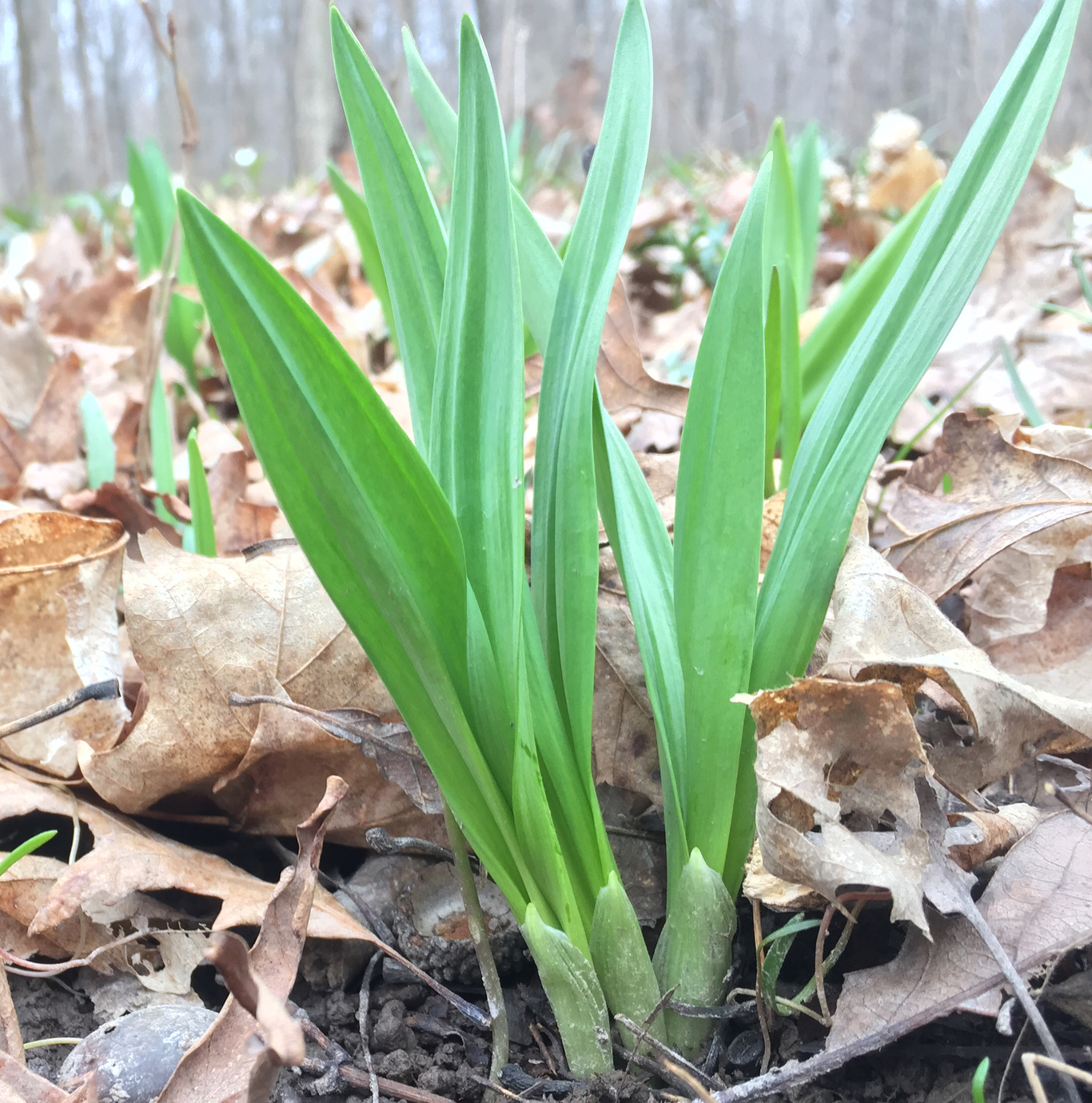
Allium tricoccum var. burdickii with narrow leaves and no pigment

Allium tricoccum was first named as such in 1789 by the Scottish botanist William Aiton, in Hortus Kewensis, a catalog of plants cultivated in London's Kew botanic garden. The species had been introduced to Britain in 1770. The specific epithet tricoccum refers to the possession of three seeds.

=== Varieties ===
As of November 2018, Kew's Plants of the World Online accepted two varieties:

- Allium tricoccum var. tricoccum
- Allium tricoccum var. burdickii Hanes—narrow-leaf ramps, white ramps, Chicago leek, Burdick's leek

This treatment is followed by other sources, although the two taxa are frequently treated as two species, Allium tricoccum and Allium burdickii. A. tricoccum var. burdickii was first described by Clarence Robert Hanes in 1953; the epithet burdickii is in honor of Justin Herbert Burdick (1851–1939), a Midwestern physician and manufacturer who pointed out differences between what were then regarded as different "races" in letters to Asa Gray. The variety was raised to a full species by Almut Gitter Jones in 1979.

The two varieties are distinguished by several features. A. tricoccum var. tricoccum is generally larger than A. tricoccum var. burdickii: the bulbs are larger, the leaves are usually 5–9 cm (2–3 1/2 in) wide rather than 2–4 cm (1–1 1/2 in) wide and the umbels typically have 30–50 flowers rather than 12–18. Additionally, the leaf stalks (petioles) and leaf sheaths are usually red or purplish in var. tricoccum and white in var. burdickii. The leaves of var. burdickii also have less distinct stalks than those of var. tricoccum.

== Distribution and habitat ==
The species is widespread across eastern Canada and the eastern United States.

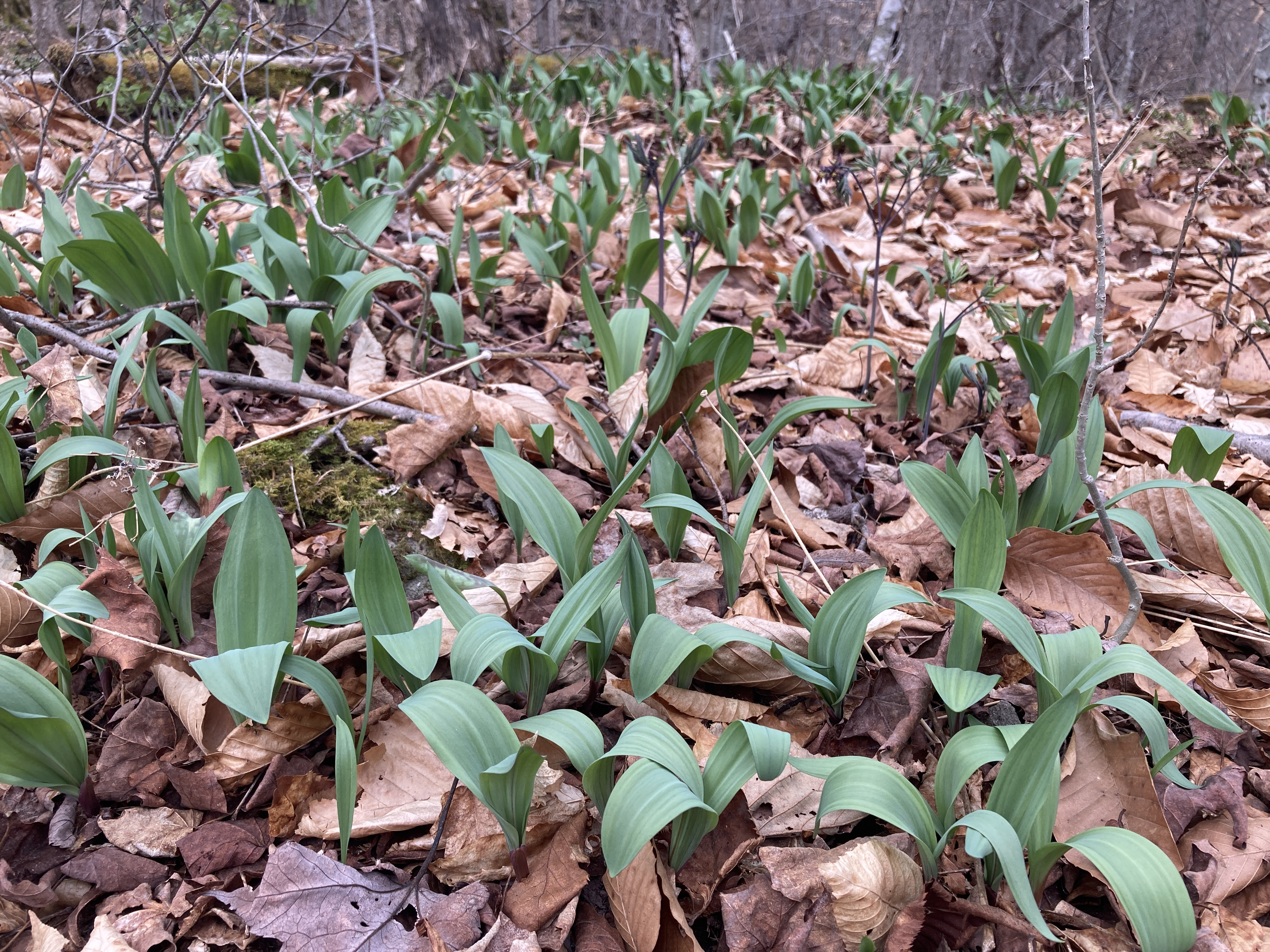
Ramps growing on the forest floor in the Catskills region of New York state

Allium tricoccum var. tricoccum is found in woods with rich soils with moist ground in depressions, and along streamside bluffs, and on colluvial slopes. Allium tricoccum var. burdickii is found growing in dry soils of upland woods.

== Conservation ==
In Canada, ramps are considered rare delicacies. Since the growth of ramps is not as widespread there as in Appalachia and because of human activity, ramps are a threatened species in Quebec. Allium tricoccum is a protected species under Quebec legislation. A person may have ramps in his or her possession outside the plant's natural environment, or may harvest it for the purposes of personal consumption in an annual quantity not exceeding 50 bulbs or 50 plants, provided those activities do not take place in a park within the jurisdiction of the National Parks Act. The protected status also prohibits any commercial transactions of ramps; this prevents restaurants from serving ramps as is done in the United States. Failure to comply with these laws is punishable by a fine. However, the law does not always stop poachers, who find a ready market across the border in Ontario (especially in the Ottawa area), where ramps may be legally harvested and sold.

Ramps are considered a species of "special concern" for conservation in Maine, Rhode Island, and commercially exploited in Tennessee.

== Uses ==
Allium tricoccum is popular in the cuisines of the rural uplands of its native region. Both the white lower leaf stalks and the broad green leaves are edible. It is regarded as an early spring vegetable with a strong garlic-like odor and a pronounced onion flavor. Ramps also have a growing popularity in restaurants throughout North America.

The plant's flavor, a combination of onions and strong garlic, is adaptable to numerous cooking styles. In central Appalachia, ramps are most commonly fried with potatoes in bacon fat or scrambled with eggs and served with bacon, pinto beans and cornbread. Ramps can also be pickled or used in soups and other foods in place of onions and garlic.

=== By Native Americans ===
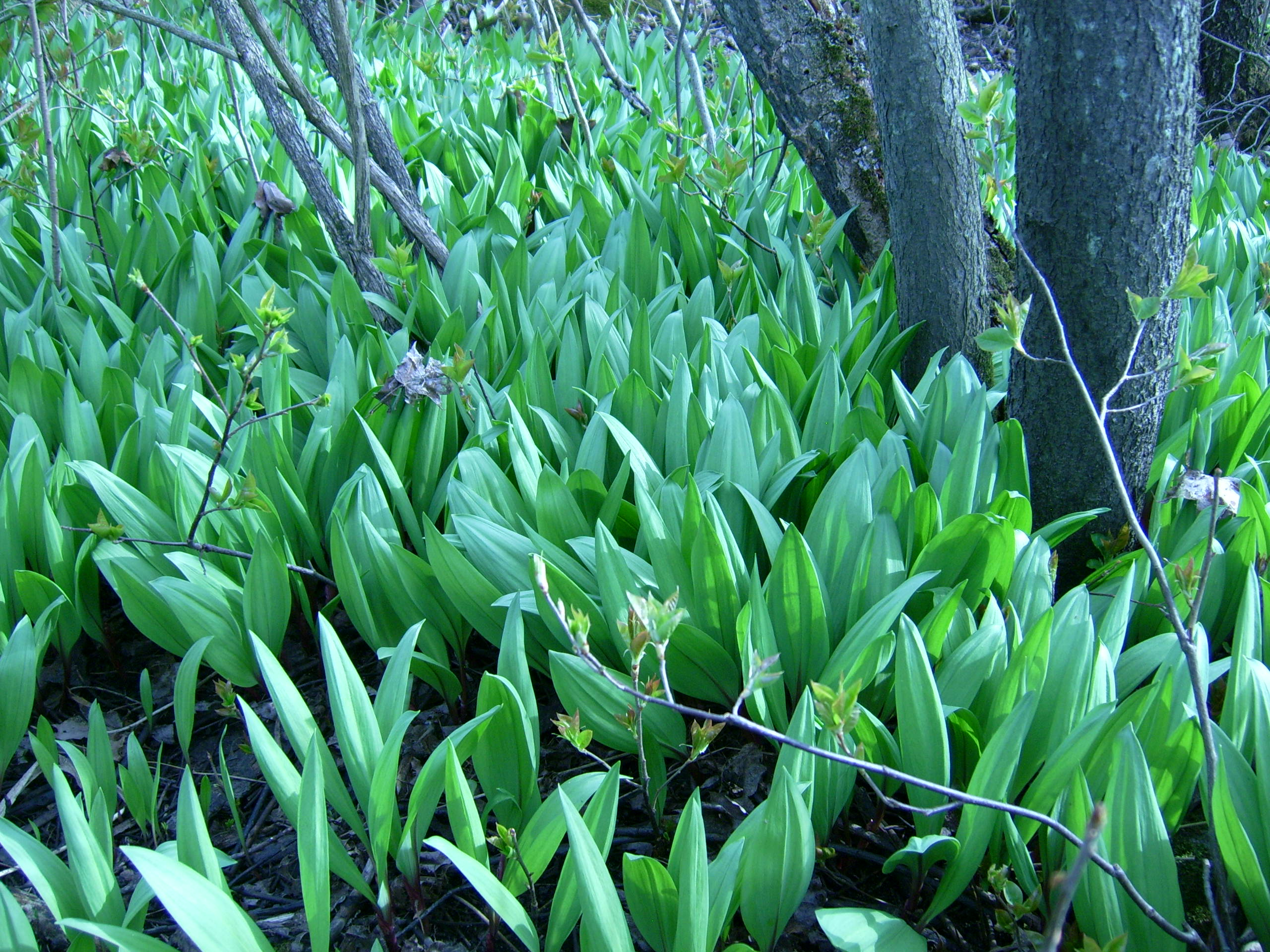
Ramps at Whitefish Island, Batchewana First Nation

The Menominee, Cherokee, Haudenosaunee, Potawatomi and Ojibwa all consume the plant in their traditional cuisines. The Menominee call it pekuac-sekākūhsyah. It was gathered in the woodlands to the south of Lake Michigan.

The Cherokee eat the plant as a spring tonic, for colds and for croup. They also use the warm juice for earaches. The Ojibwa use a decoction as a quick-acting emetic. The Haudenosaunee use a decoction of the root to treat worms in children, and as a spring tonic to "clean you out". Some Native Americans used juice from the crushed bulbs to treat insect stings.

== In culture ==
The city Chicago received its name from a dense growth of ramps near Lake Michigan in Illinois Country observed in the 17th century. The Chicago River was referred to by the plant's indigenous name, according to explorer Robert Cavelier, sieur de La Salle, and by his comrade, the naturalist and diarist Henri Joutel. The plant, called shikaakwa (chicagou) in the Miami-Illinois language spoken by the local indigenous people, was once thought to be Allium cernuum, the nodding wild onion, but research in the early 1990s showed the correct plant was the ramp.

The ramp has strong associations with the folklore of the central Appalachian Mountains. Fascination and humor have fixated on the plant's extreme pungency. Jim Comstock, editor and co-owner of the Richwood News Leader, introduced ramp juice into the printer's ink of one issue as a practical joke, invoking the ire of the U.S. Postmaster General.

The inhabitants of Appalachia have long celebrated spring with the arrival of the ramp, believing it to be a tonic capable of warding off many winter ailments. Indeed, ramp's vitamin and mineral content did bolster the health of people who went without many green vegetables during the winter.

=== Common name ===
According to West Virginia University botanist Earl L. Core, the widespread use in southern Appalachia of the term "ramps" (as opposed to "wild leek" which is used in some other parts of the United States) derives from Old English:

The name ramps (usually plural) is one of the many dialectical variants of the English word ramson, a common name of the European bear leek (Allium ursinum), a broad-leaved species of garlic much cultivated and eaten in salads, a plant related to our American species. The Anglo-Saxon ancestor of ramson was hramsa, and ramson was the Old English plural, the –n being retained as in oxen, children, etc. The word is cognate with rams, in German, Danish, Swedish, and Norwegian, and with the Greek kromuon, garlic [...] . Wright's English Dialect Dictionary (1904) lists as variants rame, ramp, ramps, rams, ramsden, ramsey, ramsh, ramsies, ramsy, rommy, and roms, mostly from northern England and Scotland.

=== Food festivals ===
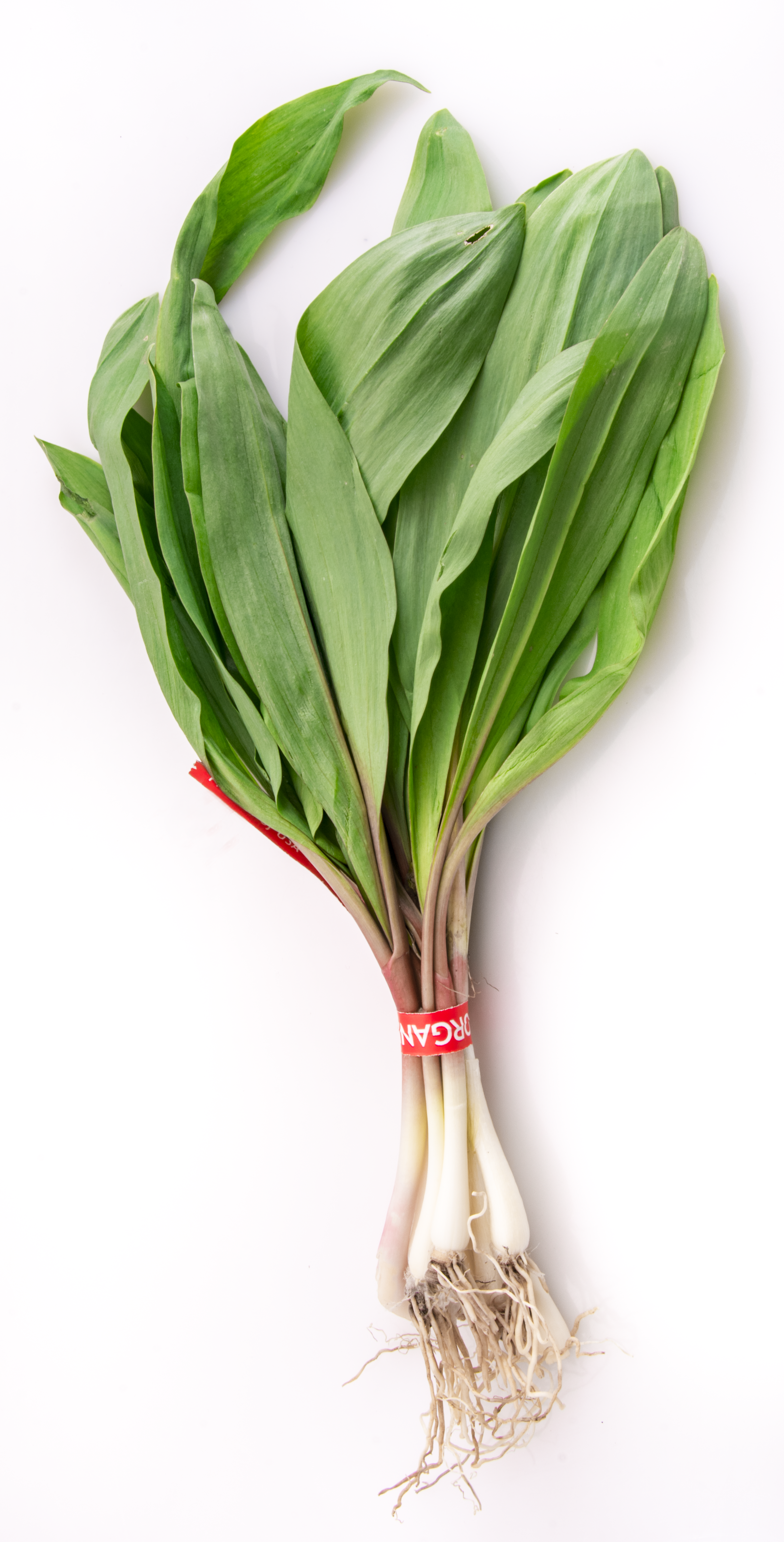
Bunch of ramps

The community of Richwood, West Virginia, holds the annual "Feast of the Ramson" in April. Sponsored by the National Ramp Association, the "Ramp Feed" (as it is locally known) brings thousands of ramp aficionados from considerable distances to sample foods featuring the plant. During the ramp season (late winter through early spring), restaurants in the town serve a wide variety of foods containing ramps. The city of Elkins, West Virginia, hosts the "Ramps and Rails Festival" during the last weekend in April of each year. This festival features a cook-off and ramp-eating contests, and is attended by several hundred people each year. The town of Cosby, Tennessee, bordering Great Smoky Mountains National Park, has held the largest and one of the oldest ramp festivals in the United States, the "Cosby Ramp Festival", on the first weekend in May since 1954. The festival has played host to as many as 30,000 visitors in years past, has been attended by ex-President Harry Truman, and has featured such notable musical acts as Tennessee Ernie Ford, Eddy Arnold, Roy Acuff, Bill Monroe, Minnie Pearl, and Brenda Lee. Besides the food, heritage music, dancing, and adulation of the ramp, each year a young woman is crowned "Maid of Ramps". The community of Flag Pond, Tennessee, hosts its annual Ramp Festival on the second Saturday each May. The festival features a wide variety of ramp-inspired foods, and includes music from an assortment of Appalachian groups. Hundreds of people attend the festival each year. The community of Whitetop, Virginia, holds its annual ramp festival the third weekend in May. It is sponsored by the Mount Rogers volunteer fire department and features local music from Wayne Henderson and other bands, along with a barbecued chicken feast complete with fried potatoes and ramps and local green beans. A ramp-eating contest is held for children and adults. An annual ramp convention in Haywood County, North Carolina, has drawn as many as 4,000 participants a year since its inception circa 1925. The community of Huntington, West Virginia, holds an annual ramp festival referred to as Stink Fest. It is hosted by The Wild Ramp, an indoor farmers market. The Mason-Dixon park in Greene County, Pennsylvania holds an annual ramp festival towards the end of April. There are ramp delicacies, as well as music, crafts, and vendors. The Mason-Dixon Historical Park in Core, West Virginia offers a Ramp Dinner and Wildflower Walk each spring.

== See also ==
- Allium cepa, a type of onion also known as calçot
- Allium ursinum, also known as ramson
- Allium ochotense, also known as Siberian onion, is widely used in many Asian cuisines
- Campanula rapunculus, also known as rampion bellflower
