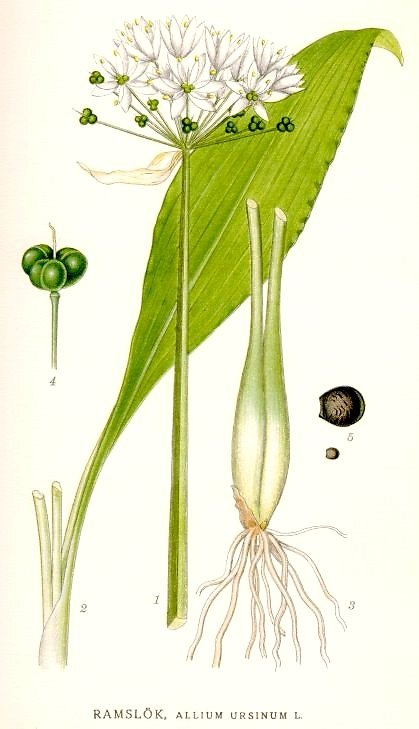

Scientific classification
- Kingdom: Plantae
- Clade: Tracheophytes
- Clade: Angiosperms
- Clade: Monocots
- Order: Asparagales
- Family: Amaryllidaceae
- Subfamily: Allioideae
- Genus: Allium
- Subgenus: A. subg. Amerallium
- Species: A. ursinum

Binomial name
- Allium ursinum L.

Synonyms
- Species synonymy: Aglitheis ursina (L.) Raf.; Allium latifolium Gilib.; Allium longipetiolatum St.-Lag.; Allium nemorale Salisb.; Allium petiolatum Lam.; Allium ucrainicum (Oksner & Kleopow) Bordz.; Allium ursinoides G.Don ex Sweet; Allium ursinum subsp. ucrainicum Oksner & Kleopow; Allium ursinum var. ucrainicum (Oksner & Kleopow) Soó; Allium ursinum subsp. ucrainicum Kleop. & Oxner; Allium vincetoxicum Pall. ex Ledeb.; Cepa ursina (L.) Bernh.; Geboscon ursinum (L.) Raf.; Hylogeton ursinum (L.) Salisb.; Moly latifolium (Gilib.) Gray; Ophioscorodon ursinum (L.) Wallr.

= Allium ursinum =

Species of flowering plant

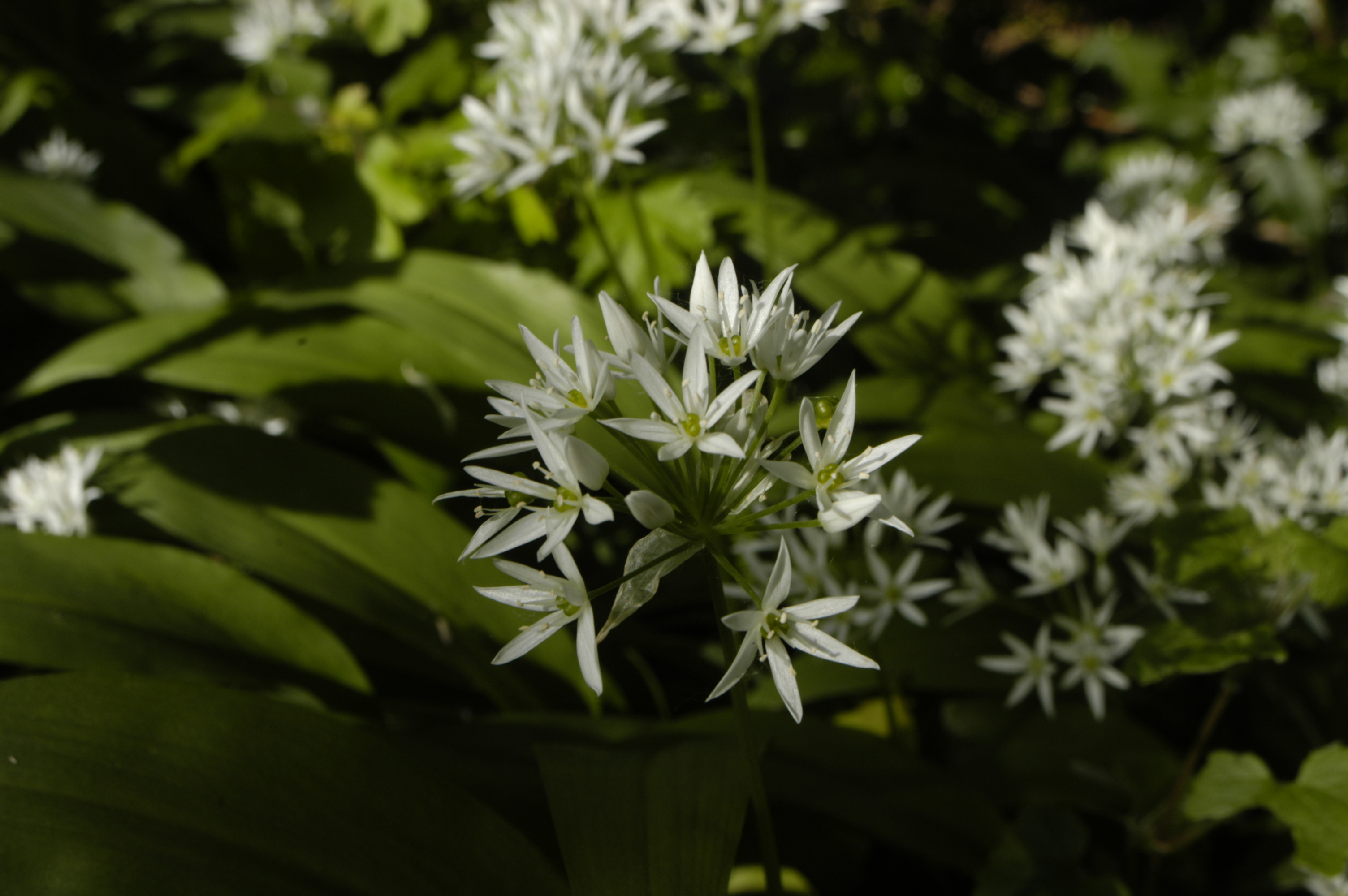
Wild garlic in Hampshire, UK

Allium ursinum, known as wild garlic, ramsons, cowleekes, cows's leek, cowleek, buckrams, broad-leaved garlic, wood garlic, bear leek, Eurasian wild garlic, onion grass, or bear's garlic, is a bulbous perennial flowering plant in the amaryllis family, Amaryllidaceae. It is native to Eurasia, where it grows in moist woodland. It is a wild relative of onion and garlic, all belonging to the same genus, Allium. There are two recognized subspecies: A. ursinum subsp. ursinum and A. ursinum subsp. ucrainicum.

== Etymology ==
The Latin specific name ursinum translates to 'bear' and refers to the supposed fondness of the brown bear for the bulbs; folk tales describe the bears consuming them after awakening from hibernation. Another theory is that the "ursinum" may refer to Ursa Major, as A. ursinum was perhaps one of the most northerly distributed Allium species known to the ancient Greeks, though this hypothesis is disputed. Common names for the plant in many languages also make reference to bears.

Cows love to eat them, hence the modern vernacular name of cows' leek. In Devon, dairy farmers have occasionally had the milk of their herds rejected because of the garlic flavour imparted to it by the cows having grazed upon the plant.

Ramsons is from the Old English word hramsa, meaning "garlic". There is evidence it has been used in British cuisine since the Celtic Britons over 1,500 years ago.

Early healers among the Celts, Gaels, and Teutonic tribes and ancient Romans were familiar with the wild herb and called it herba salutaris, meaning 'healing herb'.

== Description ==
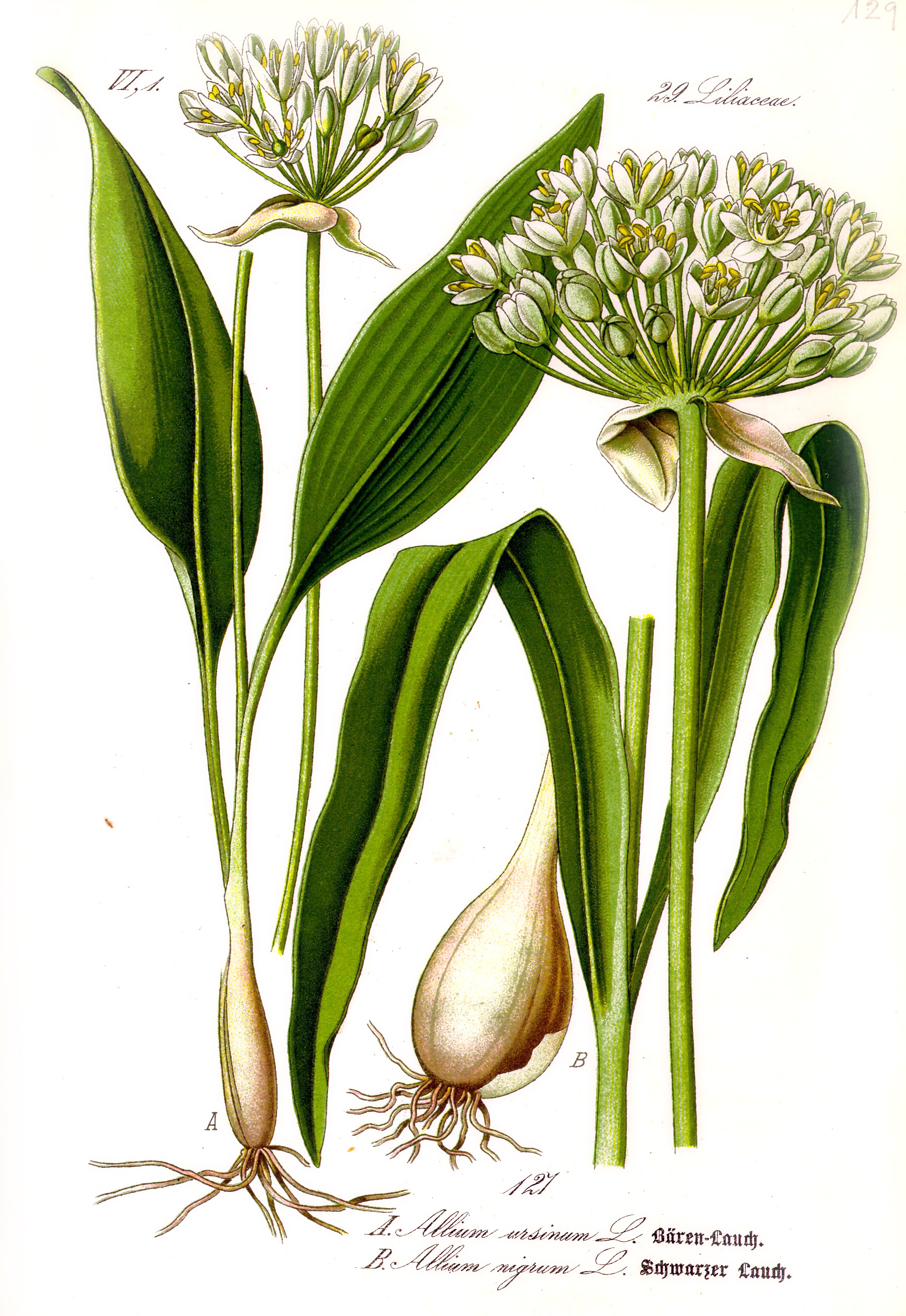
1885 illustration from Otto Wilhelm Thomé

Allium ursinum is a bulbous, perennial herbaceous monocot, that reproduces primarily by seed. The narrow bulbs are formed from a single leaf base and produce bright green entire, elliptical leaves up to 25 cm (10 in) long by 7 cm (3 in) wide with a petiole up to 20 cm (8 in) long. The inflorescence is an umbel of six to 20 white flowers, lacking the bulbils produced by some other Allium species such as Allium vineale (crow garlic) and Allium oleraceum (field garlic). The flowers are star-like with six white tepals, about 16–20 mm (5/8–13/16 in) in diameter, with stamens shorter than the perianth.

It flowers in the British Isles from April to June, starting before deciduous trees leaf in the spring. The flower stem is triangular in cross-section and the leaves are broadly lanceolate, similar to those of the toxic lily of the valley (Convallaria majalis).

=== Similarity to poisonous plants ===
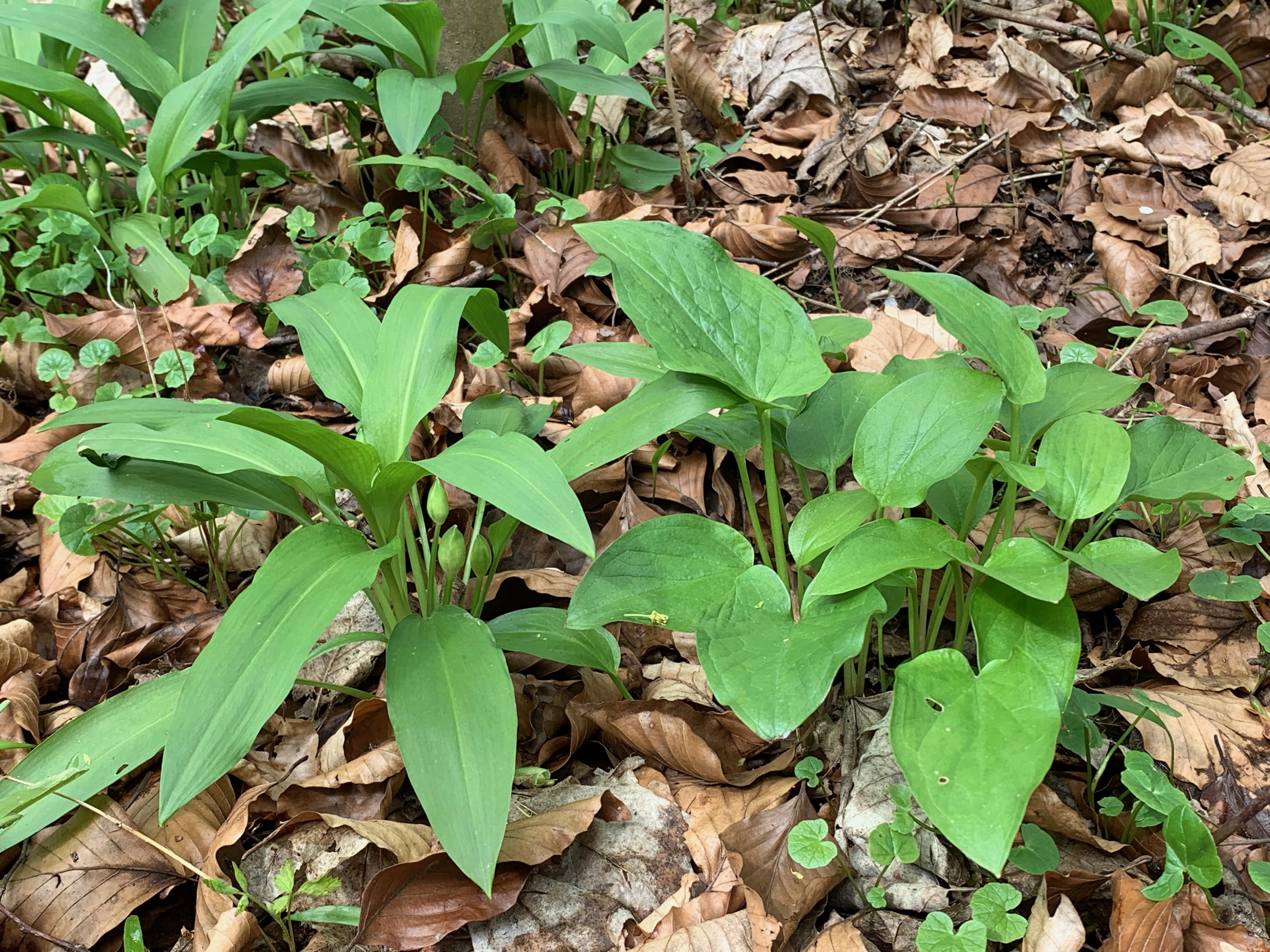
Allium ursinum (left) and Arum maculatum (right) growing side by side in a woodland

Plants that may be mistaken for A. ursinum include lily of the valley, Colchicum autumnale, Arum maculatum, and Veratrum viride or Veratrum album, all of which are poisonous. In Europe, where ramsons are popularly harvested from the wild, people are regularly poisoned after mistakenly picking lily of the valley or Colchicum autumnale.

Grinding the leaves between the fingers and checking for a garlic-like smell can be helpful, but if the smell remains on the hands, one can mistake a subsequent poisonous plant for a safe one. When the leaves of A. ursinum and Arum maculatum first sprout, they look similar, but unfolded Arum maculatum leaves have irregular edges and many deep veins, while the leaves of ramsons are convex with a single main vein. The leaves of lily of the valley are in pairs, dull green, and come from a single reddish-purple stem, while the leaves of A. ursinum each have their own stem, are shiny when new, and are bright green.

== Distribution and habitat ==
It is native to Europe and Asia, where it grows in moist woodland. It can be found in temperate Europe from Ireland east to the Caucasus. It is common in much of the lowlands of the British Isles with the exception of the far north of Scotland, Orkney and Shetland. The ursinum subspecies is found in western and central Europe, while the ucrainicum subspecies is found in the east and southeast.

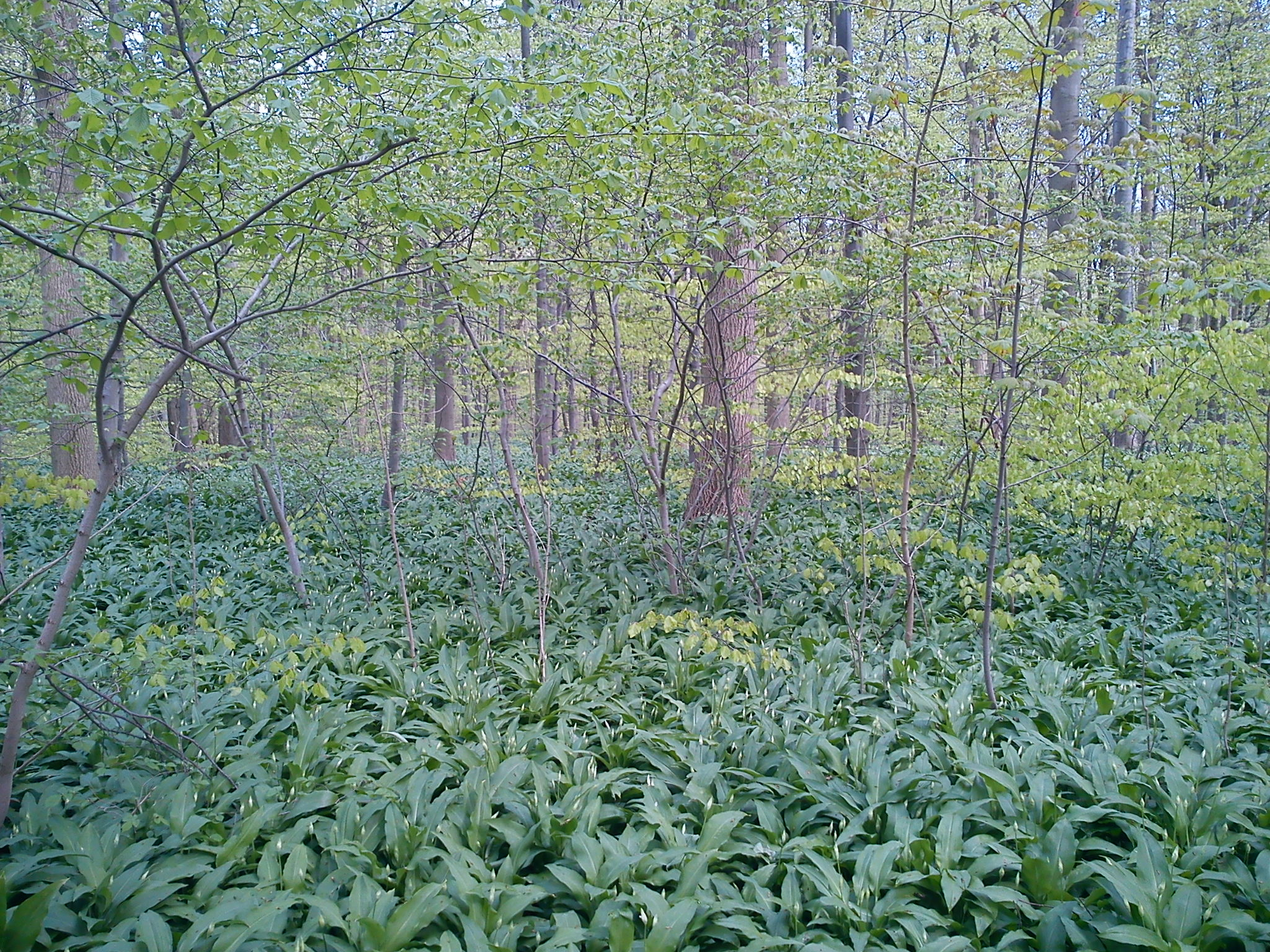
A. ursinum covers the forest floor in early May (Riis Skov, Denmark)

It grows in deciduous woodlands with moist soils, preferring slightly acidic conditions. In the British Isles, colonies are frequently associated with bluebells (Hyacinthoides non-scripta), especially in ancient woodland. It is considered to be an ancient woodland indicator species.

== Ecology ==
As its name suggests, A. ursinum is an important food for brown bears. The plant is also a favourite of wild boar.

A. ursinum is the primary larval host plant for a specialised hoverfly, Portevinia maculata (ramsons hoverfly).

The flowers are pollinated by bees.

== Uses ==
All parts of A. ursinum are edible. The leaves can be used as a salad or boiled as a vegetable. A variety of Cornish Yarg cheese has a rind coated in wild garlic leaves.

In the Swiss Neolithic settlement of Thayngen-Weier (Cortaillod culture), a high concentration of pollen from A. ursinum was found in the settlement layer, interpreted by some as evidence for use of the plant as fodder.

== Gallery ==
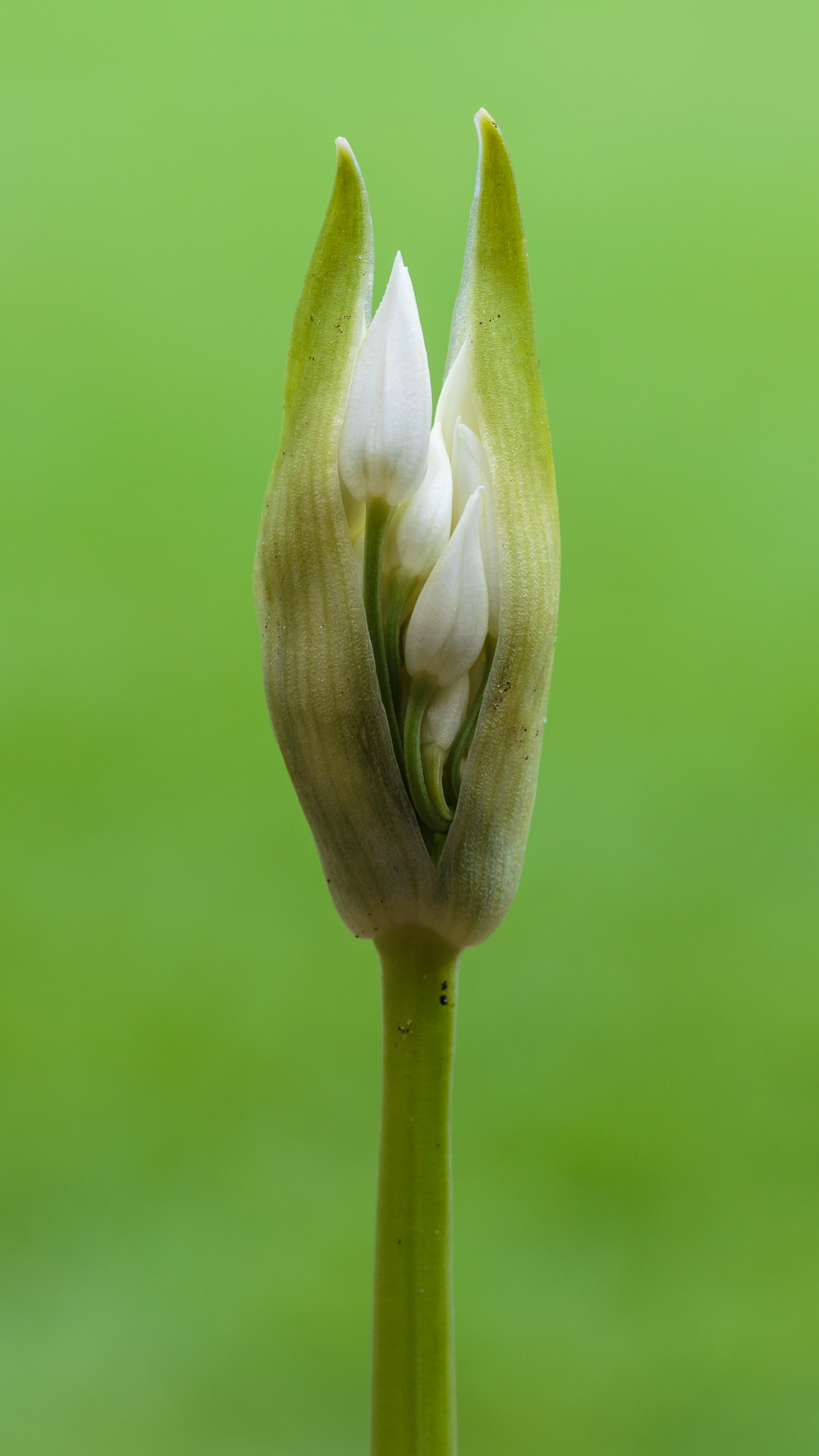
Flower bud

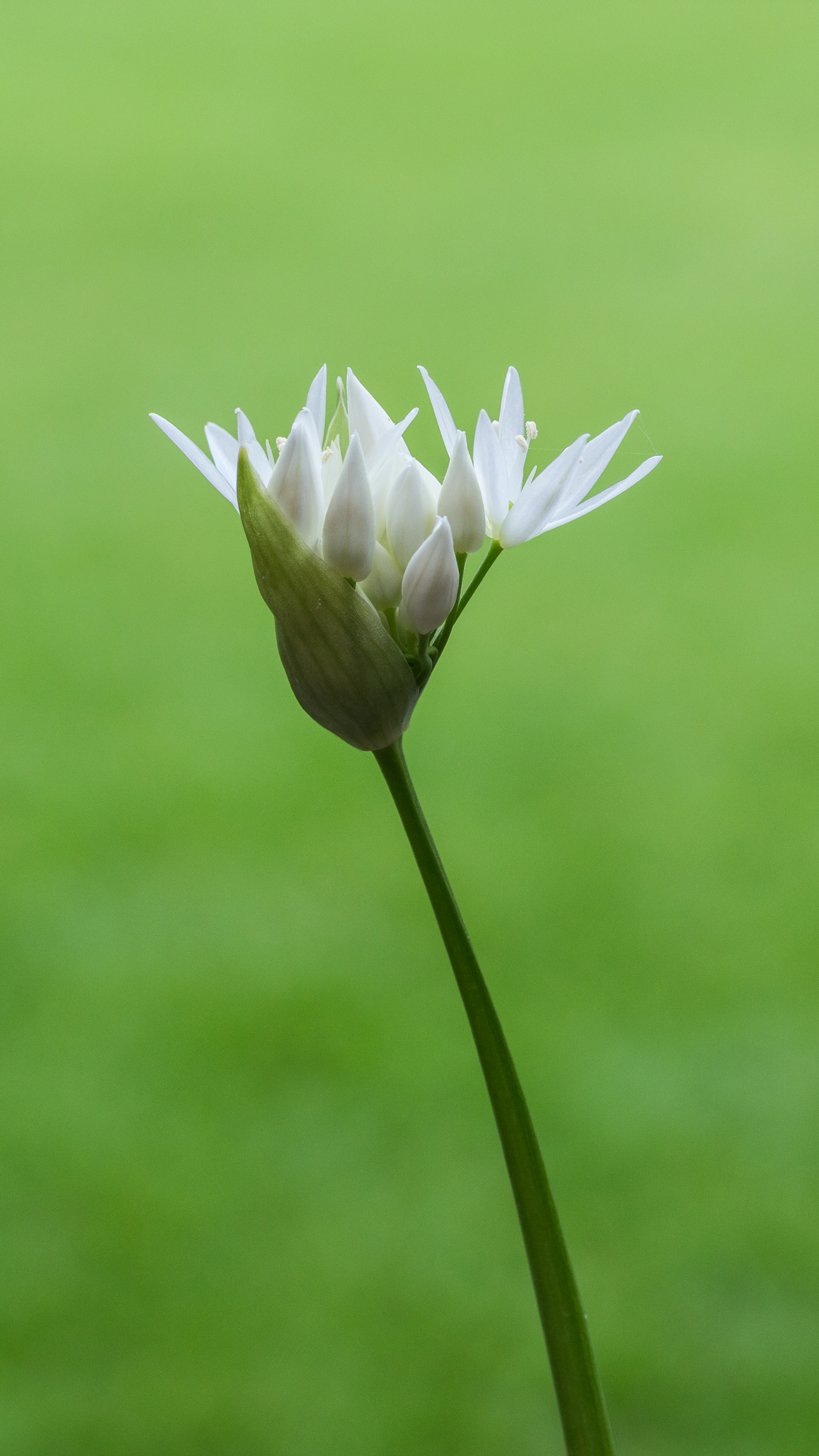
Young flowers

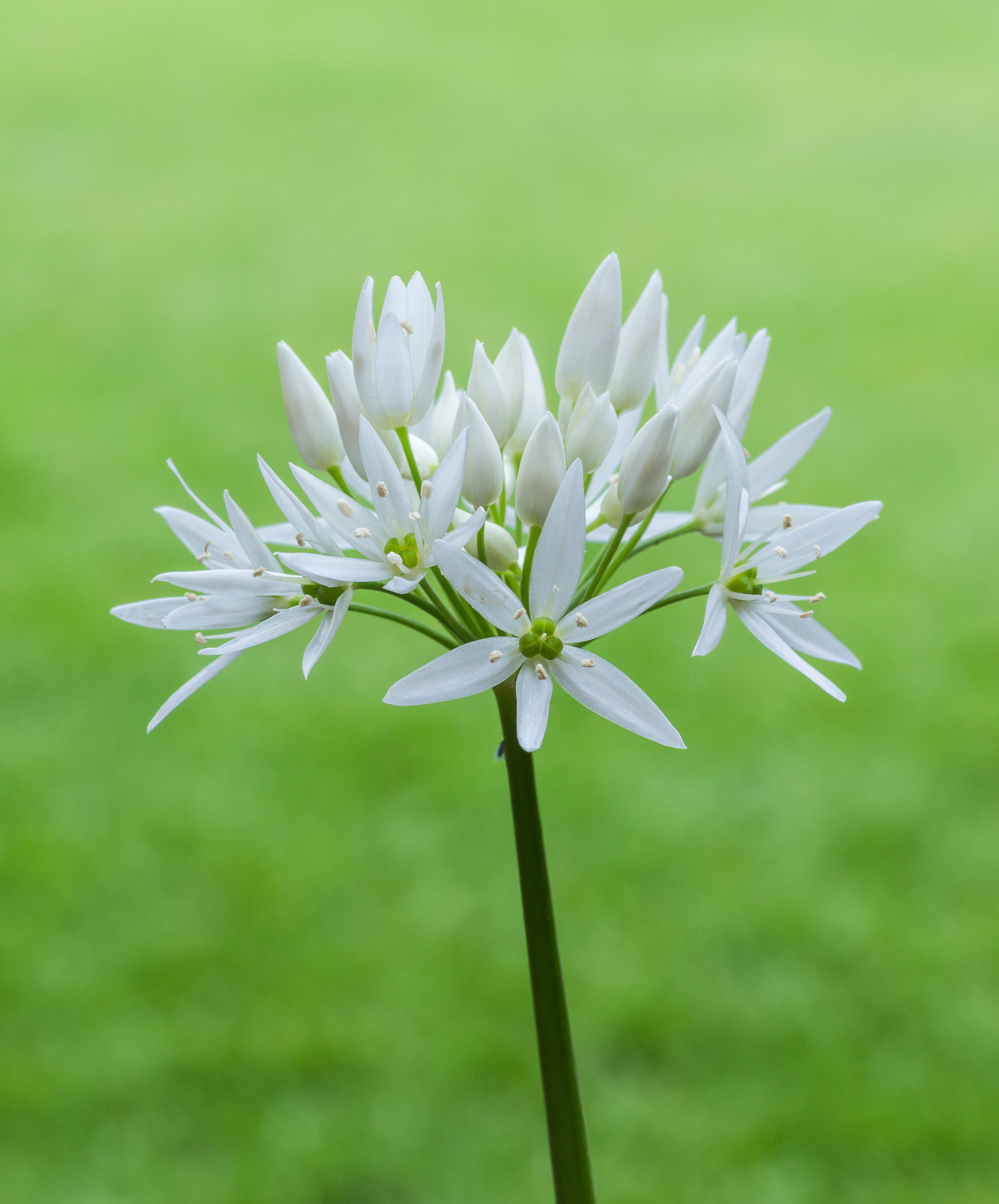

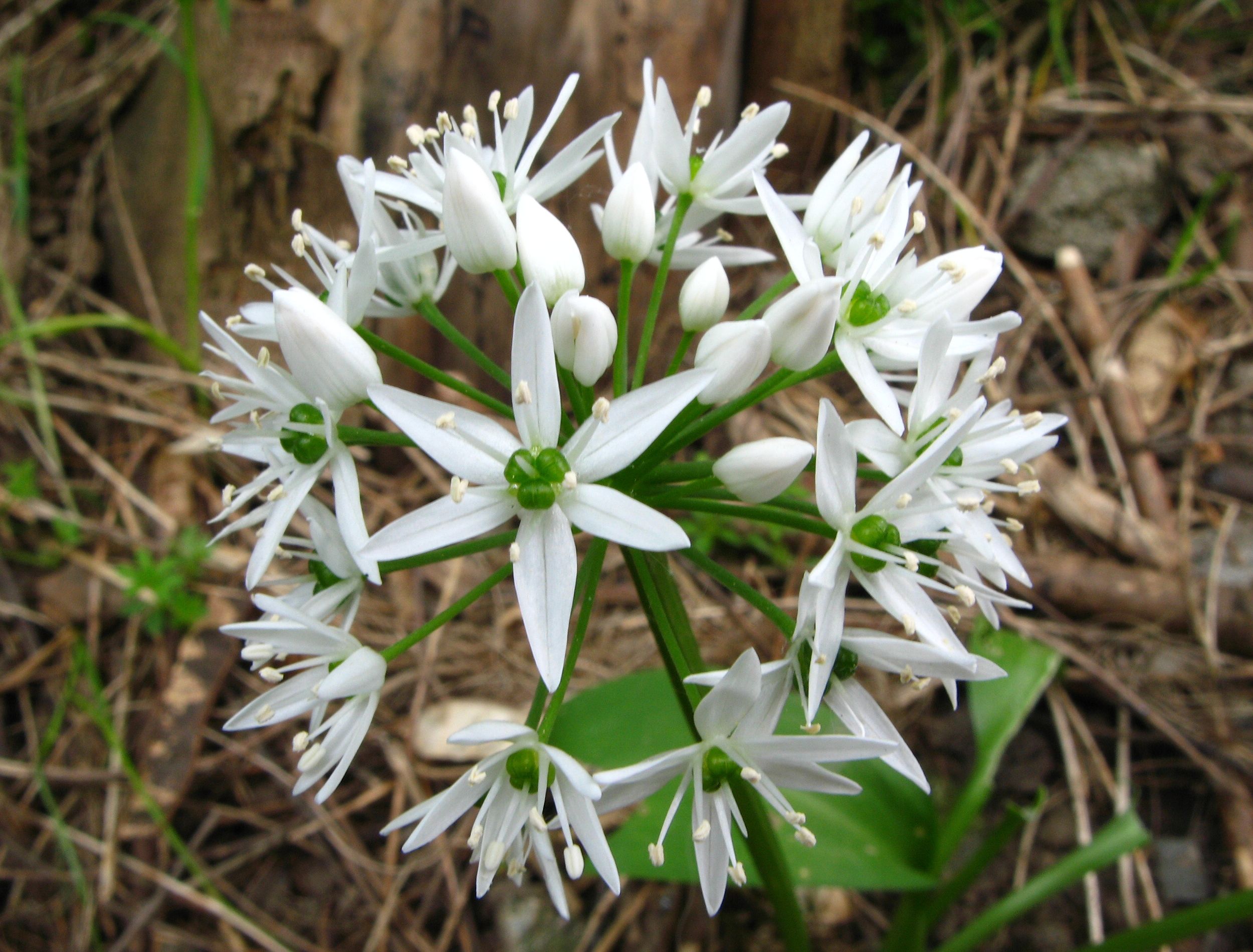

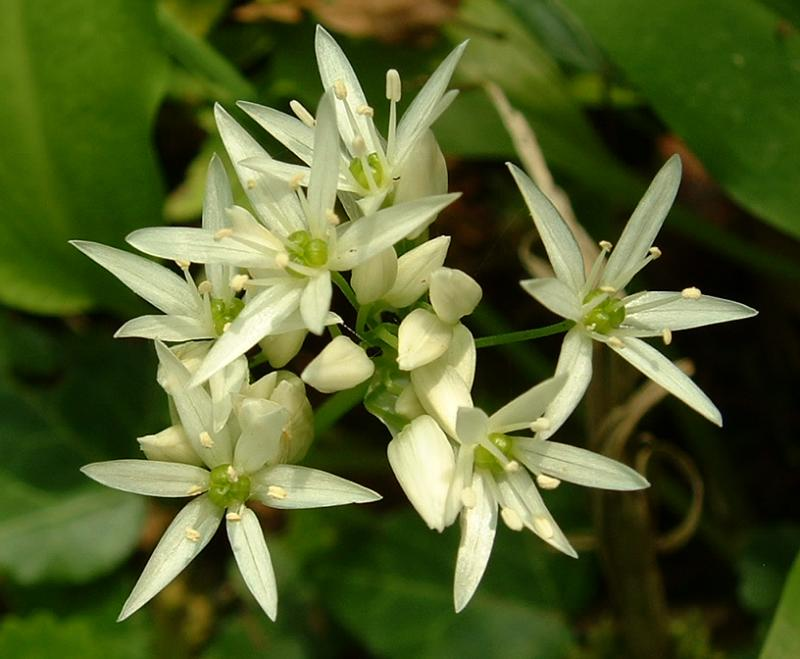

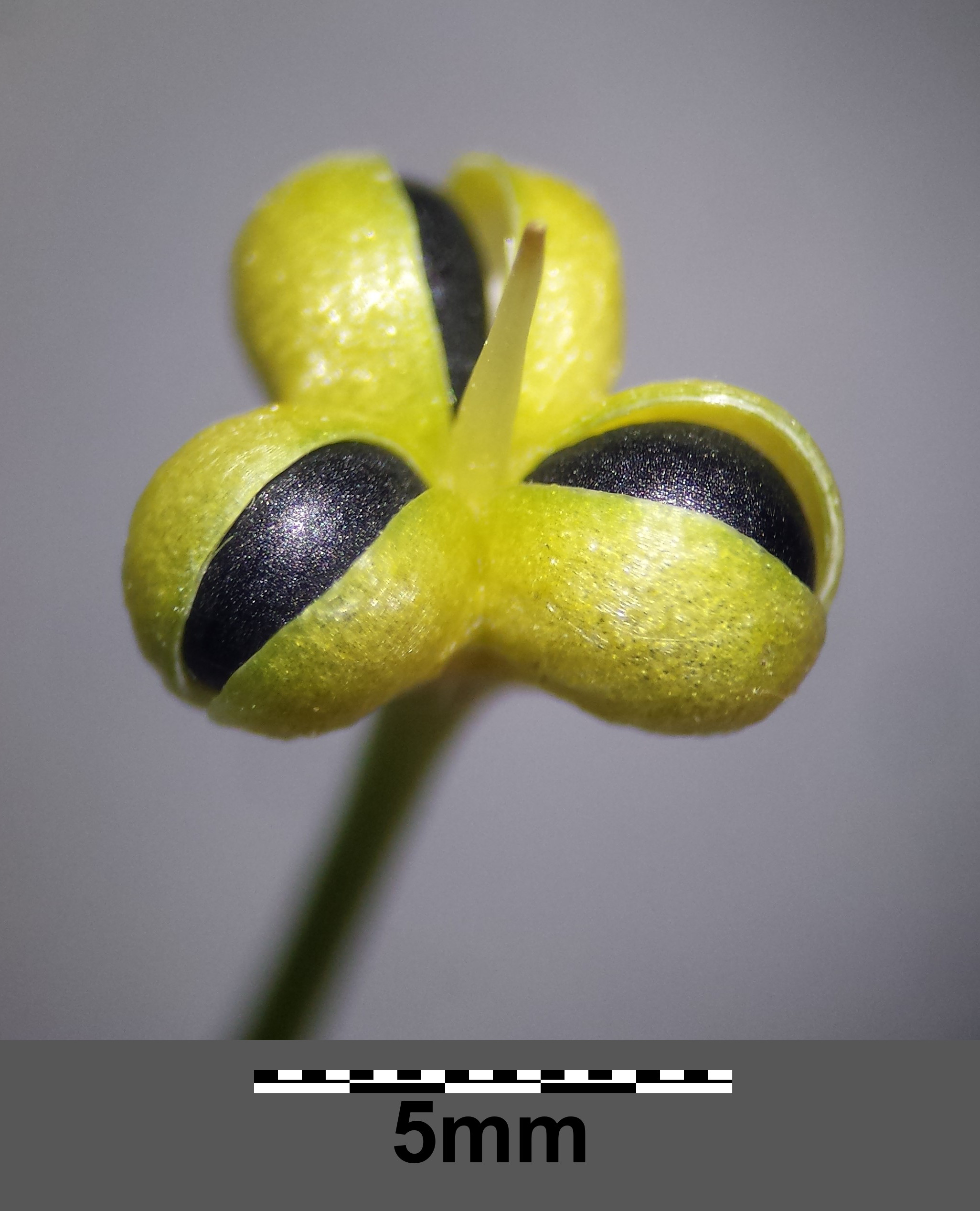
Fruit with seeds

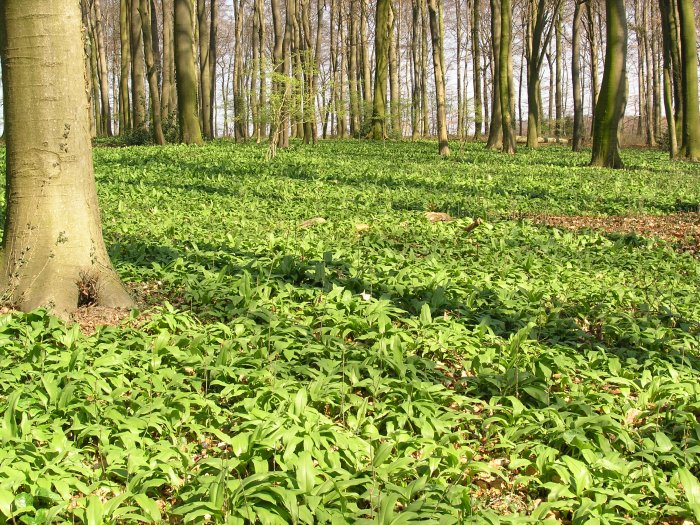
Ramsons in a forest

== See also ==
- Allioideae
- Allium tricoccum – North American wild leek (or "ramps", a cognate of "ramsons")
- Allium ampeloprasum – Eurasian broadleaf wild leek
- Allium ochotense
- Allium victorialis
- List of Allium species
