= Salmo ezenami =

Conservation status
- Critically Endangered (IUCN 3.1)

Scientific classification
- Kingdom: Animalia
- Phylum: Chordata
- Class: Actinopterygii
- Order: Salmoniformes
- Family: Salmonidae
- Genus: Salmo
- Species: S. ezenami

Binomial name
- Salmo ezenami L. S. Berg, 1948

Species of fish

Salmo ezenami, known as the Kezenoi-Am trout, is a critically endangered freshwater salmonid fish, endemic to Lake Kezenoi-Am (Lake Eizenam) in Northern Caucasus.

The only natural habitat where this species occurs is in Lake Kezenoi-Am in Chechnya at the border of Dagestan. This lake is a cold alpine lake, with an area of 2.4 km^{2} (0.93 sq mi), a maximum depth of 74 m (243 ft), and at an altitude of 1,870 m (6,140 ft) above sea level. In addition, the species has been introduced to another lake in Dagestan, Lake Mochokh, probably successfully.

Salmo ezenami used to be the only fish species in Lake Kezenoi-Am. However, two other species, the European chub and Caspian gudgeon have been introduced, and present a threat by eating the fry of Salmo.

Salmo ezenami spawns in the lake, close to underwater springs. Adult fish also probably migrate to tributaries. There are separate small-sized and large-sized adult forms with size ranges of 160–260 mm (6.3–10.2 in) and 380–1,130 mm (15–44 in) respectively. Young prey on gammarids and chironomids; adults also eat molluscs and fishes, after the introduction of nonnative species.
