= Shatoi Reserve =

Natural reserve in Chechnya, Russia

Shatoi Reserve is the largest reserve in Chechnya. It covers more than 20,000 hectares (49,000 acres) of forest land and adjoins the Vedeno Reserve. The reserve lies between the Chanti-Argun and Sharo-Argun Rivers. The dominant vegetation consists of valuable trees, and berry bushes, nut trees, herbal plants (medicinal and melliferous) and also mushrooms.
