= Vedeno Reserve =

Natural reserve in Chechnya, Russia

Vedeno Reserve is a reserve in Chechnya. It adjoins the Shatoi Reserve.
