= Ainu cuisine =

Culinary traditions of Ainu people

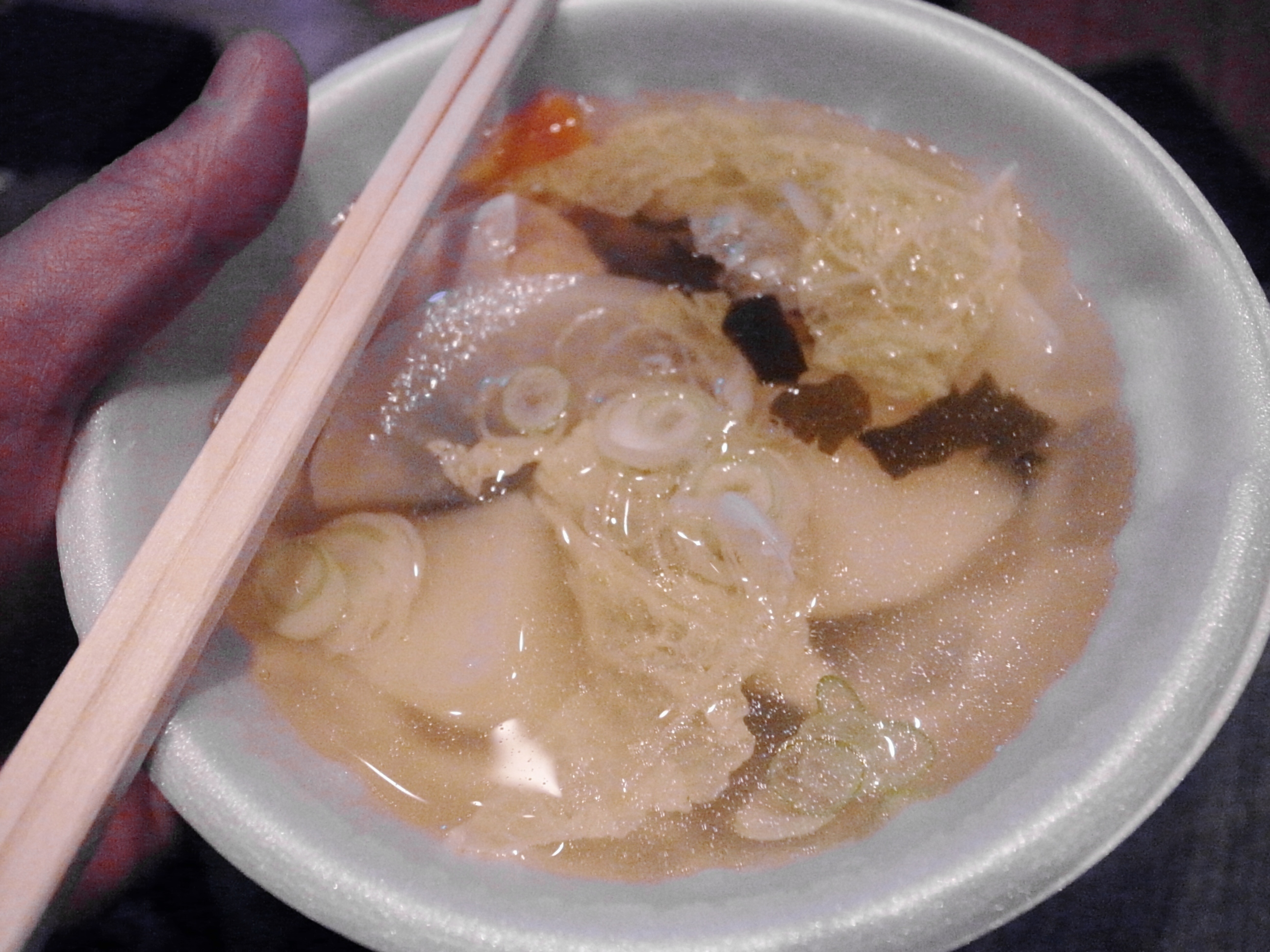
Ohaw, traditional Ainu soup

Ainu cuisine is the cuisine of the ethnic Ainu in Japan and Russia. The cuisine differs markedly from that of the majority Yamato people of Japan. Raw meat like sashimi, for example, is rarely served in Ainu cuisine, which instead uses methods such as boiling, roasting and curing to prepare meat. Also unlike Japanese cuisine, traditional Ainu cuisine did not use miso, soy sauce, or sugar, though these seasonings make an appearance in modern Ainu cuisine. The island of Hokkaidō in northern Japan is where most Ainu live today; however, they once inhabited most of the Kuril Islands, the southern half of Sakhalin island, and parts of northern Honshū Island.

There are very few Ainu restaurants in the world, though some do exist. Examples of Ainu restaurants include Haru Koro (Harukor) in Shinjuku, Tokyo, Ashiri Kotan Nakanoshima in Sapporo, and Poron'no and Marukibune in Akan, Hokkaidō.

== Overview ==
Traditional Ainu cuisine used meats obtained through fishing and hunting such as salmon and deer, wild plants gathered in the mountains such as Cardiocrinum cordatum bulbs (turep) and acorns, as well as various grains and potatoes obtained through farming. Another feature is its liberal use of oils as flavoring. Due to the Ainu's reliance on local game and fauna, not all areas used all the same ingredients, instead utilizing what was most available.

In addition to salt, the fats (sum) from cod, sardines, herring, shark, seal, whale (humpesum), sika deer (yuksum), and bear (pasum) are used to flavor dishes. Miso and soy sauce have also been used in modern times. Soup stocks may be made using kelp (kombu), animal bone, and dried fish. Seasoning and spices include pukusa (Allium ochotense), berries from the Amur corktree (Phellodendron amurense), and wavy bittercress (Cardamine flexuosa).

== Ingredients ==
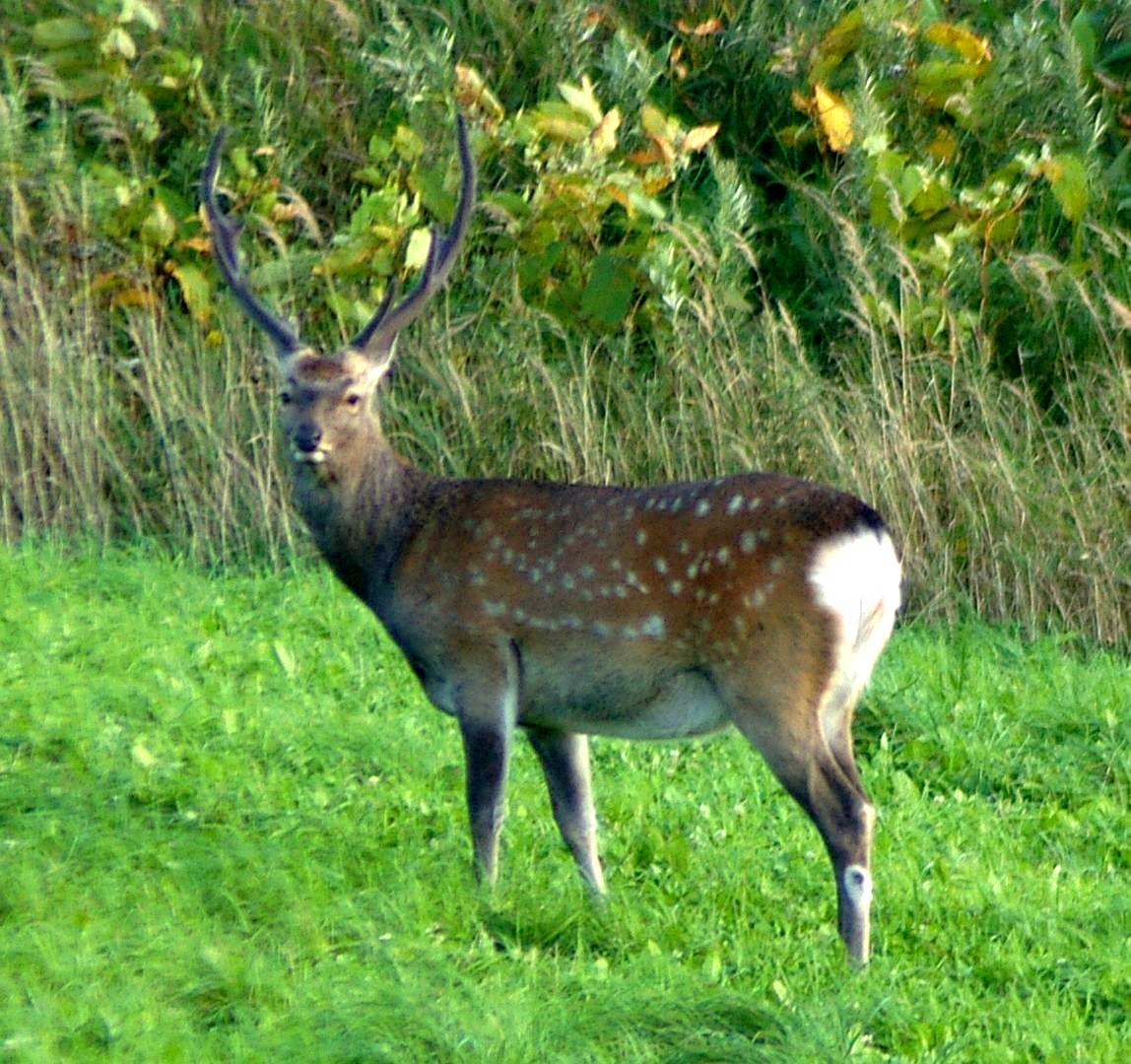
Yuk, sika deer.

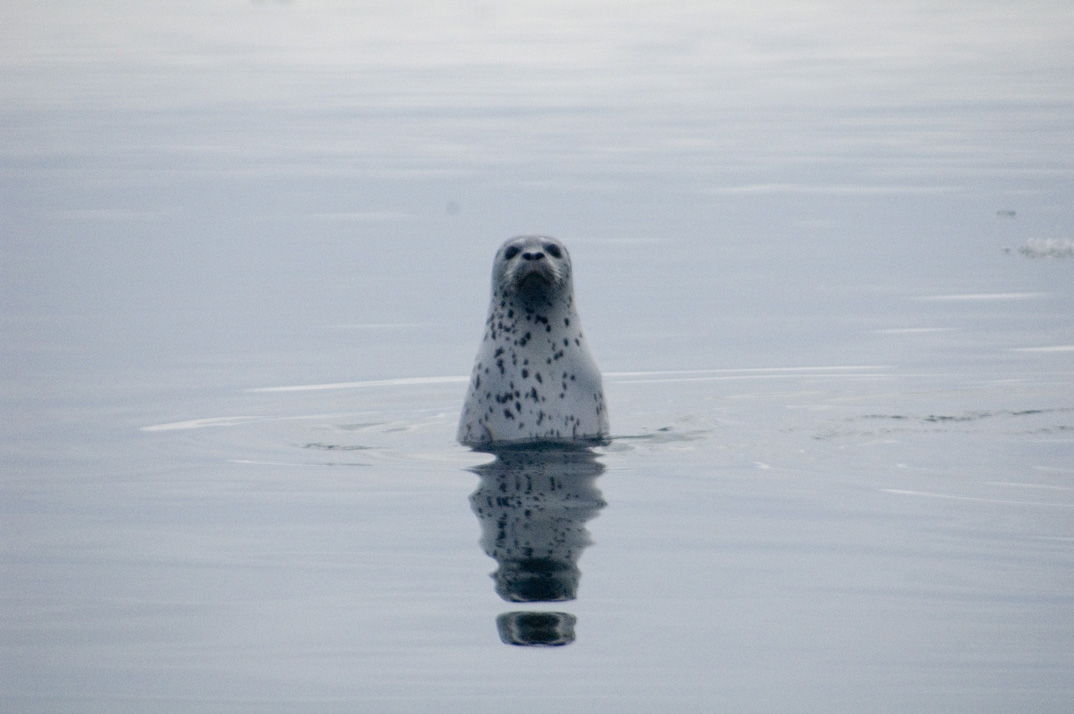
Tukar, seal. The Ainu of Sakhalin had various uses for its fat.

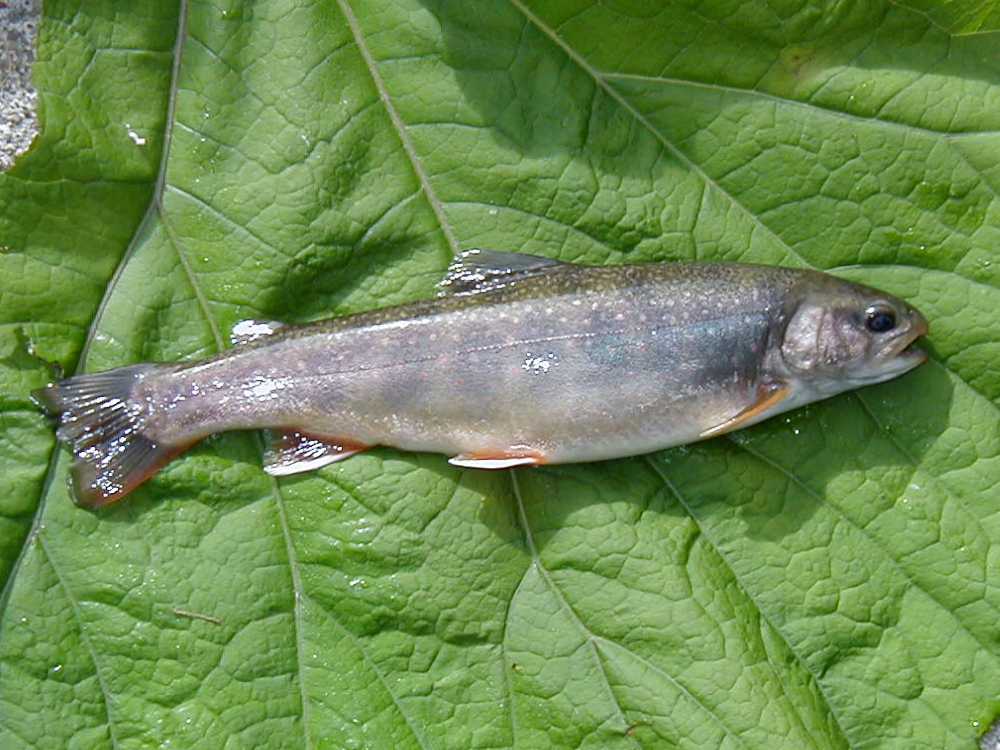
Ciporkeso, Japanese char. Native to Hokkaidō, and a member of the Dolly Varden trout species.

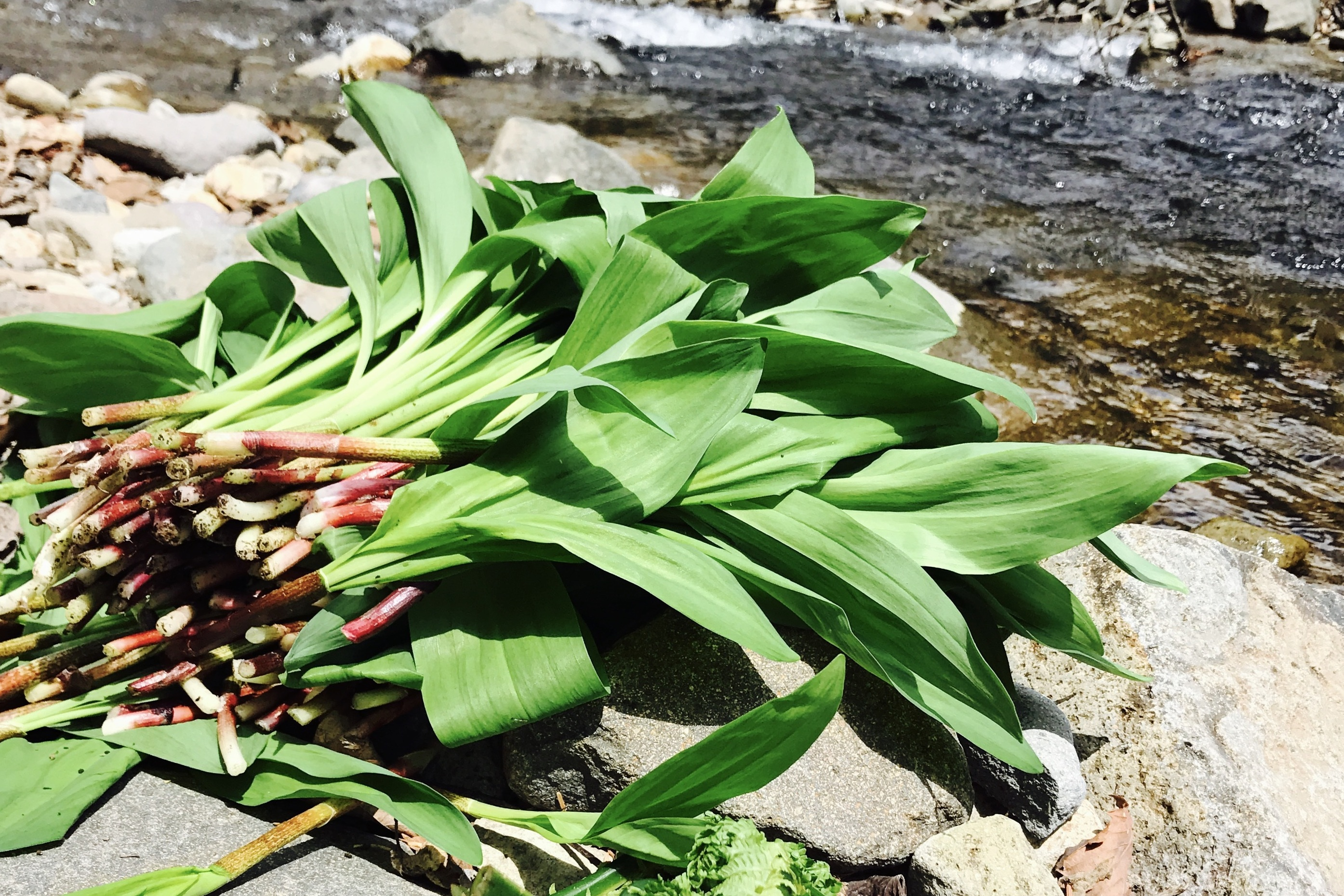
Traditionally, women usually gathered wild plants such as pukusa.

=== Game ===
The most predominate game animal was the sika deer. Deer were hunted using poisoned arrows as well as by herding them off cliffs and gathering them from where they fell. In the past, deer were so common and easily hunted in Hokkaidō that it was said one could “put the pot on the fire, then go hunting”.

- Brown bear (kimun kamuy)
- Chipmunk (ruop)
- Eurasian jay (parkew)
- Eurasian tree sparrow (amameciri)
- Ezo red fox (cironnup)
- Hazel Grouse (humiruy)
- Japanese marten (hoinu)
- Mallard (kopeca)
- Oriental turtle dove (kusuyep)
- Rabbit (isopo kamuy)
- Raccoon dog (moyuk)
- Sika deer (yuk)

=== Fish and sea creatures ===
The Ainu fished at sea in dugout canoes using harpoons to hunt a variety of large marine animals and used nets and fishing rods to bring in smaller creatures. Beached whales were particularly prized, as generally it was impossible to bring a whale in using canoes and harpoons. However, there were some instances of whaling in Funka Bay using harpoons coated with wolfsbane poison, aided by the gentle tides. The Ainu also used a number of tools including fishing rods, nets, traps (uray), and fishing baskets (raomap) to catch freshwater fish.

- Bathyraja lindbergi (uttap)
- Capelin (susam)
- Cod (erekus)
- Crucian carp (rampara)
- Dolphin (tannup)
- Flounder (samampe)
- Fur seal (unew)
- Japanese dace (supun)
- Japanese fluvial sculpin (cimikani)
- Japanese huchen (ciray)
- Japanese smelt (tokikar)
- Masu salmon (icankot)
- Ocean sunfish (kinapo)
- Pacific herring (heroki)
- Pond loach (cicira)
- Salmon (kamuycep)
- Saffron cod (komay)
- Sardine (iwashi)
- Sea lion (etaspe)
- Seal (tukar)
- Shark (same)
- Sturgeon (yupe)
- Swordfish (sirkap)
- Trout (icaniw)
- Whitespotted char (tuksis)

=== Gathered plants ===
While men were responsible for hunting and fishing, women were responsible for gathering edible plants, beginning in early spring. Tools used during gathering trips into the mountains included the saranip (a bag woven from the fibers of the Japanese lime tree), the menoko makiri (a small women's knife), itani (a type of digging stick), and the shitap (a small pick made from deer horn). One of the most important mountain plants gathered in spring was the Siberian onion (pukusa), which is very similar to wild leeks found in Canada and the United States in taste, texture, and appearance. Large quantities of Cardiocrinum cordatum bulbs (turep) were gathered in summer as they were important as a preserved food.

Spring

- Anemone flaccida (ohaw kina or pukusakina)
- Angelica (cihue)
- Butterbur (makayo)
- Bracken (warumbi)
- Cow parsnip (pittok)
- Hog peanut (eha)
- Japanese butterbur (korkoni)
- Japanese mugwort (noya)
- Japanese spikenard (cimakina)
- Lance asiabell roots (topmuk)
- Long-stamen chive bulbs (mempiro)
- Maianthemum japonicum (pepero)
- Marsh-marigold roots (pui)
- Ostrich fern (sorma)
- Siberian onion (pukusa)
- Symplocarpus renifolius (sikerpe kina)
- Thistle (ancami)

Summer

- Cardiocrinum cordatum bulbs (turep)

Fall

- Amur cork tree berries (sikerpe)
- Crimson glory vine fruit (hat)
- Hardy kiwi fruit (kutci)
- Hen-of-the-woods mushroom (yuk karus)
- Japanese chestnuts (yam)
- Japanese emperor oak acorns (nisew)
- Japanese rose fruit (maw)
- Mushroom (karus)
- Oak acorns (pero)
- Walnuts (neshiko)
- Water caltrop fruit (pekampe)

=== Crops ===
Farming was already taking place in Hokkaidō during the Jōmon period, prior to the Satsumon period in which the Ainu culture first emerged. However, agriculture began to decline in the 12th century up until the Ainu period. This is thought to be caused by the increase in demand for dried fish and furs for trade with Honshū, leading to increased importance in hunting and fishing, rather than colder weather. Cultivated crops changed over the years as new crops were introduced, such as potatoes, kabocha, and beans.

- Bean varieties (mame)
- Buckwheat (soba)
- Foxtail millet (munchiro)
- Japanese millet (piyap)
- Potato (imo)
- Proso millet (menkul)
- Pumpkin (kabocha)
- Turnip (atane)

== Primary dishes ==
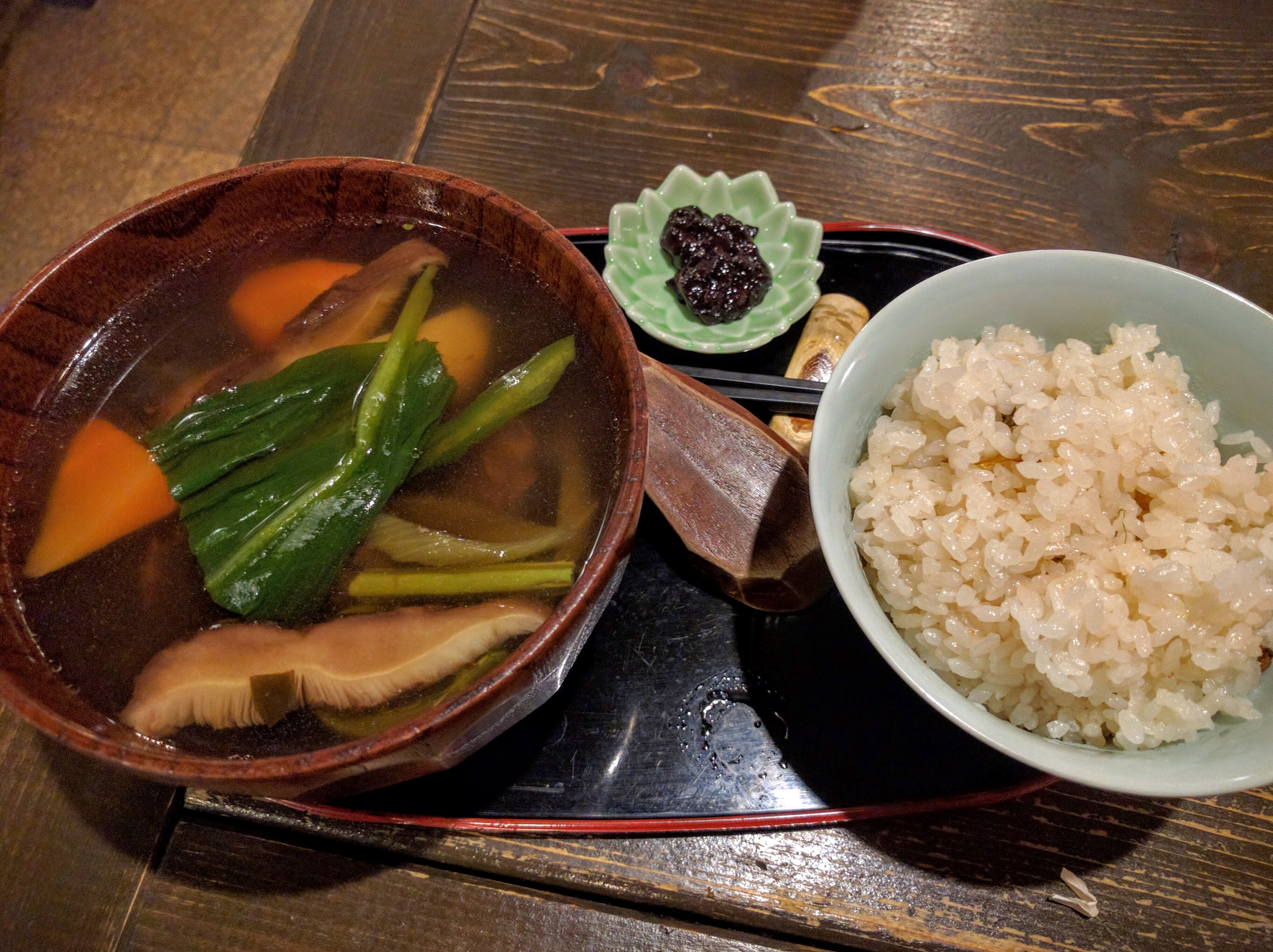
An Ainu-style meal with venison and mountain vegetable soup (yuk ohaw), fermented salmon liver (mefun) and rice mixed with grains.

=== Citatap ===
Citatap translated from Ainu means “that which has been pounded”. As the name suggests, citatap is meat or fish that has been pounded in a way similar to the Japanese method tataki.

Making citatap

1. Salmon head, milt, and remains from filleting are placed on a cutting board-like round piece of wood sliced from a tree trunk (itatani). The meat is chopped and beaten with a sharp heavy object, such as a hatchet.
2. The resulting paste is flavored with minced spring onion, pukusa, or long-stamen chive.
3. Finally, the citatap is seasoned with dried kelp and salt.

Other than salmon, a variety of meats and fish are used to add flavor to citatap such as Japanese dace, bathyraja lindbergi, masu salmon, Japanese fluvial sculpin, deer, bear, tanuki, rabbit, and chipmunk. Citatap was well suited to the meat of older animals, as it made the tough meat easier to eat. Citatap was primarily made in the winter, when food spoiled more slowly, and was eaten over a number of days. If the citatap was not particularly fresh, it was formed into balls and added to soup.

=== Ohaw ===
Ohaw is soup made from boiling fish or meats with various vegetables. It may have the consistency of soup, or be more like a Japanese nabemono (hot pot) that contains a high ratio of ingredients to broth. As a hunter-gatherer society, the Ainu did not have a staple food as such, but ohaw was a central dish in their food culture. It is thought to be the roots of Hokkaidō regional dishes such as Ishikari nabe and sanpei soup. There are no specific requirements of ingredients to use for ohaw, but was generally made as described below.

1. A stock is created by heating animal bone or small dried fish in water.
2. Roughly chopped meat or fish is added to the stock and cooked. Dried meat and fish require longer cooking times. The scum that results from cooking the meats is not removed, as it was thought to have medicinal properties.
3. Root vegetables or those which required longer cooking times are added, followed by high fiber mountain vegetables, and finally leafy vegetables. The soup is allowed to cook further until all ingredients are soft.
4. The soup is flavored with animal or fish fats, a small amount of salt, and topped with ground dried kelp or dried pukusa.

Different varieties of ohaw are named by their main ingredient such as cep ohaw (fish soup), kamuy ohaw (bear soup), kam ohaw (meat soup), and kina ohaw (vegetable soup). Anemone flaccida was particularly suited for use in soups and was therefore called ohaw kina, which literally translates as “soup grass”.

=== Rataskep ===
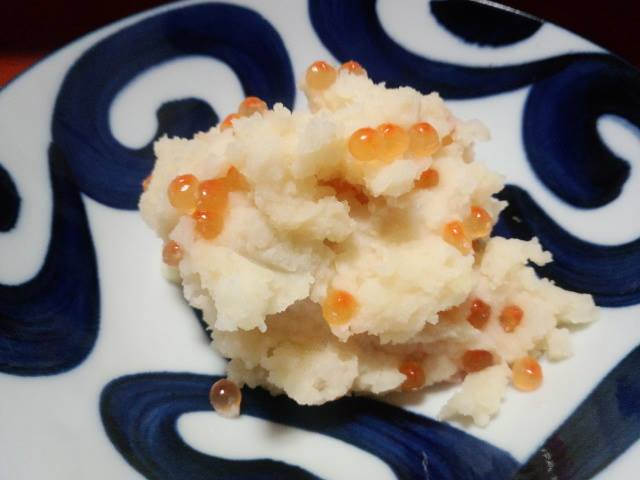
Cipor rataskep “potato and salmon roe”

Translated literally, rataskep means “mixed food”. Wild vegetables and beans are stewed until soft and the liquid has evaporated, at which point the mixture is mashed and seasoned with bear or fish oils and a small amount of salt. Rataskep was made as an everyday food, as well as for offerings at ceremonies, as it was considered a sacred food. There are unlimited varieties using different ingredients, below are a few examples.

Sikerpe kina rataskep

Dried symplocarpus renifolius (sikerpe kina) is rehydrated in hot water, then boiled over low heat for hours until the water evaporates. It is cut into easy-to-eat pieces and seasoned with animal fat and salt.

Pukusa rataskep

Beans are boiled until soft, at which point Siberian onion (pukusa) stalks are added and cooked further, then seasoned with animal fat and salt.

Cihue rataskep

Made from angelica (cihue) gathered in early summer. Beans are boiled until soft, then angelica is added and further boiled. Finally, it is seasoned with animal and fish fats.

Kabocha rataskep

Beans are boiled until soft. Dried strips of pumpkin (kabocha) are rehydrated in water then boiled along with the beans. Once the pumpkin begins to break apart, the rataskep is seasoned with fish fats and salt and topped with berries from the Amur corktree (sikerpe).

Cipor rataskep

Also called cipor imo. Potatoes (imo) are boiled with skin on. Salmon roe (cipor) is placed in a separate pot and cooked over low heat until it starts to break down. The skin is removed from the cooked potatoes and they are sliced thickly before placing into the pot with the salmon roe. Salt is added and everything is mixed well.

Nisew rataskep

The hull is removed from acorns (nisew) which are then boiled and drained multiple times with the seed coat on to remove the bitter taste. They are then placed in water with beans and boiled together. The resulting broth is discarded. The water is replaced and the mixture is boiled further until soft, at which point corn flour is added. It is cooked to the desired consistency. Rice flour is added, the mixture is kneaded, and salt and animal fats are added for seasoning.

=== Sayo ===
A thin porridge made from boiling Japanese millet or rice. Generally, the grains are boiled alone, but occasionally gathered vegetables are added. Unlike other porridges in agricultural societies, sayo is not a staple food. Rather, Ainu would fill up on fatty soups and grilled meats then drink it like tea as a palate cleanser. For that reason, sayo was made in a small dedicated pot so as to avoid mixing oils in from other dishes. Care was also taken to avoid mixing flavors when serving by using a separate ladle specifically for serving sayo (sayo kasup), rather than the usual ladle for serving soup (kasup). As the porridge used very little grains to make, a month's supply for one person was approximately 1.8 liters. 108 liters would provide plenty for a family of five for a year.

The following are examples of sayo varieties.

Turep sayo

Sayo which contains on turep, the fermented remains from the process of making Cardiocrinum cordatum (turep) starch. The hard dried on turep is first ground with mortar and pestle, then rehydrated in water. The sediment is removed from the water then formed into dumplings approximately three centimeters in diameter, and cooked in the sayo. Sayo which contains the Cardiocrinum cordatum bulbs themselves is also called turep sayo.

Irup sayo

The starch from Cardiocrinum cordatum bulbs is made into dumplings (sito) and placed in the sayo.

Ento sayo

Sayo which contains Elsholtzia ciliata (ento), a mountain plant. This type of sayo was favored for its particular aroma.

Satsirari sayo

The lees (satsirari) left from the fermentation process of making rice wine (tonoto) is placed in sayo.

Kikinni sayo

Sayo which contains bark of the bird cherry tree (kikinni).

Cipor sayo

Salmon roe (cipor) is boiled along with the grain porridge. Raw salmon roe was only eaten in the fall as a delicacy. During other seasons, salted and dried roe (sat cipor) was used.

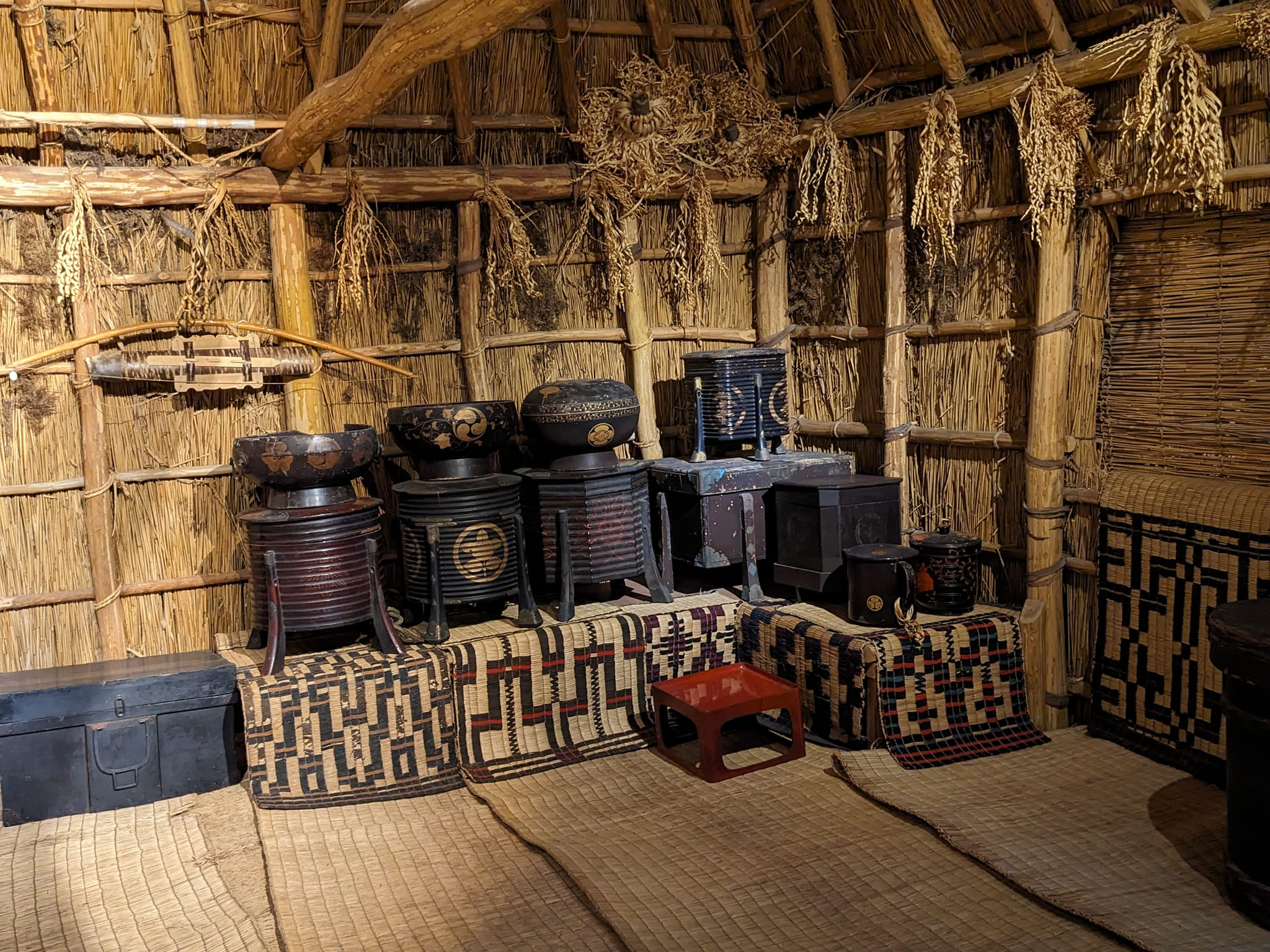
Lacquerware containers inside a traditional Ainu home (cise). These were used to present sito or tonoto (a type of alcohol) to the gods at festivals.

=== Sito ===
A type of dumplings. The name sito is derived from the Japanese shitogi which refers to dumplings or a paste made from grinding raw grains. Traditionally, sito were considered a luxury due to the time and effort necessary to produce the flour by grinding the grains with mortar and pestle. It was therefore not a usual everyday food, but one made as offerings for sacred days such as the Bear Festival (iomante) and Ancestors’ Festival (icarup).

Usual ingredients were proso millet (mankul), foxtail millet (munchiro), and rice (siamam), though sito made with proso millet were considered the correct form. Over the years, other ingredients were added such as pumpkin (kabocha), and potato (imo). Similar to the Japanese kusamochi, the Ainu also made sito which mixed in Japanese mugwort (noya). Their flavor was enjoyed as reminiscent of spring.

Making sito

1. Polished grains are left to soak overnight, then drained.
2. The grains are placed in a large mortar and multiple people sing while pounding the grain with large pestles (iutaupopo).
3. The resulting flour is kneaded with hot water and formed into round flat dumplings approximately 7 or 8 centimeters in diameter and 1 centimeter thick.
4. The dumplings are boiled in a large pot, taking care not to allow them to burn on the bottom of the pot.

Sito that were meant to be offerings were placed as is in ceremonial lacquerware boxes (sintoko), wooden bowls (patci), on small trays (otcike), or skewered with cornus controversa sticks and presented to the gods. When meant to be eaten by people, the sito were served with partially crushed salmon roe or a sauce made from mixing oils with dried and crushed kelp.

Sito has a long history. Dumplings made from foxtail millet have been found in archeological Satsumon remains discovered in Atsuma. Traditional Ainu cuisine did not use steamed rice to make dumplings, as the Japanese did with mochi. The Ainu first came in contact with Japanese style mochi after the Edo period when more ethnic Japanese moved to live in the same areas as the Ainu under the land contract system.

== Preserved foods ==
=== Dried meat and fish ===
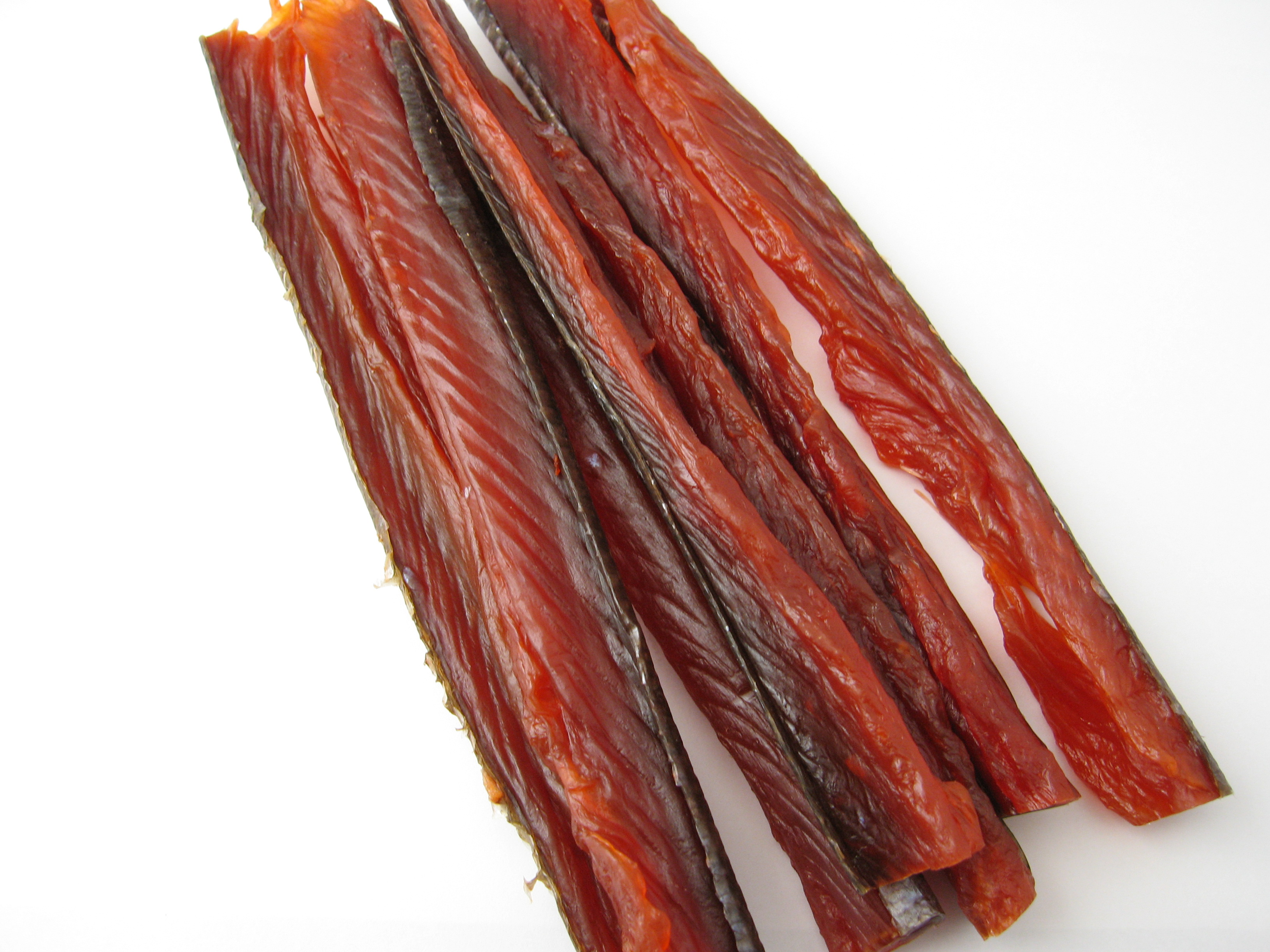
Saketoba, a famous local delicacy from Hokkaidō, said to have developed from Ainu preserved foods.

The Ainu word for dried meat is satkam while dried fish is called satcep, nikeruy, or atat.

Salmon was fished in quantities greater than what could be eaten immediately, especially in fall, and processed into preserved food so it could last up to six months. The first step in the process was to remove the head and internal organs of the fish, which was then dried on a rack outside before being taken inside and smoked in the hearth. Trout (icaniw) and Japanese char (tuksis) caught in summer were dried over a fire to prevent flies damaging the fish. These dried fish were eaten as is by pulling off the meat, or by rehydrating in water and eating as ingredients in soup or as a final cooked item itself. Salmon that was dried after the fish had laid eggs lost much of its flavor, so it was often stewed with added fish fats to improve the taste.

Milt (up) and salmon roe (cipor) obtained when slicing open the fish were also dried and preserved then later used in sayo or to make stock for ohaw.

While it was common to eat everything of a bear raw while it was still fresh, including its meat and its internal organs, the Ainu would also preserve some of the meat for consumption during the off season. Meat from deer (yuk) and brown bears (kimun kamuy) was cut into narrow strips and simmered in a large pot. Once the juices were removed, the meat was hung over the fire inside to dry and smoke. This satkam would be eaten as is, or boiled again to create a soup.

=== Cardiocrinum cordatum starch ===
The starch obtained from Cardiocrinum cordatum bulbs (turep) held a more important position in the Ainu diet than grains.

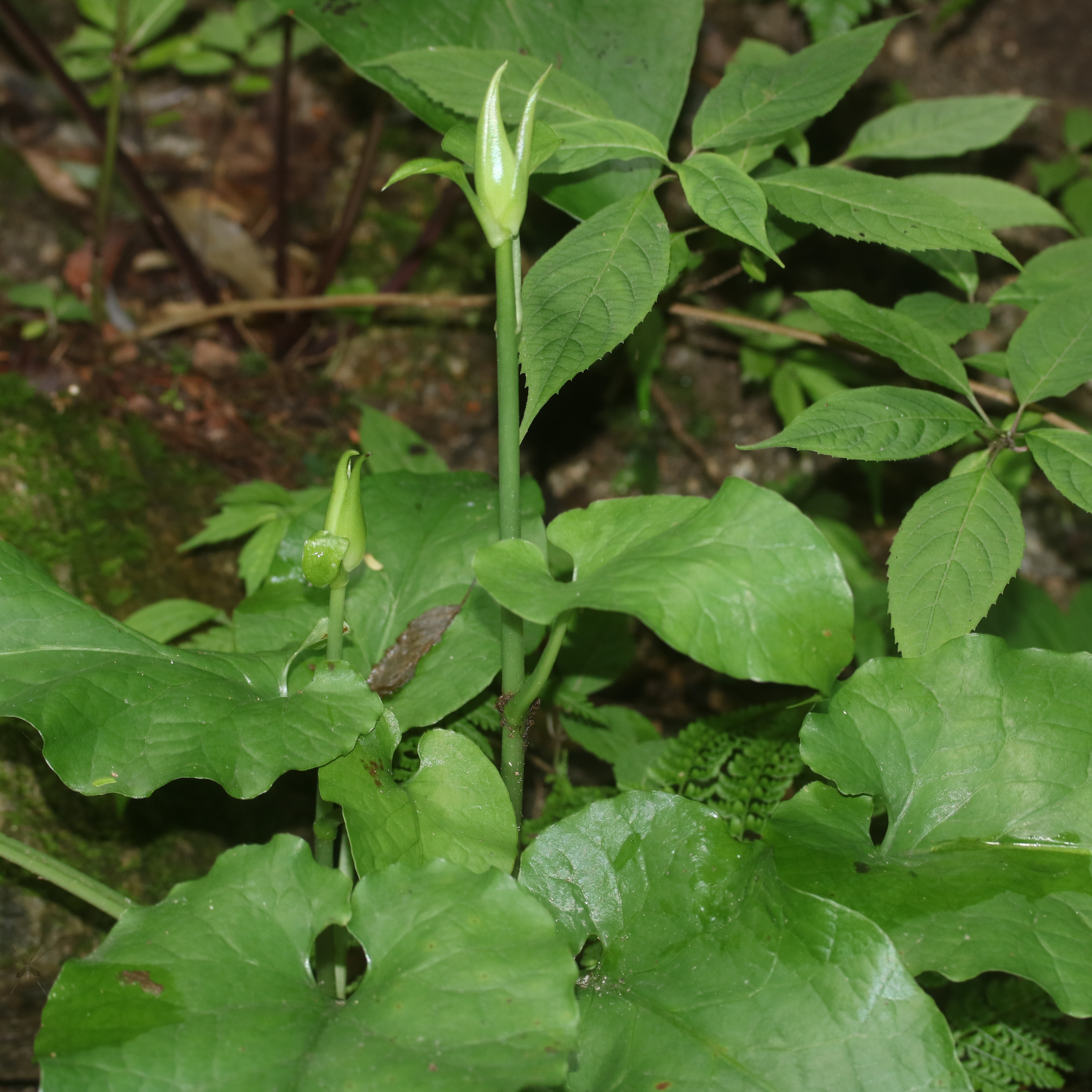
Cardiocrinum cordatum plant.

The Ainu word for the fourth month of the lunar calendar is mo kiwtacup, which translates to “soon to be time to dig up turep month”, while the fifth month is si kiwtacup, or “digging up turep month”. This was the time when Ainu women would take their sacks (saranip) and digging sticks (itani) and head into the mountains to gather the bulbs. The gathered bulbs were processed into starch using the following method.

1. Remove leaves and roots from the bulb, peel the scales off one by one, and rinse in water.
2. Place the scales in a large bucket. Grind until a sticky paste is formed using the head of a hatchet as a pestle. Pour large quantities of water into the bucket and let sit for about two days.
3. Fine fibers and skins will float to the surface of the water forming a scum after a few days have passed and the starch will settle to the bottom. The fibrous scum is removed and set aside for use in on turep. The starch collected on the bottom of the bucket is divided into two types of starch: the semi-liquid secondary starch and the powdered primary starch.

These two types of starch were dried and preserved, but before that, they were also used to make fresh foods. The primary starch was mixed with water and poured into the hollow of plant stems from the Japanese knotweed (kuttar) or Parasenecio hastatus (wakkakutu) and placed into the ashes of a fire to cook into a thin noodle-like shape. The secondary starch was formed into round dumplings, wrapped in the leaves of the Japanese butterbur (korkoni) or magnolia (pusni), then placed in the ashes of a fire to bake. They were then eaten with salmon roe or animal fats.

The secondary starch was the one which was used on a daily basis once it had been dried for preservation. It was often formed into dumplings and added to sayo. The primary starch was rarely eaten, instead being reserved for gifts or used as medicine.

It was considered taboo to speak of alcohol or love affairs while working on any part of the starch making process. It was said such discussions would agitate the starch and it would fail to settle properly.

=== On turep ===
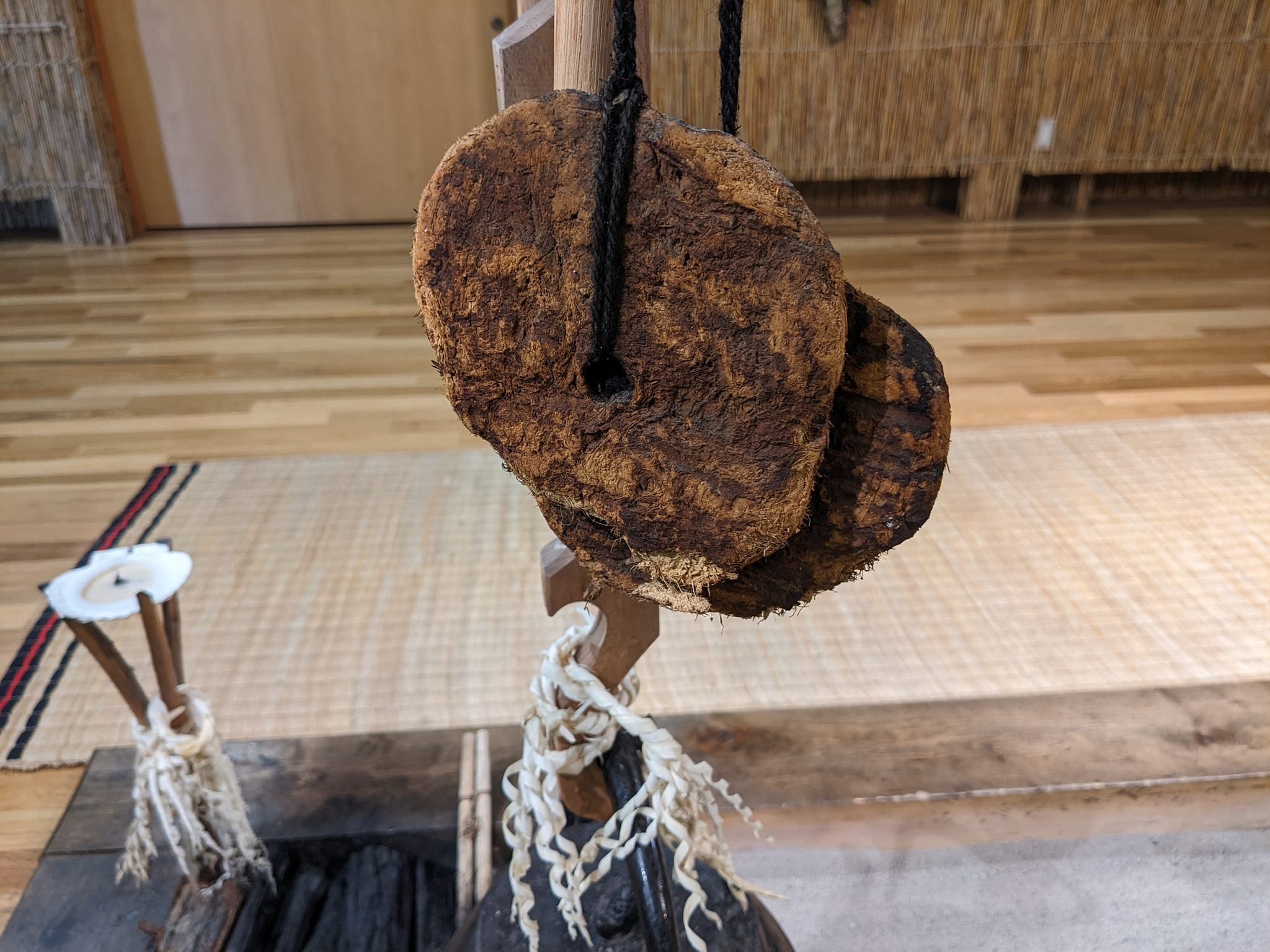
On turep

On turep translates as “fermented turep”. It is a preserved food fermented from the fiber and skin byproduct of the turep starch extraction process. It was made using the following method.

1. A sieve (icari) is used to gather the fiber and skins that float in or on the water after the turep bulbs have been crushed and soaked in water.
2. The water is thoroughly wrung from the fiber, then it is wrapped in leaves from the Japanese butterbur (korkoni) or Parasenecio hastatus (wakkakutu) and left to ferment for three to ten days. This fermenting process is called “on”.
3. The fermented product is ground thoroughly with a mortar and pestle. Once pounded, it is kneaded, formed into donut-like shapes, and dried.
4. A cord is passed through the center and the on turep is stored hung from a rack above the hearth.

The on turep was eaten by smashing and rehydrating it to form into dumplings and placed in sayo.

=== Pocche-imo ===
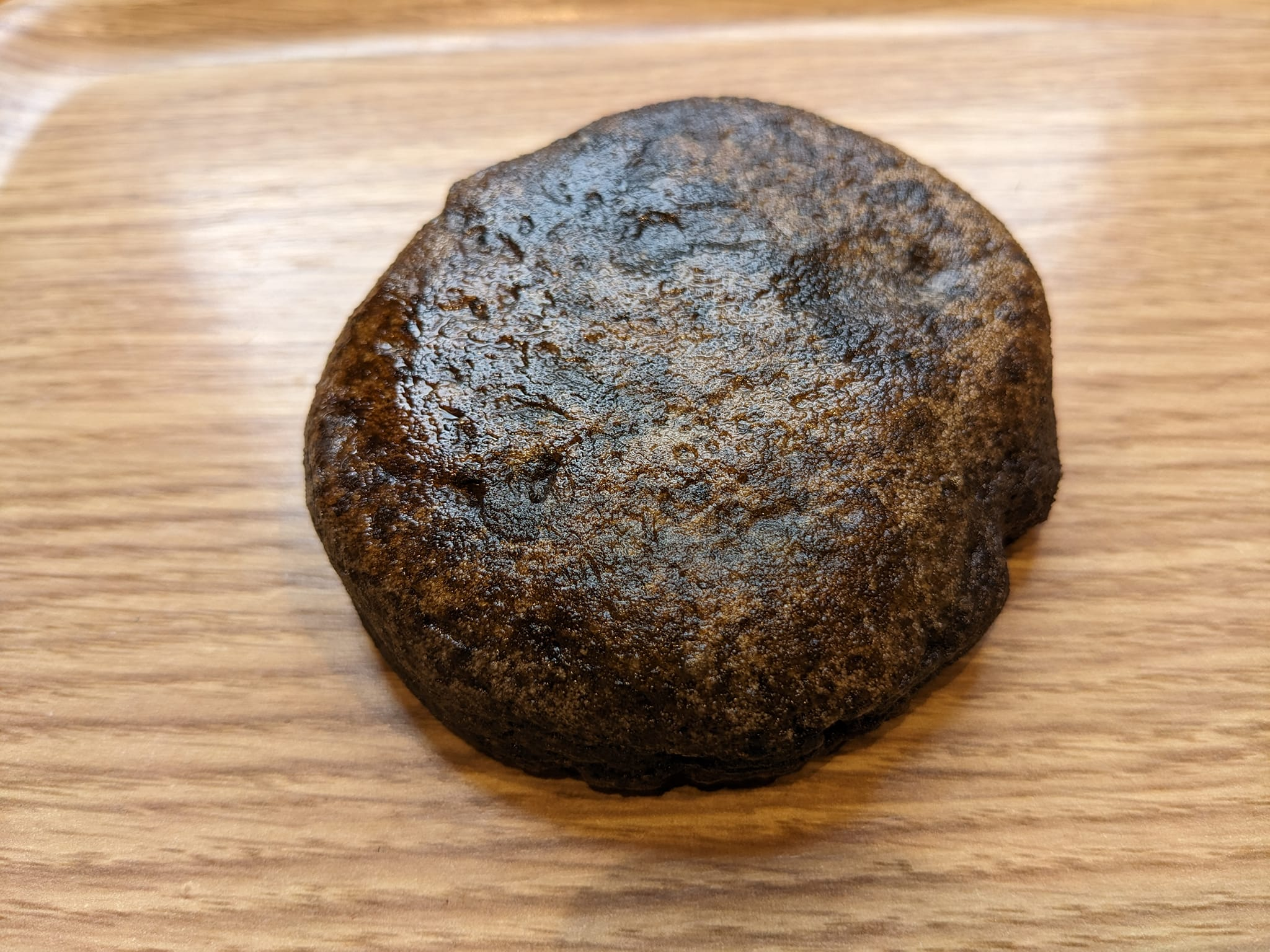
Pocche-imo dumpling

Pocche-imo is a preserved potato food also known as penekoshoi-imo or munini-imo. The process involved uses the extreme cold of Hokkaidō in a fashion similar to the production of chuño in South America.

Once potatoes were harvested in the fall, the poorly shaped and small potatoes were left outside. The winter's cold would soon come and freeze the potatoes, which would thaw again in spring. This process of freezing and thawing would break down the structure of the potatoes, turning them soft. Once in that state, the potatoes were soaked in water and thawed completely. The starch that settled to the bottom of the water was collected, formed into spheres, and arranged in a warm place to ferment. This resulted in a fine textured potato flour. The flour was formed into cakes and baked in the ashes of the fire, then bear fat or cipor (salmon roe) was added and together placed in sayo to eat. In modern times with the influence of ethnic Japanese culture, it became more common to flavor pocche-imo with artificial flavorings such as saccharin then deep fry them. The fried product is then eaten with nori or a mixture of sugar and soy sauce.

== Commodities ==
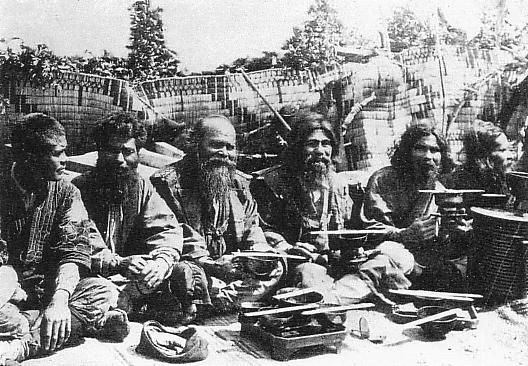
A group of men offering alcohol to the gods during an iomante ceremony that took place in 1930. The alcohol in the bowls (itanki) placed on top of the serving trays (otcike) or tea bowl stands (takaysara) is delivered to the heavens through the ikupasuy (the spatula-shaped utensil over the bowls). On the right, there is a lacquerware container (sintoko) used in the preparation of the alcohol.

=== Alcohol ===
Words for alcohol in the Ainu language include sake, tonoto, and askur. The word sake is a loanword from Japanese, and tonoto is also a word developed under Japanese influence as it originally referred to food or beverages given by an influential Japanese person, who was called a ton. Ainu alcohol is an undistilled alcohol made from Japanese millet that is similar in appearance and flavor to homebrewed sake.

All alcohol was produced by the women. Virtuous, respected katkemat (ladies/wives) from nearby were considered suitable for leading the task. Conversely, young women, particularly those during menokotasum (menstruation, literally translated as “women sickness”) were considered impure and did not assist.

The ingredients considered best for making alcohol were Japanese millet (piyapa) or proso millet (menkul). First, the grains were heated in a large pot with water until a porridge formed. Once cool to the touch, malt was mixed in. The Ainu either acquired malted grain from trade with the Japanese or they produced their own by boiling Japanese millet, acorns, and Cardiocrinum cordatum then sprinkling powdered bark from the Cercidiphyllum tree on the finished product. Furthermore, the Ainu word for malt, kamtaci, is the same as the old Japanese word for malted rice, kamutachi.

The alcohol was stored in a lacquered vessel (sintoko) and left to set in hot embers as a warding against evil. Using a portion of Apehuci-kamuy, the goddess of fire, like this would protect the alcohol from evil spirits, and was a prayer for the success of the alcohol making process. As an additional warding against evil spirits, a hatchet (tasiro) or an Ainu blade (emus) was placed atop the sintoko as it was left to set for ten days near the kamuy puyar, the window furthest inside the cise, which was considered sacred. Once the alcohol had fermented enough, the spent coals were returned to the hearth and the mash was strained through a sieve (icari) to remove the lees (sirari) and finish the alcohol. It was stirred using a sake ladle (sake-pisakku), ladled into a spouted bowl (etosup), then poured into bowls (itanki). When offering alcohol to the spirits, an ikupasuy, a ceremonial stick, was dipped into a bowl of sake set on a takaysara, a bowl stand. The alcohol on the ikupasuy was then spread onto the inau. It was believed that by going through the ikupasuy, one drop of alcohol in the human world would become an entire barrel of alcohol in the spirit world. The Ainu said that alcohol was something that everyone enjoyed, along with the spirits. Drinking alone was not an option.

The Ainu of the Hidaka region, such as those near Shizunai, had a legend that tsunami spirits hated lees, so they spread the lees around their homes to ward off tsunamis.

=== Drinks ===
==== Tea ====
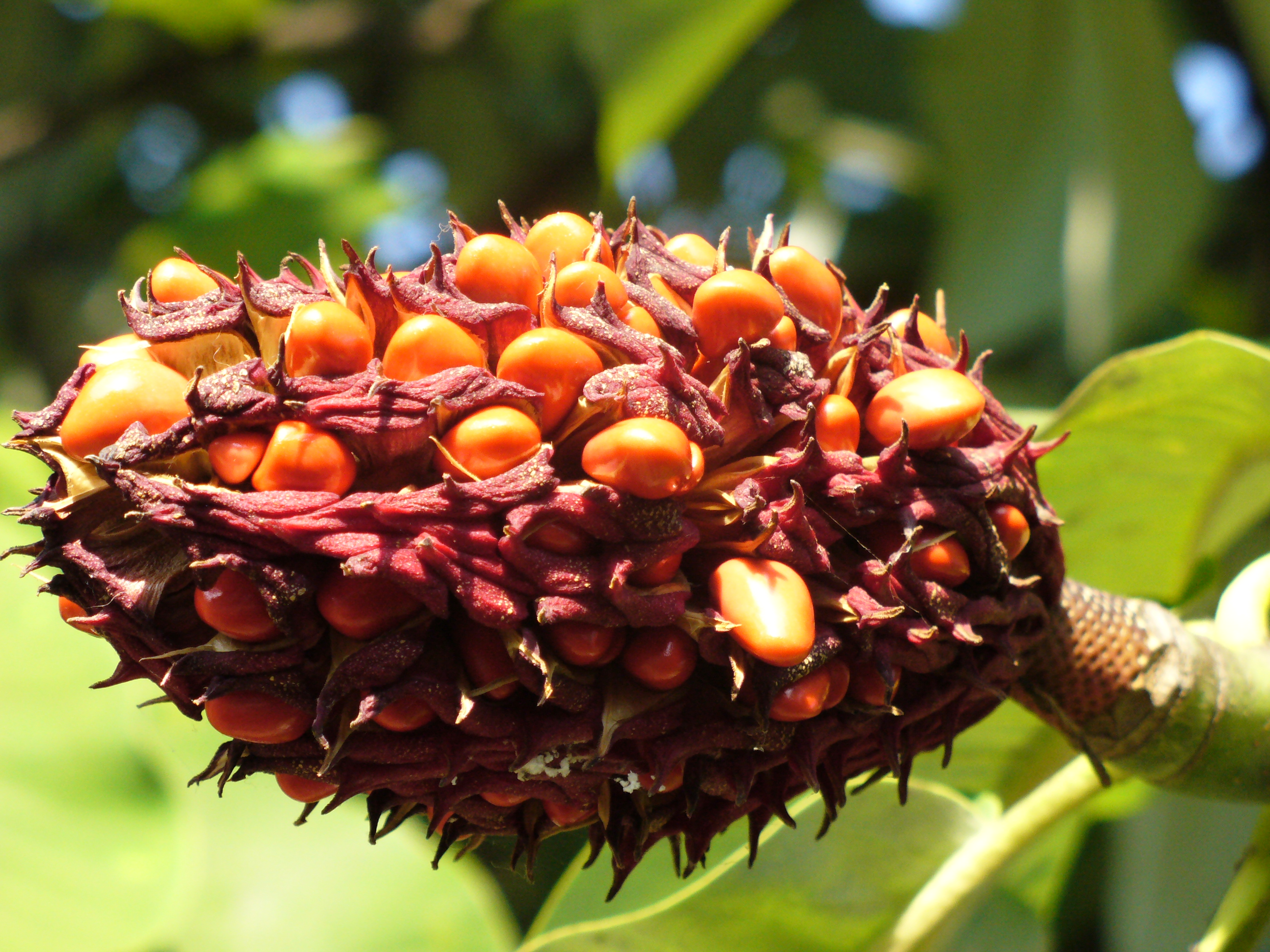
A seed of the Japanese bigleaf magnolia, steeped to make a drink.

The teas drunk by Ainu were not made with the evergreen Camellia sinensis, but from the seeds and bark of trees, or medicinal herbs native to the cool climate of Hokkaidō.

The Ainu would brew various plant materials to make tea such as Japanese bigleaf magnolia (pusni) twigs and seeds, kobushi magnolia (omawkusni) twigs and seeds, Lindera umbellata twigs (sumnuhas), bird cherry (kikinni) bark, Ledum palustre leaves (haspo), Vietnamese balm stems and leaves (ento), Libanotis coreana roots (upew), Heracleum lanatum (pittok) roots, and Angelica genuflexa (munusi) roots.Cinnamomum camphora (ciprasu) which grows along the coast was used in a similar way. In the Sakhalin region, drinks were made of boiled Ledum palustre (nuxca) stems and leaves, Rose rugosa (otaruxni), and Rubus matsumuranus (kinakaoxni) stems and leaves.

Japanese tea imported from Honshu has become widespread in modern times.

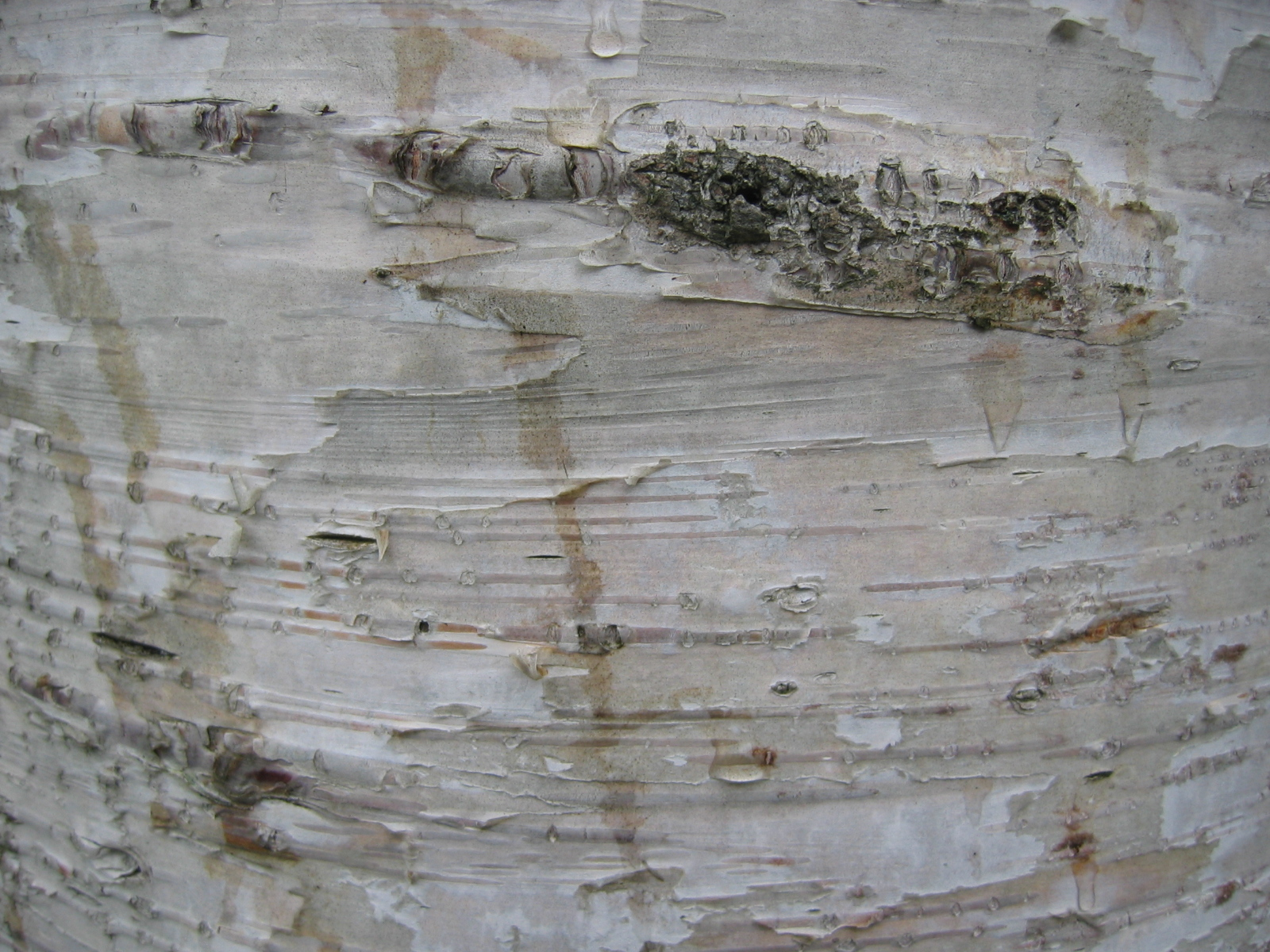
Trunk of a white birch. The sap is consumed as a beverage, while the oily bark is stripped and braided in order to make torches.

==== Tree sap ====
There are some trees native to Hokkaidō that contain a sweet sap. The Ainu used the sap of these trees (niwakka, literally translated as “tree water”) as a drink and flavoring for foods.

Large amounts of sap run from the trunk of the white birch (kapattatni) if it is damaged in the summer. This sap is called tatni wakka and was used as water for cooking when there was none available in the area. A drink was also made by adding chopped Symplocarpus nipponicus to the sap along with flavoring. The Sakhalin Ainu would make alcohol by placing set white birch sap into blackcurrant juice and leaving it to ferment.

The painted maple (topeni, meaning “milk tree”) is related to the sugar maple of North America. A sweet sap flows from the trunk if it is damaged. The trunks would be scored during the winter to make “sap icicles” that were eaten like popsicles. The sap was also boiled down to create a sweetener. This was then boiled with beans or water chestnuts to make a high-quality rataskep. Sap fell out of use along with the influx of sugar during the Meiji Period, but it experienced a temporary resurgence during the shortages of World War II.

== Utensils and eating habits ==
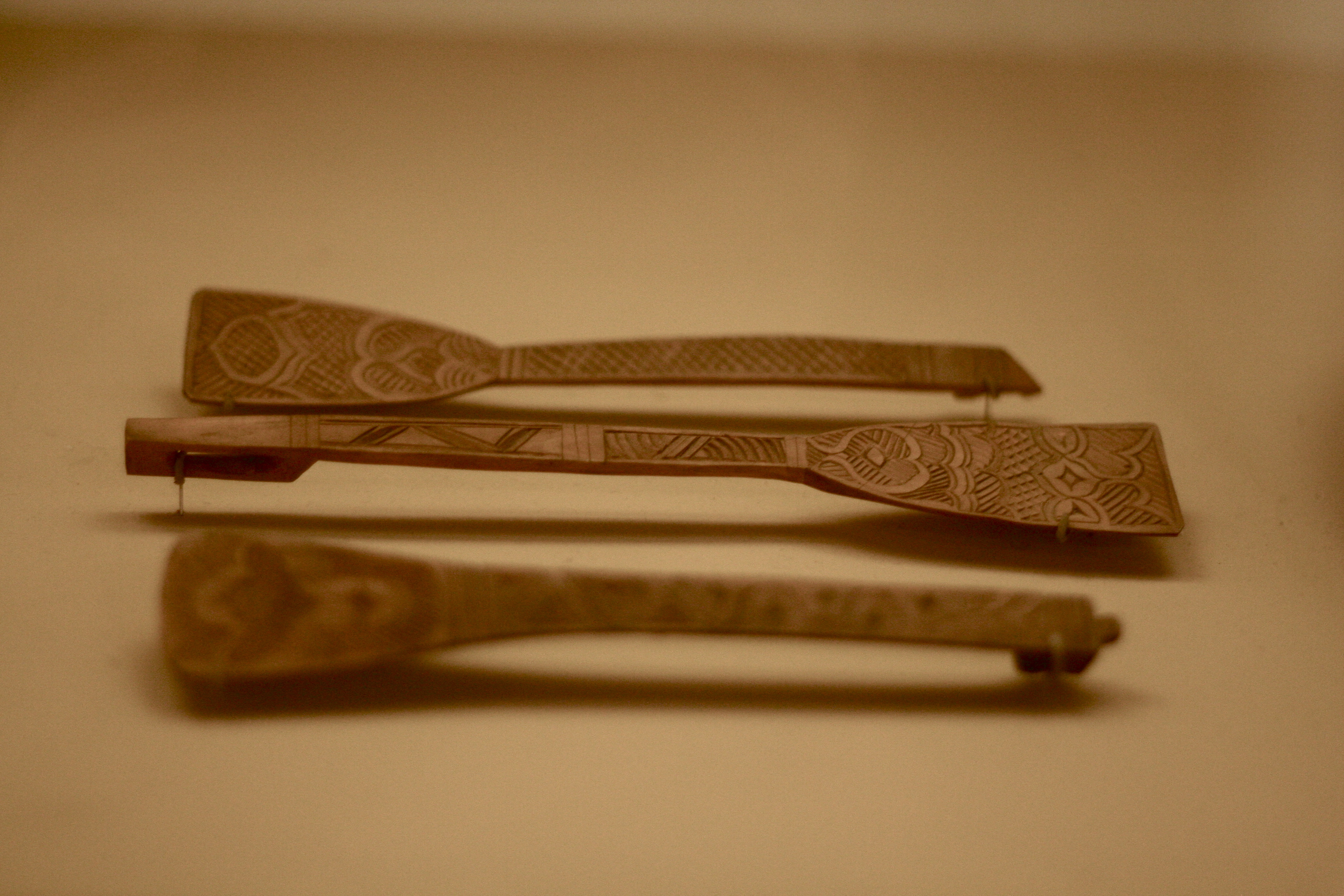
Ainu spoons, parapasuy

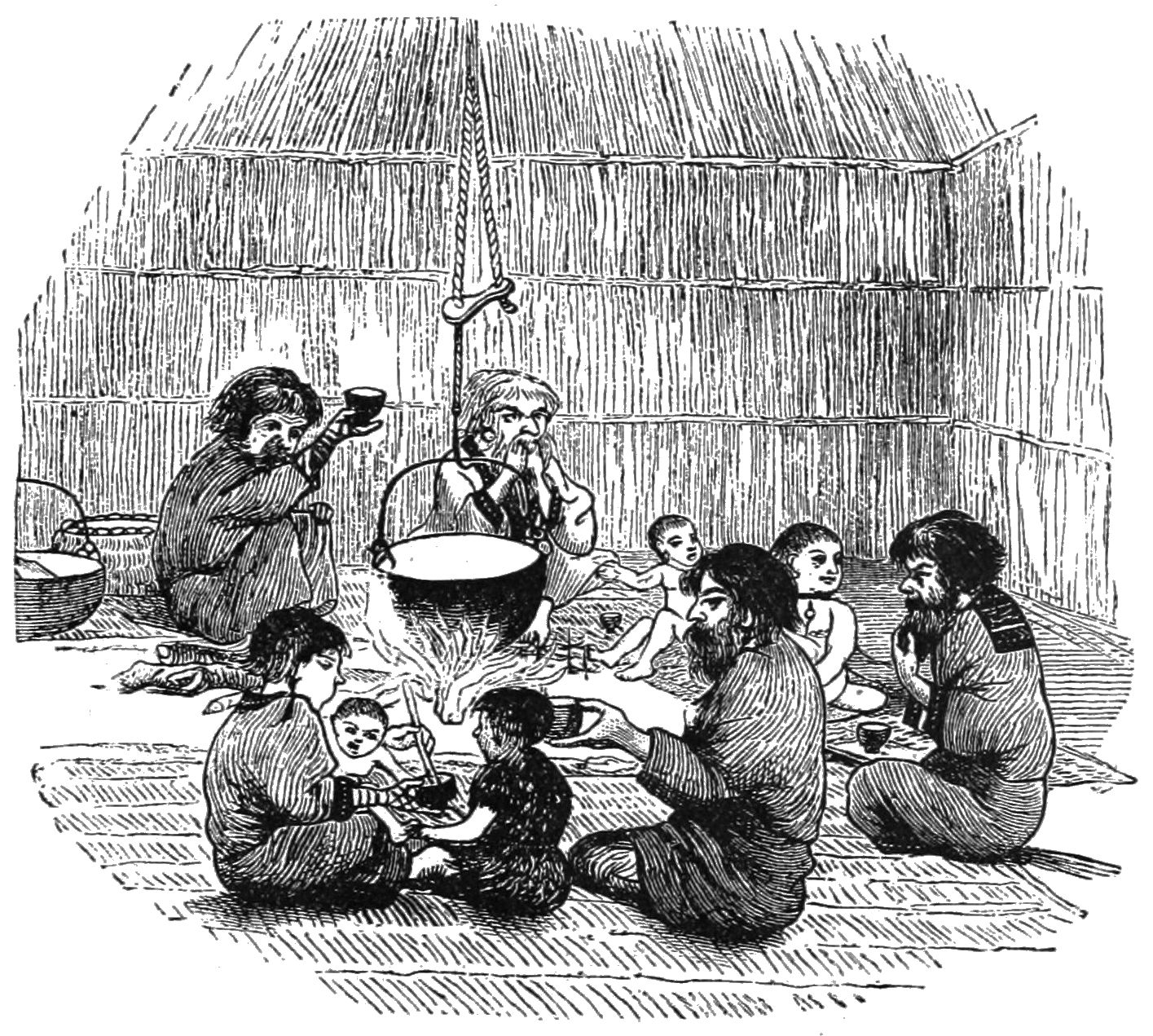
A sketch of an Ainu meal scene by Isabella Bird.

“Meal” in Ainu is “ipe”. Traditionally, two meals were eaten per day, breakfast (kunneywa ipe) and dinner (onuman ipe), and a third meal, lunch (tokes ipe), was added during the Taisho period. A night meal (kunne ipe) was sometimes eaten during night fishing or other late activities.

Food was transferred from the cooking pot using a ladle (kasup) into a lacquerware bowl (itanki) for eating. These bowls were obtained through trade with the ethnic Japanese and were large enough to hold 400 ml worth of food. Chunks of meat or fish that were too large to fit in the bowl were placed on mats woven from reeds. Items such as fish roasted on a spit or sito were eaten by hand, but otherwise, most foods were eaten with chopsticks (pasuy) or spoons (parapasuy). Parapasuy translated literally means “wide chopstick”. Both spoons and chopsticks were carved from wood.

When guests were over for food, the head woman of the house would offer food and say “ipeyan” (please eat). The guest would express their gratitude, and, if it were a valuable meal such as bear meat, they would raise the food to their forehead in thanks before beginning. However, the family would not say anything before eating if there were no guests. Once finished, it was customary to say “hunna” to express their gratitude for the food.

Similar to the ethnic Japanese, it was considered polite to eat all food that was provided. Because of this, it was considered polite to use one's finger to wipe the remaining sauce from inside the bowl and lick it. This custom is the reason for the Ainu name for the pointer finger, “itanki kem atsukep”, literally meaning “bowl-licking finger”.

== Bibliography ==
- Kayano, Shigeru (萱野茂) (1996). 萱野茂のアイヌ語辞典 (Kayano Shigeru no ainu go jiten). Sanseidō.
- Batchelor, John (1905). Ainu-English-Japanese Dictionary: (including A Grammar of the Ainu Language. London: Methodist Publishing House.
- Batchelor, John; Miyabe, Kingo (1893), "Ainu economic plants", Transactions of the Asiatic Society of Japan, 221: 198–240
