= Rur =

Rur or RUR may refer to:

- Rur (river), a tributary of the Meuse, mostly in Germany
- R.U.R., a 1920 Czech sci-fi play by Karel Čapek
- R.U.R. (film), an upcoming science fiction musical film, based on the play
- Russian ruble, a currency (pre-1998 ISO 4217 code: RUR)
- Ohaw, or rur, a Japanese soup dish
- Rur., an abbreviation for "rural"
- Royal Ulster Rifles, a British Army regiment (1793–1968)
- Rugby Union of Russia, a sports governing body (founded 1936)
- Eric (robot) or R.U.R., a 1928 British humanoid robot
- RUR-PLE, a 2004 educational Python programming tool

== See also ==
- RIR (disambiguation)
- Roar (disambiguation)
- Röhr (disambiguation)—including another German river
- Ruhr (disambiguation)—including another German river
