= Linor =

Linor is a female given name. Notable people with the name include:

- Linor Abargil (born 1980), Israeli lawyer, actress, model, and beauty queen
- Linor Goralik (born 1975), Russian author, poet, and essayist
