= Ohaw =

Savory soup of the Ainu people

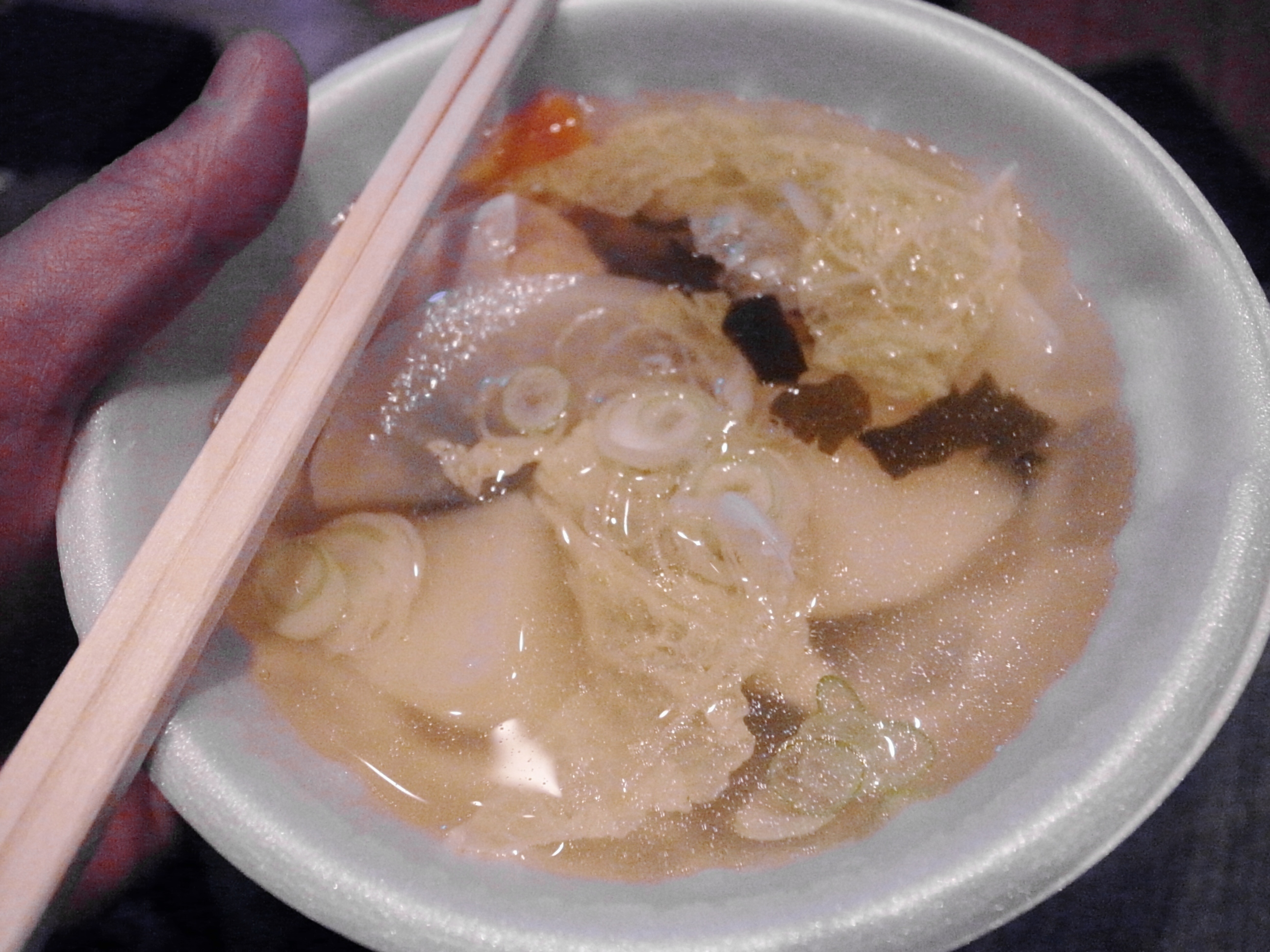
- Alternative names: Rur
- Type: Fish soup
- Place of origin: Japan
- Main ingredients: Stock, fish or animal bones, kelp; meat, fish, or vegetables

Ohaw or rur is a savory soup of Ainu cuisine, a dish of the Ainu people of northern Japan, flavored with fish or animal bones. Kelp is also used to add flavor to the stock. Unlike the majority of the traditional Japanese soups, the Ainu do not use miso or soy sauce in their soups. The solid ingredients such as meat, fish, vegetables and/or wild edible plants are added to the stock.

== Variants ==
- Cep ohaw - salmon soup
- Kam ohaw - meat soup
- Yuk ohaw - venison soup
- Pukusa ohaw - pukusa soup
- pukusakina ohaw - anemone soup

== See also ==
- List of Japanese soups and stews
