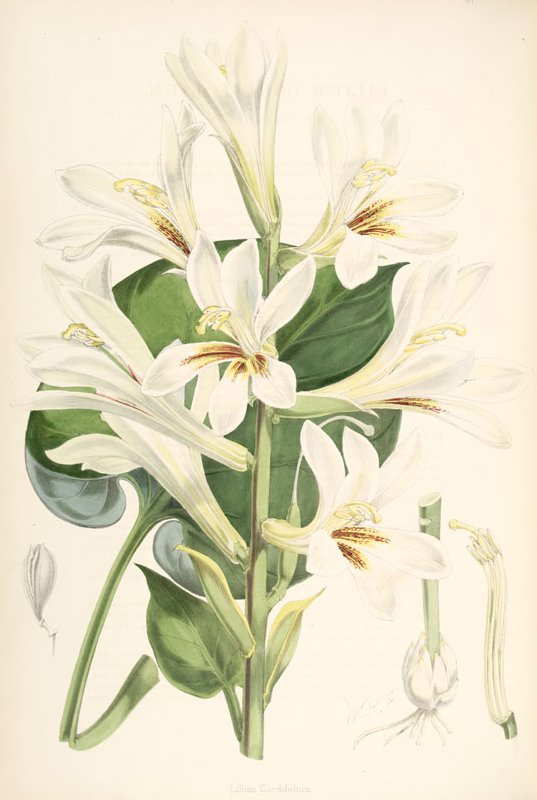
- Cardiocrinum cordatum

Scientific classification
- Kingdom: Plantae
- Clade: Embryophytes
- Clade: Tracheophytes
- Clade: Angiosperms
- Clade: Monocots
- Order: Liliales
- Family: Liliaceae
- Subfamily: Lilioideae
- Genus: Cardiocrinum
- Species: C. cordatum

Binomial name
- Cardiocrinum cordatum (Thunb.) Makino

Synonyms
- Synonymy: Hemerocallis cordata Thunb.; Libertia heteroclita Dumort.; Lilium cordatum (Thunb.) Koidz. & Airy Shaw; Lilium cordifolium Thunb.; Hemerocallis cordifolia (Thunb.) Salisb.; Saussurea cordifolia (Thunb.) Salisb.; Lilium glehnii F.Schmidt; Cardiocrinum glehnii (F.Schmidt) Makino

= Cardiocrinum cordatum =

Species of flowering plant

Cardiocrinum cordatum, known as turep in the Ainu languages, is a Northeast Asian species of plant in the lily family. It is native to Japan and to certain Russian islands in the Sea of Okhotsk (Sakhalin, Kuril Islands).

Because of its large, showy flowers, Cardiocrinum cordatum is sometimes cultivated as an ornamental in regions outside its native range, though not as frequently as the related C. giganteum.

The Ainu, a group indigenous to Hokkaido, harvested the bulbs. Starch was extracted and used to create a form of dumpling, a staple of Ainu cuisine.

The plant has reportedly become naturalized in the State of Maryland, in the eastern United States.
