= Roar (disambiguation) =

A roar is a deep resonating sound produced by animals.

Roar may also refer to:

== Film and television ==
- Roar (film), a 1981 American adventure-comedy film starring Tippi Hedren and Melanie Griffith
- Roar: Tigers of the Sundarbans, a 2014 Hindi-language Indian animal horror feature film
- Roar (1997 TV series), a television drama set in 4th century Ireland
- Roar (2006 TV series), a CBBC television series about the animals in a zoo
- Roar (2022 TV series), an anthology series on Apple TV+ based on Cecilia Ahern's short story collection
- Roar (TV network), a digital multicast television network

== Music ==
- "Roar" (song), a 2013 song by Katy Perry
- Rrröööaaarrr, a 1986 album by Voivod
- Roar (musician), a solo musical project of Arizona-based musician Owen Evans
- "Roar", a 2013 song by Axwell and Sebastian Ingrosso from the soundtrack of Monsters University
- "Roar", a 2010 song by Treat from the album Coup De Grace
- "Roar!", a 2008 instrumental by Michael Giacchino from the film Cloverfield

== Print ==
- ROAR Magazine, an independent online publication
- Roar! (newspaper), the King's College London student newspaper
- The Roar (novel), a 2008 novel by Emma Clayton
- Roar (short story collection), a 2018 short story collection by Cecelia Ahern

== Acronyms ==
- Radio Operated Auto Racing, the sanctioning body of competitive radio controlled car racing in the United States and Canada
  - ROAR National Championships
- Registry of Open Access Repositories, an index and search engine
- Restore Our Alienated Rights, a Boston organization formed to oppose desegregation busing
- Rise Organise and Rebuild Guyana, a political party in Guyana
- Reach Out and Read, an American organization that advocates for childhood literacy
- ROAR: Resistance and Opposition Arts Review, Russian magazine

== People ==
- Roar (given name), a masculine Norwegian given name
- Roar (Dane), a Danish man in the Gesta Danorum
- Roar, a dubious legendary king of Denmark; see Hrothgar

== Other uses ==
- Roar (roller coaster), at Six Flags America and formerly Six Flags Discovery Kingdom
- ROAR! Rock of Angels Records, Greek music label
- The Roar (website), an Australian sports opinion site
- Brisbane Roar FC, an Australian football club (formerly Queensland Roar FC)
- The Rower, County Kilkenny, Ireland, once named Roar

== See also ==
- Curling, also known as "the roaring game"
