= Ruhr (disambiguation) =

The Ruhr (German Ruhrgebiet) is an urban and industrial area in North Rhine-Westphalia, Germany.

It may also refer to:

- Ruhr (river), a river that runs through the area
- Ruhr (film), 2009, by director James Benning
- Ruhr, the German word for dysentery, an inflammatory disorder of the intestine
- Ruhr (A 64), a former Rhein class replenishment ship of the German Navy
- "Ruhr of India", valley of the Damodar River

== See also ==
- Rur, a river that flows through the Netherlands, Belgium and Germany
- Rur (disambiguation)
