= All Who Are Capable Of Breathing The Breath =

2019 Russian book

- Author: Linor Goralik
- Original title: Все, способные дышать дыхание
- Language: Russian
- Genre: Literary fiction
- Publisher: AST (publisher)
- Publication date: 2019
- ISBN: 978-5-17-112269-0

All Who Are Capable Of Breathing The Breath (Russian: Все, способные дышать дыхание) is a novel by Linor Goralik. It was first published in 2019 by AST. The novel was awarded the NOS literary prize and was shortlisted for both the Big Book award and the Andrei Bely Prize in 2019.

== Plot ==
The plot of the novel chronicles life in Israel following the 'ason' (from Hebrew: catastrophe), a tragic event that triggered a series of bizarre new phenomena, including the "Rainbow Disease", sandy storms called "busha-ve-hirpah", and, central to the story, the ability of animals to speak. Some species, such as racoons, learn quickly and grow more intelligent, while others remain animals, capable of speech but unintelligent. It becomes necessary for humanity coexist with animals and take their perspectives into account. In these conditions, animals are able to hate, suffer, and think like humans. The plot of the story revolves around how people are to survive in this world and remain good people, and the difficulties some will encounter in attempting to do so.
