= Hardy kiwi =

Hardy kiwi is the name of a fruit product and common name of several species of the genus Actinidia:

- Actinidia arguta, the ″hardy kiwi″, a perennial vine native to Japan, Korea, Northern China, and Russian Far East
- Actinidia kolomikta, the ″kolomikta″ or ″variegated-leaf hardy kiwi″
