= Linor Goralik =

Israeli writer (born 1975)

- Линор Горалик
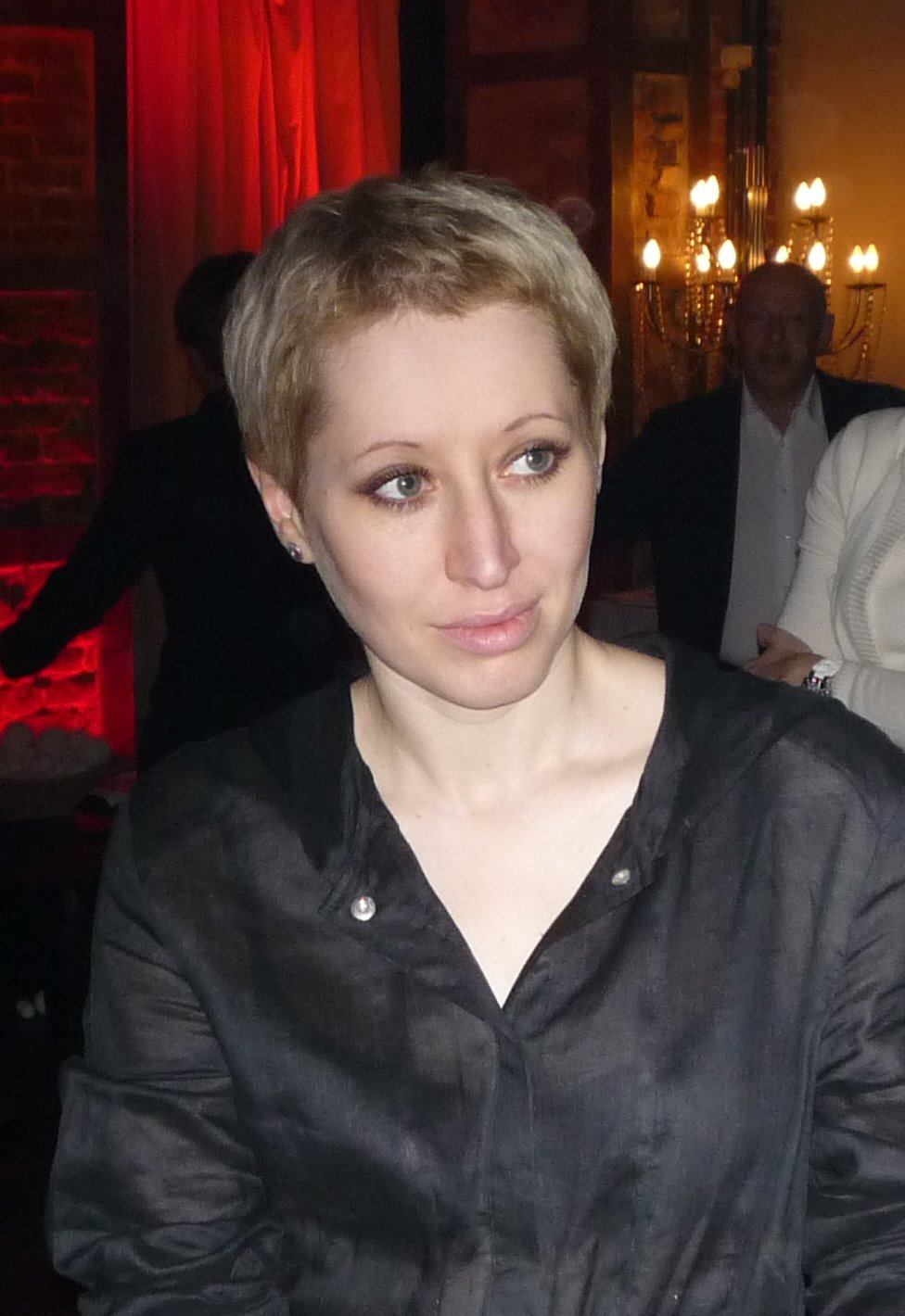
- Goralik in 2009
- Born: Yuliya Borisovna Goralik; 1975 (age 50–51); Dnepropetrovsk, Ukrainian SSR, Soviet Union
- Occupations: Poet; artist; essayist
- Years active: 1999–present

Linor Goralik (Russian: Лино́р Гора́лик; born Yuliya Borisovna Goralik; Russian: Юлия Борисовна Горалик on 9 July 1975) is an Israeli author, poet, artist, essayist and marketing specialist.

== Biography ==
=== Early years and family ===
She was born on 9 July 1975 in a Jewish family in Dnipropetrovsk, in the Ukrainian SSR of the Soviet Union (now Dnipro in Ukraine).

Her family emigrated to Israel in 1989. In her interviews she said that she became seriously interested in mathematics at the age of 10. She studied computer science from 1991 to 1994 at Ben-Gurion University of the Negev in Beersheba.

In 1999, with the help of Alexander Zhitinsky she published her first book of poetry.

=== Moscow period ===
Goralik lived in Moscow from 2000 to 2014. She worked there as a journalist and marketing analyst. At that period she translated works of Etgar Keret and Vytautas Pliura (with Stanislav Lvovsky). She also started working in cultural marketing, with Stanislav Lvovsky she organized several art exhibitions and projects, bringing contemporary Israeli culture to Moscow.

== Lecturing and Appearances (selected) ==
Conference of Fashion, Consumption and Everyday Culture in the Soviet Union between 1945 and 1985 (Salzburg, 2013): Red Devils and White Rabbits: Identity, Compliance and Rebellion in the Late Soviet Masquerade (report/paper);

Cultural Research: Values, Institutions, Reflections ( Moscow, 2007 ): The Evil Seed: ‘Bad Child in Contemporary Cinema’ (report/paper);

Fashion Theory Magazine & MMOMA Leuctorium (Moscow, 2016): The Shameful Dream: Feeling of Inadequacy in Everyday Costume (lecture);

The Moscow School of Social and Economic Science (Moscow, 2016): Respect The Wry - Faced: Clothes and Accessories That Distort Human Form (lecture);

Fashion and Socializm: New Approaches ( Moscow, 2007 ): Merry Lights on Christmas Tree: Bourgeoisie Fantasy In contemporary Russian Branding (report/paper);

Mother and Harlot: Jerusalem as a Woman ( Jerusalem, 2015 ): panel on “modest fashion” in today’s Israeli culture;

Edinburgh World Writers' Conference ( Krasnoyarsk , 2012): Costume in Contemporary Russian Literature, discussion (moderator)

As a teacher, she taught marketing at the Stockholm School of Economics and fashion theory at the Institute of Humanities Historical and Theoretical Studies at the Higher School of Economics.

She is a regular contributor to the magazines Teoriya Modi (‘Fashion Theory’), New Literary Review, she also has a column on the cultural studies of contemporary costume in the newspaper Vedomosti.

=== Personal Exhibitions (Selected) ===
In 2002, she held her personal exhibition titled "Pity without looking" at the Marat Gelman gallery.

In 2017 - Theory of The Everyday (Moscow, Fashion and Design Center).

In 2021, Dressing Demons ( Moscow, Art4 Museum of Contemporary Art )

=== The Hare named FML ===
In 2006, she created a series of comics about ‘the Hare named FML’ (in Russian mat, his name is abbreviated ‘pizdetz’). In the scenes, the protagonist encounters his imaginary friends, their dialogs are full of sad irony and ‘touching cynicism’. As Goralik puts it, ‘he is about politics and everyday survival’.

== Awards and recognition ==
Joseph Brodsky’s Memorial Award, Poetry – Laureate, 2016

FJC‘s Fiddler on The Roof Award for Children’s Literature – Laureate, 2013;

Portal Award for Fiction and Science Fiction Портал_(конвент) – Laureate, 2012;

Russian National Triumph award (Young Generation), Poetry - Laureate, 2003

== Activism ==
In February 2013 she recorded an address in support of the Russian LGBT community.

After the 2014 annexation of Crimea she returned to Israel, but continued to travel between the two countries until November 2021. She is a vocal opponent to Vladimir Putin's regime and to the 2022 Russian invasion of Ukraine. In August 2023 Goralik was added to Russia's list of ‘foreign agents’, according to the Russian Ministry of Justice Goralik had spoken out against Russia’s “special military operation in Ukraine” (Russia's official term for the invasion of Ukraine) and had "created or disseminated materials for foreign agents.”.

In 2022, she created ROAR: Resistance and Opposition Arts Review, a bimonthly online publication that publishes politically oriented poetry, essays, prose, plays, as well as visual art and multimedia projects and music. ROAR speaks out against Putin’s regime, war, repression, violence and propaganda. The Novosti26 project she established later that year "speaks about Russian politics so that everyone — from age 13 and up — can see why it is personally".

== Personal life ==
Goralik confesses that she has bipolar disorder, which she is treating with the help of a psychologist, psychotherapist and medication.

She is bisexual.

== Works ==
- The Book of Quotations, "Цитатник" (poems, 1999, ISBN 5-7559-0048-5)
- Outsiders, "Не местные" (2003, ISBN 5-94128-071-8)
- The Tale About The Northern Lights, "Сказка о северном сиянии" (with Yuriy Sorochkin) (2003)
- The Tale About Fairy Metal, "Сказка о волшебном металле". (with Yuriy Sorochkin) (2004)
- No (alternative English title - PG-21), "Нет" (novel, with Sergey Kuznetsov, 2004, ISBN 5-94278-419-1)
- Half the Sky, "Половина неба" (novel, with Stanislav Lvovsky, ISBN 5-94145-266-7)
- Speaks, "Говорит" (2004, ISBN 5-94128-090-4)
- Meals not for Kids, "Недетская еда" (2004, ISBN 5-94282-231-X)
- The Book of Lonelinesses, "Книга одиночеств" (2004, with Max Frei)
- A Hollow Woman. Barbie's World Inside and Outside, "Полая женщина. Мир Барби: изнутри и снаружи" (2005, ISBN 5-86793-418-7)
- Martin Isn't Crying, "Мартин не плачет" (fable, 2007, ISBN 5-86793-508-6)
- Pull the Hook Hard, Petrusha, "Подсекай, Петруша" (poems, 2007, ISBN 5-86856-139-2)
- Meals not for Kids. Without Desserts, "Недетская еда. Без сладкого" (2007, ISBN 978-5-94282-408-2)
- The Hare Named FML, "Заяц ПЦ" (comics, 2007, ISBN 978-5-9689-0099-9)
- The Hare Named FML 2.0, "Заяц ПЦ 2.0" (comics, 2008)
- In Short, "Короче" (flash fiction, 2008, ISBN 978-5-86793-617-4)
- Agatha Goes Home, "Агата возвращается домой" (fable, 2008, ISBN 978-5-9689-0150-7)
- The Hare Named FML 3.0, "Заяц ПЦ 3.0" (comics, 2008), reissue (2011)
- Valery, "Валерий" (novelette, 2011)
- The Folklore of the Sector M1 Inhabitants, "Устное народное творчество обитателей сектора М1" (flash fiction and poems, 2011)
- The Bible Zoo, "Библейский зоопарк". Серия "Чейсовская коллекция" (М.: Текст, 2012)
- A Guide to Israel (only and exclusively) for Kids, "Путеводитель по Израилю (только и исключительно) для детей" (M.: Текст, 2013)
- Private Persons. Biographies of Poets Told by Themselves, "Частные лица. Биографии поэтов, рассказанные ими самими" (M.: Новое литературное обозрение, 2013)
- So It Was A Whistle, "Так это был гудочек" (poems, Ozolnieki: Literature Without Borders, 2015, ISBN 978-9934-14-555-1)
- Found Life: Poems, Stories, Comics, a Play, and an Interview (Columbia University Press, 2017). Edited by Ainsley Morse, Maria Vassileva, and Maya Vinokour. ISBN 978-023118351-2)
- Agatha Looks Up, "Агата смотрит вверх" (М.: Livebook, 2017)
- The Vespers Beast, "Всенощная зверь" (poems, Ozolnieki: Literature Without Borders, 2019)
- A Guide to Israel, "Путеводитель по Израилю" (М., 2019)
- The 203 Stories About The Dresses, "203 истории про платья" (with Maria Voul) (М., 2019)
- The Cold Water of Venisana, "Холодная вода Венисаны" (young adult fantasy, M.: Livebook, 2019); second edition, 2021
- All who are capable of breathing the breath, Все, Способные дышать дыхание (М.: АСТ, 2019, ISBN 978-5-17-112269-0)
- Martin Isn't Crying, "Мартин не плачет" (fable with illustrations by author, М., 2021).
- The Double Bridges of Venisana, "Двойные мосты Венисаны" (М.: Livebook, 2021).
- The Secret Passages of Venisana, "Тайные ходы Венисаны" (М.: Livebook, 2021)
- Named After That One, "Имени такого-то" 15 (М.: Новое литературное обозрение, 2022 ISBN 978-5-4448-1733-9)
- The Black Fire of Venisana, "Черный огонь Венисаны" (М.: Livebook, 2022)
- Bobo Bobo (2023)
