= Japanese millet =

Japanese millet is a common name for several plants and may refer to:

- Echinochloa esculenta
- Echinochloa frumentacea
