= Siberian onion =

Siberian onion is a common name for several flowering plants and may refer to:

- Allium fistulosum
- Allium ochotense
- Allium sibiricum
