= RIR =

RIR may refer to:

- Regional Internet registry, nonprofit corporations that administer and register Internet Protocol (IP) address space and Autonomous Systems (AS)

== Companies and organizations ==
- Richmond International Raceway
- Riverside International Raceway
- Romsdalshalvøya Interkommunale Renovasjonsselskap, a Norwegian waste management agency
- British Army regiments:
  - Royal Irish Rangers
  - Royal Irish Rifles
  - Royal Irish Regiment, either:
    - Royal Irish Regiment (1684–1922)
    - Royal Irish Regiment (1992)

== Media and entertainment ==
- Real Illusions: Reflections, an album by American guitarist Steve Vai
- Rock in Rio, a recurring music festival, originating in Rio de Janeiro, Brazil
- Rush in Rio, a live album by Canadian band Rush

== Political parties ==
- React-Include-Recycle, a political party of Portugal

== Other uses ==
- Rhode Island Red, a breed of chicken
- Reps in reserve, a measure of training intensity
