= ROAR: Resistance and Opposition Arts Review =

- Editor-in-chief: Linor Goralik
- Managing Editor: Maria Voul
- Format: Online publication
- Publisher: Linor Goralik
- First issue: April 24, 2022
- Language: Russian
- Website: https://roar-review.com/

ROAR: Resistance and Opposition Arts Review (Russian: Вестник антивоенной и оппозиционной культуры, before the sixth issue — Russian Oppositional Arts Review, Russian: Вестник русской оппозиционной культуры) is a bimonthly online publication created by Linor Goralik, a notable Russian writer born in Ukraine and living in Israel, in 2022 after full-fledged Russian invasion in Ukraine. It publishes poetry, essays, prose, plays, as well as visual art and multimedia projects and music, which speaks out against "war and repression, violence and propaganda". According to Goralik, after the open call for the first issue, she received about 40 submissions a day. The inaugural issue, dedicated to the war in Ukraine, was published on April 24, 2022, with 130 different contributions.

Originally published in Russian, issues of ROAR are also being translated into several languages, including English, French, Italian, Japanese, and Polish.

In a recent conversation, someone dear to me called ROAR “a space for like-minded people.” I wanted to argue with that; I think it’s very important to remember that the authors for ROAR (and I am honored to know many of them personally) are very different people. I think their views of many problems, including politics, can be very different, if we look at them closely. But it is my deepest belief that they are of the one and the same opinion about one thing: the war being waged by the Russian government against Ukraine for more than a year now is unequivocally criminal. And I am incredibly grateful to each of our authors for the clarity, thoroughness, and sometimes bravery they express that opinion with.

— Linor Goralik, "Editor's Word", ROAR, Issue Seventh (April 24, 2023)

The first three issues of ROAR were each focused on a dedicated topic (namely, "Russian War Against Ukraine", "Resisting Violence" and "Everyday Resistance"), while later ones explore a wider range of themes dedicated to resistance and opposition. The publication was described by a French journalist who covered Russian affairs, likening it to Soviet-era Samizdat.

It works much a mailbox set up by an underground network during the Cold War. To make the reference clearer, the texts appear to be typed on a typewriter, like the legendary samizdats, writings smuggled among dissidents in the Soviet era. The difference is that the content is not secret plans, or even political novels, but rather unbridled rage. Since April, the Russian Oppositional Arts Review (ROAR) website has been home to all those intellectuals who cannot speak freely in Russia against the war in Ukraine. They can post an essay, a poem, music, or an illustration. Translated from Russian into English, these testimonies are now also available in French thanks to a team of volunteers.

— Isabelle Mandraud, Online magazine ROAR vents Russian dissidents' rage, Le Monde (June 25, 2022)

On July 15, 2022, ROAR was blocked in Russia by order of the Prosecutor General, as it allegedly published “false information of public importance,” including reports of “attacks on civilian infrastructures, numerous victims among Ukraine’s civilian population and the Russian Armed Forces, general mobilizations, and so on.”

Since the sixth issue, the magazine has been renamed omitting the word Russian because of the joining of the authors writing in Ukrainian. Still, it is treated as "a testament to the vibrancy of Russian oppositional culture".
