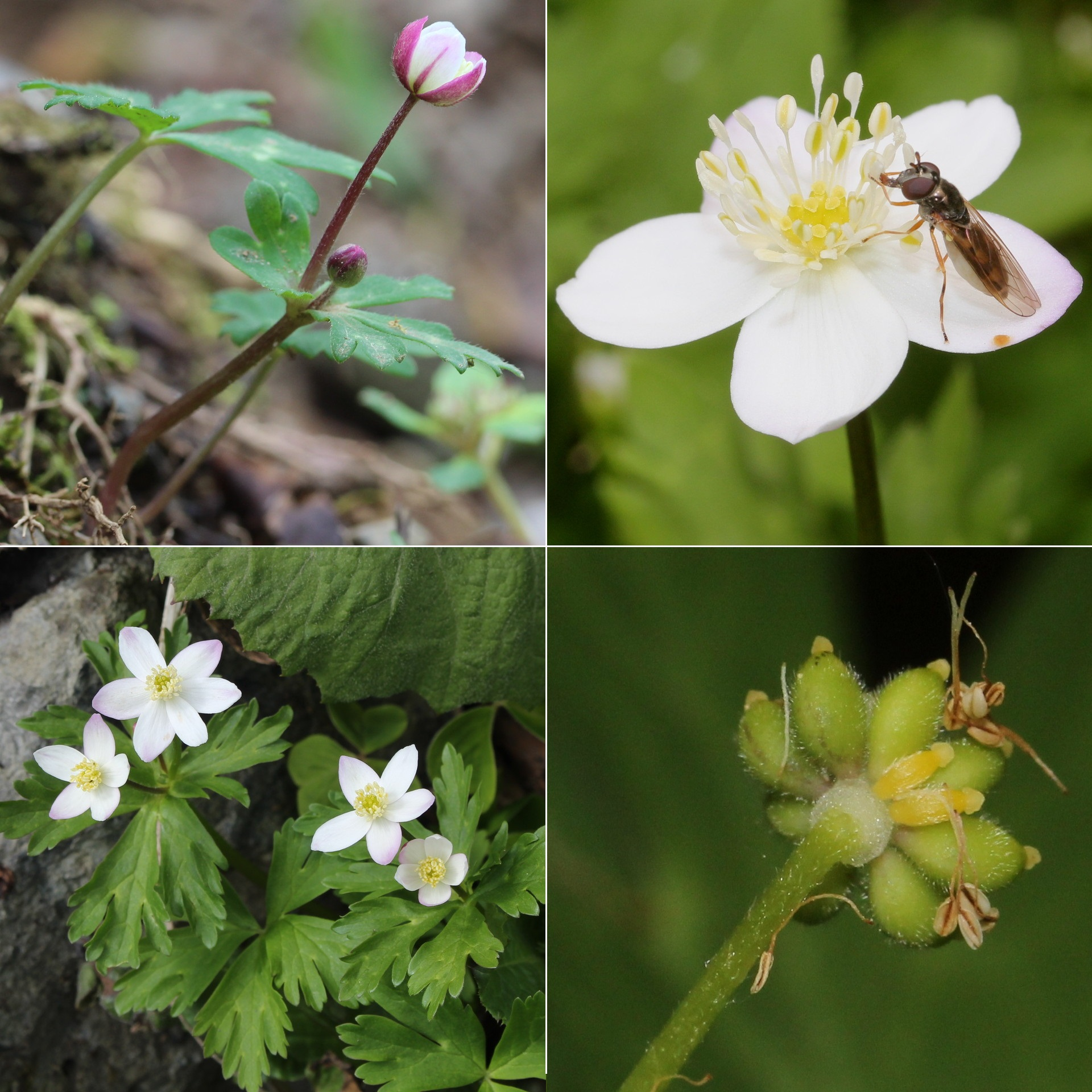

Scientific classification
- Kingdom: Plantae
- Clade: Tracheophytes
- Clade: Angiosperms
- Clade: Eudicots
- Order: Ranunculales
- Family: Ranunculaceae
- Genus: Anemonastrum
- Species: A. flaccidum

Binomial name
- Anemonastrum flaccidum (Fr.Schmidt) Mosyakin

Synonyms
- Anemone amagisanensis Honda; Anemone anhuiensis Y.K.Yang, N.Wang & W.C.Ye; Anemone flaccida Fr.Schmidt; Anemone flaccida var. anhuiensis (Y.K.Yang, N.Wang & W.C.Ye) Ziman & B.E.Dutton; Anemone flaccida var. hirtella W.T.Wang; Anemone flaccida var. tagawae (Ohwi) M.N.Tamura; Anemone laevigata (A.Gray) Koidz.; Anemone soyensis H.Boissieu; Anemone tagawae Ohwi; Anemonidium flaccidum (Fr.Schmidt) Christenh. & Byng; Anemonoides flaccida (Fr.Schmidt) Holub; Anemonoides soyensis (H.Boissieu) Holub; Arsenjevia flaccida (Fr.Schmidt) Starod.

= Anemonastrum flaccidum =

Species of flowering plant

Anemonastrum flaccidum, commonly known as the flaccid anemone or soft windflower, is a species of flowering plant in the family Ranunculaceae. It is a low-growing perennial native to East Asia.

== Description ==
Anemonastrum flaccidum grows to about 0.1 m (4 in) tall. It flowers from March to June, depending on the region. The flowers are approximately 2 cm in diameter and have white sepals that resemble petals.

Many stems bear two flower stalks, a characteristic that gives rise to the plant’s Japanese name, 二輪草 (nirinso, meaning "two-flowered plant"). The plant spreads by rhizomes and often forms dense colonies.

== Distribution ==
Anemonastrum flaccidum is native to the Amur River region, Sakhalin, central, eastern, and southern China, Korea, and Japan.

== Habitat ==
The species typically grows in moist, shaded environments such as forest floors, often near streams and ravines, in loose, peaty soils.

== Gallery ==
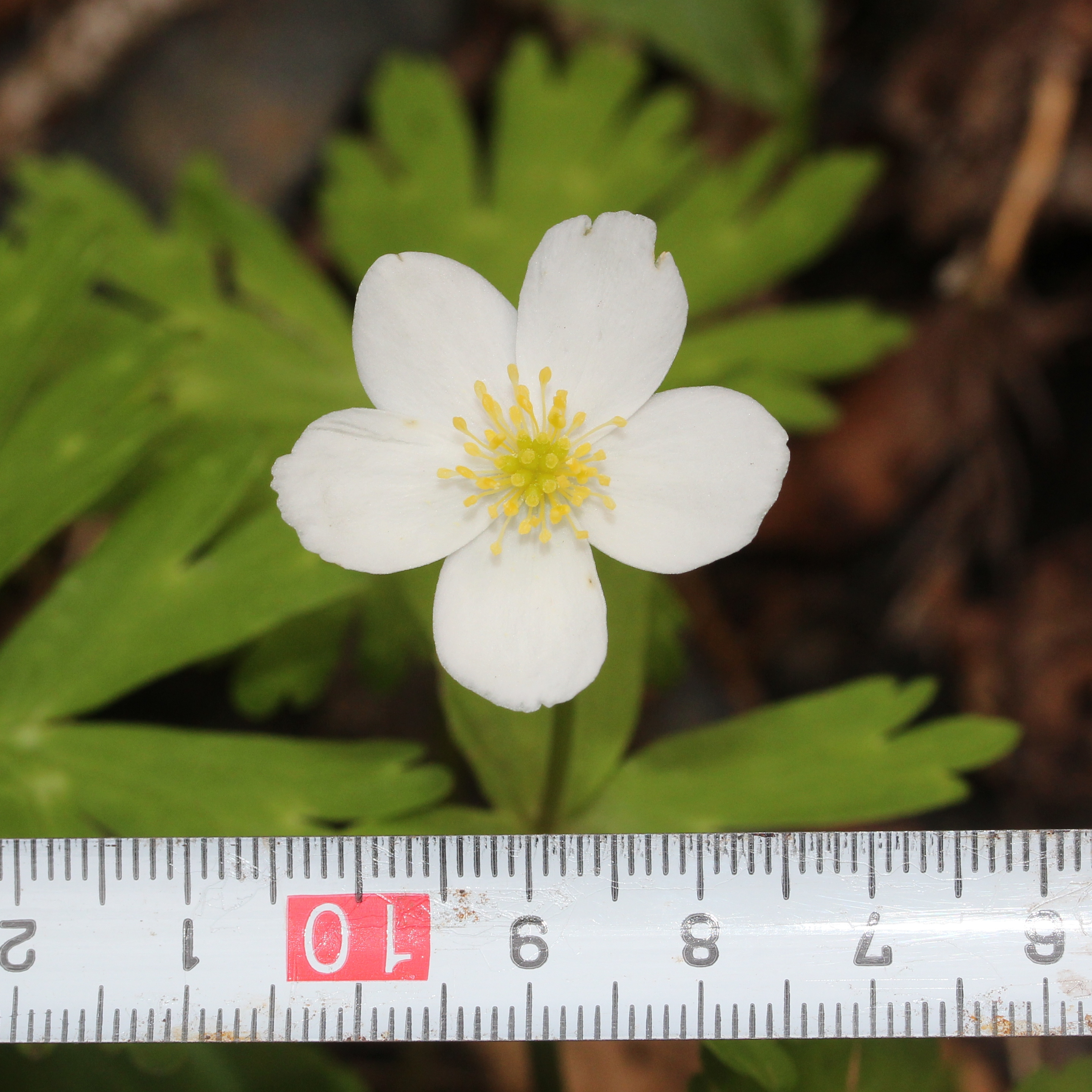
Flower (with scale)

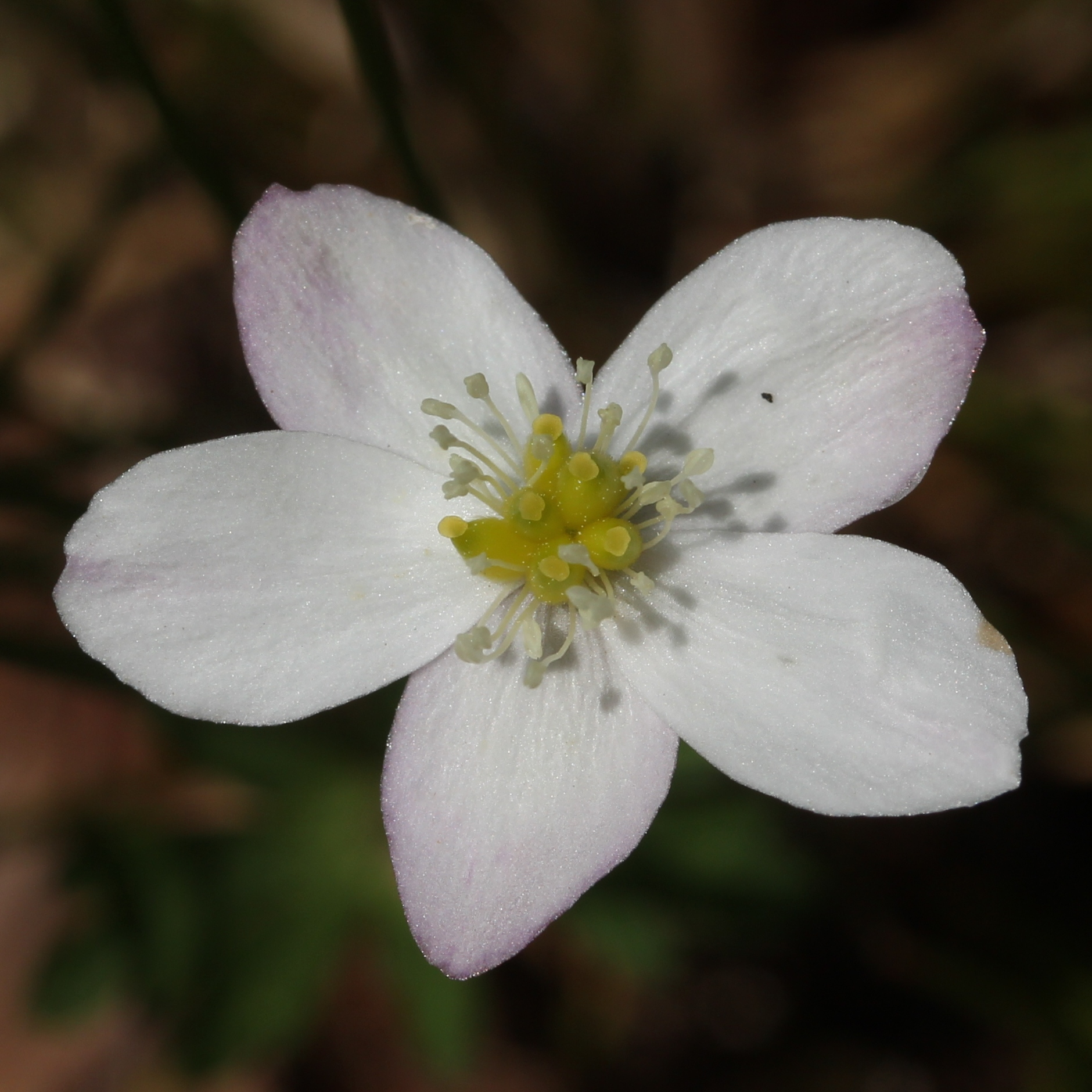
Flower close-up

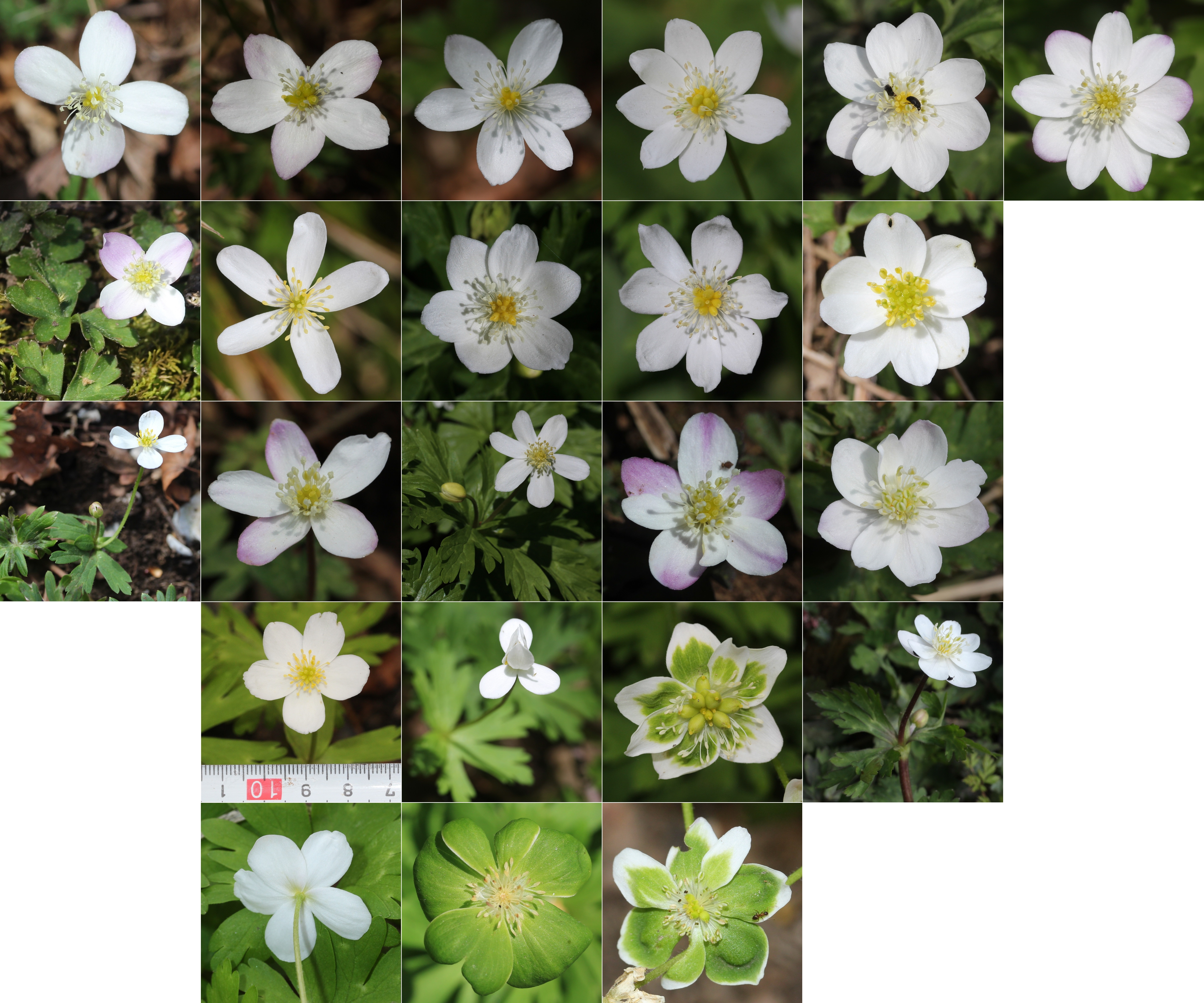
Montage of sepals

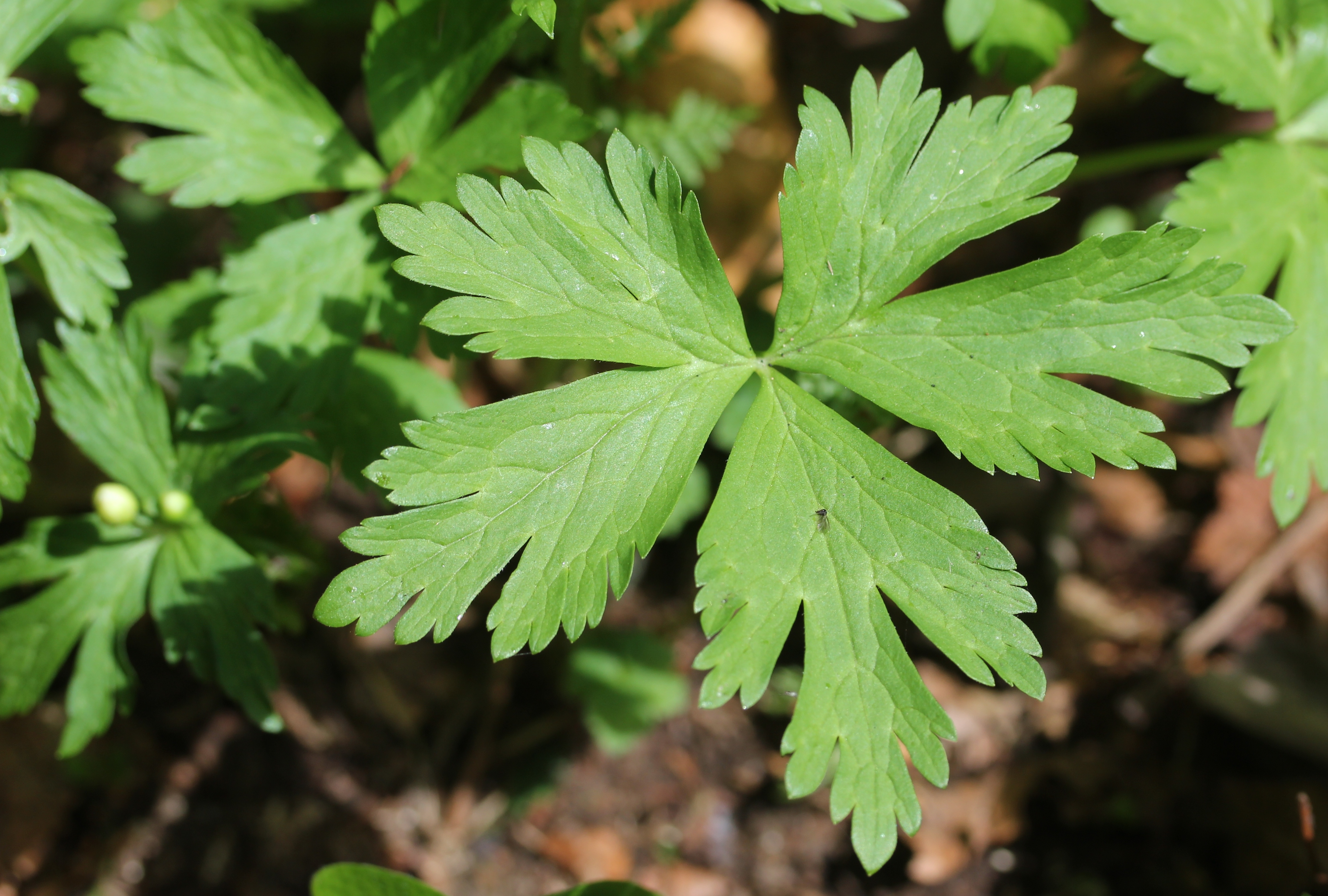
Leaf

In a park in Tokyo
