= Alcea heldreichii =

Scientific classification
- Kingdom: Plantae
- Clade: Tracheophytes
- Clade: Angiosperms
- Clade: Eudicots
- Clade: Rosids
- Order: Malvales
- Family: Malvaceae
- Genus: Alcea
- Species: A. heldreichii

Binomial name
- Alcea heldreichii (Boiss.) Boiss.

Synonyms
- Synonym list: Althaea heldreichii Boiss.; Althaea bordzilowskii Wissjul.

Species of flowering plant

Alcea heldreichii is a hollyhock plant native to southeastern Europe and Turkey.

== Description ==
Alcea heldreichii can reach 0.8 metres (2.6 ft) in height. It has narrow stems (10 millimetres (0.39 in)), with dense star-like (stellate) hairs. It is distinctive for its small leaves (6 centimetres (2.4 in)) which are shallowly or not deeply lobed. Its flowers are pink or white (white in Turkey) on short (2–5 millimetres (0.079–0.197 in)) stalks. Inflorescence is often dense toward the end. Alcea heldreichii may be found at roadsides, rocky slopes, steppe, and open areas of forest.

The epicalyx is small (<50% calyx), and its fruit segments are winged, shallowly furrowed, and stellate-pilose hairy on dorsal and lateral sides.

It can be distinguished from A. biennis by its narrower stems, short flower stalks, short epicalyx, and generally smaller less rugged-topped leaves.

== Distribution ==
Alcea heldreichii can be found in Bulgaria, Greece, Turkey, Ukraine, Yugoslavia.
