= Alcea apterocarpa =

Scientific classification
- Kingdom: Plantae
- Clade: Tracheophytes
- Clade: Angiosperms
- Clade: Eudicots
- Clade: Rosids
- Order: Malvales
- Family: Malvaceae
- Genus: Alcea
- Species: A. apterocarpa

Binomial name
- Alcea apterocarpa (Fenzl) Boiss.

Synonyms
- Synonym list: Althaea apterocarpa Fenzl; Alcea apterocarpa var. lilacina Boiss.; Alcea lilacina Boiss. & Kotschy; Althaea apterocarpa var. lilacina (Boiss.) Baker f.

Species of flowering plant

Alcea apterocarpa is a tall hollyhock plant native to Lebanon, Syria, Palestine, the Sinai, and Turkey.

== Description ==
Alcea apterocarpa is a tall (up to 2 m (6.6 ft)) hollyhock with 15 mm (0.59 in) thick stems. It is distinctive for its woolly stems, many-lobed stem leaves (5–9 lobes) and large flowers. The flowers have pink, violet or white petals. It is typically found at roadsides, fields, rocky slopes, calcareous ground, and steppes.

It has a long epicalyx, its fruit segments are wingless and rugose. Its stellate-pilose are hairy.

It is similar in appearance to Alcea biennis, but A. biennis has winged fruit segments whereas Alcea apterocarpa does not.
