= Alcea ficifolia =

Scientific classification
- Kingdom: Plantae
- Clade: Tracheophytes
- Clade: Angiosperms
- Clade: Eudicots
- Clade: Rosids
- Order: Malvales
- Family: Malvaceae
- Genus: Alcea
- Species: A. ficifolia

Binomial name
- Alcea ficifolia L.

Synonyms
- Alcea rosea subsp. ficifolia (L.) Govaerts; Althaea ficifolia (L.) Cav.; Alcea ficifolia var. violacea Boiss.; Alcea lenkoranica var. palmatifida Zohary; Alcea rosea var. sibthorpii Boiss.; Althaea ficifolia var. violacea (Boiss.) Baker f.; Althaea rosea var. sibthorpii (Boiss.) Baker f.

Species of flowering plant

Alcea ficifolia, commonly known as the fig leaf hollyhock, fig hollyhock and Antwerp hollyhock, is a perennial herbaceous plant in the mallow family (Malvaceae). This species is native to Iran and introduced into Europe, and it is well-known for its beautiful, tall flower spikes.

== Properties ==
It can grow up to 1.5–2.5 m (4 ft 11 in – 8 ft 2 in) tall, leaves are large, fig-shaped, with deep lobes and a rough texture, flowers are typically yellow, though they can also be found in shades of pink, red, and white, each flower has five petals and a prominent central column of stamens
