= Alcea tabrisiana =

Scientific classification
- Kingdom: Plantae
- Clade: Embryophytes
- Clade: Tracheophytes
- Clade: Angiosperms
- Clade: Eudicots
- Clade: Rosids
- Order: Malvales
- Family: Malvaceae
- Genus: Alcea
- Species: A. tabrisiana

Binomial name
- Alcea tabrisiana (Boiss. & Buhse) Iljin

Synonyms
- Alcea flavovirens var. microcarpa Zohary; Alcea glabrata Alef.; Alcea glabrata var. microcarpa (Zohary) Pakravan; Alcea grossheimii Iljin; Althaea tabrisiana Boiss. & Buhse

Species of flowering plant

Alcea tabrisiana is a species of flowering plant in the hollyhock genus Alcea, family Malvaceae. It is native to Turkey, the Transcaucasus, and Iran. It occurs on dry stony slopes, in mountain steppe and in forests, between 750 and 1,750 m (2,460 and 5,740 ft) elevation.
