= Alcea remotiflora =

Scientific classification
- Kingdom: Plantae
- Clade: Embryophytes
- Clade: Tracheophytes
- Clade: Angiosperms
- Clade: Eudicots
- Clade: Rosids
- Order: Malvales
- Family: Malvaceae
- Genus: Alcea
- Species: A. remotiflora

Binomial name
- Alcea remotiflora (Boiss. & Heldr.) Alef.

Synonyms
- Synonym list: Althaea remotiflora Boiss. & Heldr.

Species of flowering plant in the mallow family

Alcea remotiflora is a species of flowering plant in the family Malvaceae. It is native from Turkey to Iran.

== Description ==
A medium-sized (to 0.8 m) hollyhock with narrow stem (to 10 mm), notable for its 5–7-lobed stem leaves having end lobes very long, rather finger-like with rounded tip, compared to the shorter side lobes (base leaves however are shallow-lobed), the pink or white flowers not large (petals to 30 mm), pale at centre, in groups of 1–2 at leaf stalks. All parts densely velvety hairy with adpressed star-like hairs. Found in rocky places, in Turkey to 1,800 m (5,900 ft).

Epicalyx with many parts, small (<50% calyx), fruit segments wingless, shallowly furrowed, conspicuously rugose, pilose on lateral side.

== Distribution ==
Iran, Lebanon-Syria, Turkey.
