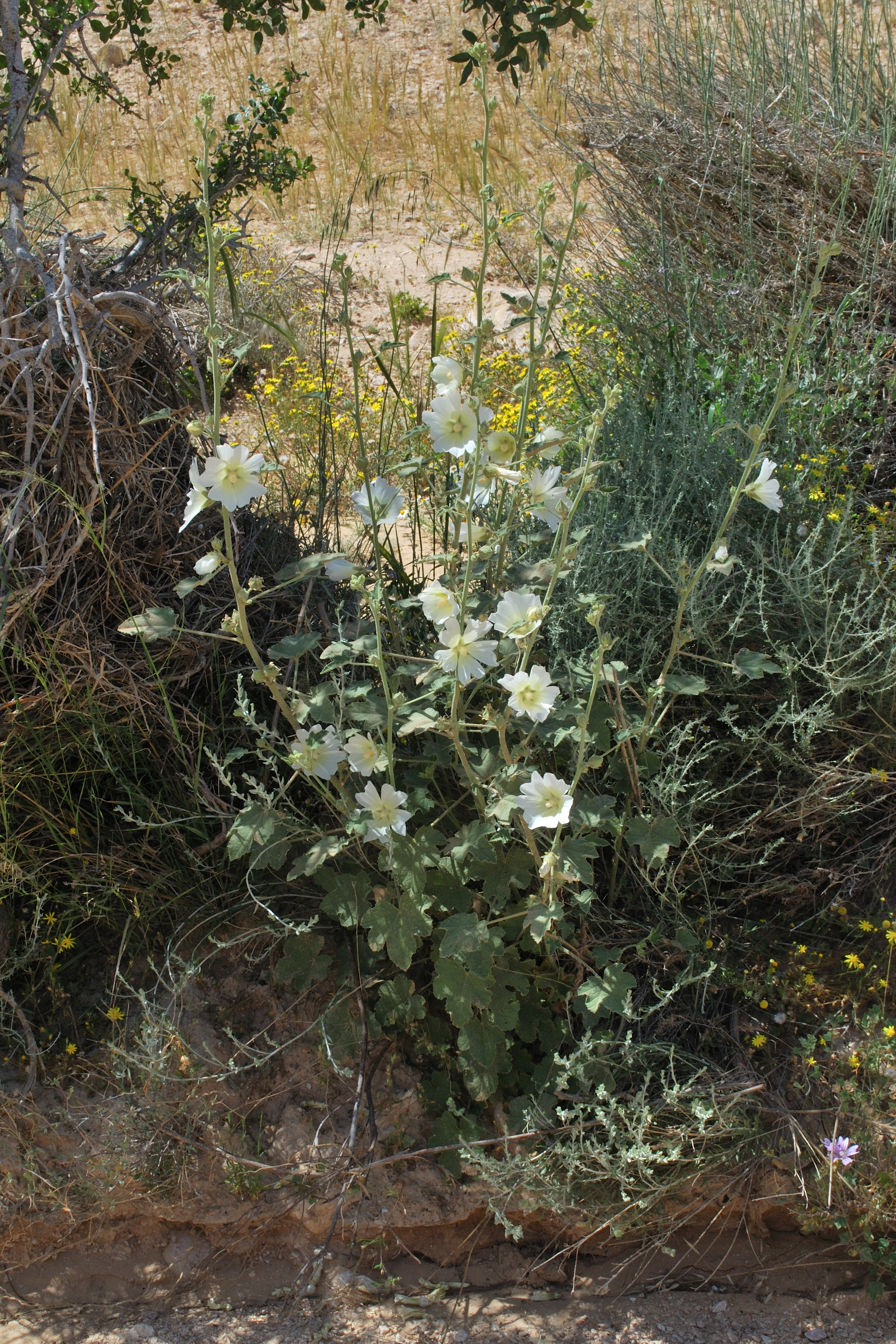

Scientific classification
- Kingdom: Plantae
- Clade: Tracheophytes
- Clade: Angiosperms
- Clade: Eudicots
- Clade: Rosids
- Order: Malvales
- Family: Malvaceae
- Genus: Alcea
- Species: A. striata

Binomial name
- Alcea striata (DC.) Alef.

Synonyms
- Synonym list: Althaea striata DC.; Alcea haussknechtii Boiss.; Alcea striata var. assyriaca Boiss.; Althaea haussknechtii (Boiss.) Baker f.; Althaea striata var. assyriaca (Boiss.) Baker f.

= Alcea striata =

Species of flowering plant

Alcea striata, the desert hollyhock, is a tall hollyhock plant native between Turkey and Saudi Arabia. It is found in rocky limestone slopes, fields, roadsides, scrub, and deserts, in the elevations 0–1200 m (0–4000 ft). It can be found in Lebanon, Syria, Palestine, Saudi Arabia, Sinai, and Turkey.
