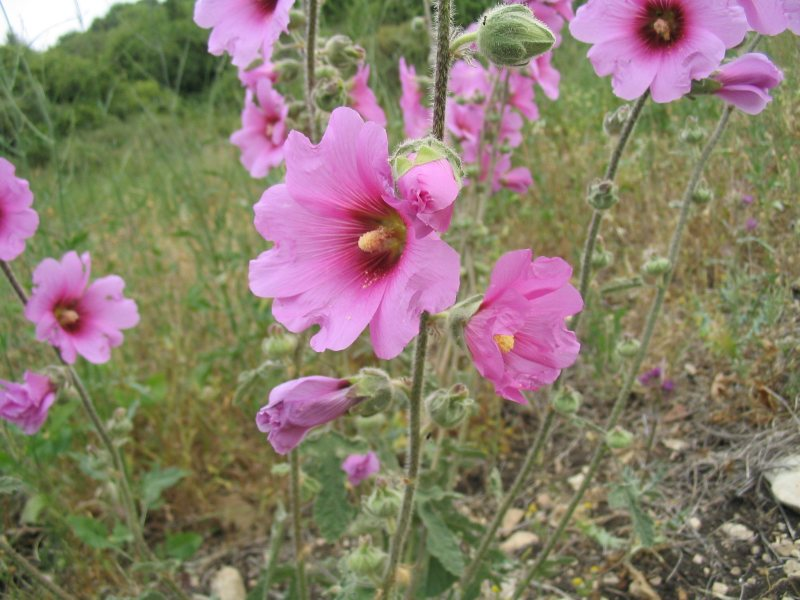
- Alcea setosa

Scientific classification
- Kingdom: Plantae
- Clade: Tracheophytes
- Clade: Angiosperms
- Clade: Eudicots
- Clade: Rosids
- Order: Malvales
- Family: Malvaceae
- Subfamily: Malvoideae
- Tribe: Malveae
- Genus: Alcea; L.

Species
- See text

= Alcea =

Genus of flowering plants in the mallow family

Alcea is a genus of over 80 species of flowering plants in the mallow family Malvaceae, commonly known as the hollyhocks. They are native to Asia and Europe. The single species of hollyhock from the Americas, the streambank wild hollyhock, belongs to a different genus.

== Description ==
Hollyhocks are annual, biennial, or perennial plants usually taking an erect, unbranched form. The herbage usually has a coating of star-shaped hairs. The leaf blades are often lobed or toothed, and are borne on long petioles. The flowers may be solitary or arranged in fascicles or racemes. The notched petals are usually over three centimeters wide and may be pink, white, purple, or yellow. The fruit is a schizocarp, a dry disc divided into over 15 sections that contain seeds.

== Species ==
The following species are accepted:

- Alcea abchazica Iljin
- Alcea acaulis (Cav.) Alef.
- Alcea afghanica I.Riedl
- Alcea antoninae Iljin
- Alcea apterocarpa (Fenzl) Boiss.
- Alcea arbelensis Boiss. & Hausskn.
- Alcea assadii Pakravan
- Alcea aucheri (Boiss.) Alef.
- Alcea baldshuanica (Bornm.) Iljin
- Alcea biennis Winterl
- Alcea calvertii (Boiss.) Boiss.
- Alcea chrysantha (Sam.) Zohary
- Alcea damascena (Mouterde) Mouterde
- Alcea denudata Boiss.
- Alcea digitata (Boiss.) Alef.
- Alcea dissecta (Baker f.) Zohary
- Alcea djahromi Parsa
- Alcea excubita Iljin
- Alcea fasciculiflora Zohary
- Alcea ficifolia L. – Antwerp hollyhock
- Alcea flavovirens (Boiss. & Buhse) Iljin
- Alcea freyniana Iljin
- Alcea froloviana (Litv.) Iljin
- Alcea galilaea Zohary
- Alcea ghahremanii Pakravan & Assadi
- Alcea gorganica (Rech.f., Aellen & Esfand.) Zohary
- Alcea heldreichii (Boiss.) Boiss.
- Alcea hohenackeri Boiss.
- Alcea hyrcana Grossh.
- Alcea ilamica Pakravan
- Alcea iranshahrii Pakravan, Ghahr. & Assadi
- Alcea karakalensis Freyn
- Alcea karsiana (Bordz.) Litv.
- Alcea koelzii I.Riedl
- Alcea kopetdaghensis Iljin
- Alcea kuhsanguia Parsa
- Alcea kurdica (Schltdl.) Alef.
- Alcea kusjariensis (Iljin ex Grossh.) Iljin
- Alcea lasiocalycina Boiss.
- Alcea lavateriflora (DC.) Boiss.
- Alcea lenkoranica Iljin
- Alcea litvinovii (Iljin) Iljin
- Alcea loftusii (Baker f.) Zohary
- Alcea longipedicellata I.Riedl
- Alcea mazandaranica Pakravan & Ghahr.
- Alcea mosulensis I.Riedl
- Alcea mozaffarianii Ghahr. & Pakravan & Assadi
- Alcea nikitinii Iljin
- Alcea nudiflora (Lindl.) Boiss.
- Alcea peduncularis Boiss. & Hausskn.
- Alcea pisidica Hub.-Mor.
- Alcea popovii Iljin
- Alcea rechingeri (Zohary) I.Riedl
- Alcea remotiflora (Boiss. & Heldr.) Alef.
- Alcea rhyticarpa (Trautv.) Iljin
- Alcea rosea L. – common hollyhock
- Alcea rosulata I.Riedl
- Alcea rufescens (Boiss.) Boiss.
- Alcea rugosa Alef.
- Alcea scabridula I.Riedl
- Alcea schirazana Alef.
- Alcea semnanica Pakravan
- Alcea setosa (Boiss.) Alef. – bristly hollyhock
- Alcea sophiae Iljin
- Alcea sosnovskyi Iljin
- Alcea sotudehi Parsa
- Alcea striata (DC.) Alef.
- Alcea sulphurea (Boiss. & Hohen.) Alef.
- Alcea sycophylla Iljin & V.V.Nikitin
- Alcea tabrisiana (Boiss. & Buhse) Iljin
- Alcea talassica Iljin
- Alcea tarica Pakravan & Ghahr.
- Alcea teheranica Parsa
- Alcea tholozanii Stapf
- Alcea transcaucasica (Iljin) Iljin
- Alcea turcomanica Iljin
- Alcea turkeviczii Iljin
- Alcea vameghii Parsa
- Alcea wilhelminae I.Riedl
- Alcea woronowii (Iljin ex Grossh.) Iljin
- Alcea xanthochlora I.Riedl

== Uses ==
Hollyhocks are popular garden ornamental plants. They are easily grown from seed. Plants with red flowers attract hummingbirds and butterflies. Cultivars have been bred, especially from A. rosea. They include the double-flowered 'Chater's Double', the raspberry-colored 'Creme de Cassis', and 'The Watchman', which has dark, nearly black, maroon flowers.

The stems of hollyhocks can be used as firewood, and the roots have been used medicinally.

== Pests and diseases ==
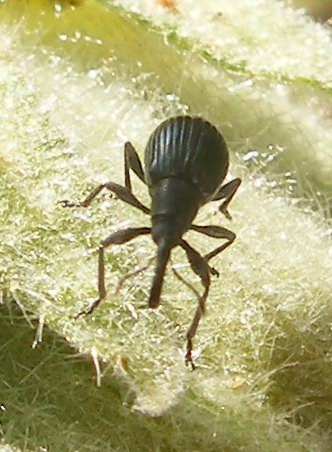
Hollyhock weevil (Rhopalapion longirostre)

Alcea species are used as food plants by the larvae of some Lepidoptera species including Bucculatrix quadrigemina and Vanessa cardui, the painted lady.

The mallow flea beetle (Podagrica fuscicornis) is a pest that makes tiny holes in the leaves. Cutworms, aphids, and capsid bugs use the plant as a food source in hotter and drier conditions. A number of weevils use A. rosea as their host plant, including Rhopalapion longirostre, Alocentron curvirostre, and Aspidapion validum.

The plants are also susceptible to the pathogenic fungus Puccinia malvacearum, the hollyhock rust.

== Culture ==
The Aoi Matsuri (Hollyhock Festival) is one of the three main festivals of the city of Kyoto. During the Victorian era, the hollyhock symbolized both ambition and fecundity in the language of flowers.

The UK National Collection of hollyhocks is held by Jonathan Sheppard in Lincolnshire.

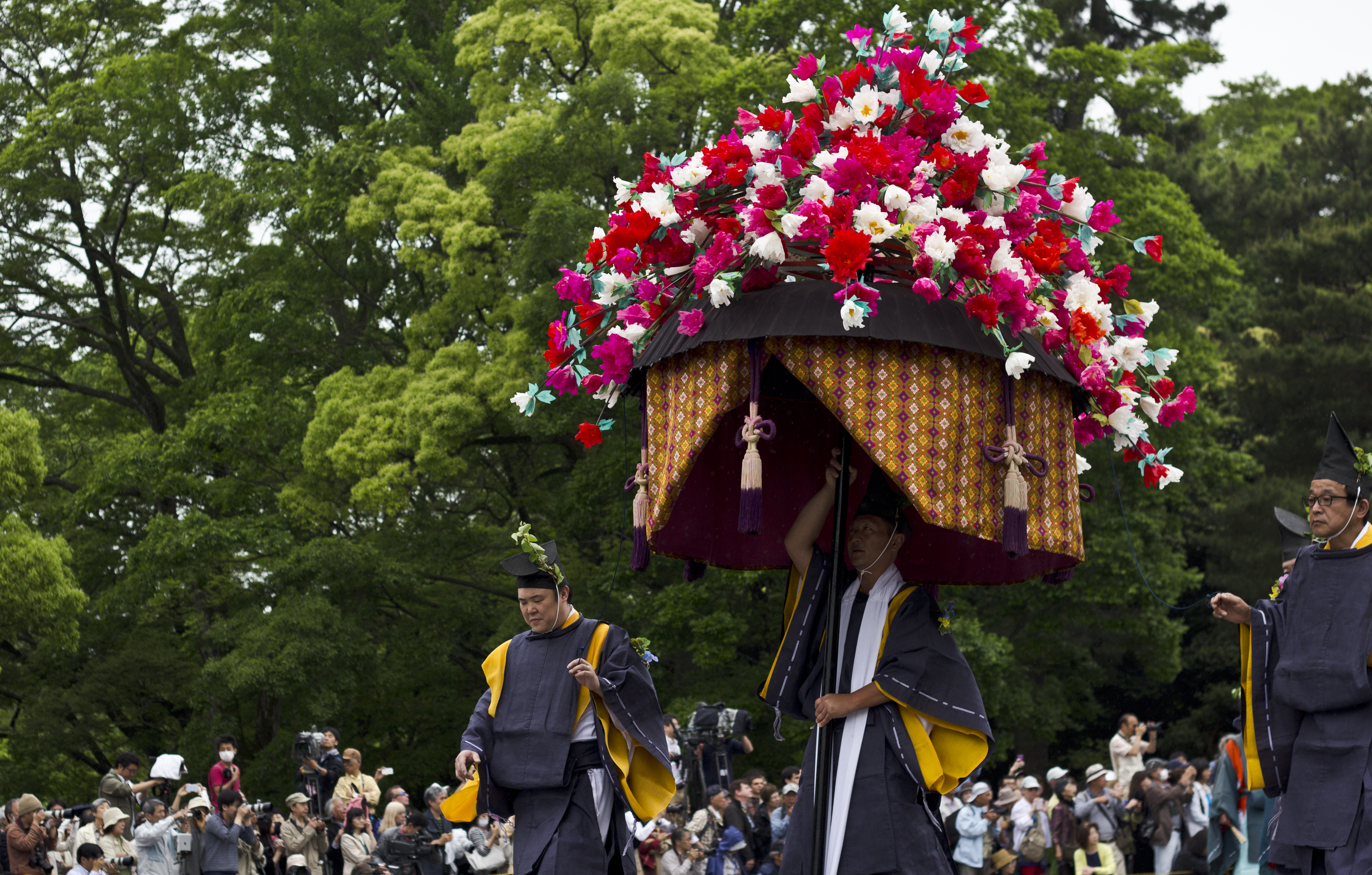
Man carrying a hollyhock float during the Aoi Matsuri procession

== Gallery ==
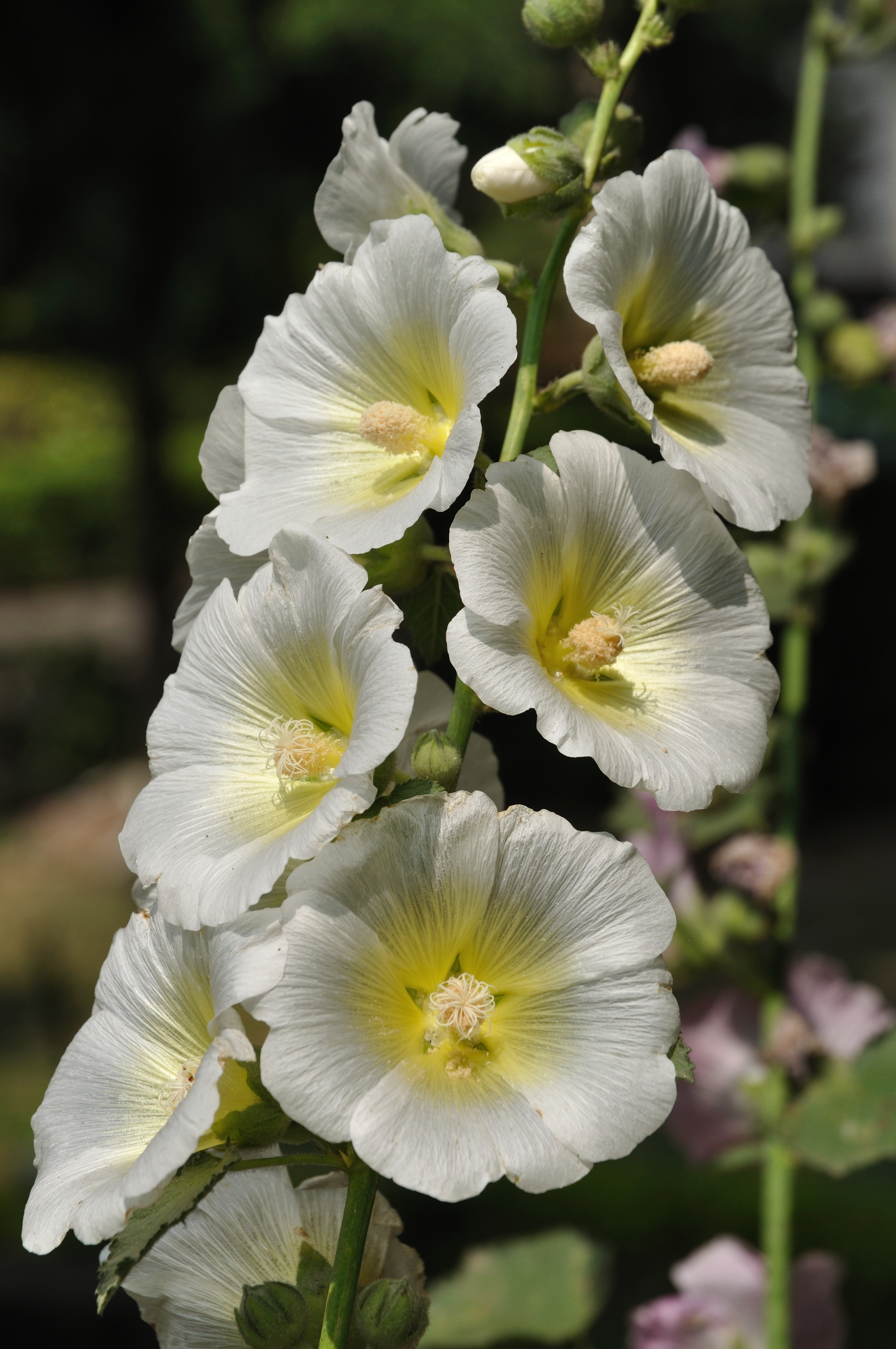
Alcea sp.

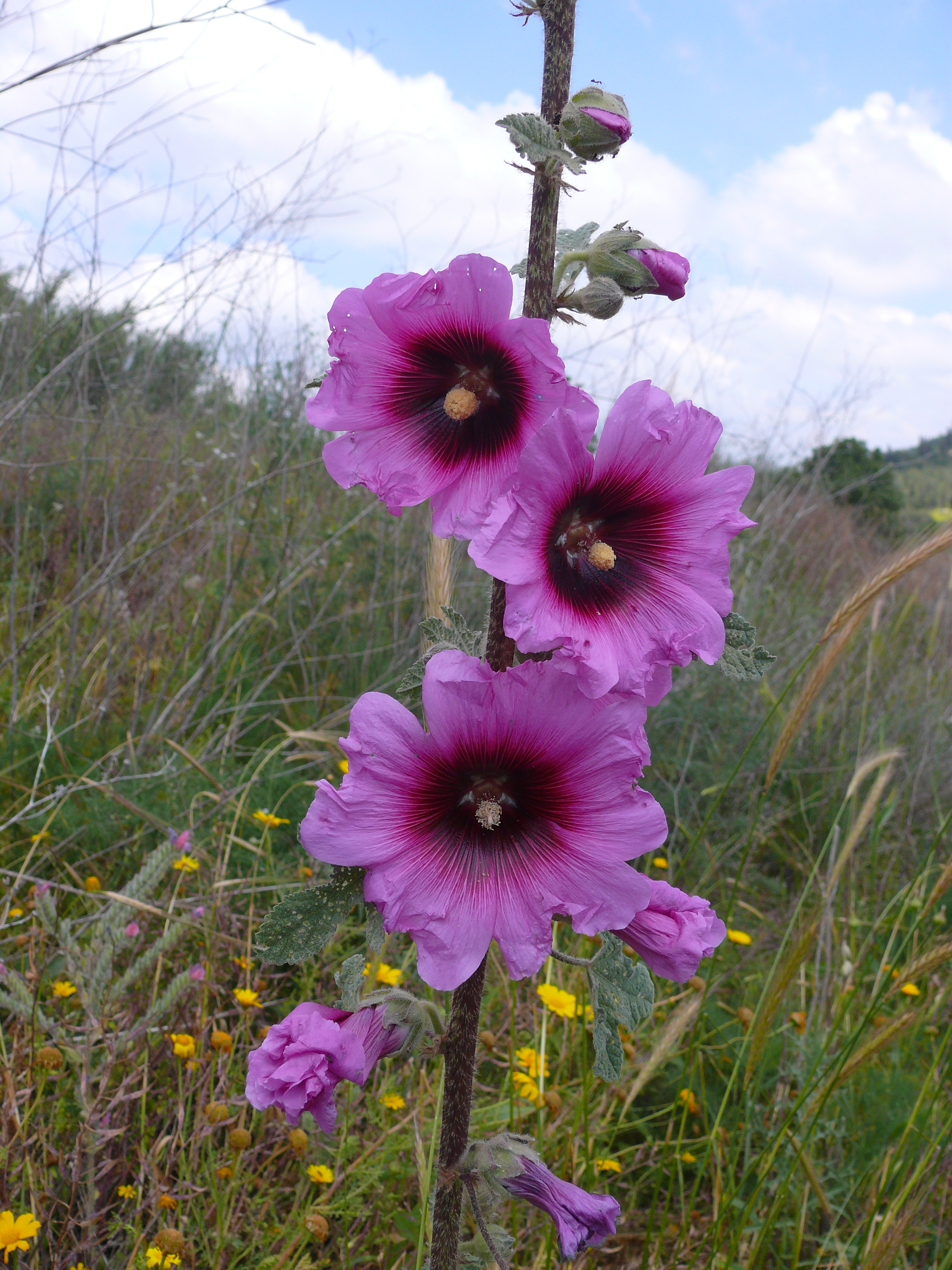
Alcea setosa

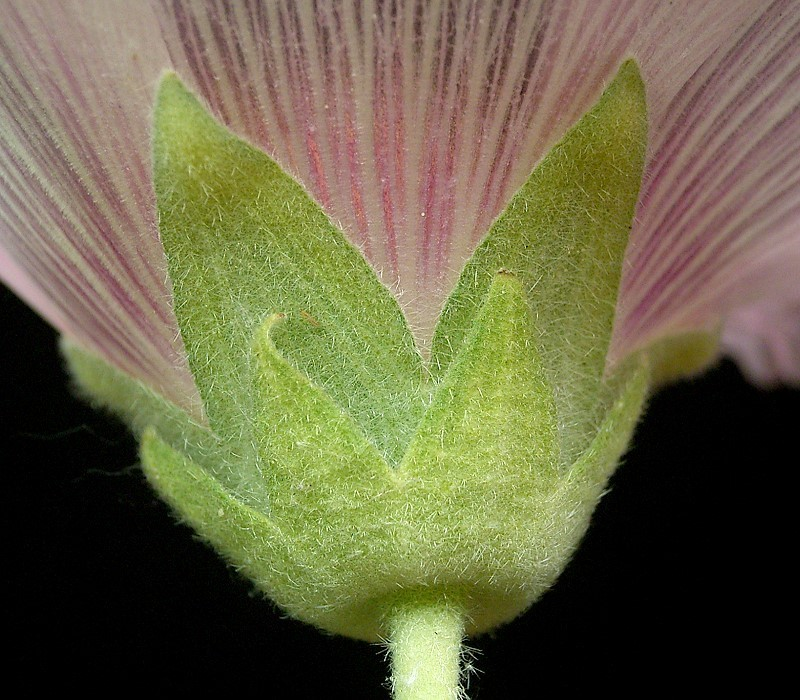
Sepals

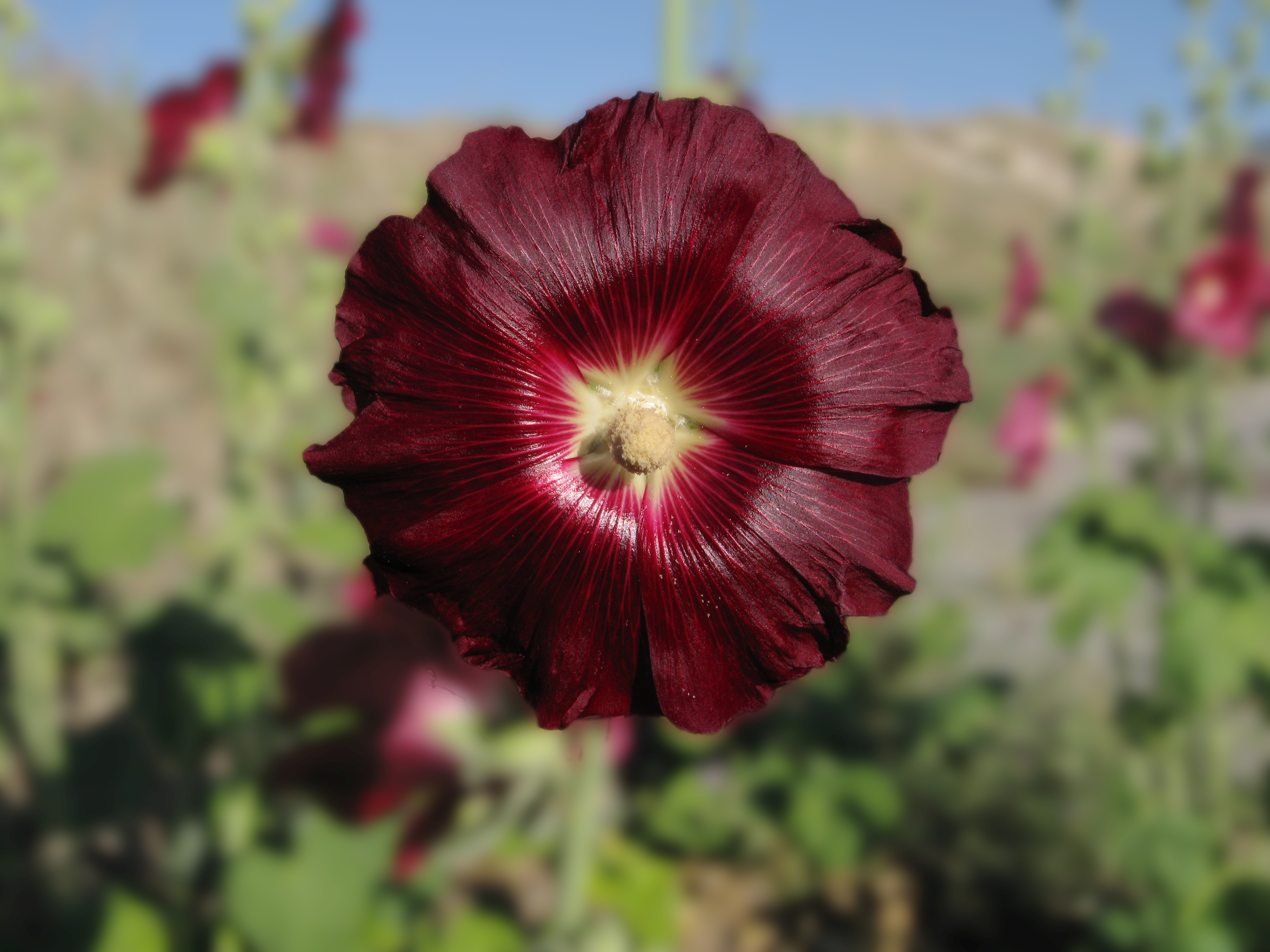
Alcea rosea 'Nigra'

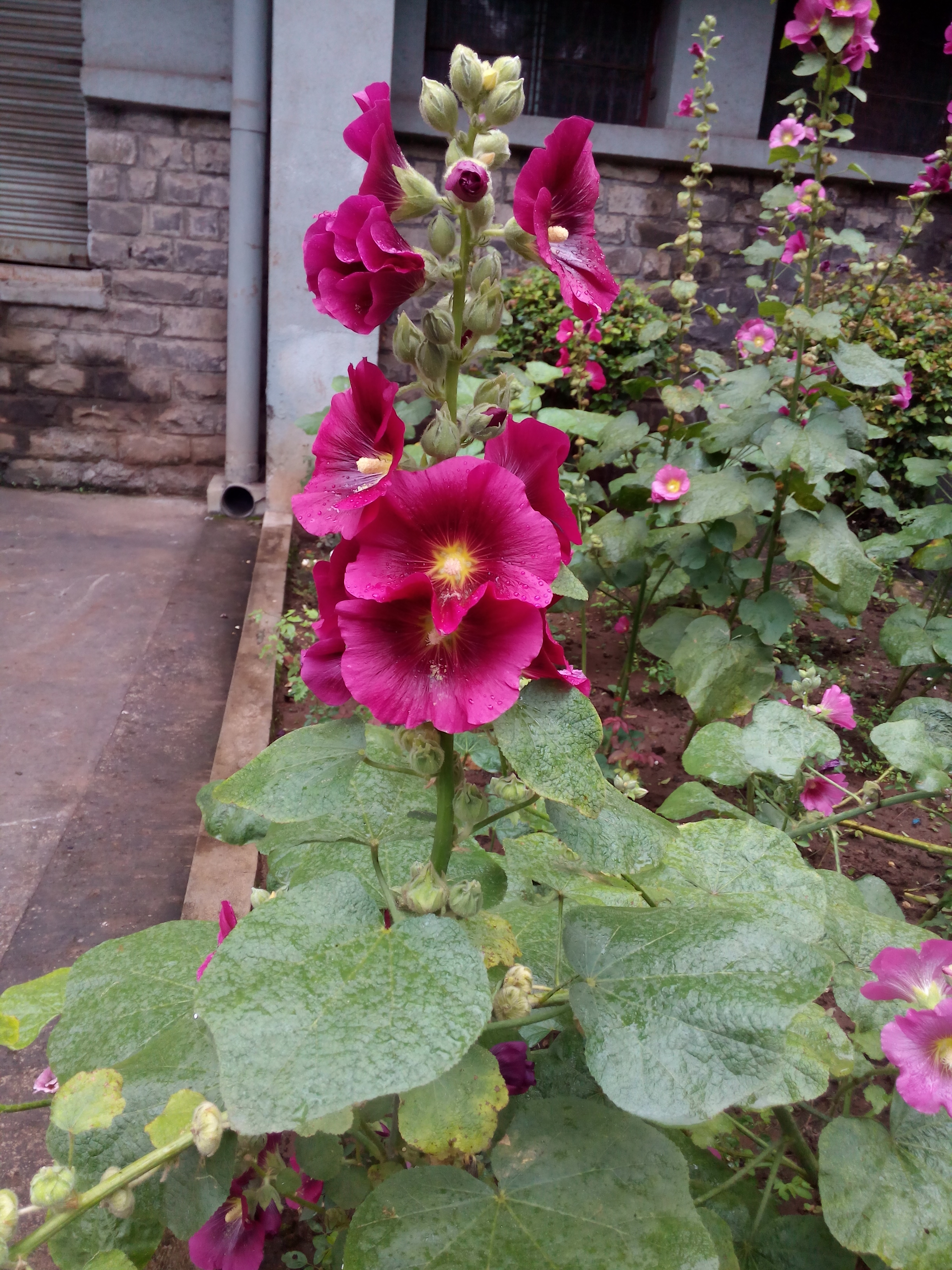
Alcea sp.

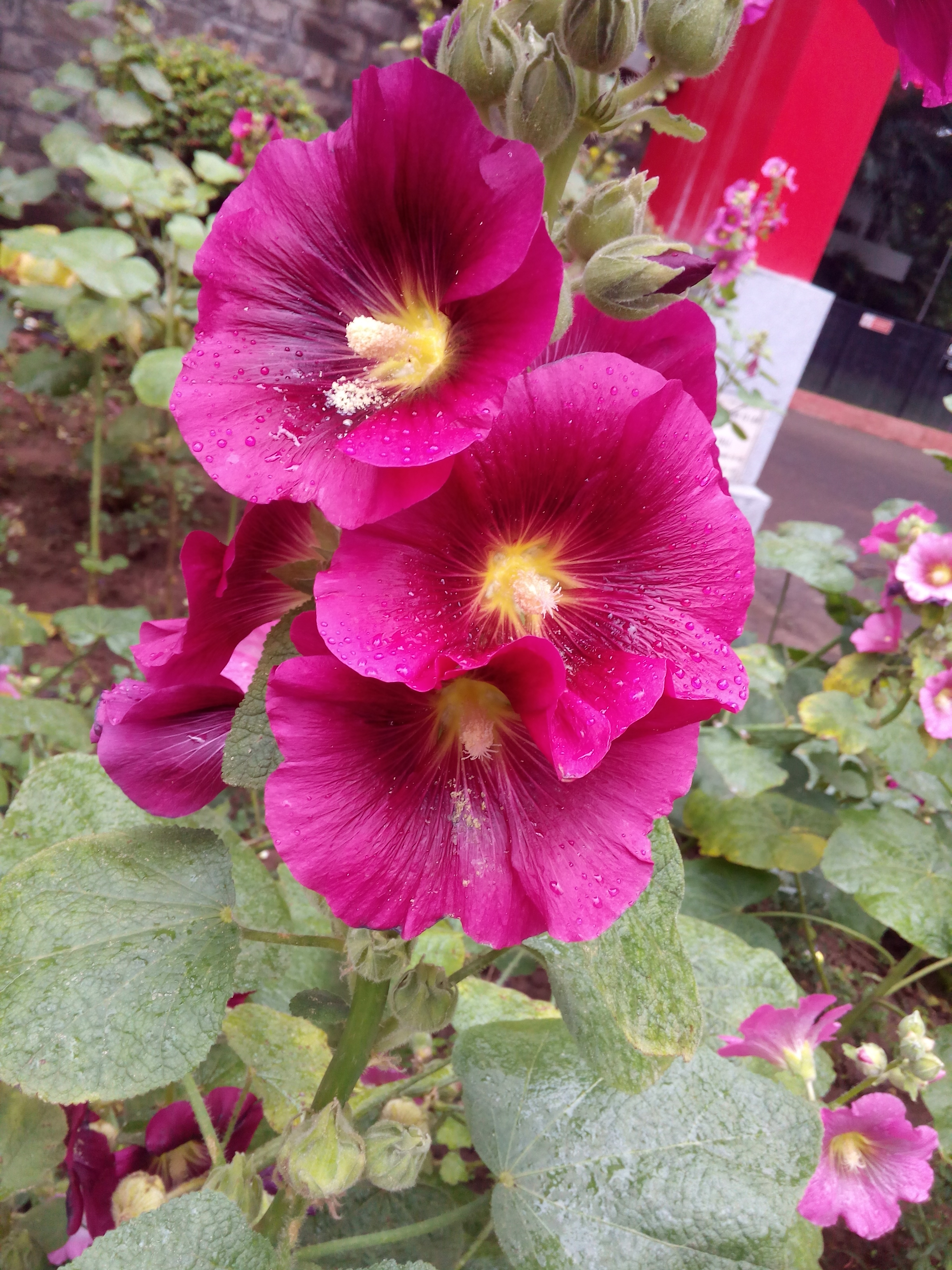
Alcea sp. Closer look at the flower
