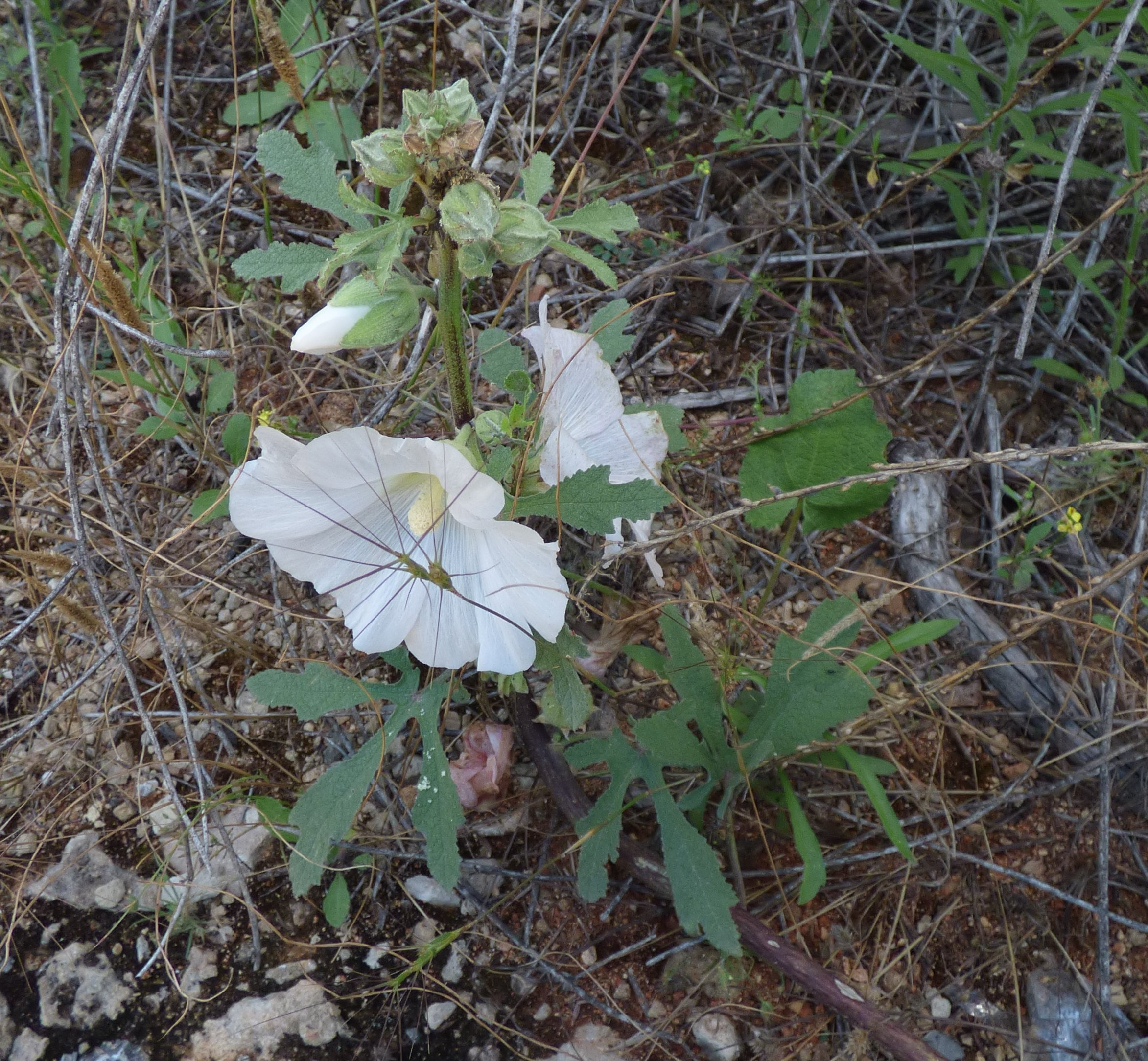
- Small plant flowering in Antalya

Scientific classification
- Kingdom: Plantae
- Clade: Tracheophytes
- Clade: Angiosperms
- Clade: Eudicots
- Clade: Rosids
- Order: Malvales
- Family: Malvaceae
- Genus: Alcea
- Species: A. digitata

Binomial name
- Alcea digitata (Boiss.) Alef.

Synonyms
- Synonym list: Althaea digitata Boiss.; Alcea leiocarpa (Sam.); Althaea leiocarpa Sam.

= Alcea digitata =

Species of flowering plant

Alcea digitata, the fingered hollyhock, is a tall hollyhock with large flowers native to the Middle East.

== Description ==
A medium to tall (up to 3 m), hairy hollyhock with large, pinkish, or pale flowers (petals to 50 mm). The leaves (particularly upper ones) are distinctively divided into spreading finger-like lobes whose edges are irregular and at times sublobed, the lobes at the base of the leaf tending to point rather backward. Whilst the leaf-end lobe is larger than the others but not hugely so. The low leaves can be well-divided into fingers or just shallowly lobed.

The stem is narrow (to 12 mm) and branched only at the base.The hairs are star-like (sparse or dense). When tall, its height mostly comprises a long flower stalk with little leafage. It is found at roadsides, fields, rocky slopes, steppe, and maquis.

The epicalyx is large (>=50% calyx). The fruit segments with wingless edges, conspicuously wrinkled, pilose hairy (the sides sparsely).

== Distribution ==
The plant's range includes Iran, Lebanon, Palestine, Syria, and Turkey. In Turkey, it has been found growing at an elevation range of 20–2400 metres.

== Botanical photographs ==
Photographs from Antalya unless indicated.

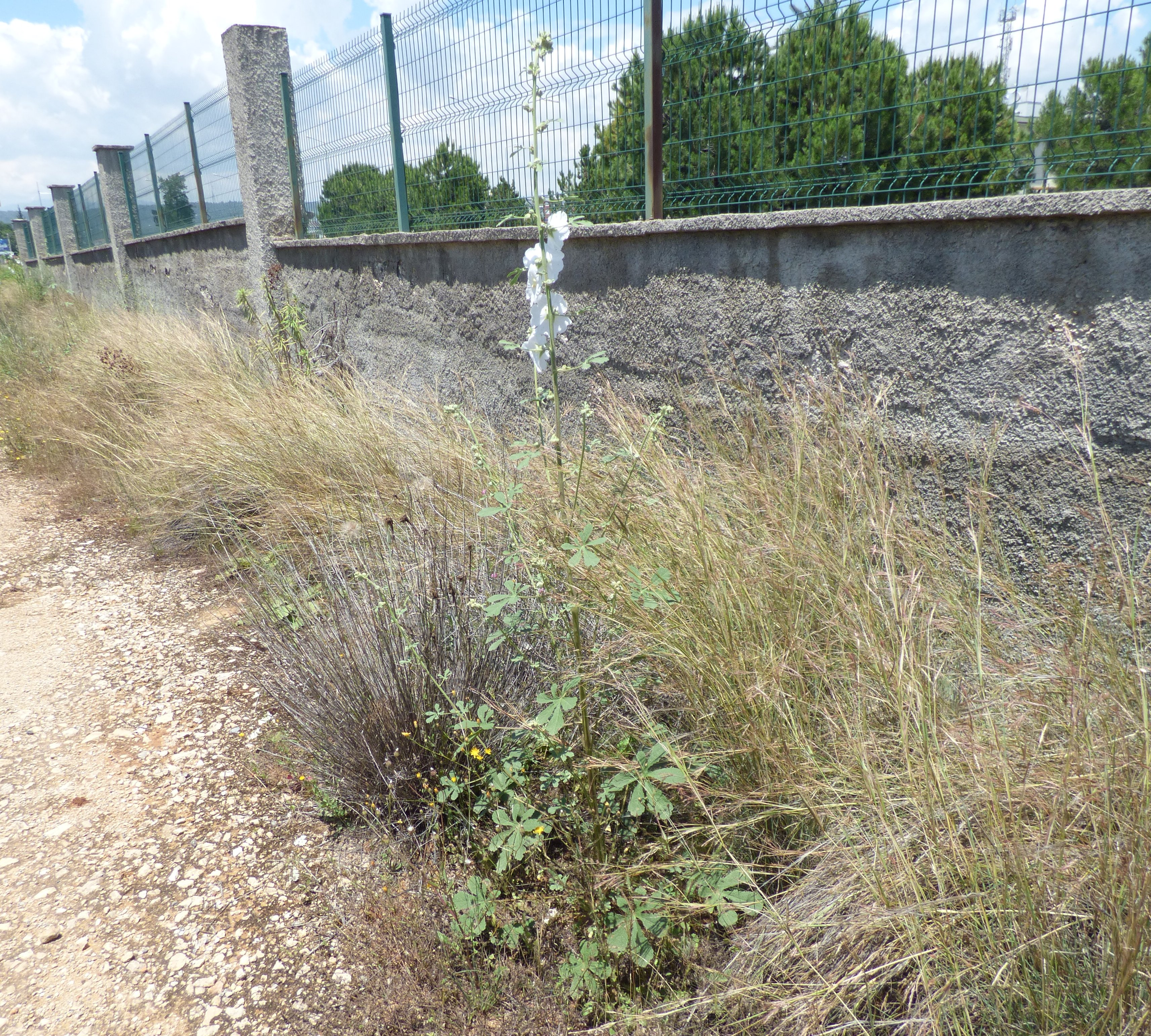
Typical look in flower

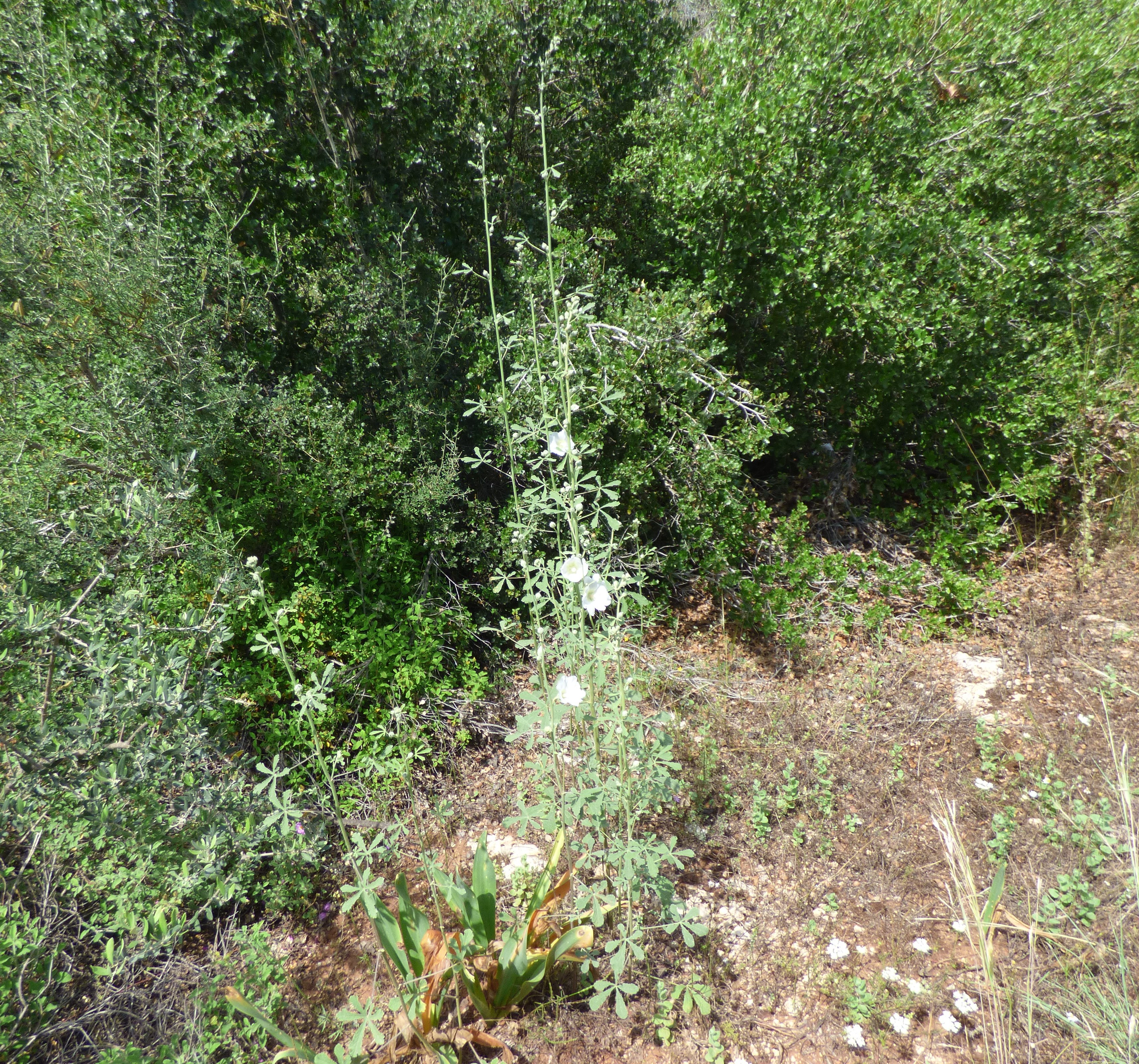
Typical look in flower

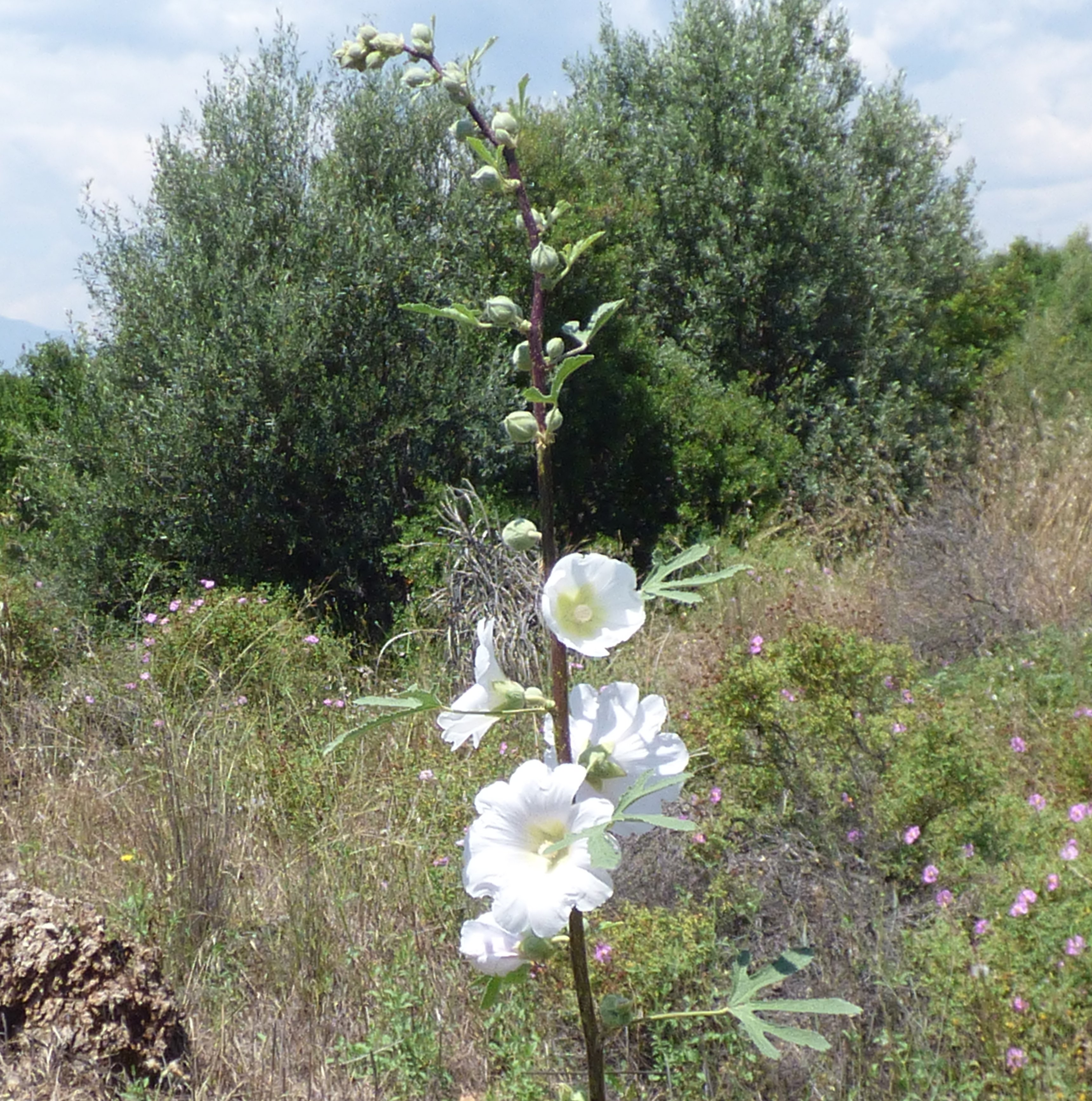
Topmost flowers

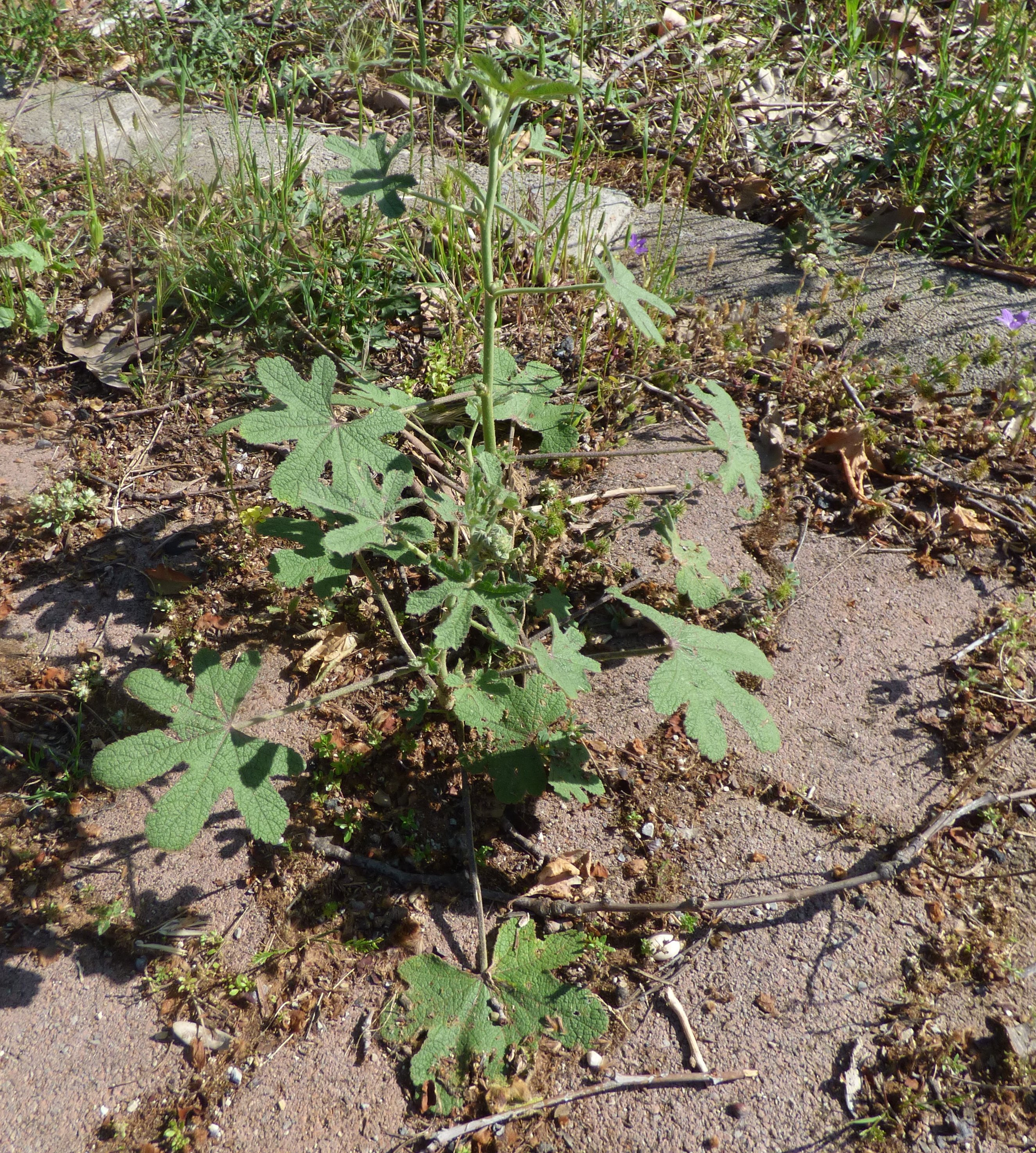
Growing plant

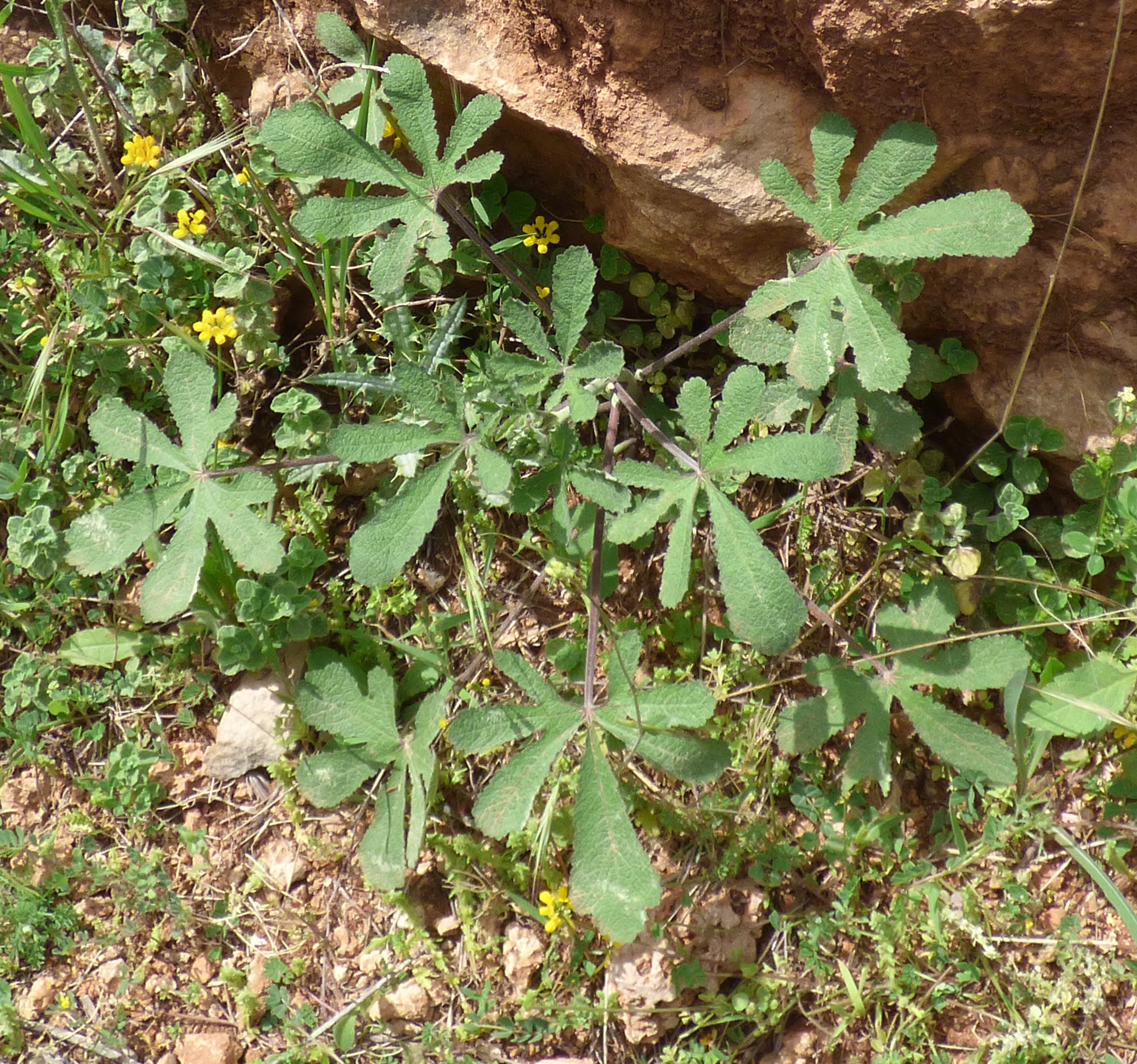
Growing plant

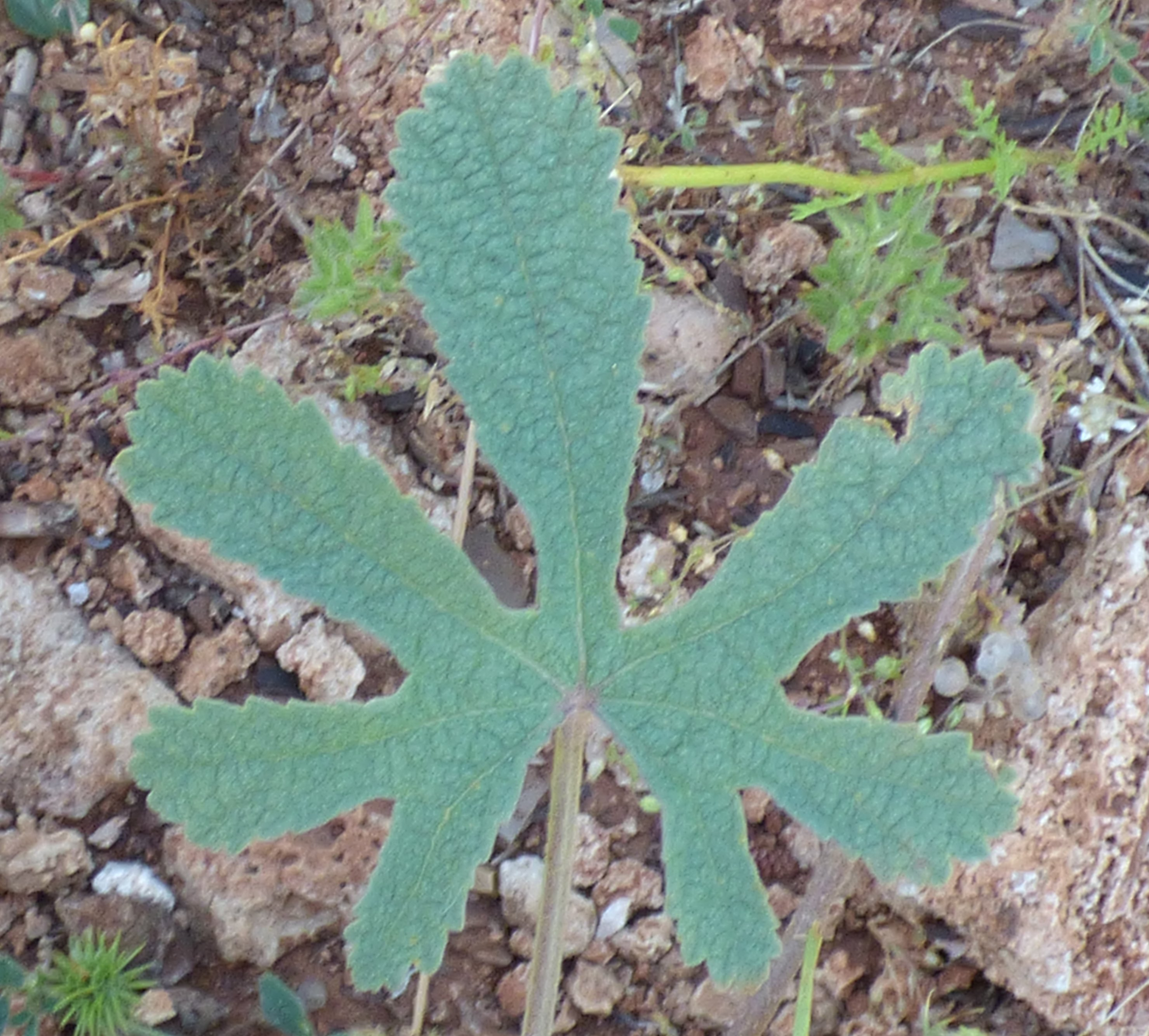
Leaf shape with end lobe only a little longer and base-lobes backward-pointing

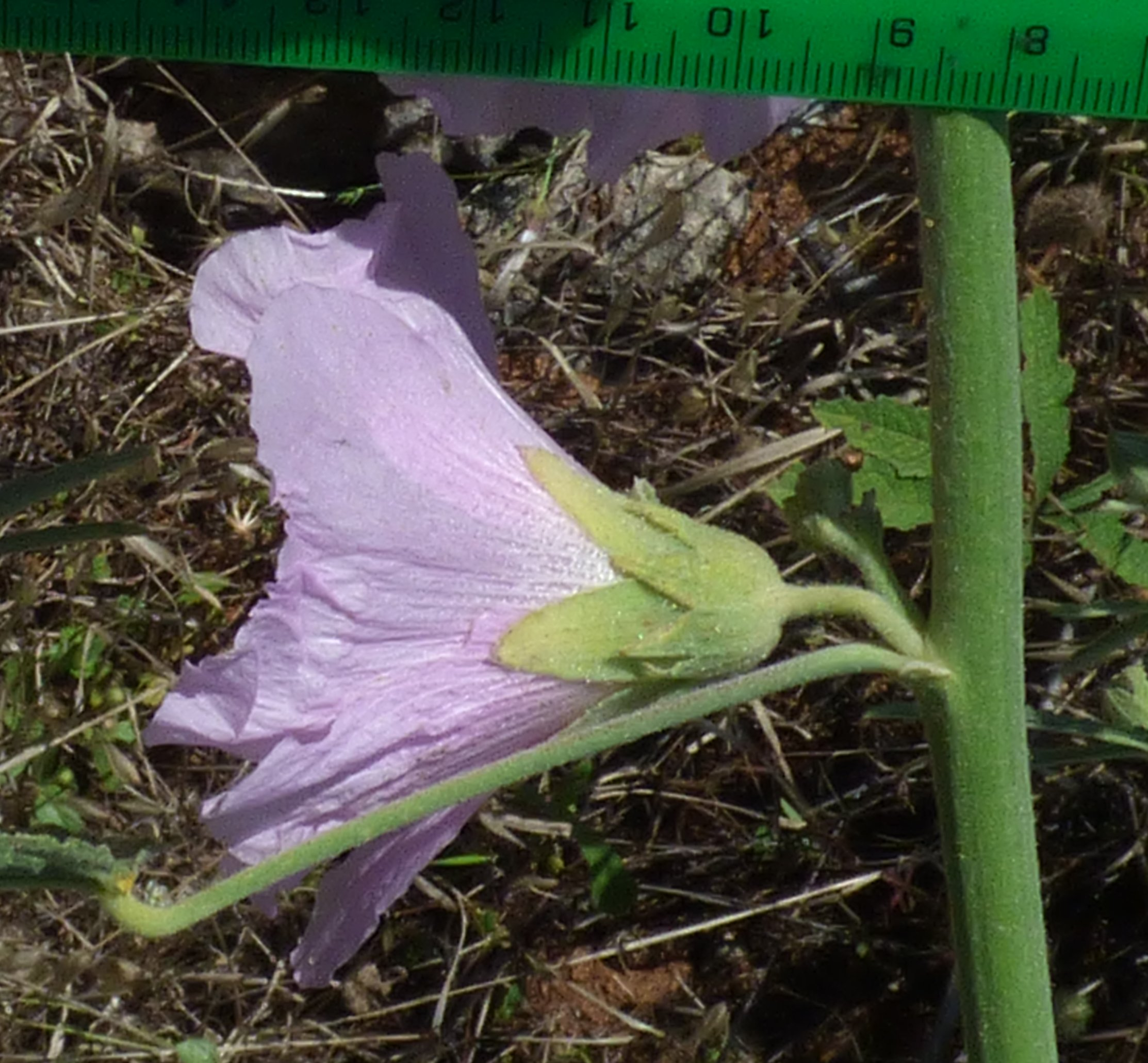
Flower side, showing stellate large epicalyx (>=50% calyx)

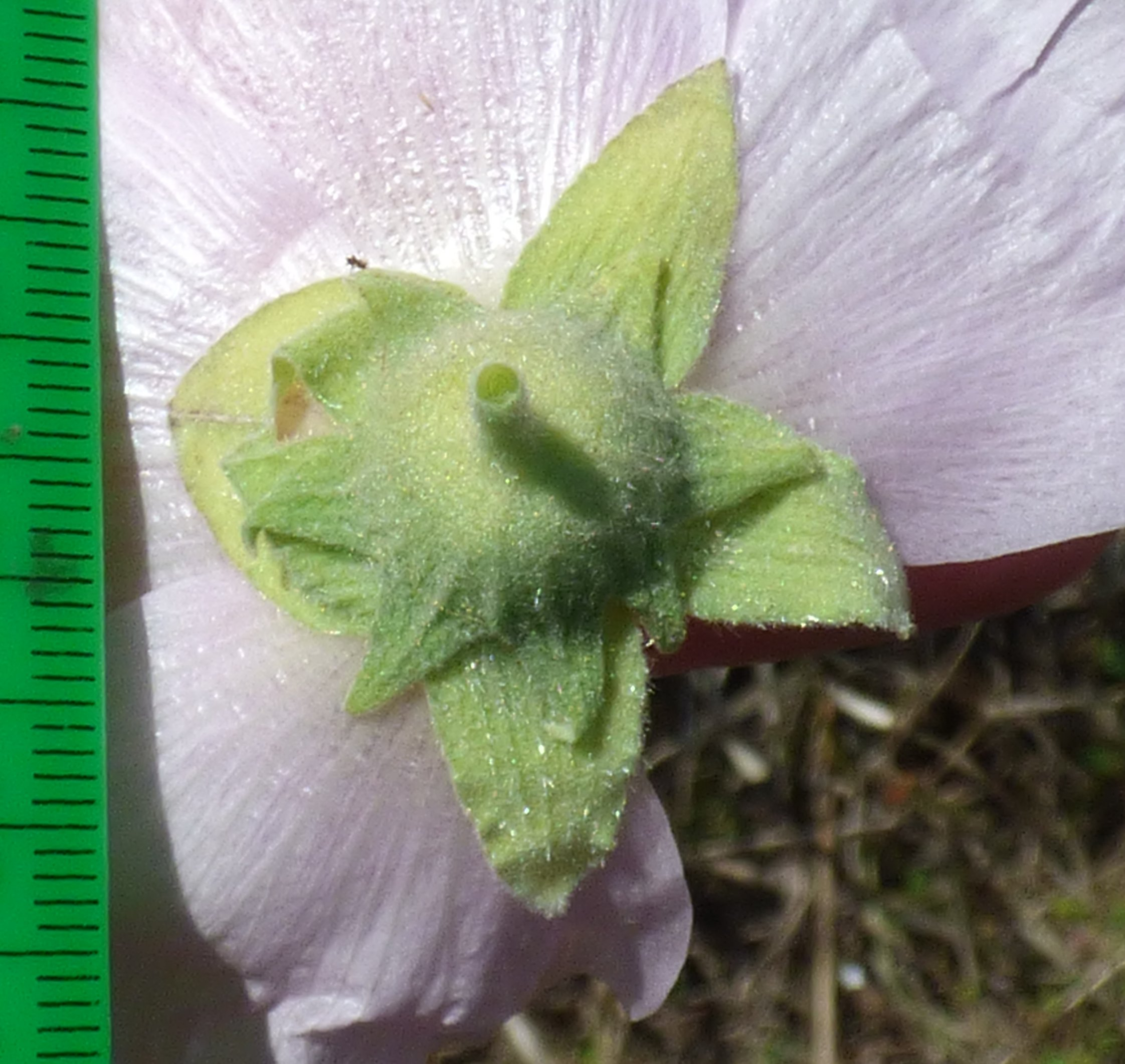
Flower underside

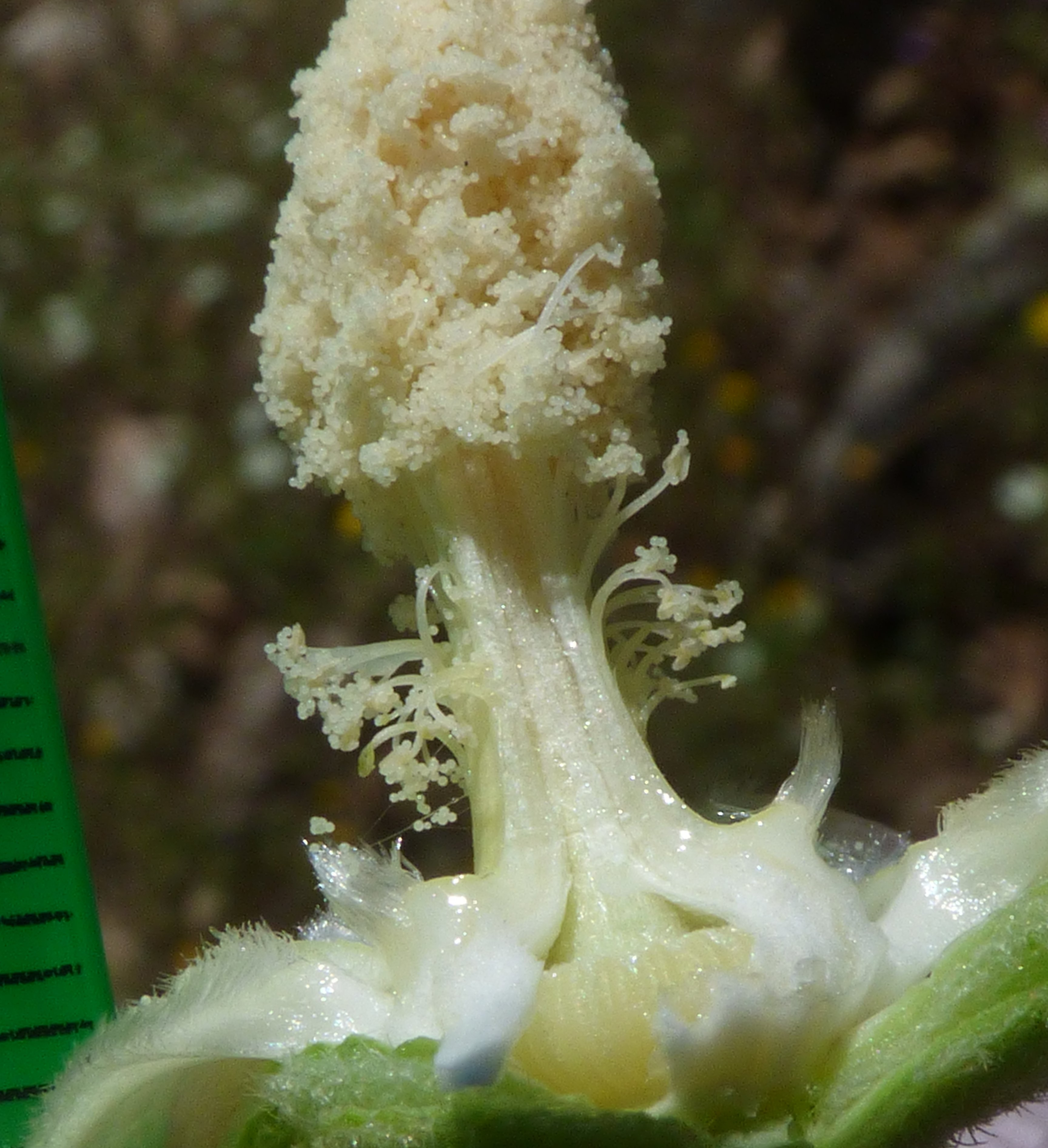
Floral organs in flower centre

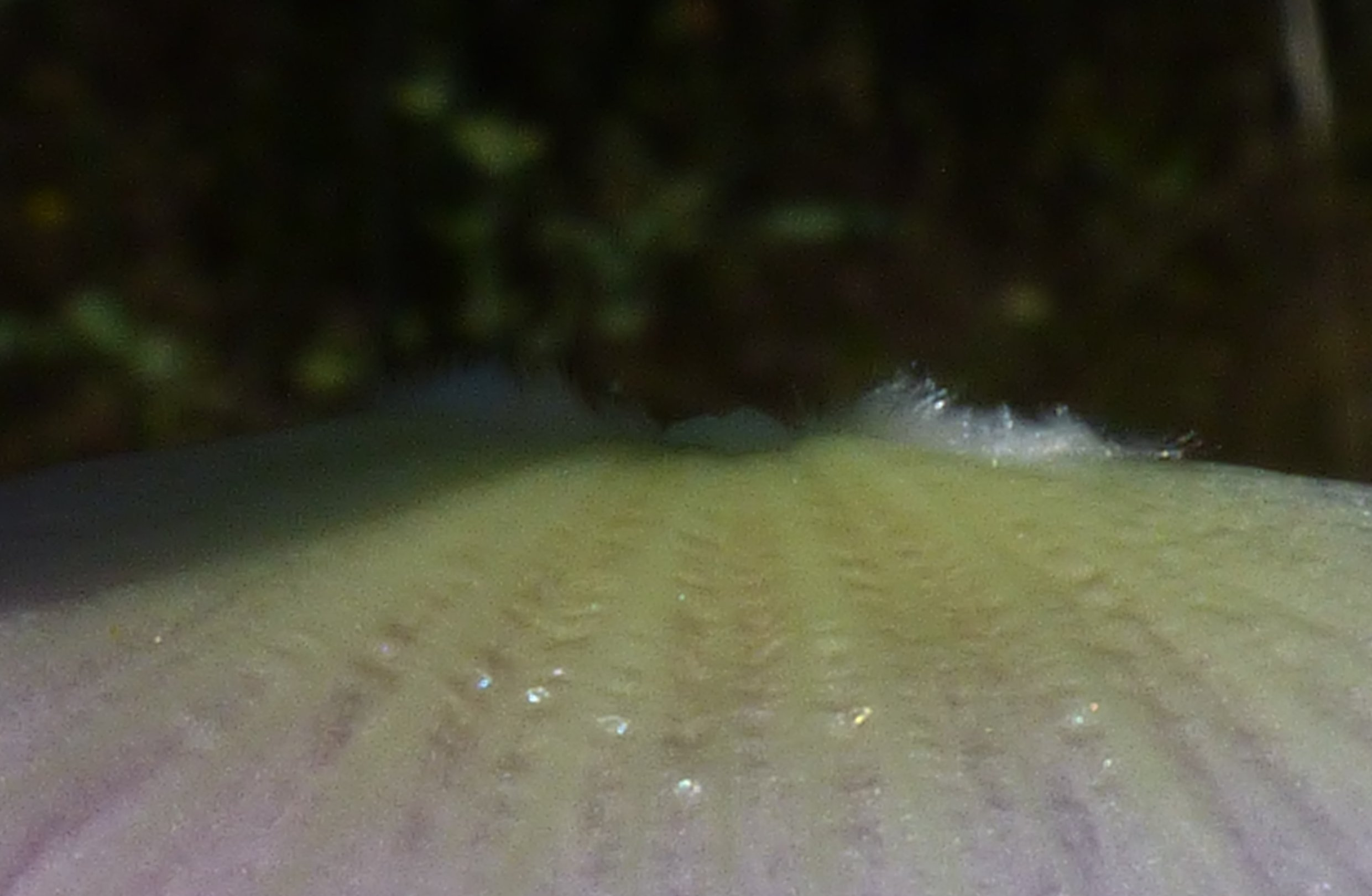
Petal base showing hairs

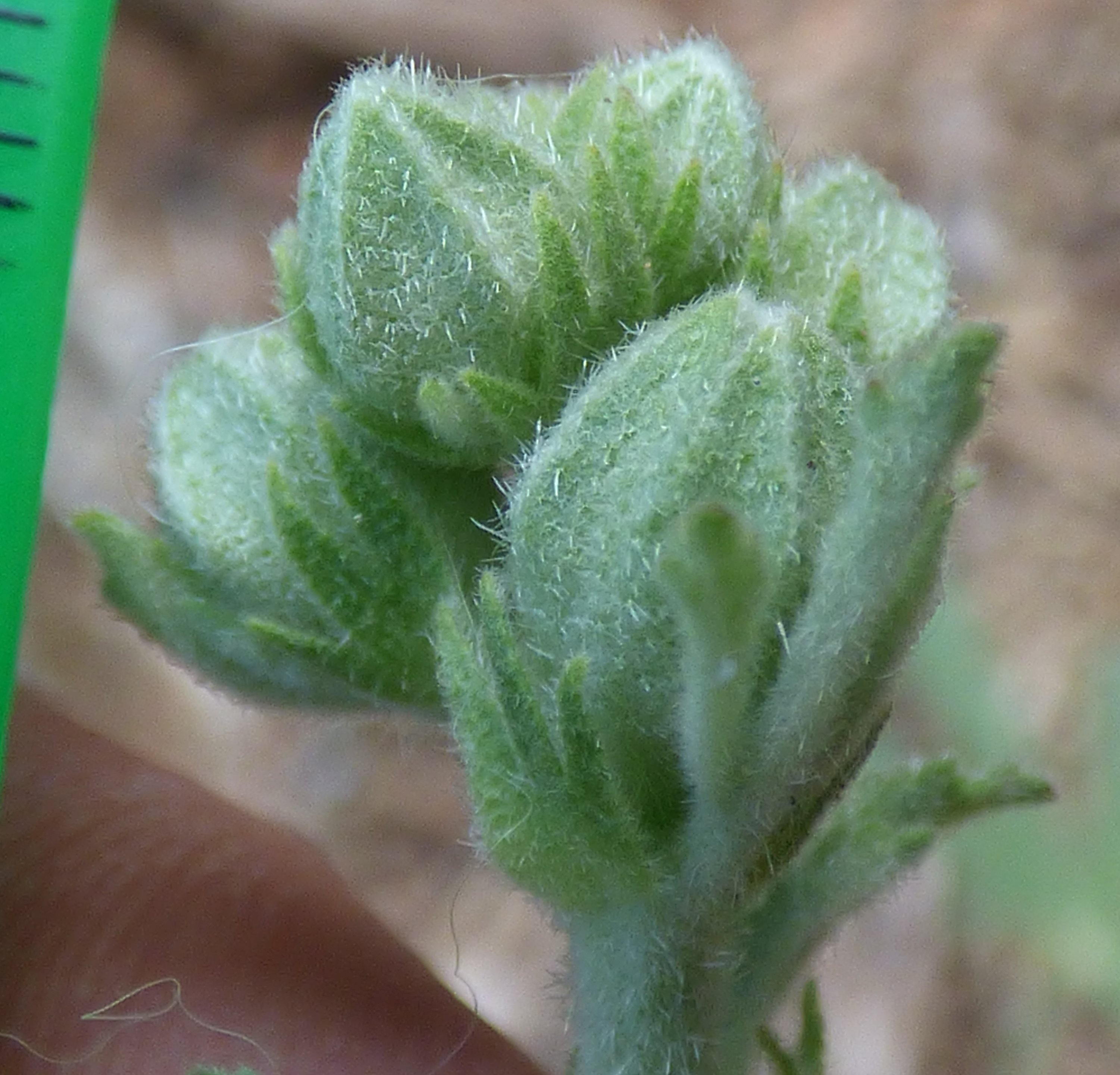
Buds, with smaller stellate hairs and large epicalyx

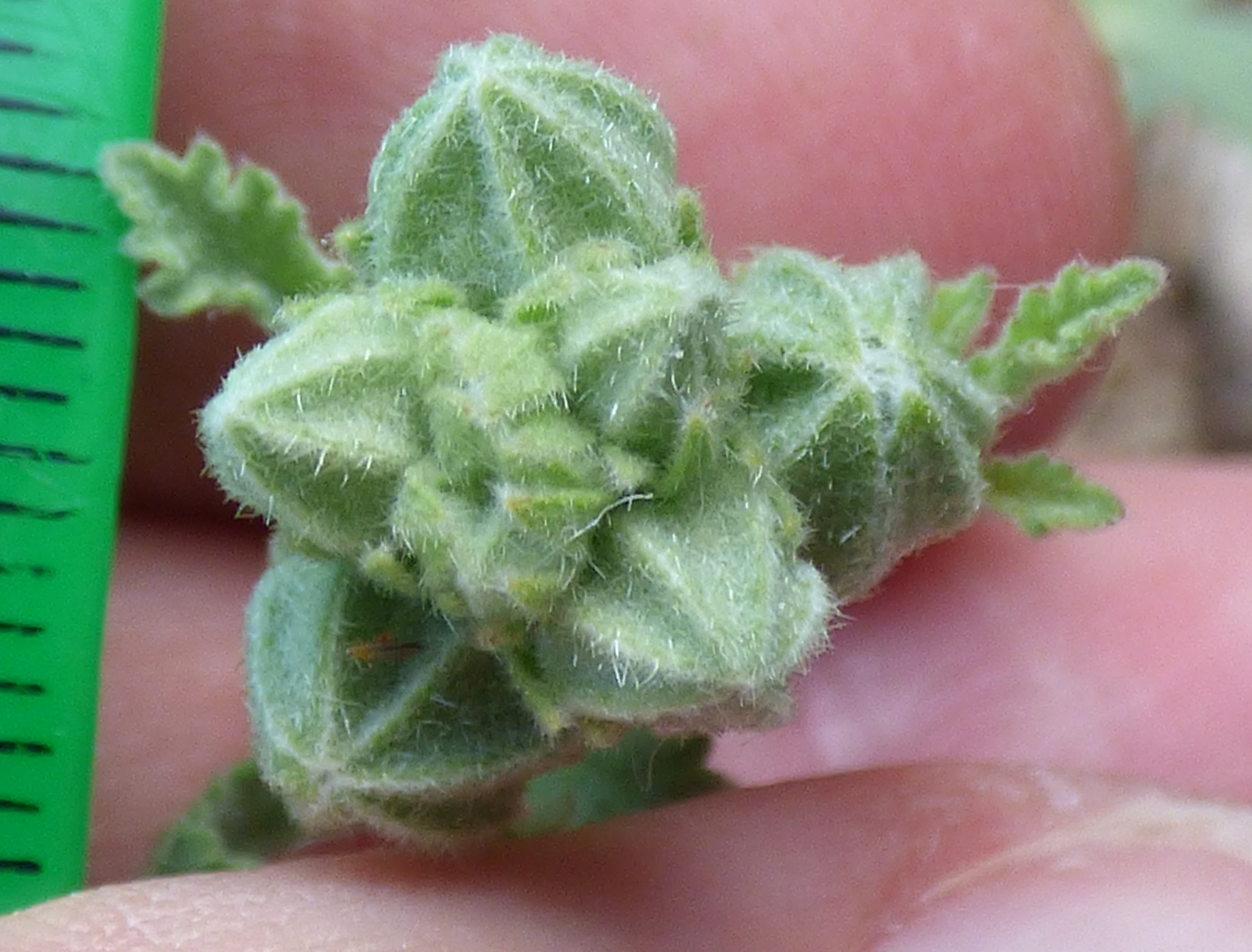
Buds, with smaller stellate hairs and large epicalyx

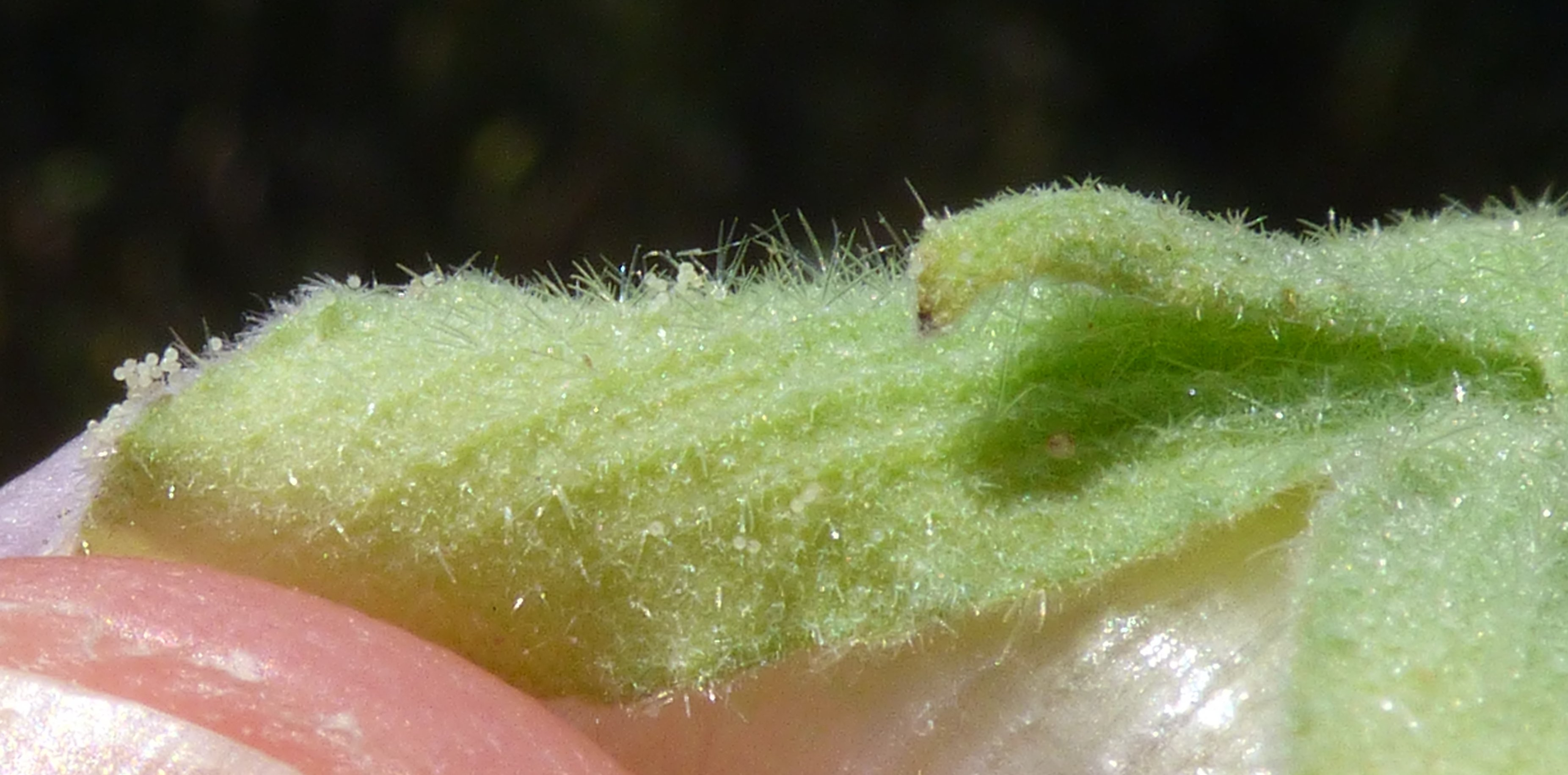
Calyx with stellate hairs

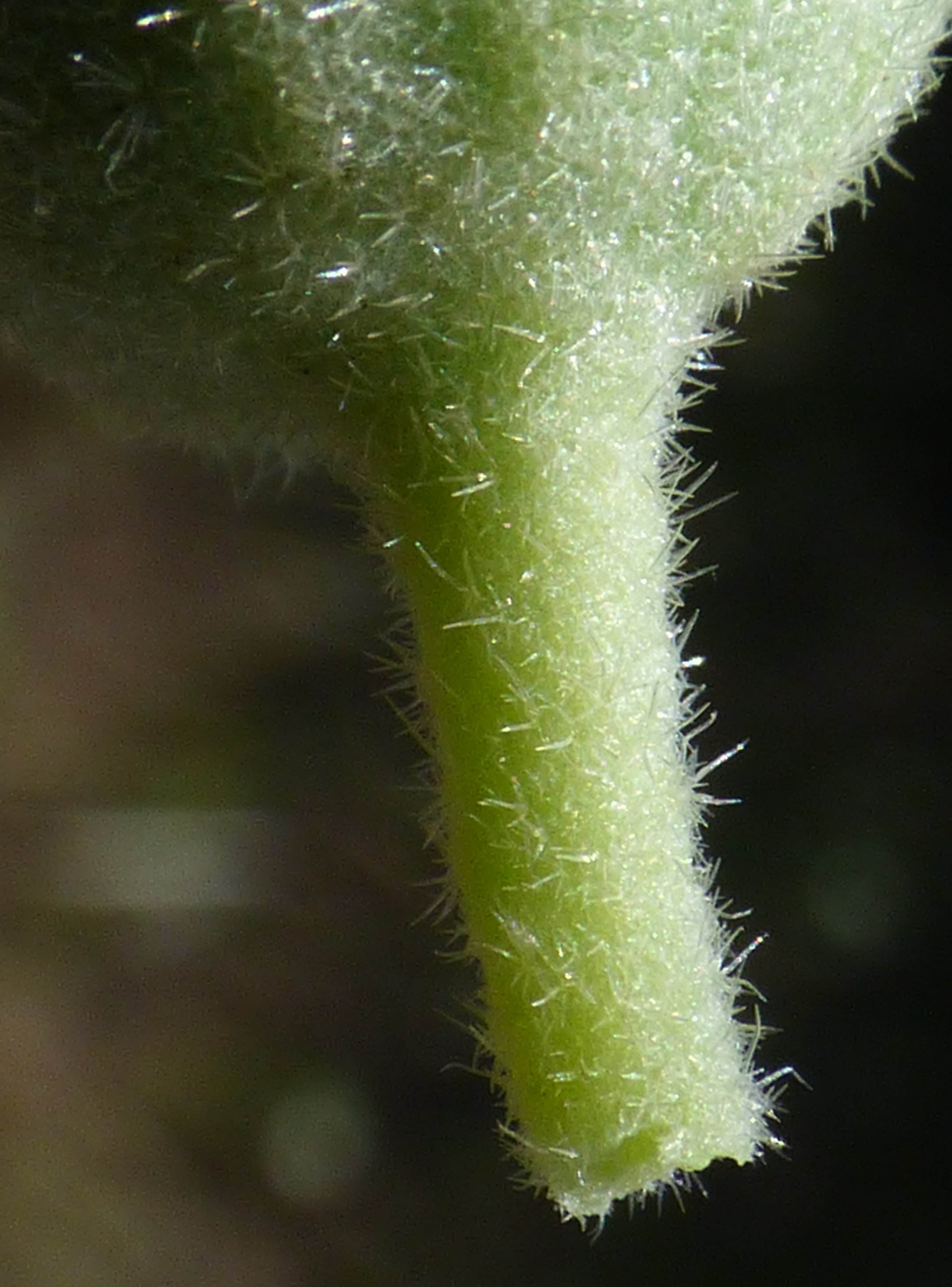
Flower stalk

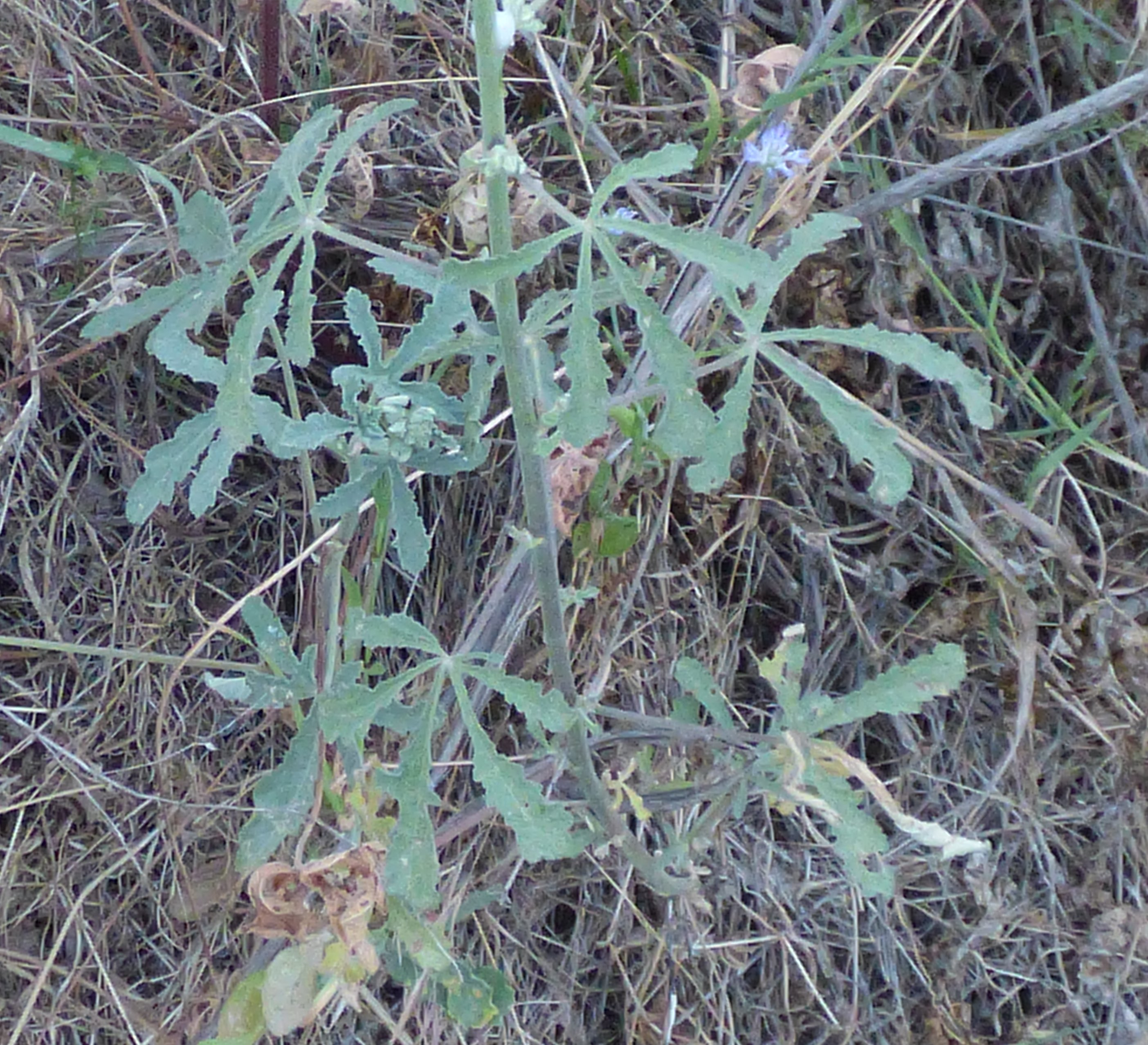
Leaf with narrower lobes

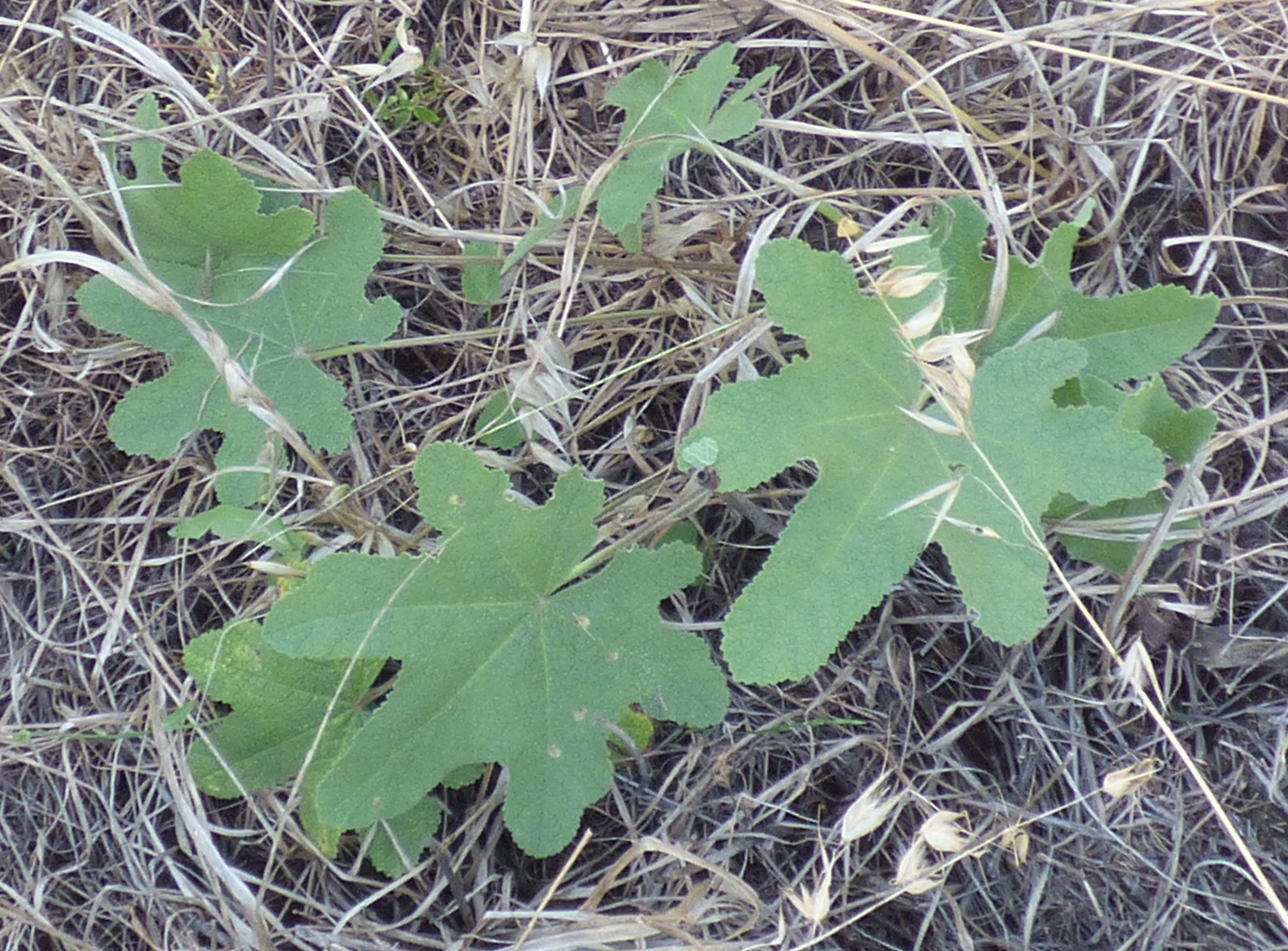
Leaf with broader lobes (lowest leaves may be very shallow-lobed)

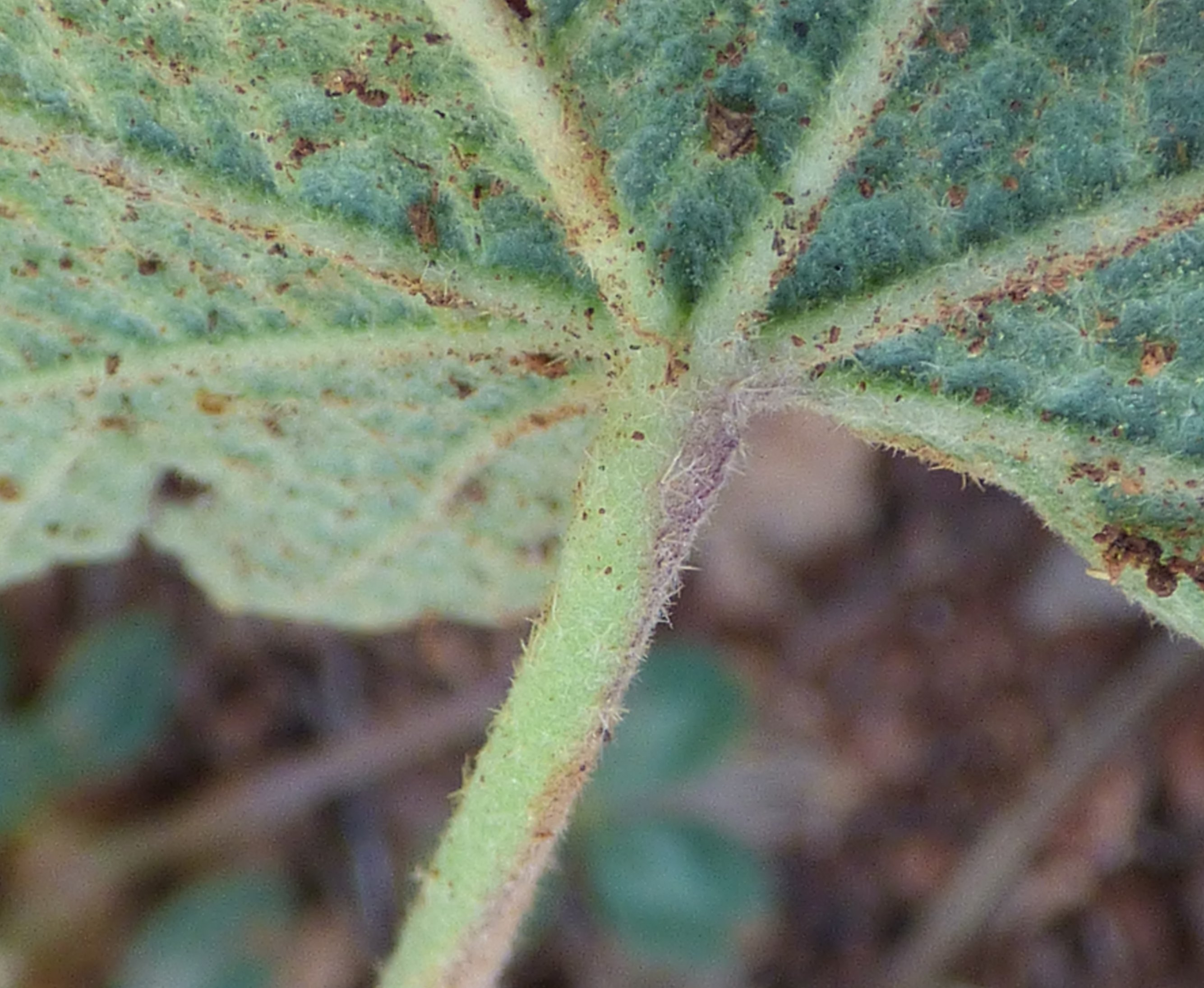
Leaf underside with coarse and fine stellate hairs (upper leaves less coarsely)

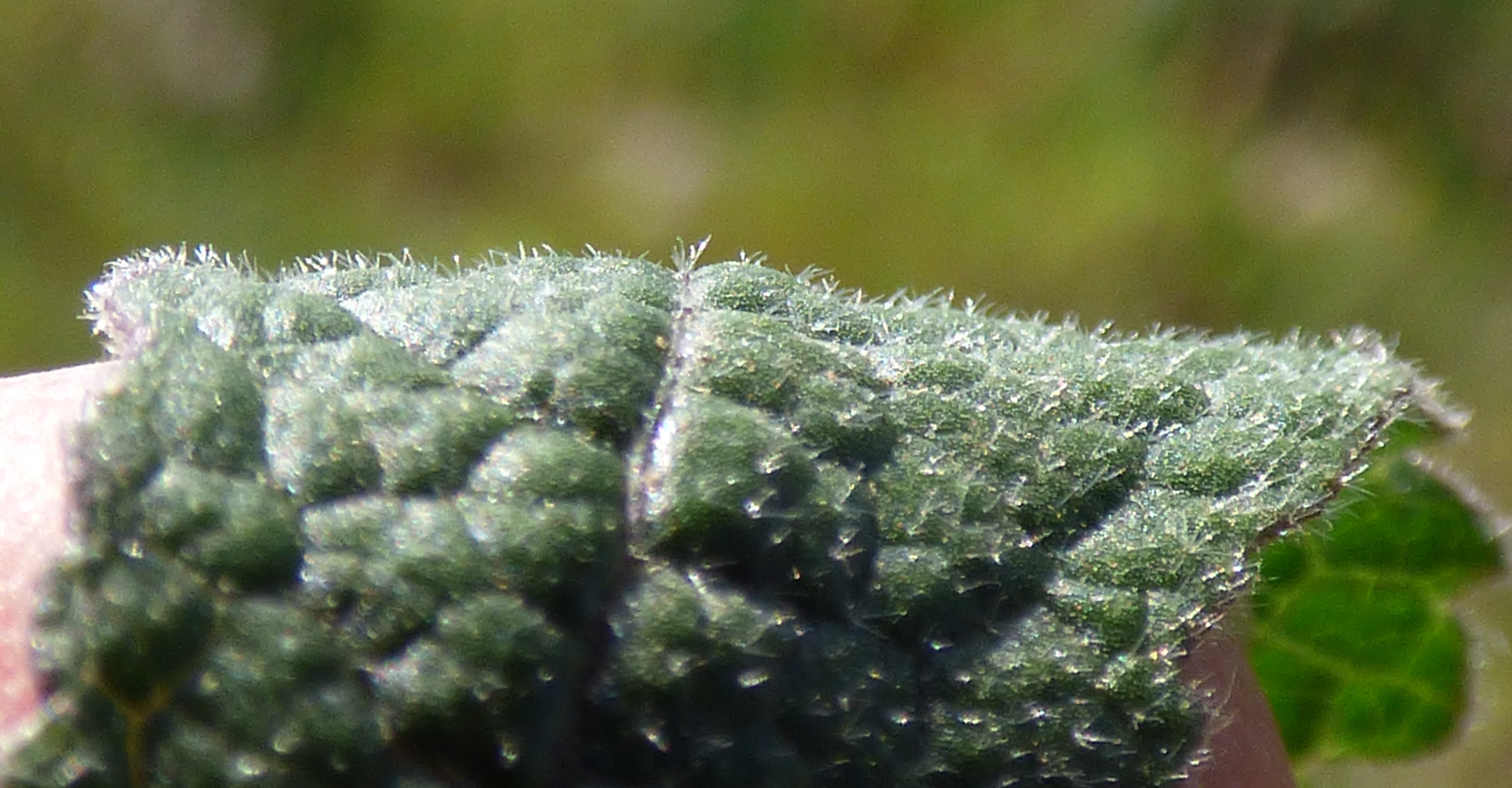
Leaf upperside

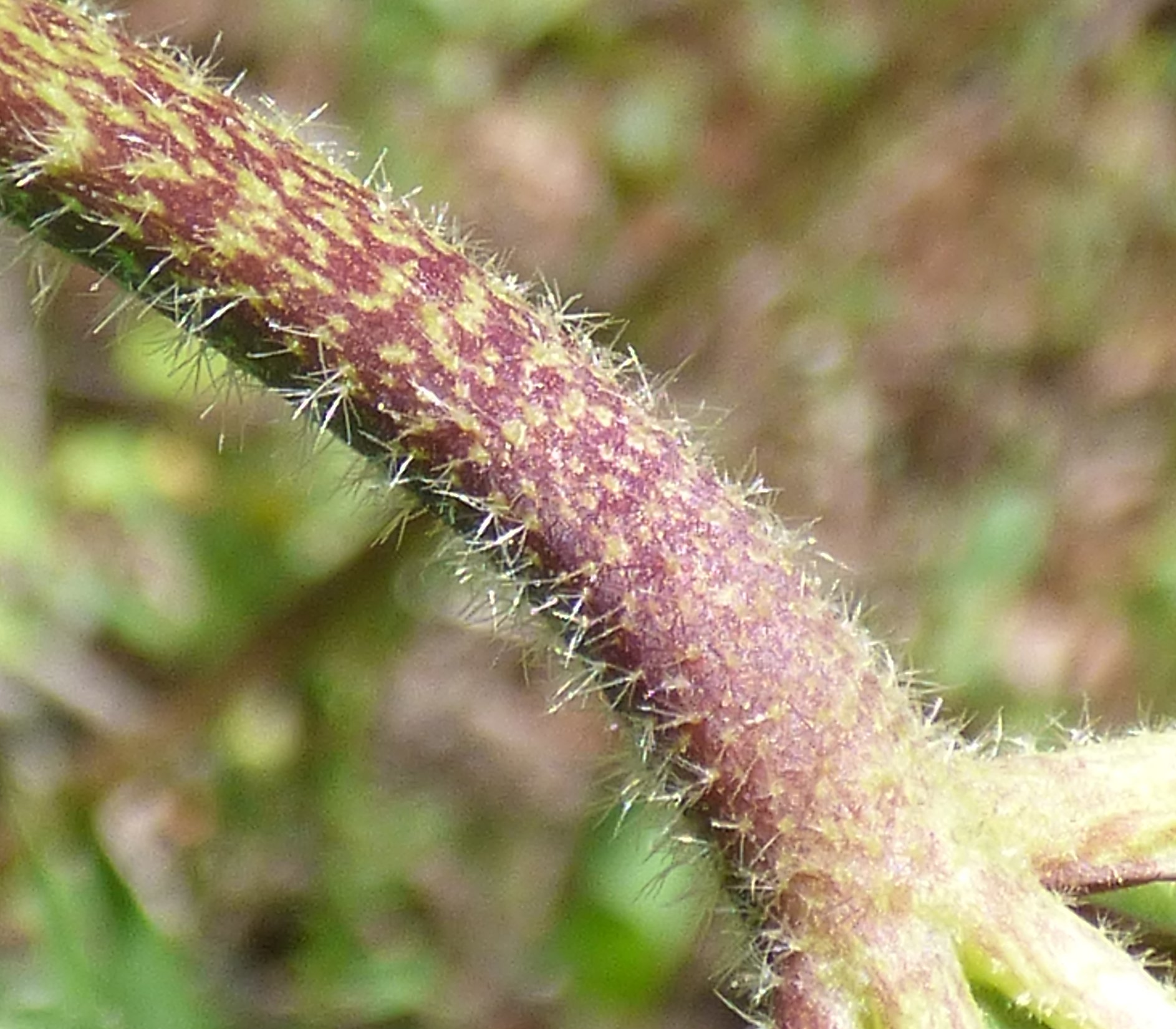
Leaf stalk with coarser hairs

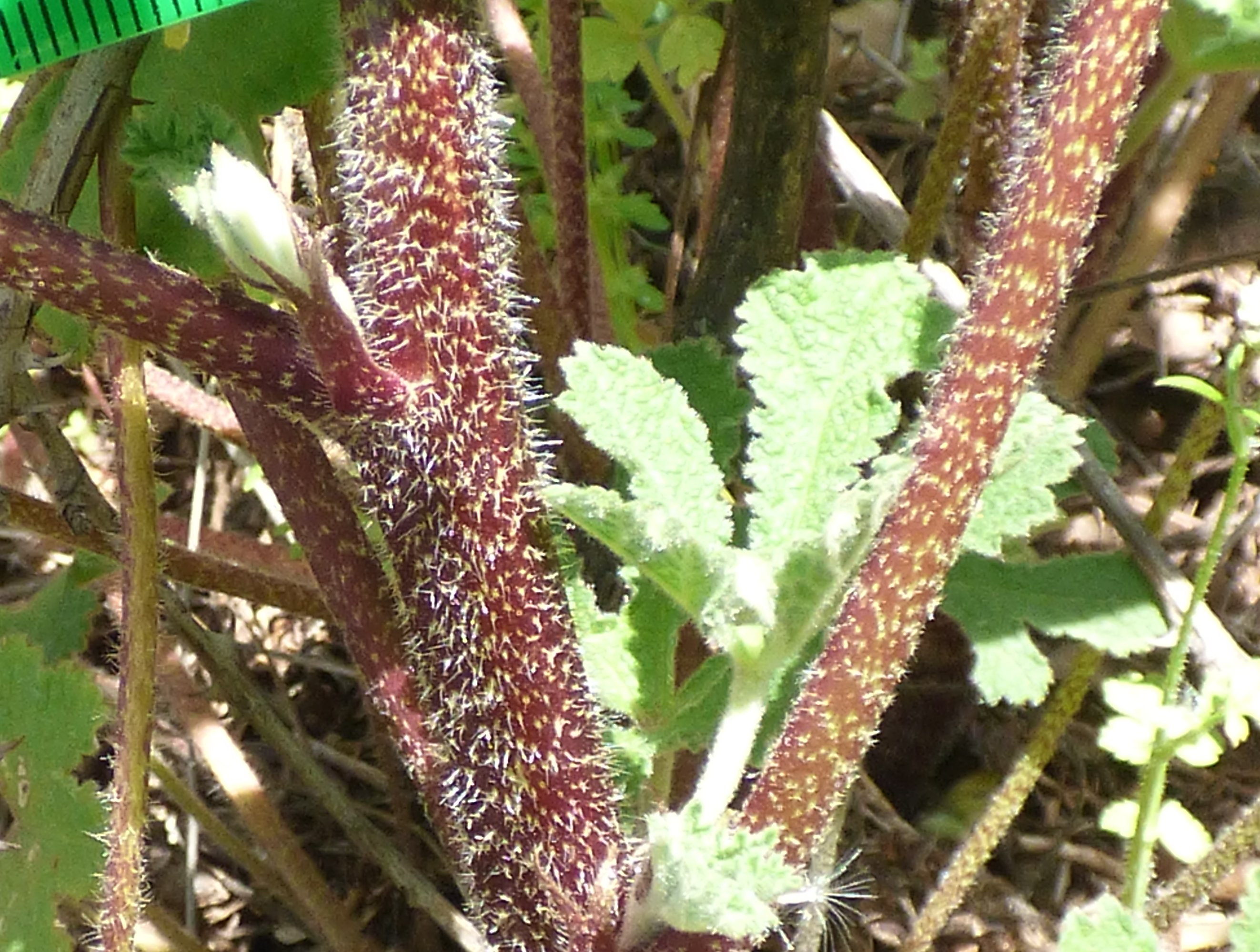
Stem with coarser hairs

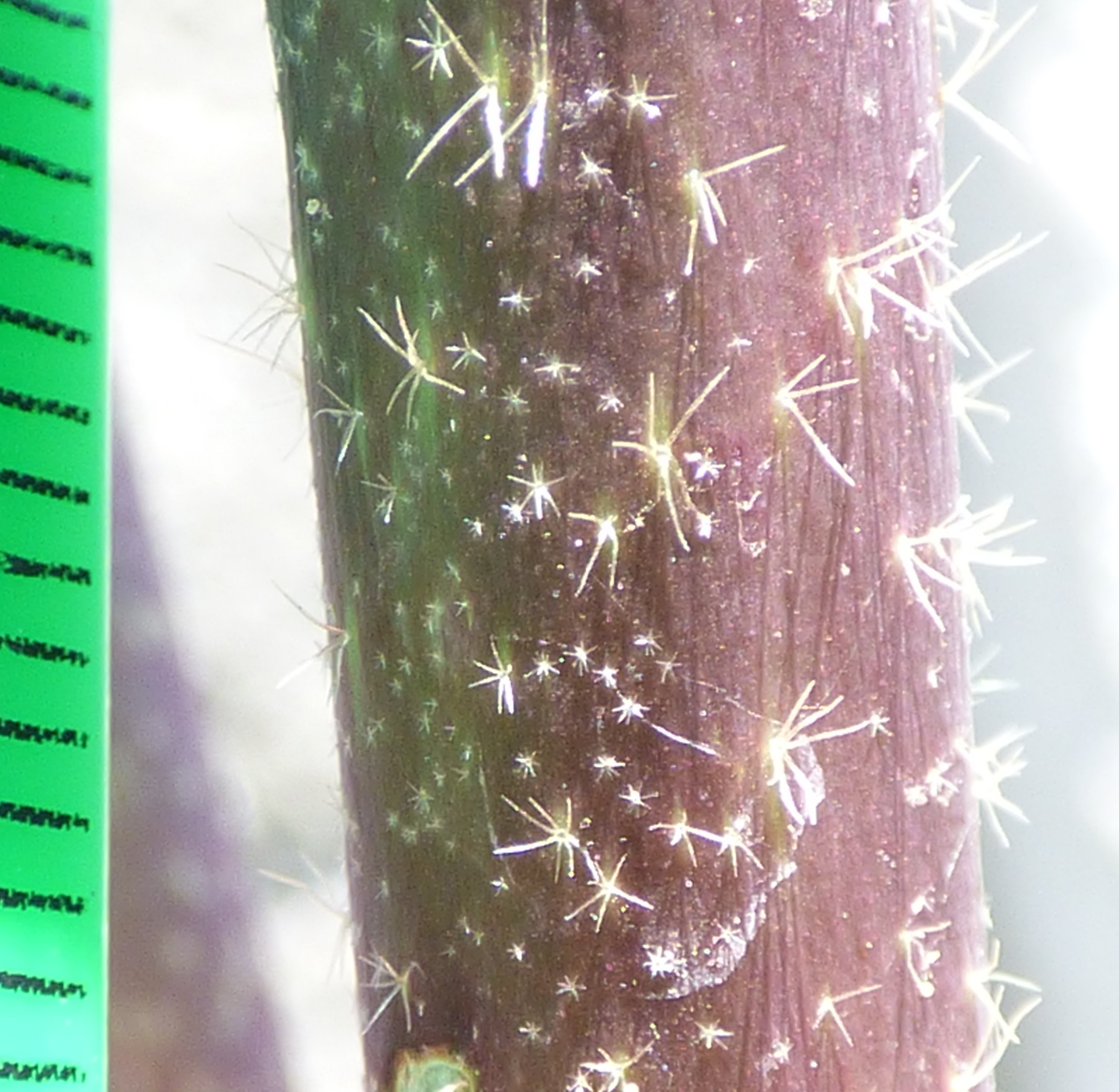
Stem with sparse hairs

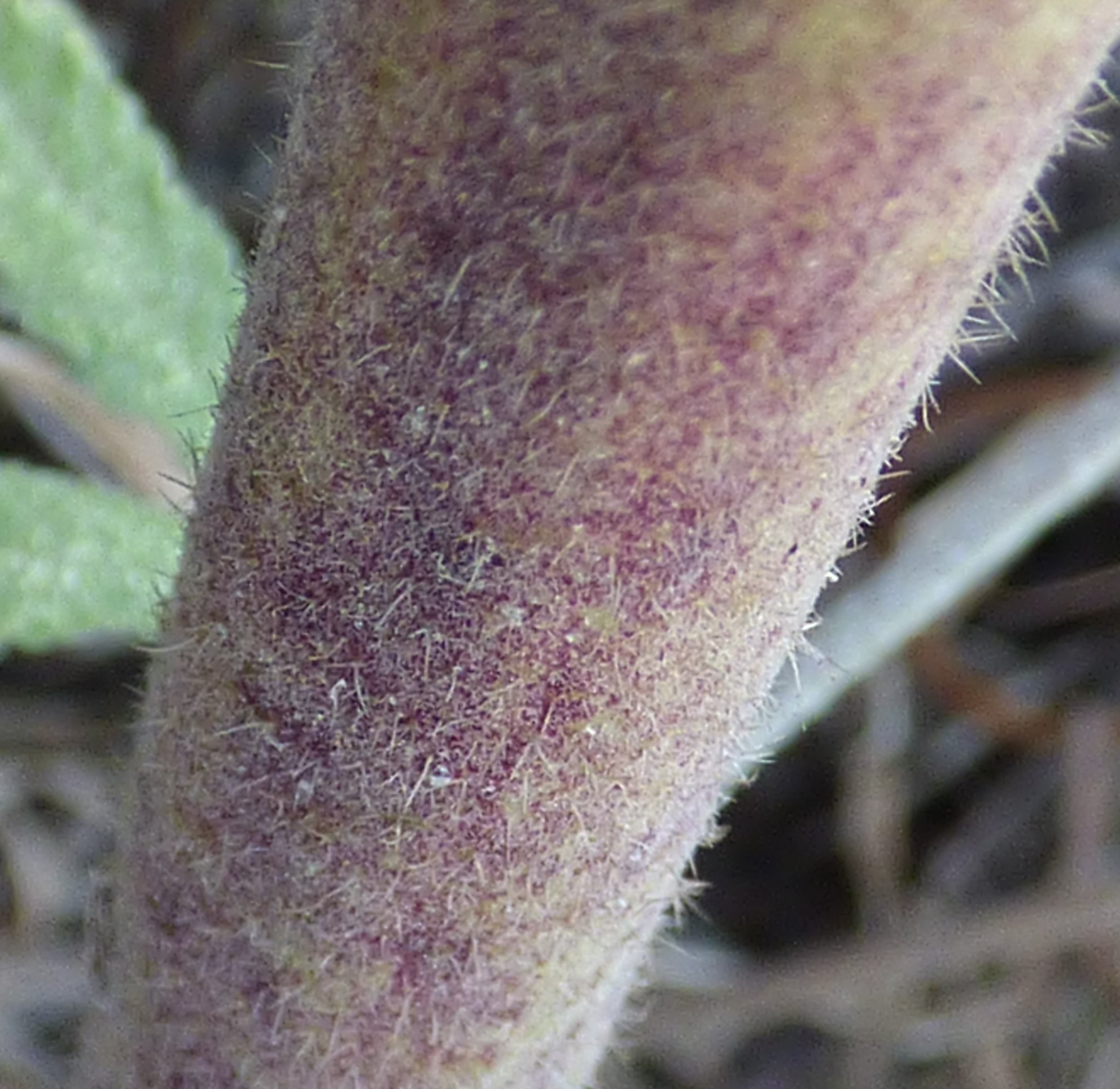
Stem with coarse and many less coarse hairs

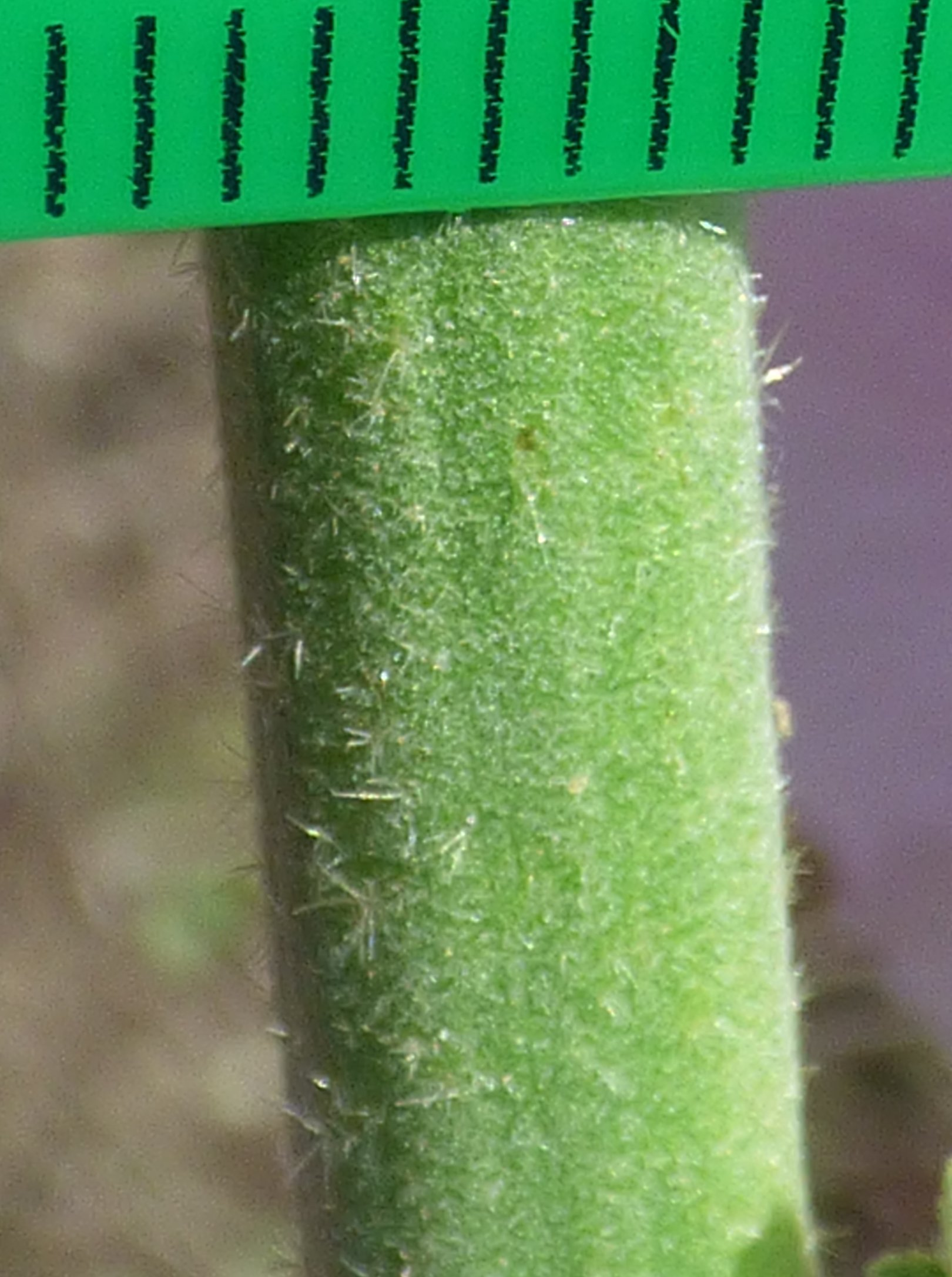
Inflorescence stem with less coarse hairs

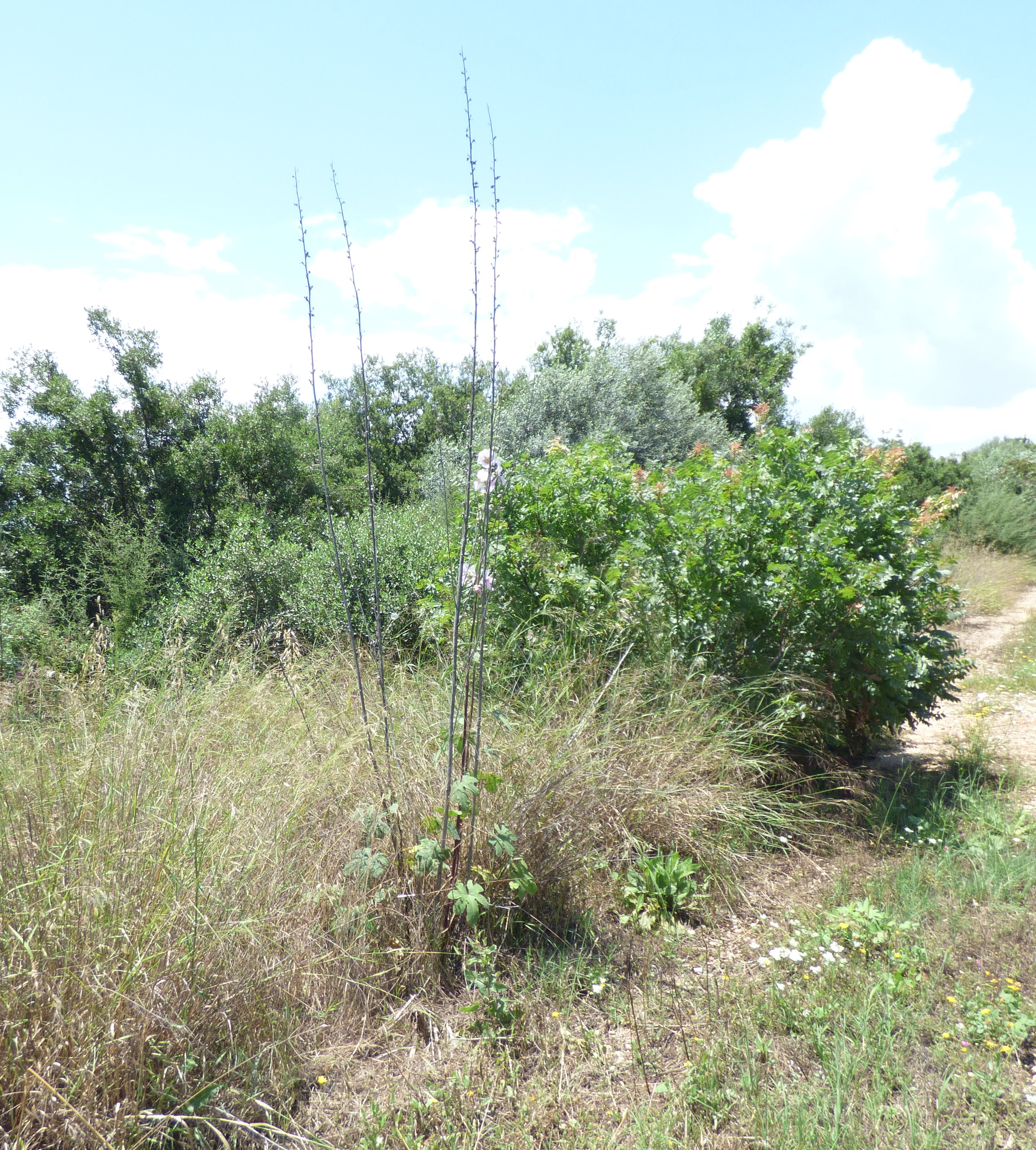
Exceptionally tall plant, in flower

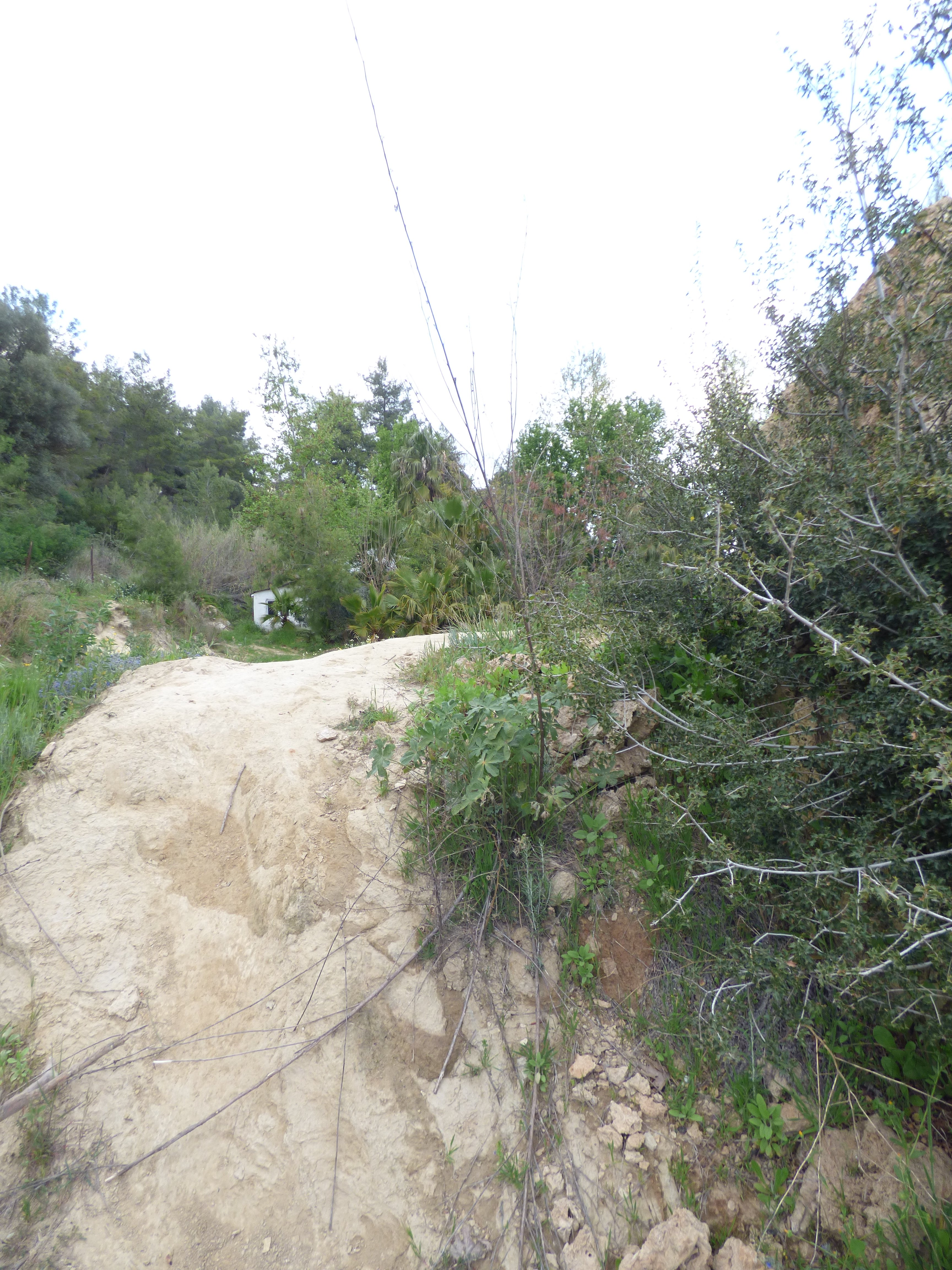
Exceptionally tall plant (reaching just beyond top of photo)
