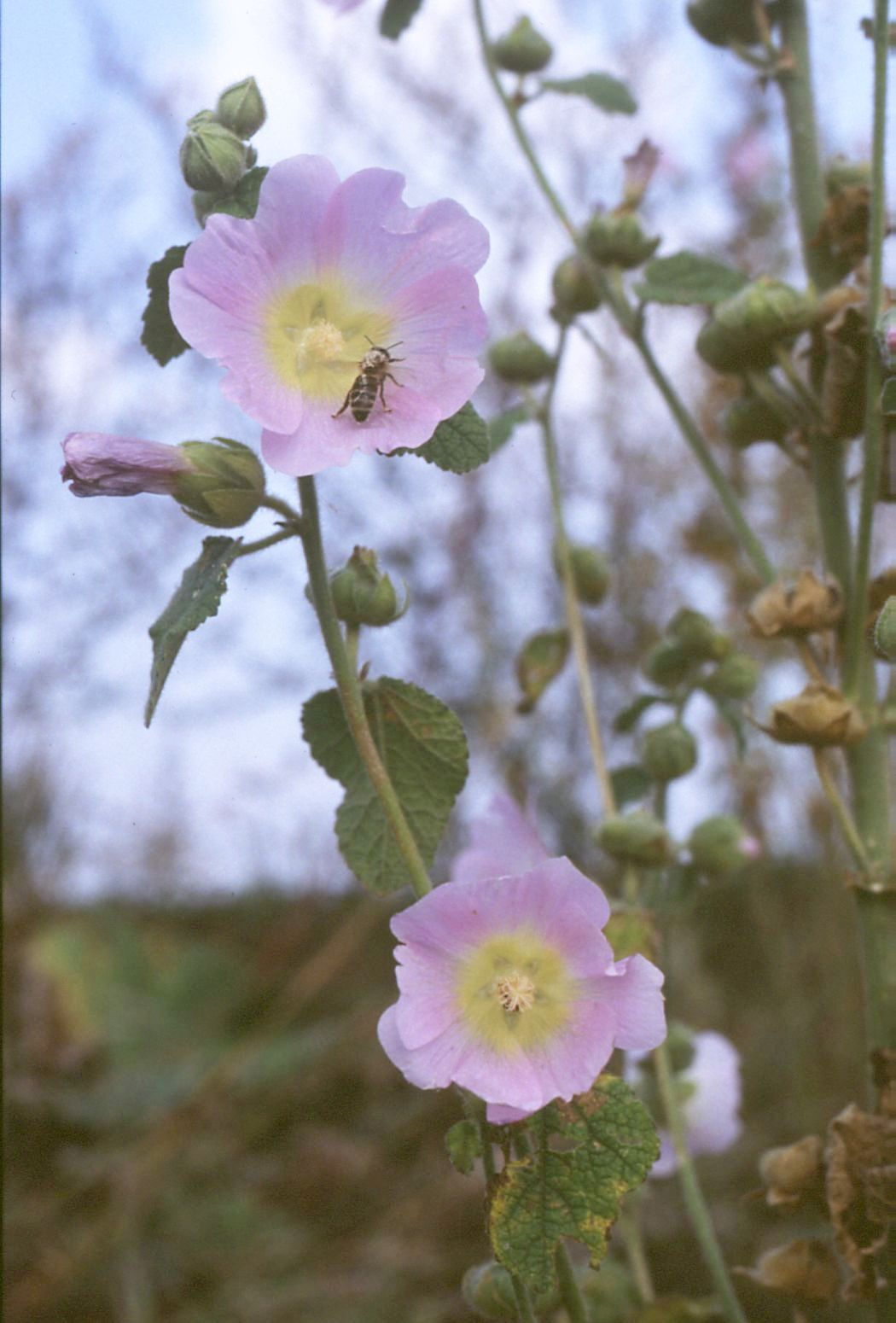

Scientific classification
- Kingdom: Plantae
- Clade: Embryophytes
- Clade: Tracheophytes
- Clade: Angiosperms
- Clade: Eudicots
- Clade: Rosids
- Order: Malvales
- Family: Malvaceae
- Genus: Alcea
- Species: A. biennis

Binomial name
- Alcea biennis Winterl

Synonyms
- A. pallida; Althaea pallida; Malva pallida

= Alcea biennis =

Species of flowering plant in the mallow family

Alcea biennis, the biennial hollyhock, is a species of Alcea in the mallow family, Malvaceae. Synonyms include A. pallida, Althaea pallida and Malva pallida.
