= A. armeniaca =

A. armeniaca may refer to:

An abbreviation of a species name. In binomial nomenclature the name of a species is always the name of the genus to which the species belongs, followed by the species name (also called the species epithet). In A. armeniaca the genus name has been abbreviated to A. and the species has been spelled out in full. In a document that uses this abbreviation it should always be clear from the context which genus name has been abbreviated.

Some of the most common uses of A. armeniaca are:

- Althaea armeniaca, a herb species
- Amanita armeniaca, a mushroom species in the genus Amanita
- Amara armeniaca, a beetle species
- Artemisia armeniaca, an abortifacient species in the genus Artemisia

== See also ==
- Armeniaca (disambiguation)
