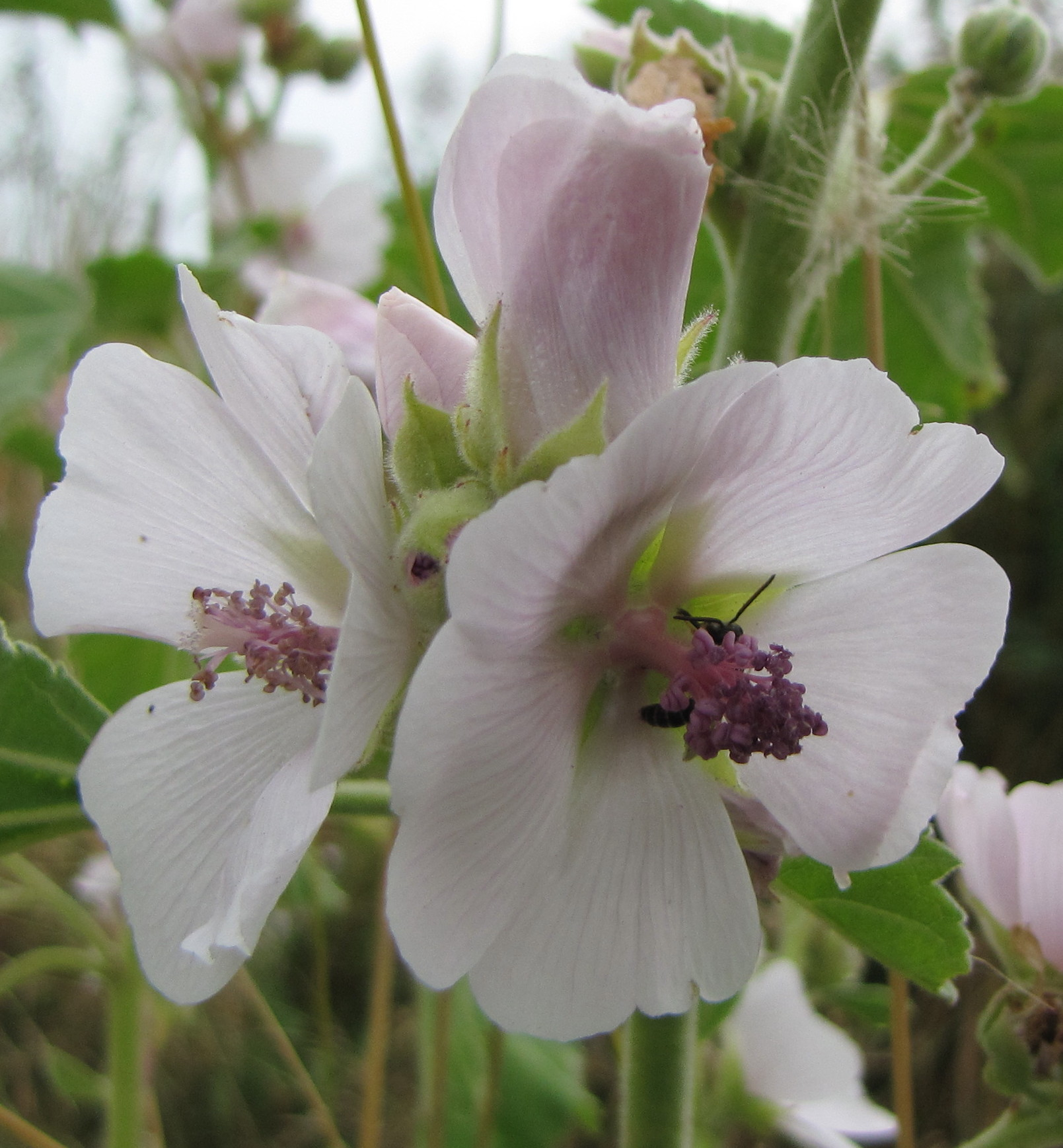
- Marshmallow (Althaea officinalis)

Scientific classification
- Kingdom: Plantae
- Clade: Tracheophytes
- Clade: Angiosperms
- Clade: Eudicots
- Clade: Rosids
- Order: Malvales
- Family: Malvaceae
- Subfamily: Malvoideae
- Tribe: Malveae
- Genus: Althaea; L.

Species
- See text

Synonyms
- Ferberia Scop.

= Althaea (plant) =

Genus of flowering plants

Althaea is a genus of herbaceous perennial plants native to Europe, North Africa and western Asia. It includes Althaea officinalis, also known as the marshmallow plant, whence the fluffy confection got its name. They are found on the banks of rivers and in salt marshes, preferring moist, sandy soils. The stems grow to 1–2 m tall, and flower in mid summer. The leaves are palmately lobed with 3–7 lobes. Althaea species are used as food plants by the larvae of some Lepidoptera species including Bucculatrix quadrigemina.

== Species ==
As of November 2025, Plants of the World Online accepts the nine species. The genus formerly included a number of additional species now treated in the genus Alcea (hollyhocks).

- Althaea armeniaca Ten.
- Althaea bertramii Post & Beauverd
- Althaea cannabina L.
- Althaea hiri Parsa
- Althaea officinalis L.
- Althaea oppenheimii Ulbr.
- Althaea × pavisii Guétrot
- Althaea taurinensis DC.
- Althaea villosa Blatt.
- Althaea vranjensis Diklić & V.Nikolić

== Chemical constituents ==
The root contains starch (37%), mucilage (11%), pectin (11%), flavonoids, phenolic acids, sucrose, and asparagine.

== Uses ==
The traditional medicinal uses of the plant are reflected in the name of the genus, which comes from the Greek althainein, meaning "to heal".

The flowers and young leaves can be eaten, and are often added to salads or are boiled and fried. The roots and stem also secrete mucilage, which is used to soften the skin, and is used in cosmetic treatments.

The Roman poet Horace refers to his own diet in his Odes, which he describes as very simple: "As for me, olives, endives, and smooth mallows provide sustenance."

The root has been used since Egyptian antiquity in a honey-sweetened confection useful in the treatment of sore throat.

The root's emulsifying property is used for cleaning Persian carpets in the Middle East. It is regarded as the best method to preserve the vibrancy of vegetable dyes used in coloring the carpet's wool.

== Gallery ==
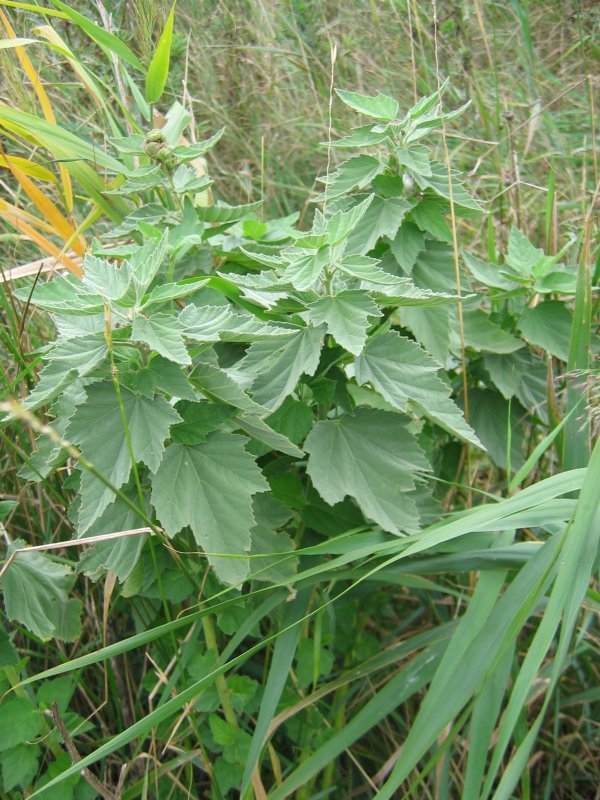
A. officinalis

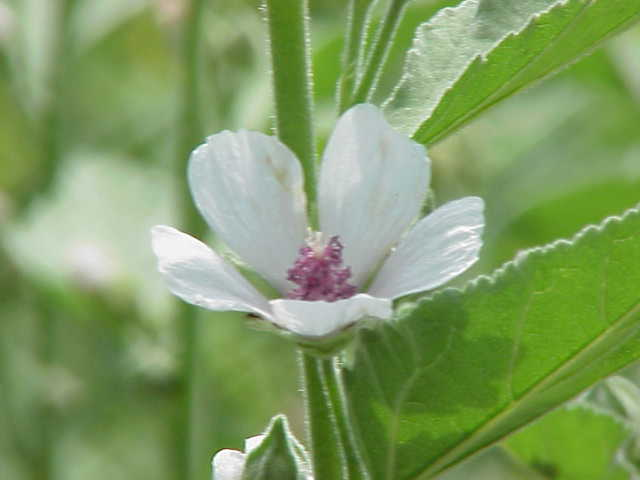
A. officinalis
