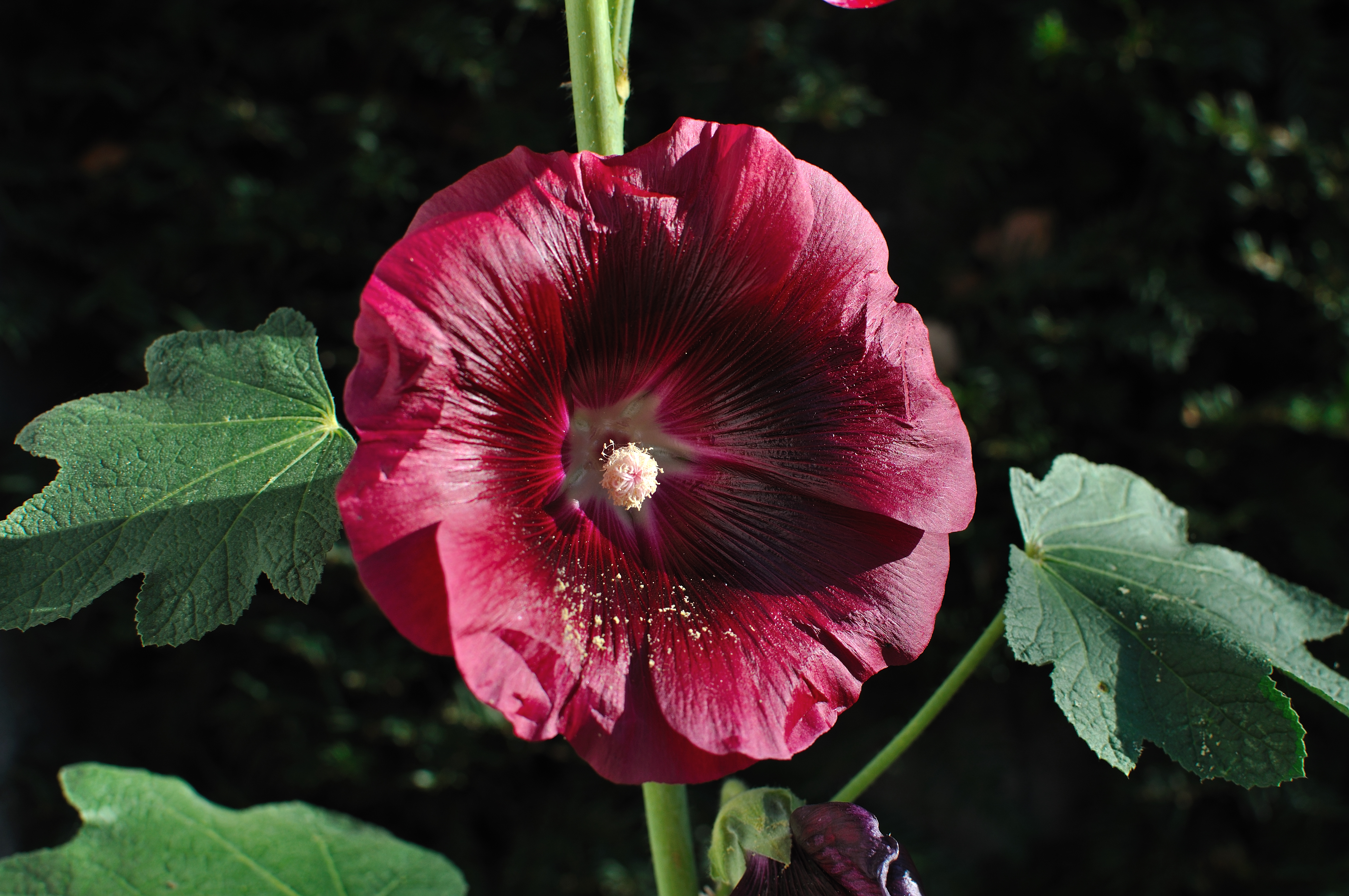

Scientific classification
- Kingdom: Plantae
- Clade: Tracheophytes
- Clade: Angiosperms
- Clade: Eudicots
- Clade: Rosids
- Order: Malvales
- Family: Malvaceae
- Genus: Alcea
- Species: A. rosea

Binomial name
- Alcea rosea L.

Synonyms
- List: Althaea rosea (L.) Cav.; Alcea annua Winterl; Alcea cretica (Weinm.) Greuter; Alcea microchiton Alef.; Althaea caribaea Sims; Althaea chinensis Wall.; Althaea coromandeliana Cav.; Althaea cretica Weinm.; Althaea flexuosa Sims; Althaea meonantha Link; Althaea mexicana Kunze; Althaea microchiton (Alef.) Baker f.; Althaea sinensis Cav.; Malva florida Salisb.; Malva hortensus K.F.Schimp. & Spenn.

= Alcea rosea =

Species of flowering plant

Alcea rosea, the common hollyhock, is an ornamental dicot flowering plant in the family Malvaceae. It was imported into Europe from southwestern China during, or possibly before, the 15th century. William Turner, a herbalist of the time, gave it the name "holyoke" from which the English name derives.

== Description ==
Alcea rosea is a 2.4 metres (8 feet) tall plant with large flowers around 13 centimetres (5 in) in diameter. Its leaves are large and heart-shaped.

== Ecology ==
The flowers attract hummingbirds in the Americas, and butterflies.

=== Pests and diseases ===
The leaves are vulnerable to rust, leaf spot and anthracnose. Pest problems include Japanese beetle and spider mites; though damage to the leaves can be extensive, the flowers are rarely affected. In contrast, females of the hollyhock weevil (Rhopalapion longirostre) bore holes into the flower calyx of the plants in which they lay their eggs. The larvae that hatch then feed upon the developing seeds, leaving each resulting pod full of desiccated husks of the seeds.

== Cultivation ==
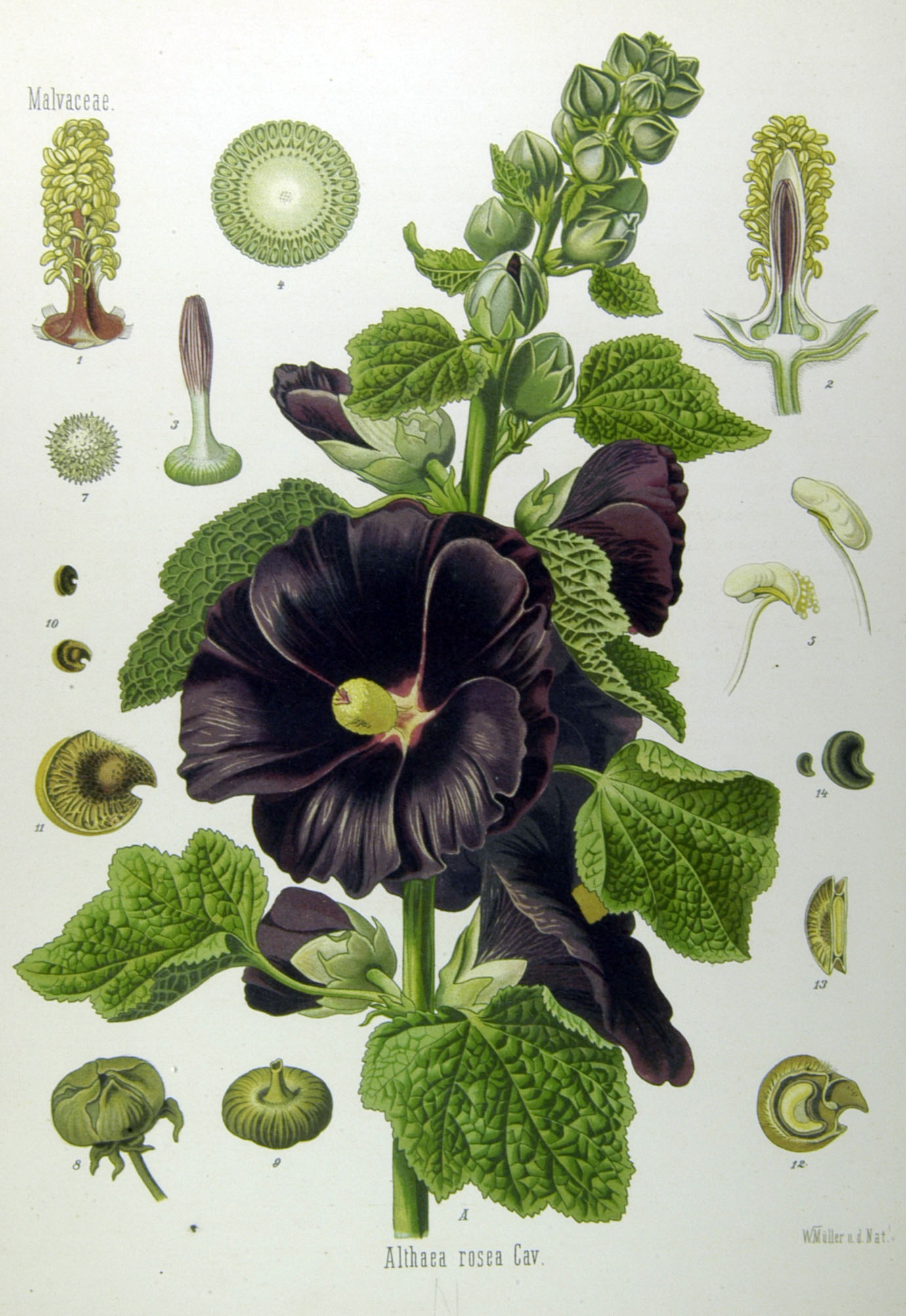
Illustration, 1897

Alcea rosea is variously described as a biennial (having a two-year life cycle), as an annual, or as a short-lived perennial. It frequently self-sows, which may create a perception that the plants are perennial. The plant may flower during its first year when sown early. It will grow in a wide range of soils, and can easily reach a height of 2.4 m (8 ft)

The flowers are in a range of colours from white to dark red, including pink, yellow and orange. Different colours prefer different soils. The darker red variety seems to favour sandy soils, while the lighter colour seems to favour clay soils. The plants are easily grown from seed, and readily self-seed. However, tender plants, whether young from seed or from old stock, may be wiped out by slugs and snails. The foliage is subject to attack from rust fungus, which may be treated with fungicides. Commercial growers have reported that some closely related species (Alcea ficifolia and A. rugosa) are resistant to this fungus.

== Herbalism ==
In herbal medicine, which may lack evidence, hollyhock is believed to be an emollient and laxative. It is thought to control inflammation, to stop bedwetting and as a mouthwash in cases of bleeding gums.

== Gallery ==
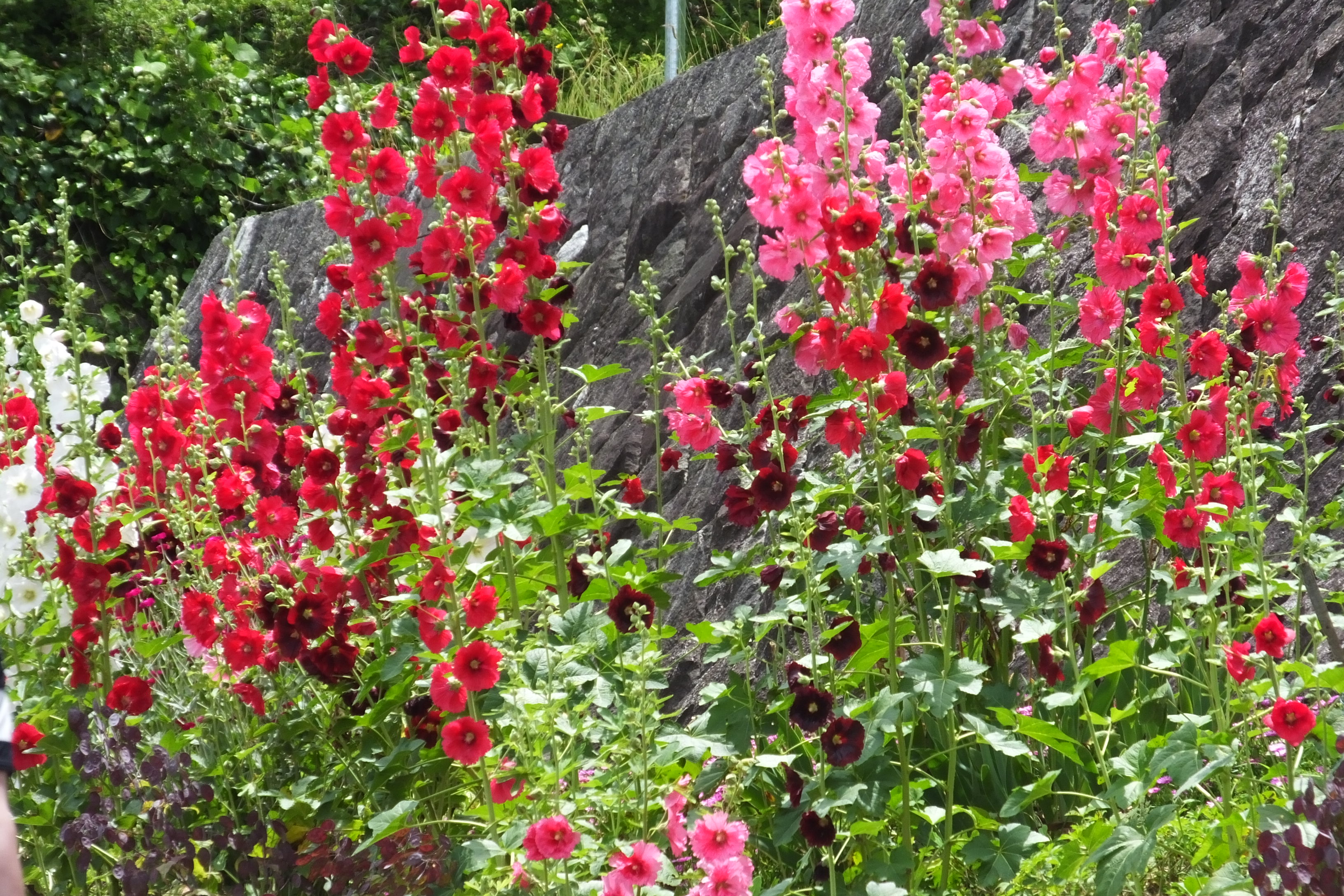
In Japan

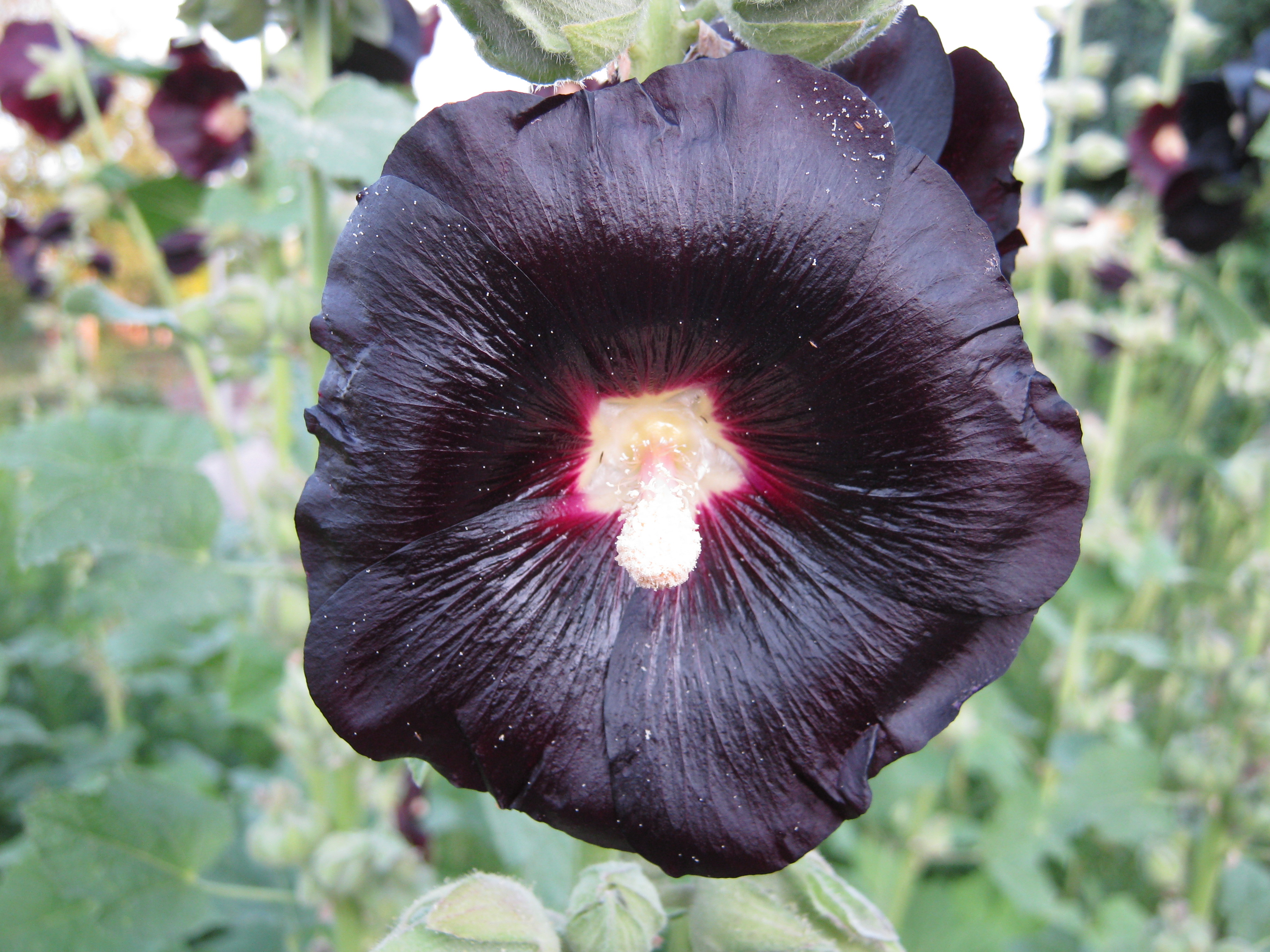
Black cultivar 'Nigra'

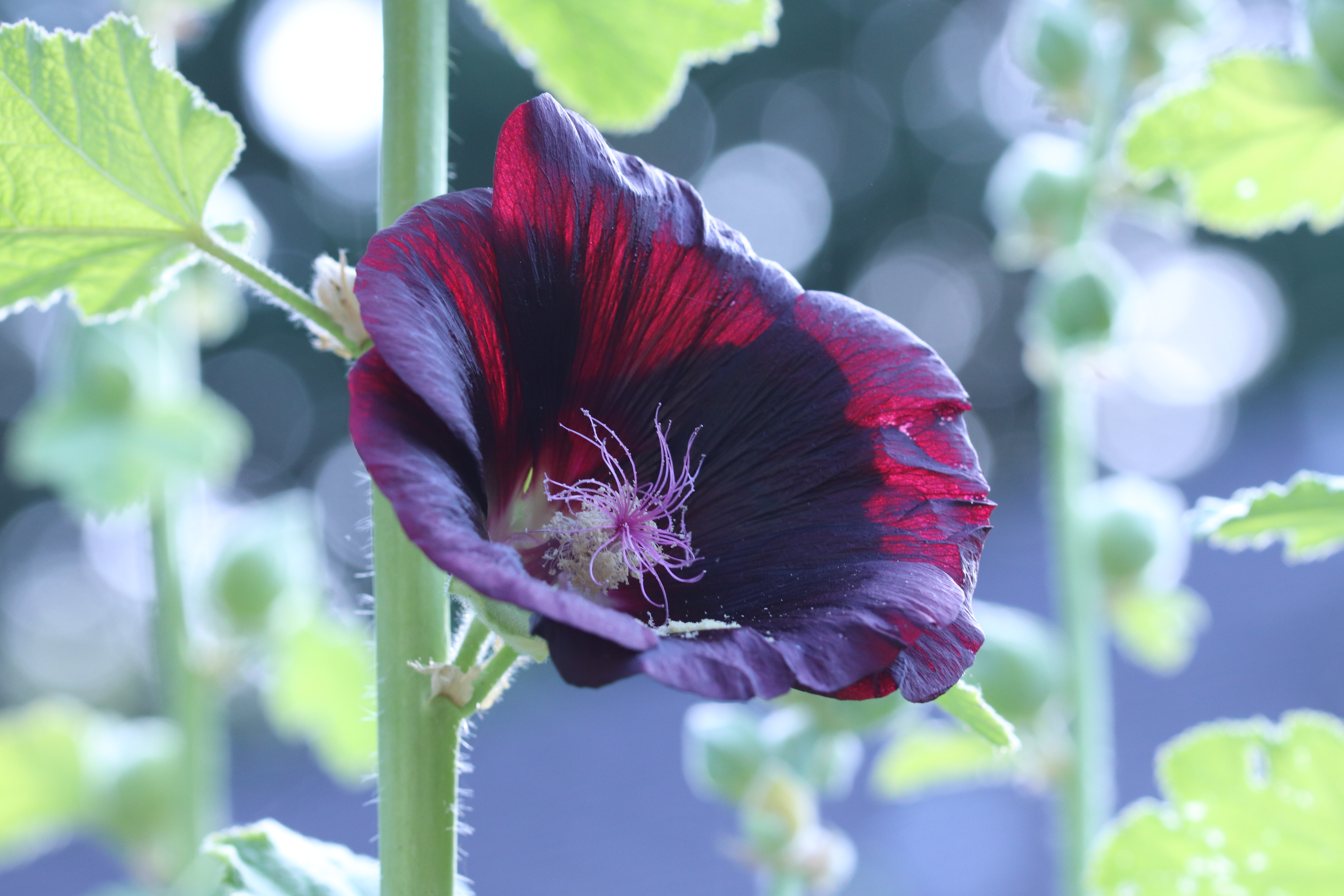
'Blacknight'

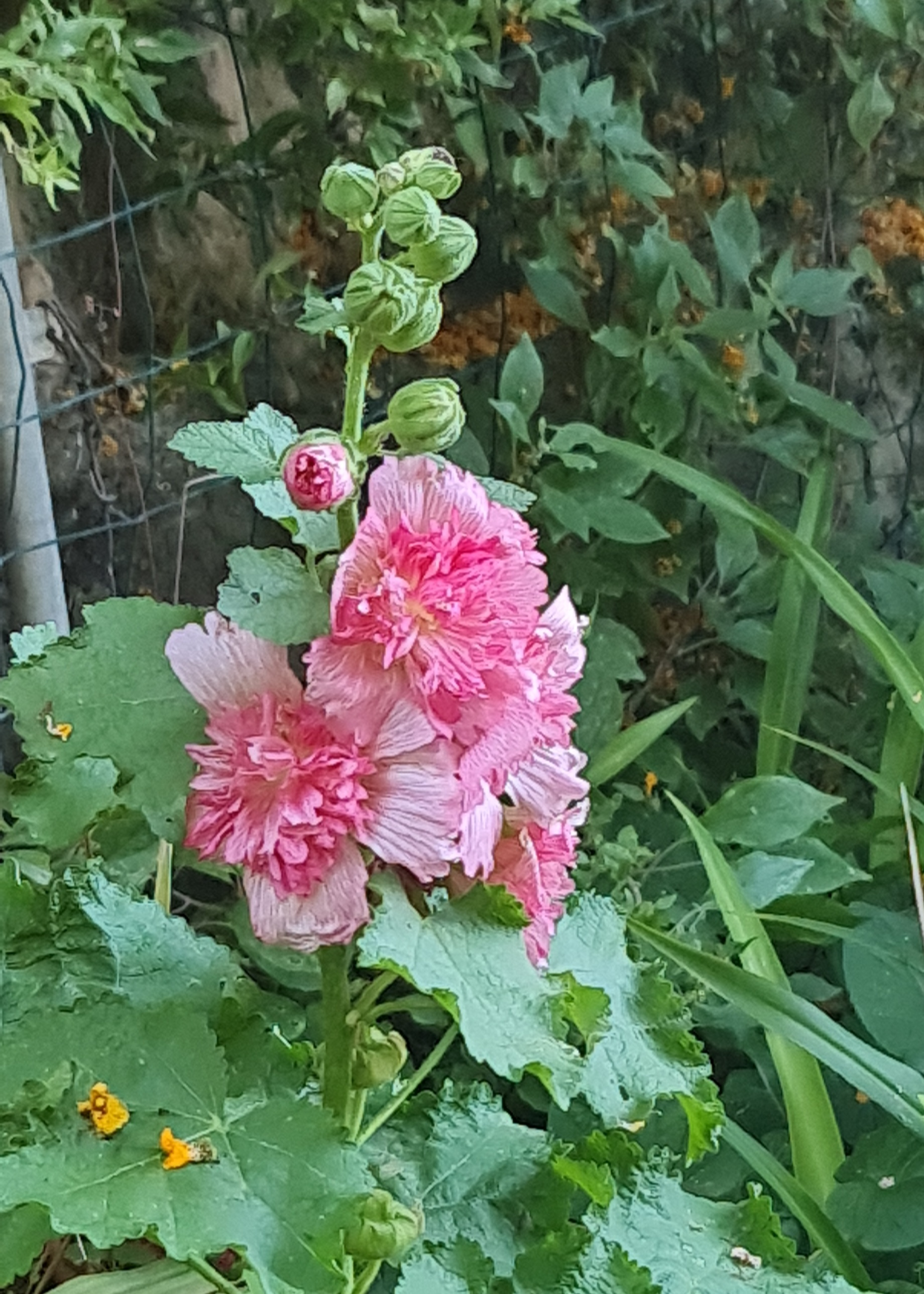
In Palestine

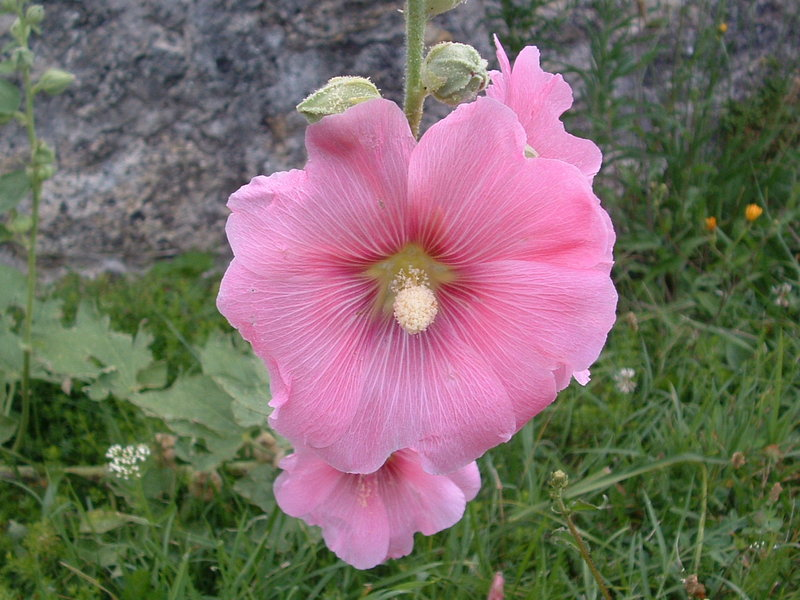

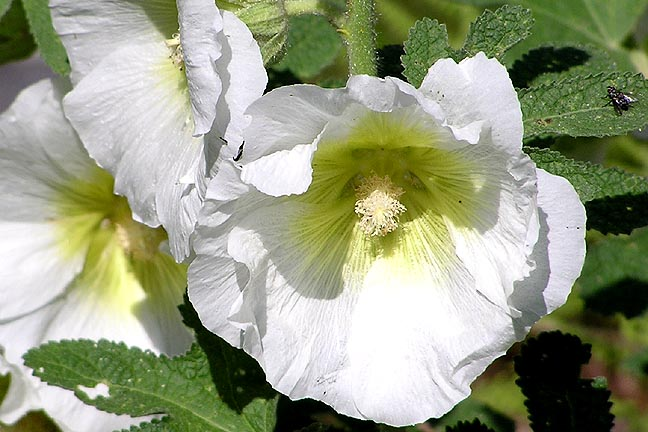

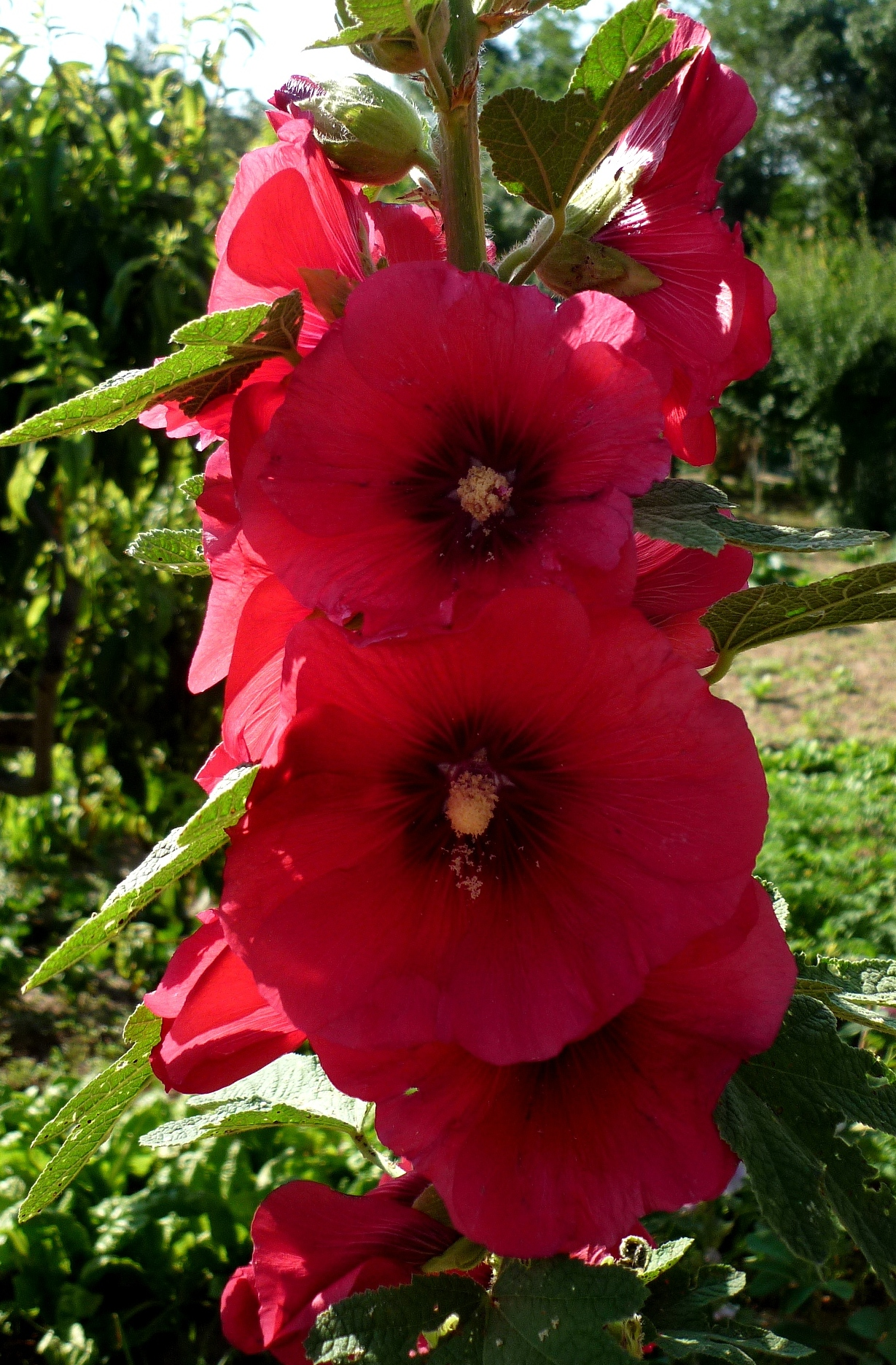

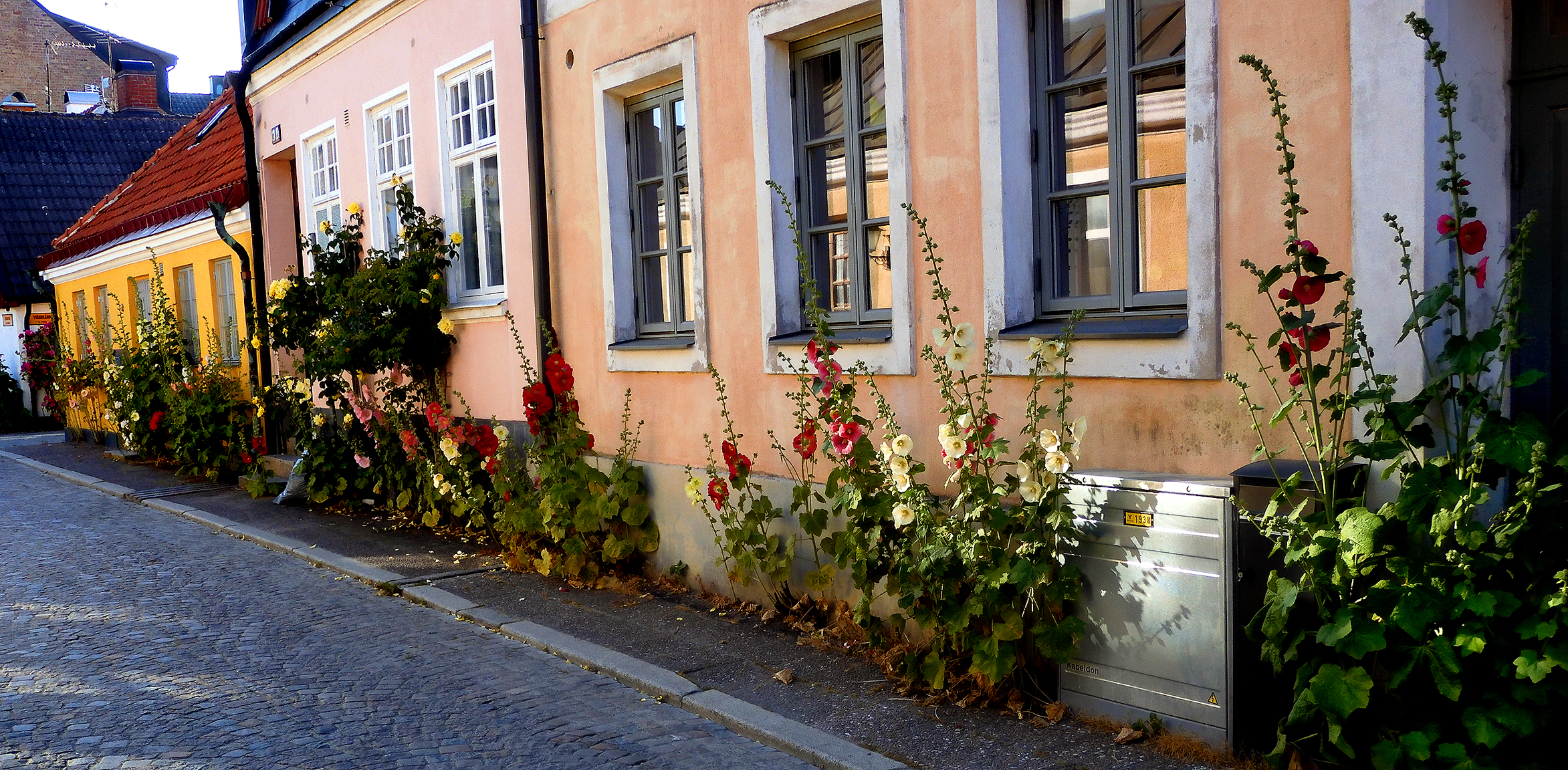
In Sweden.

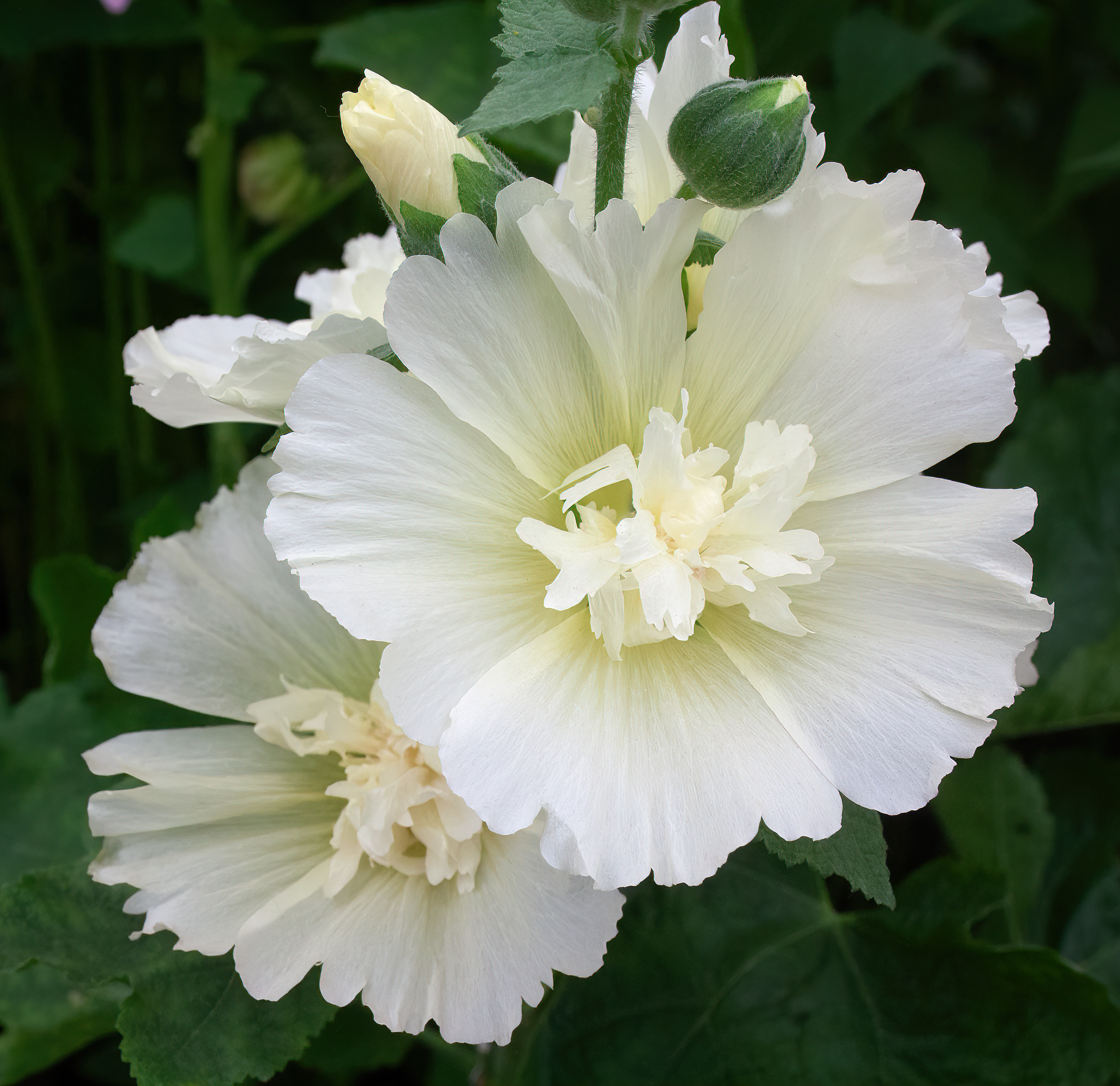
A. rosea 'spring celebrities white'
