= Bucculatrix quadrigemina =

Scientific classification
- Kingdom: Animalia
- Phylum: Arthropoda
- Clade: Pancrustacea
- Class: Insecta
- Order: Lepidoptera
- Family: Bucculatricidae
- Genus: Bucculatrix
- Species: B. quadrigemina

Binomial name
- Bucculatrix quadrigemina Braun, 1918

Synonyms
- Bucculatrix althaeae Busck, 1919

Species of moth

Bucculatrix quadrigemina is a moth in the family Bucculatricidae. It was described in 1918 by Annette Frances Braun and is found in North America, where it has been recorded from California.

Adults have been recorded on wing from January to June and in October.

The larvae feed on Althaea rosea. They mine the leaves of their host plant. The mine is very long and linear. Older larvae live freely, causing many holes in the leaf. Pupation takes place in a white cocoon.
