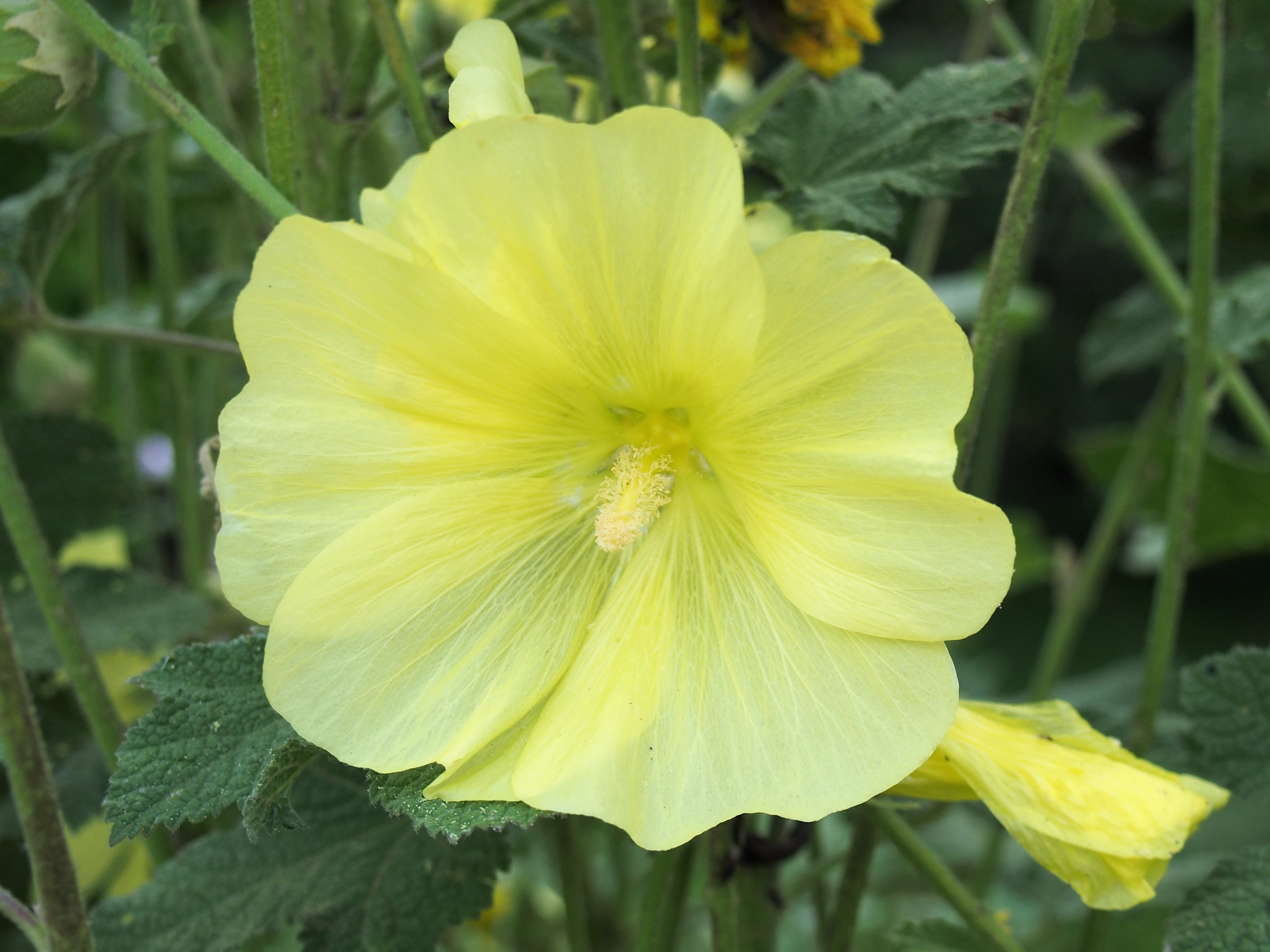
- Close-up of flower
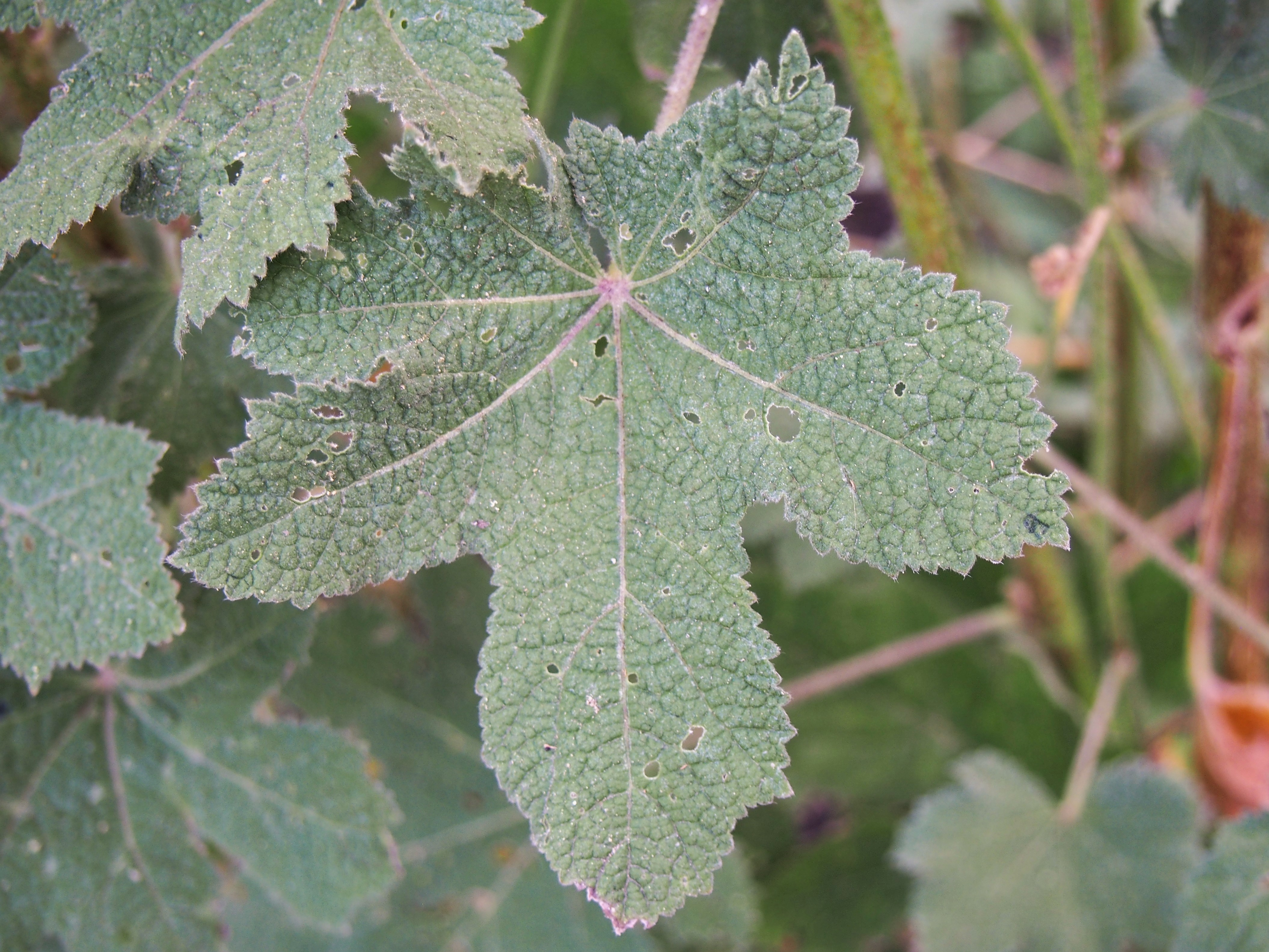
- Alcea rugosa has rugose, fig-leaf shaped leaves

Scientific classification
- Kingdom: Plantae
- Clade: Embryophytes
- Clade: Tracheophytes
- Clade: Angiosperms
- Clade: Eudicots
- Clade: Rosids
- Order: Malvales
- Family: Malvaceae
- Genus: Alcea
- Species: A. rugosa

Binomial name
- Alcea rugosa Alef.

Synonyms
- Alcea novopokrovskyi Iljin; Alcea taurica Iljin

= Alcea rugosa =

Species of flowering plant

Alcea rugosa, the Russian hollyhock, is a species of flowering plant in the family Malvaceae. It is native to Ukraine, Crimea, south European Russia, and the Caucasus, and has been introduced as a garden escapee into Wisconsin and Maryland in the United States. It is resistant to Puccinia malvacearum rust, and hardy to USDA zone 4.
