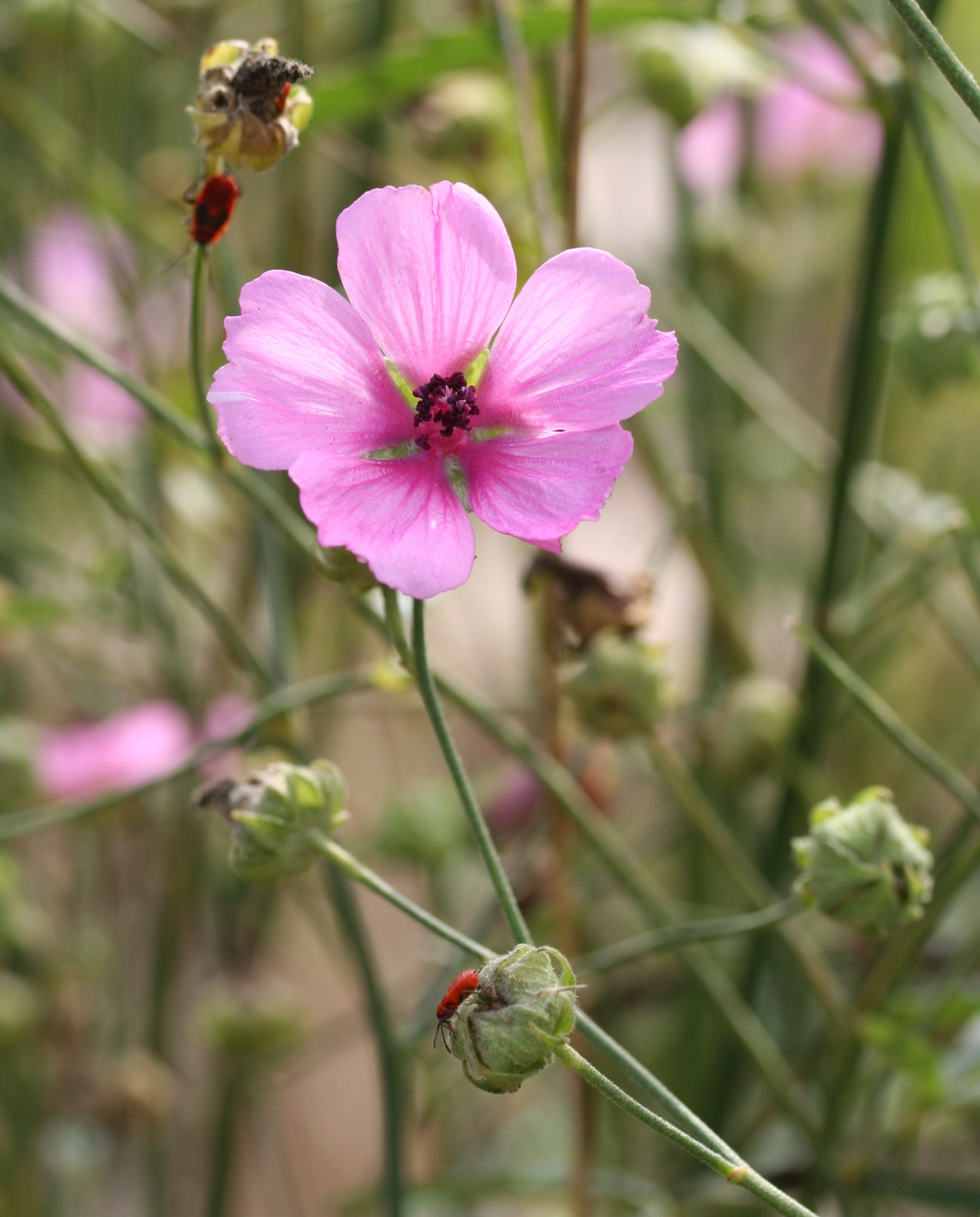

Scientific classification
- Kingdom: Plantae
- Clade: Tracheophytes
- Clade: Angiosperms
- Clade: Eudicots
- Clade: Rosids
- Order: Malvales
- Family: Malvaceae
- Genus: Althaea
- Species: A. cannabina

Binomial name
- Althaea cannabina L.

Synonyms
- Althaea kotschyi Boiss.; Althaea narbonensis Pourr. ex Cav.

= Althaea cannabina =

Species of flowering plant

Althaea cannabina, commonly called palm-leaf marshmallow or hemp-leaved hollyhock, is a perennial herb belonging to the genus Althaea of the family Malvaceae. The leaves resemble those of hemp (Cannabis sativa), hence the specific epithet cannabina ("hemp-like").

== Description ==
Althaea cannabina reaches on average 40–200 centimetres (16–79 in) of height. The stem is erect, cylindrical, pubescent and very branched. Lower leaves are petiolate, hairy and almost completely subdivided in three-five segments, linear or linear-lanceolate, toothed or lobed, up to 2 centimetres (0.79 in) wide and 8 centimetres (3.1 in) long. The upper leaves are simply lobed and toothed. The flowers are solitary or in clusters and grow in the axils of the leaves, on long pedicels up to 10 centimetres (3.9 in) or on long peduncles up to 20 centimetres (7.9 in). They are usually pink or reddish-purple and heart-shaped, 8–10 millimetres (0.31–0.39 in) wide and 13–15 millimetres (0.51–0.59 in) long, with purple-red stamens. The flowering period extends from July through September.

== Distribution ==
Althaea cannabina grows wild in central and southern Europe and in the Mediterranean Basin, from Portugal, north Africa and east to Turkey - except Balearic Islands, Corsica, Crete and Chipre - up to central Asia.

== Habitat ==
These plants grow at an altitude of 0–800 metres (0–2,625 ft) above sea level. They prefer coastal thickets, forest edges, meadows, weedy places, roads, wasteland, pastures and parks, especially with rocky and calcareous soils.

== Botanical gallery ==
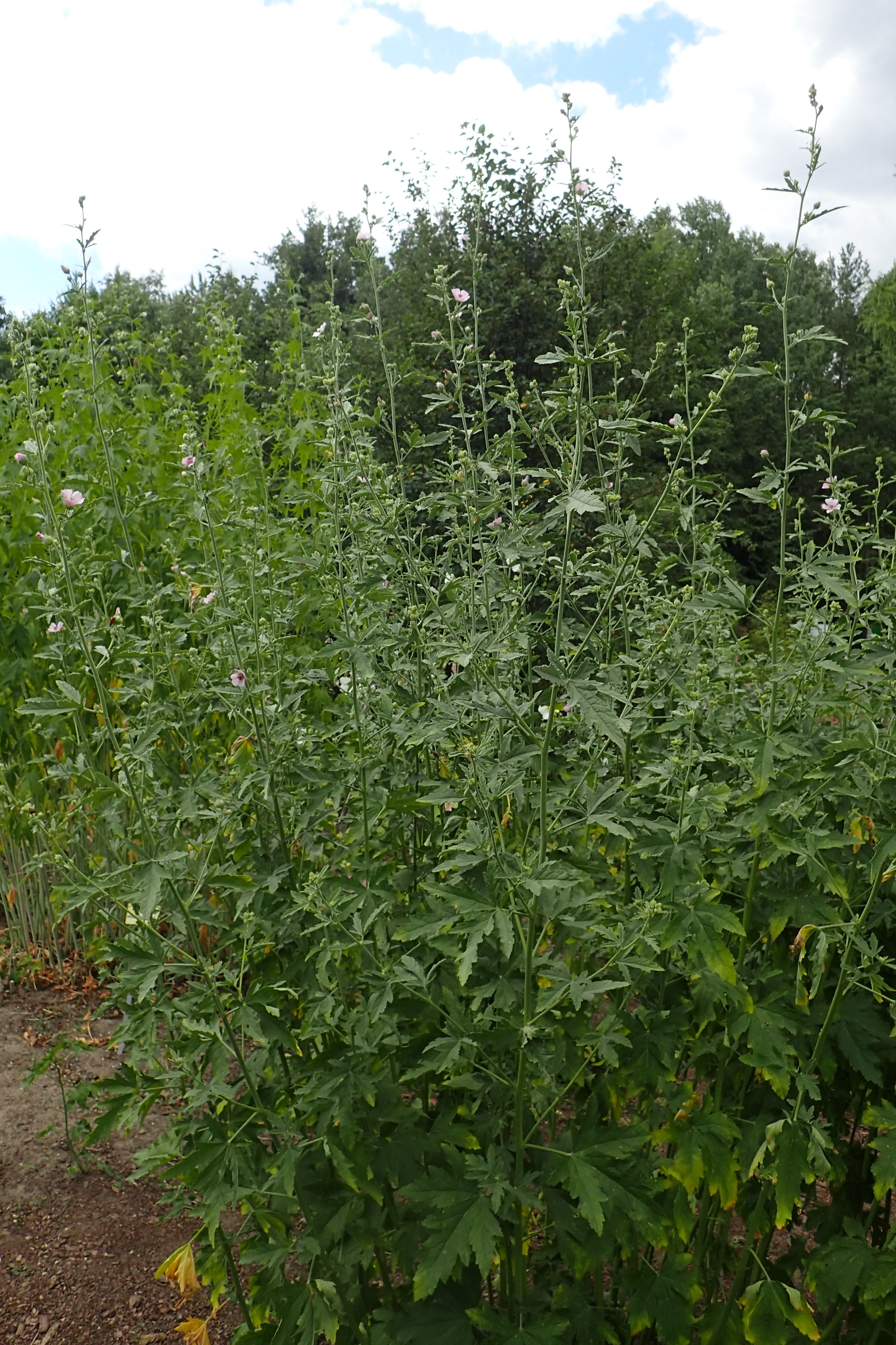
Plant form, generally tall (Poland)

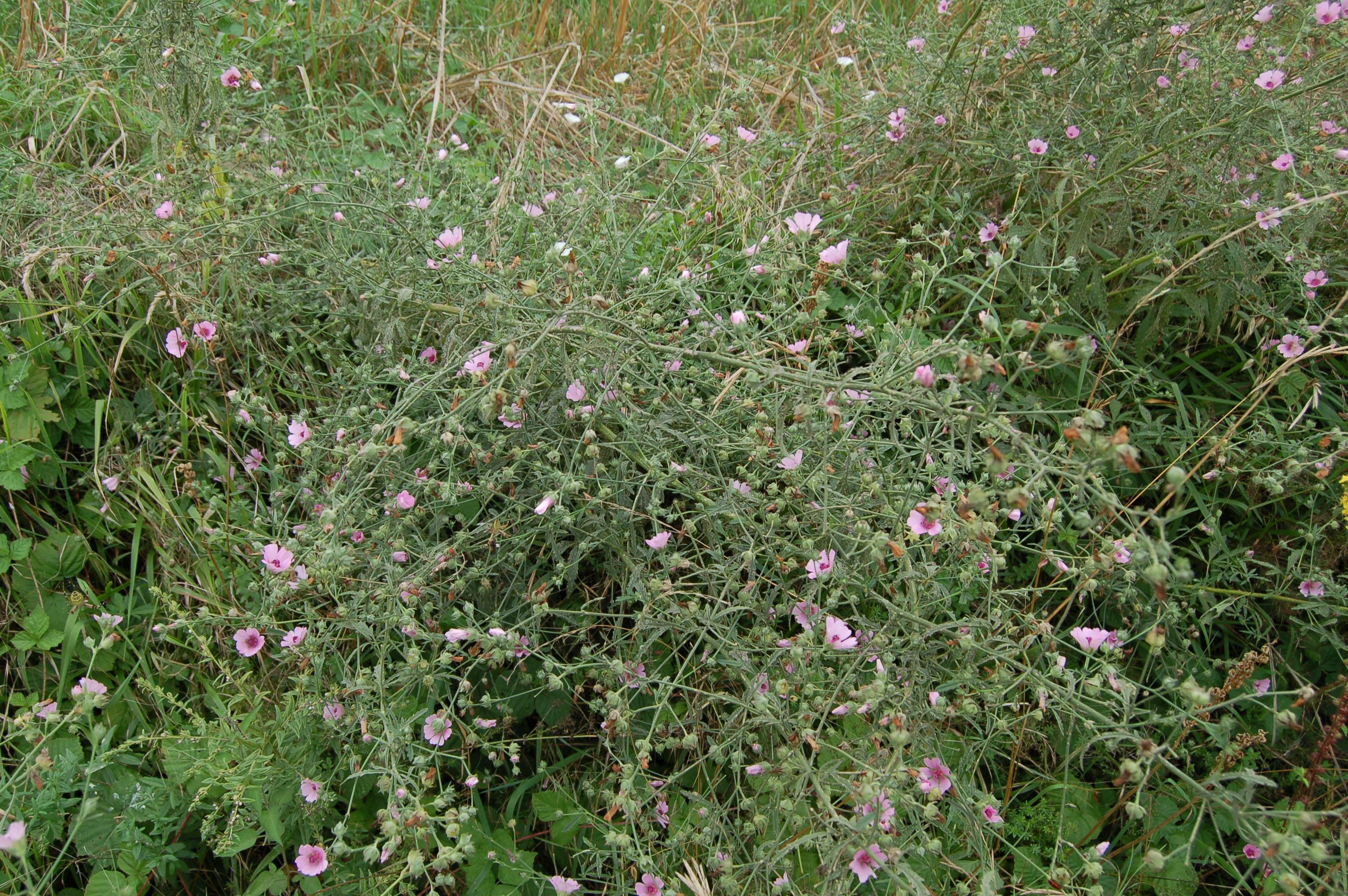
Plant form, tall (France)

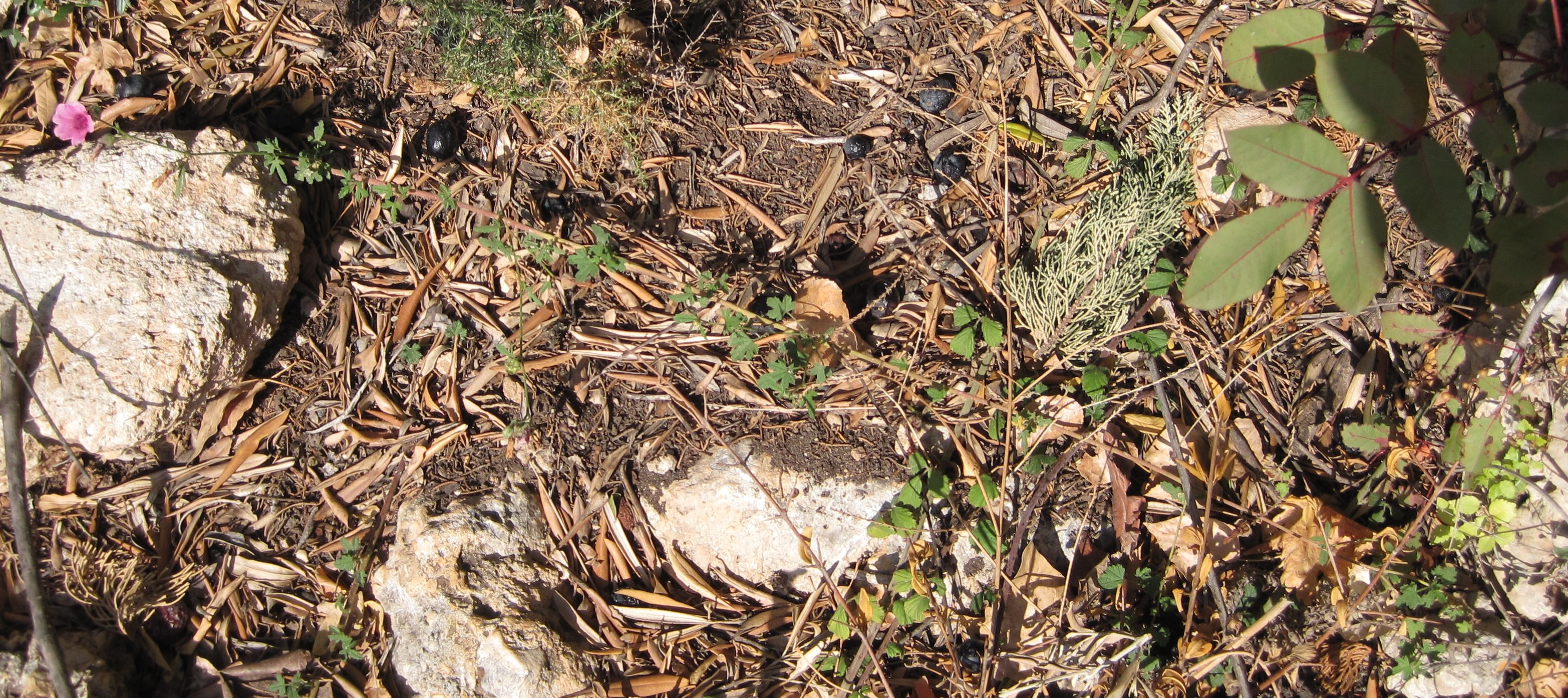
Plant, shaded, less lush (Antalya)

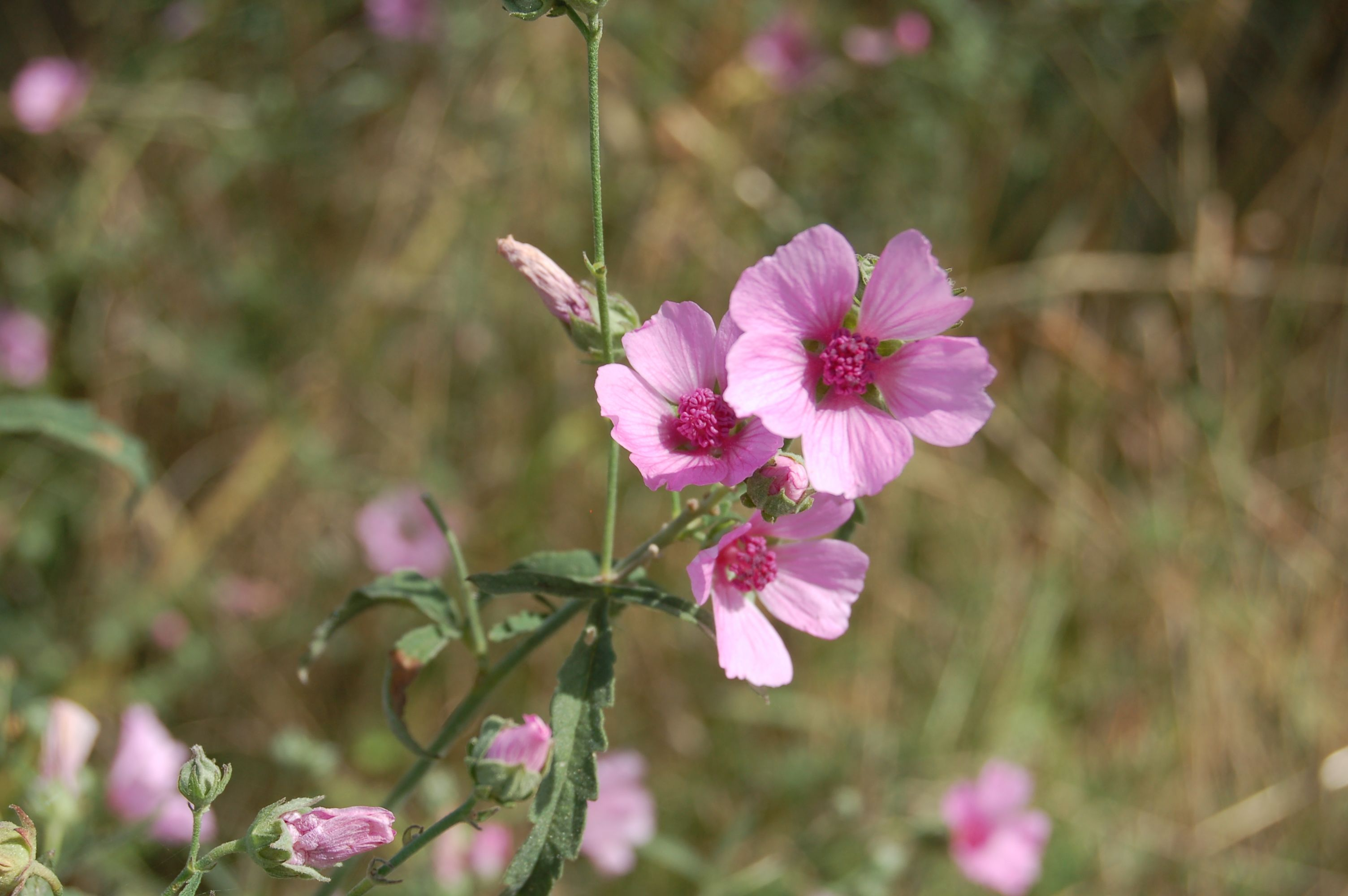
Flowers (anthers unopened), with upper leaves (France)

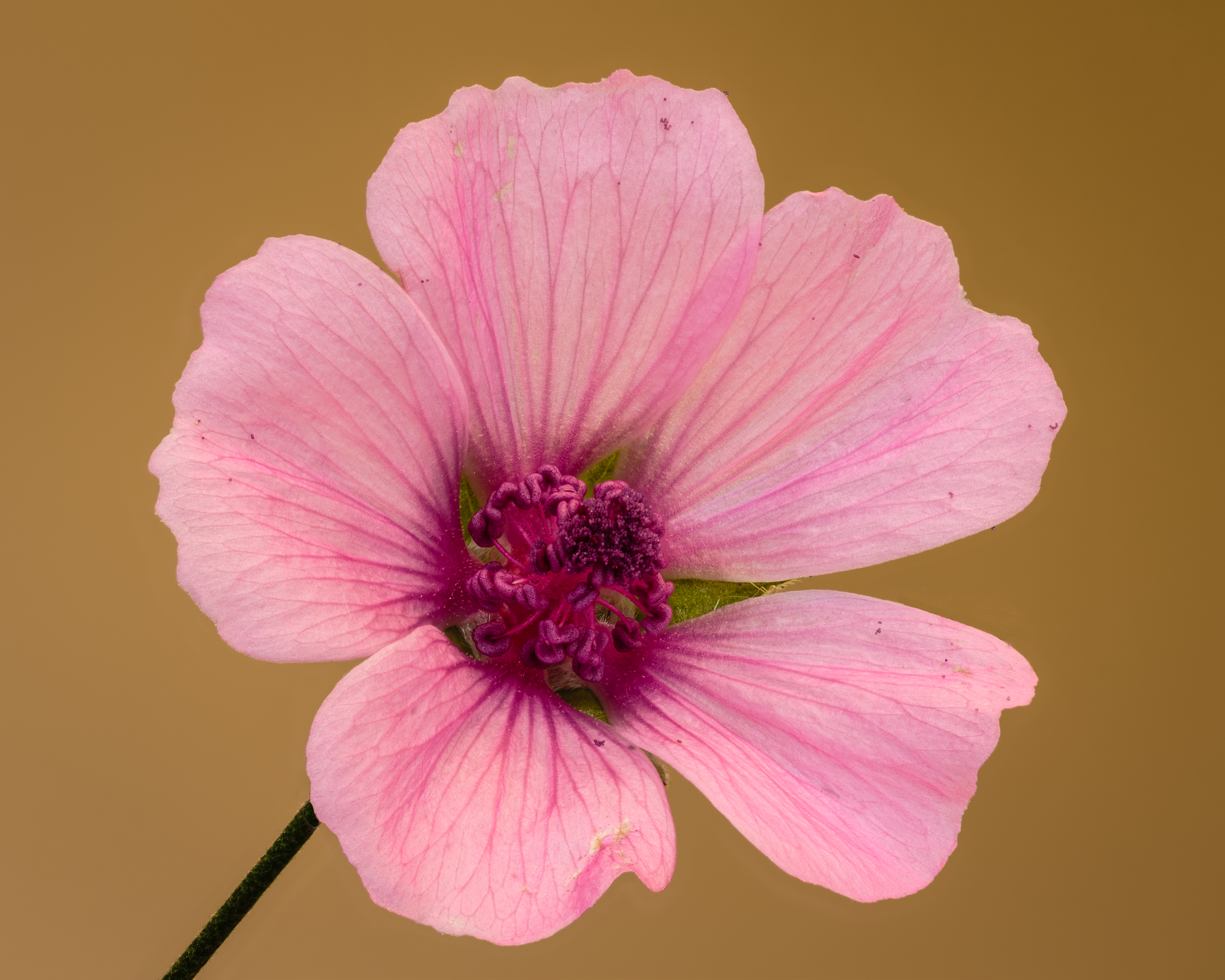
Flower, anthers opened and unopened, petals may overlap more (Netherlands)

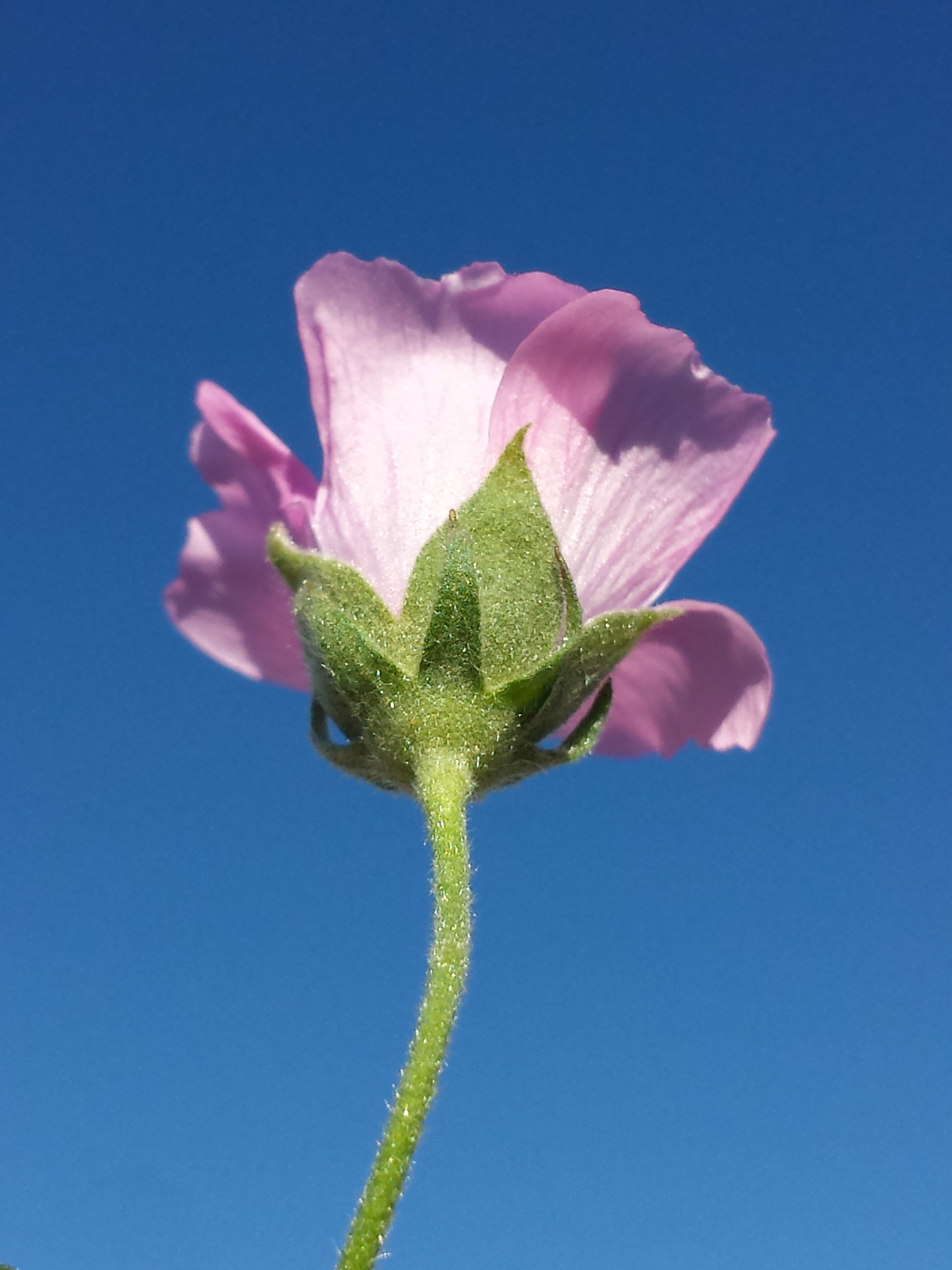
Flower underside, with many-part epicalyx outside the calyx base, hairs stellate (Bosnia and Herzegovina)

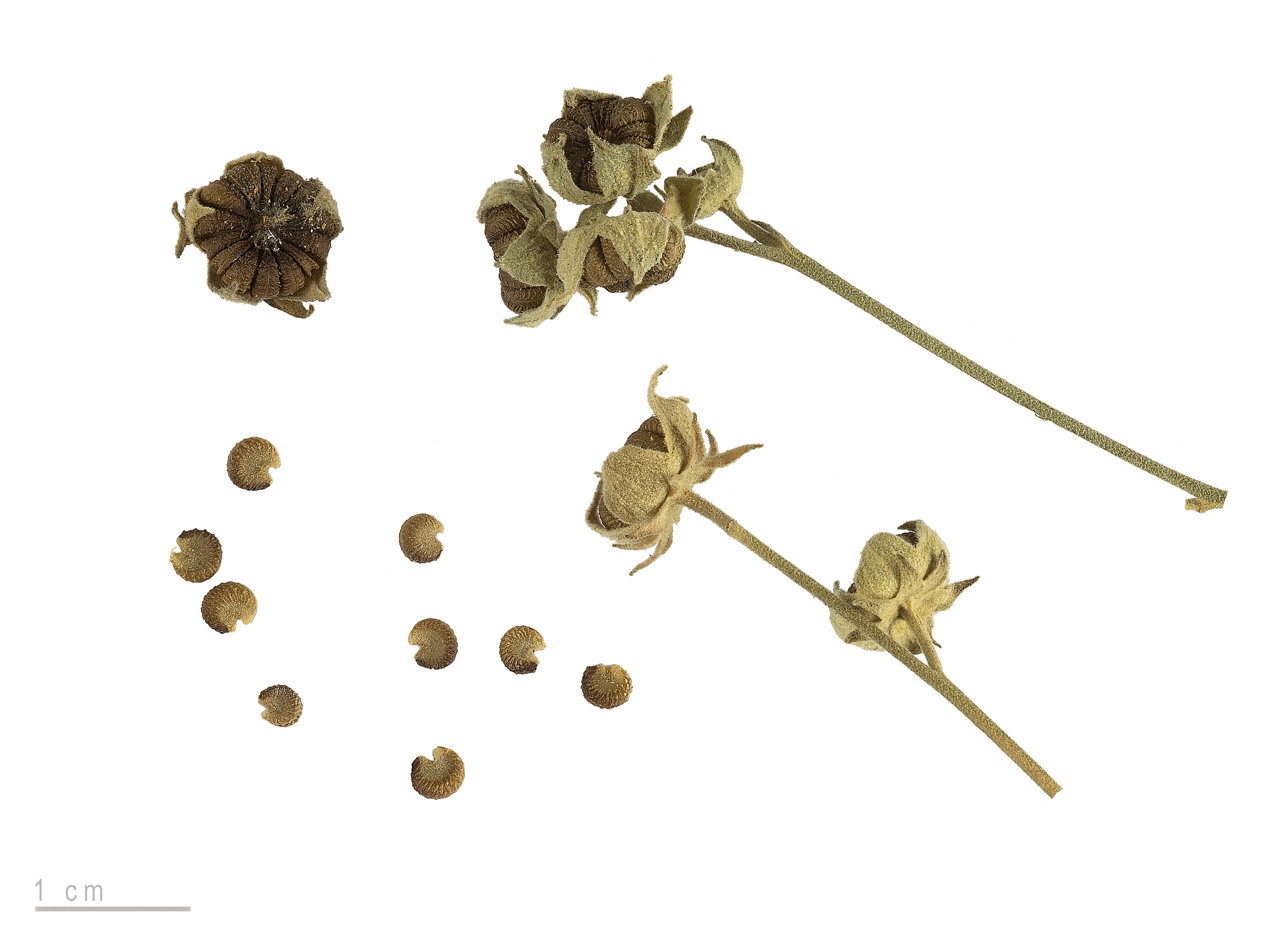
Fruits, hairless and rugose (France)

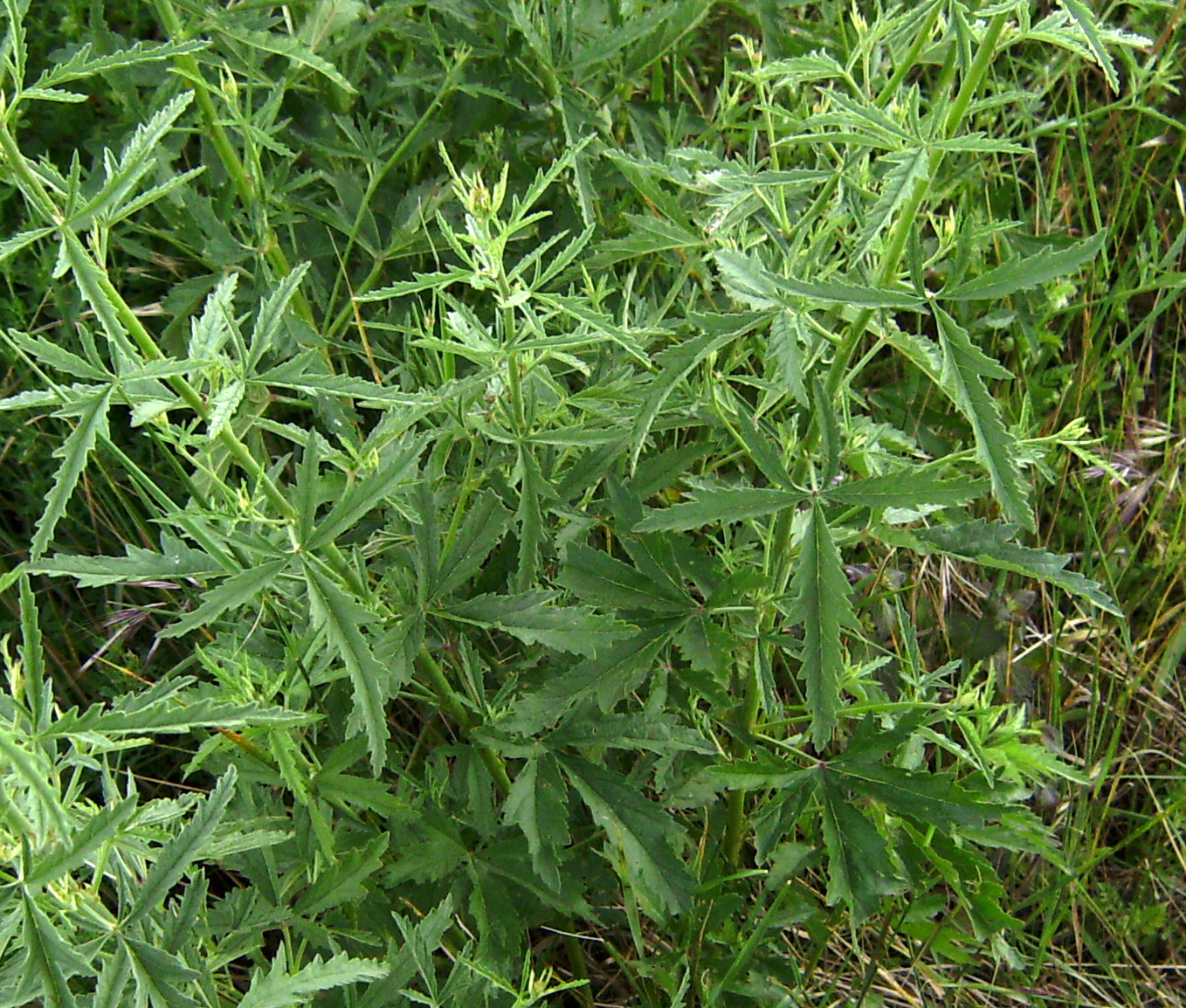
Leaves, lush (Catalonia)

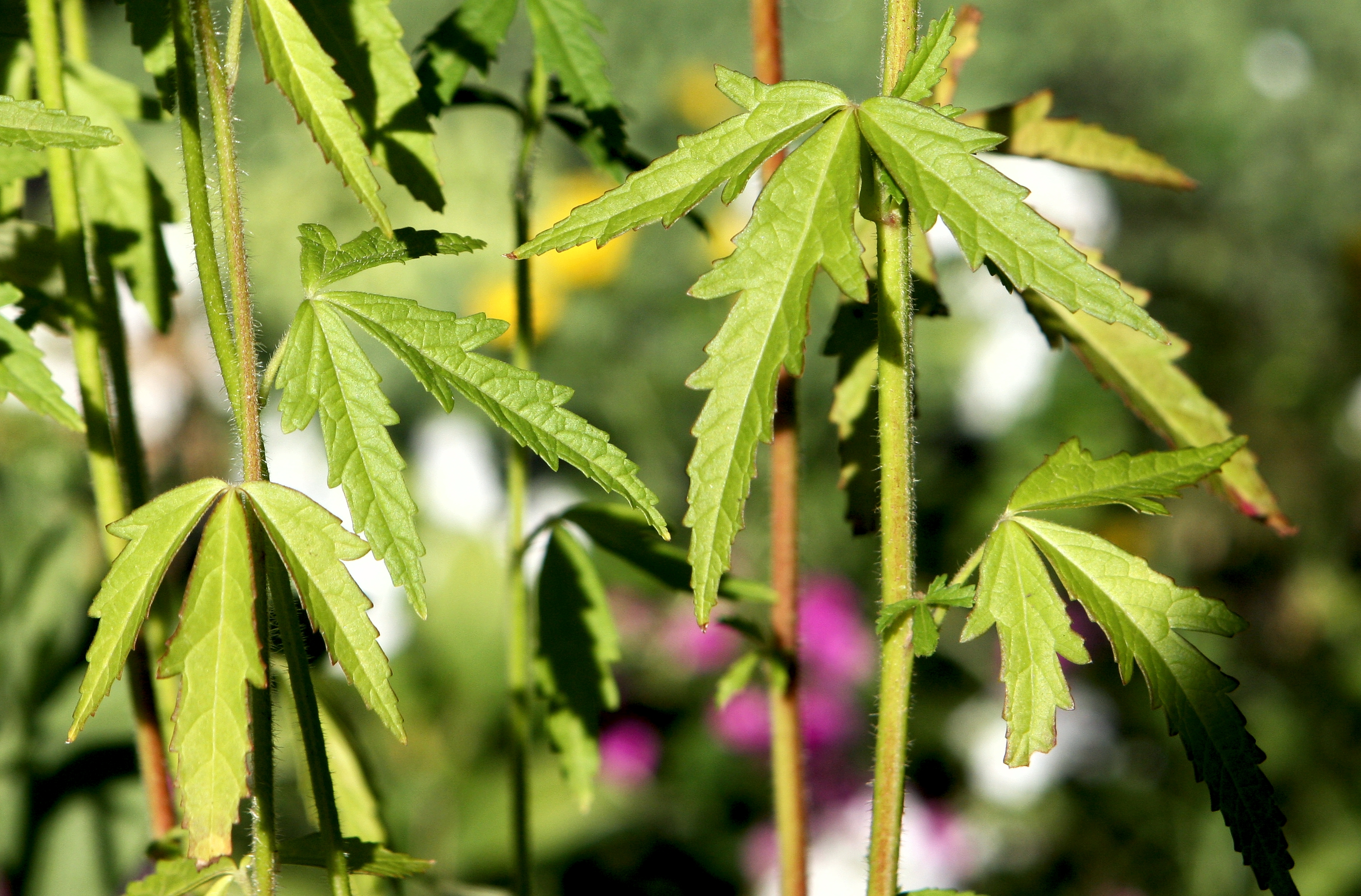
Leaves

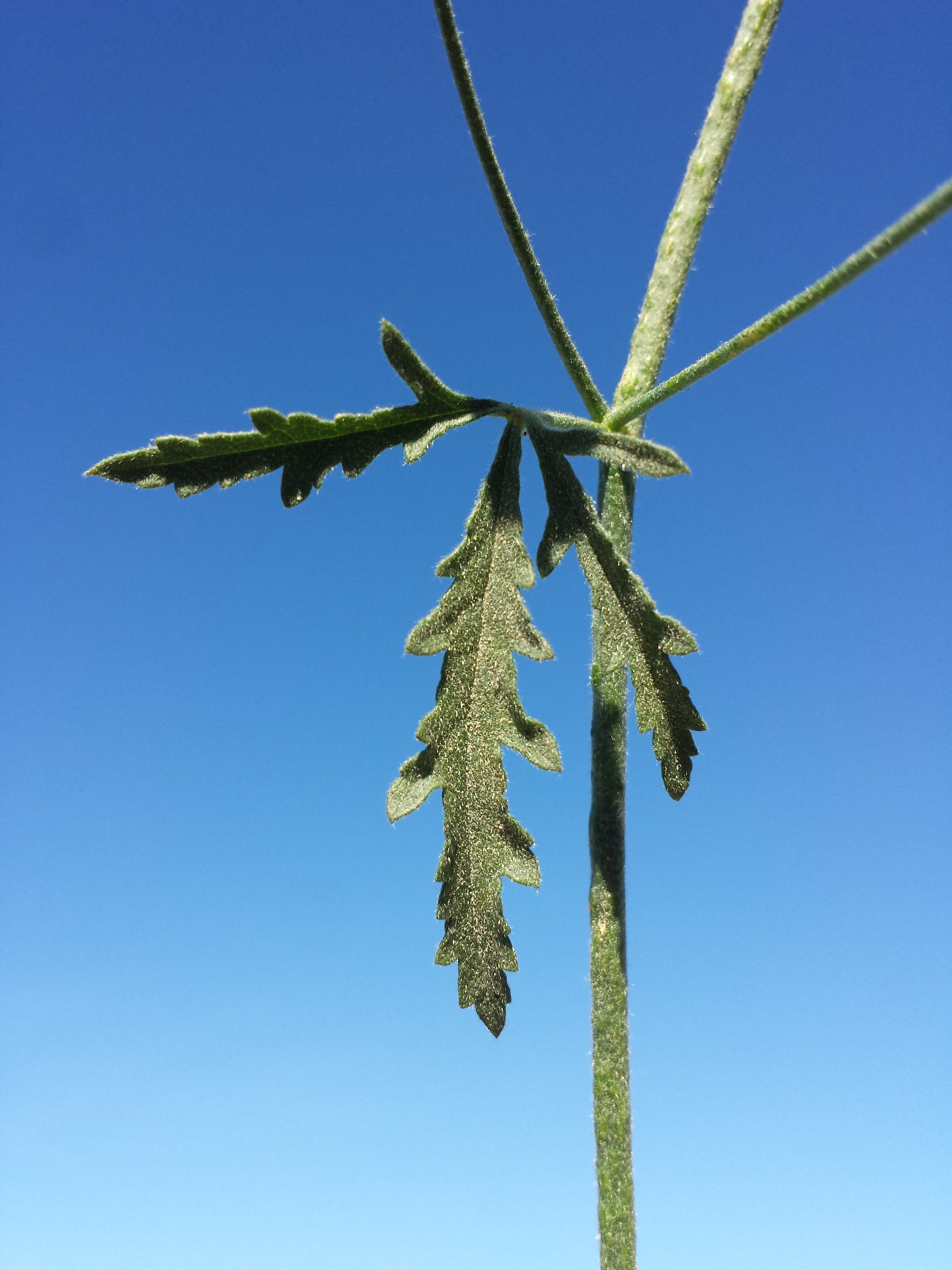
Leaf, hairs stellate (Slovenia)

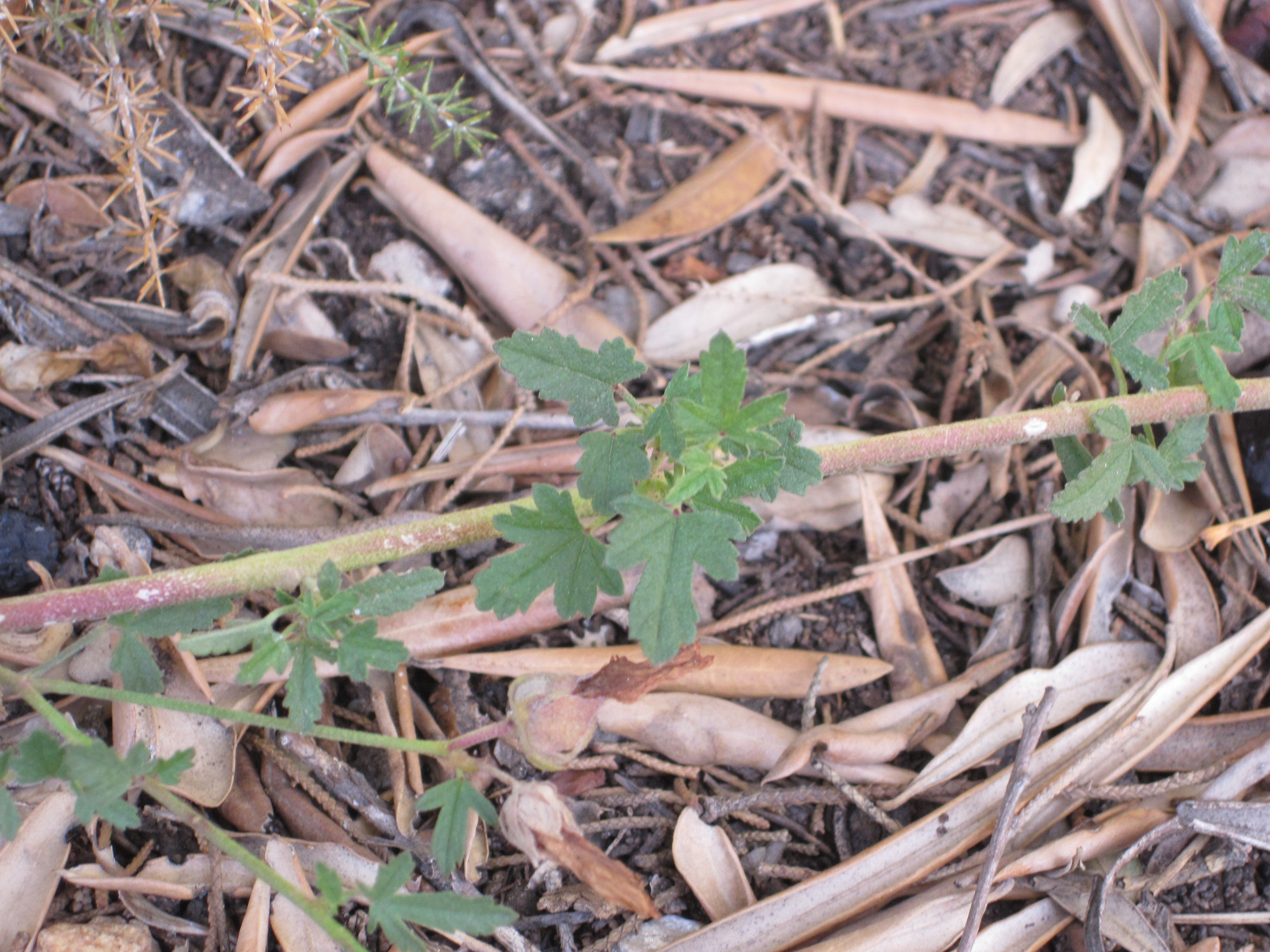
Stem leaves, less lush form (Antalya)

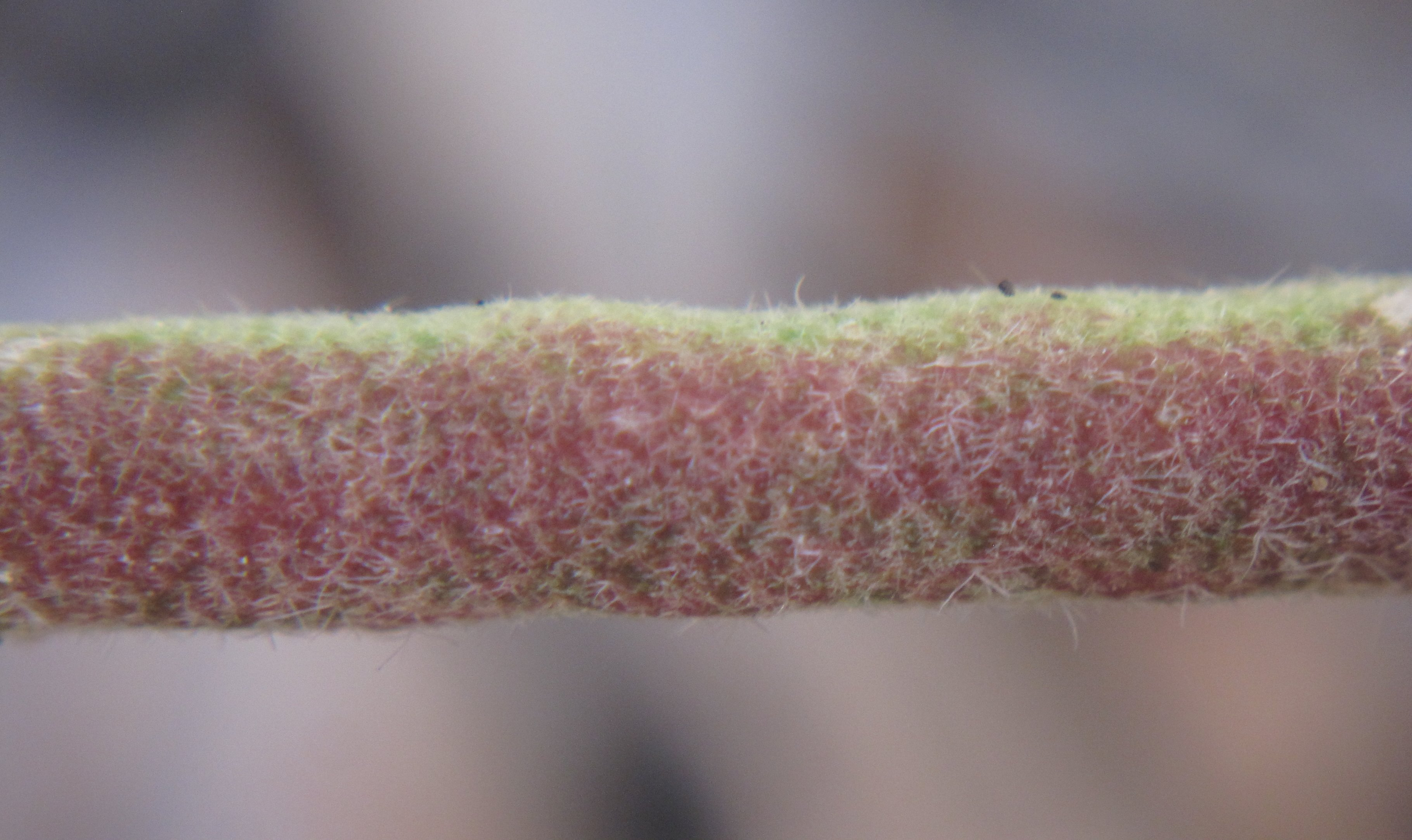
Stem, with stellate hairs (Antalya)
