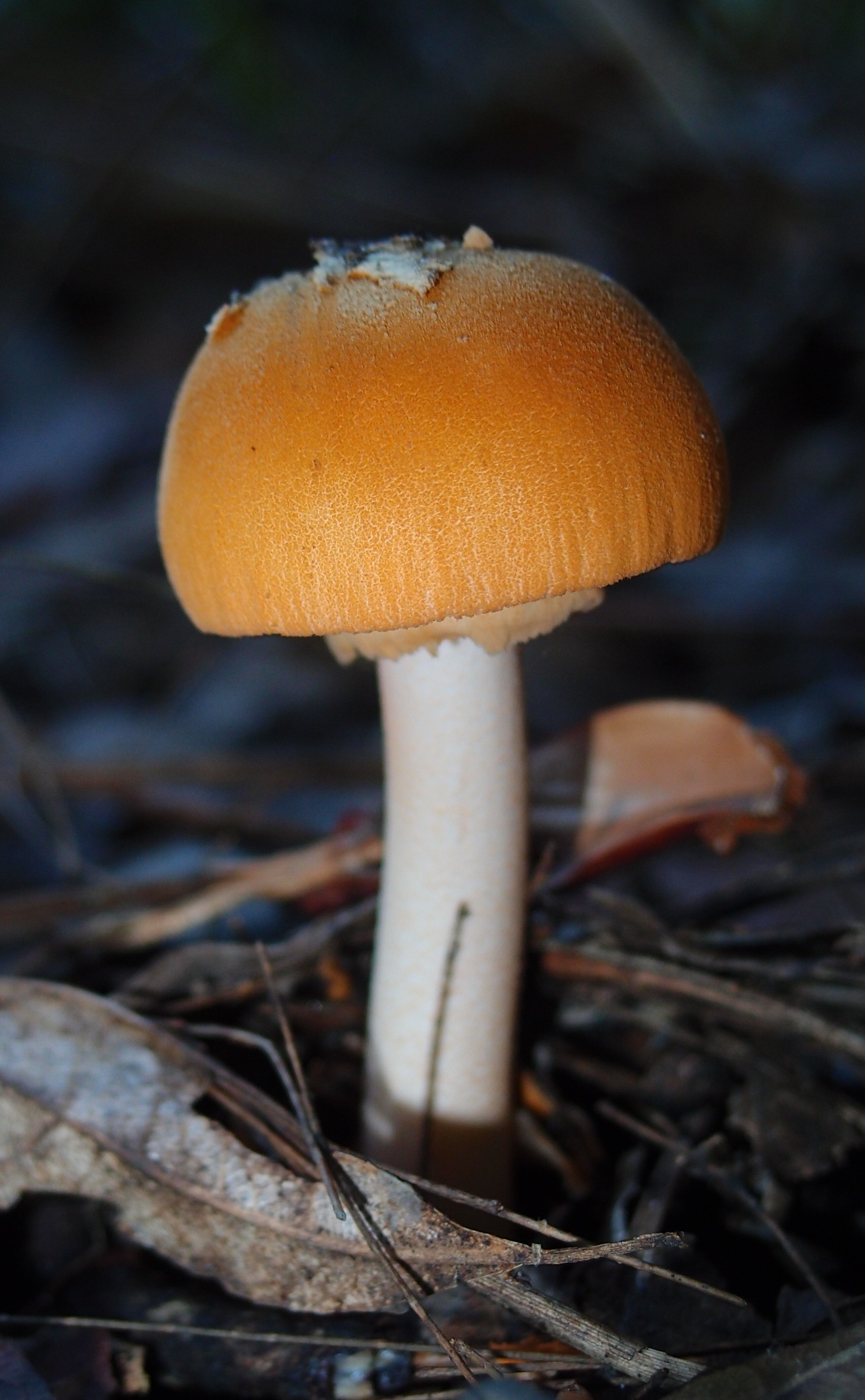

Scientific classification
- Kingdom: Fungi
- Division: Basidiomycota
- Class: Agaricomycetes
- Order: Agaricales
- Family: Amanitaceae
- Genus: Amanita
- Species: A. armeniaca

Binomial name
- Amanita armeniaca A.E. Wood

= Amanita armeniaca =

Species of fungus

Amanita armeniaca
- Mycological characteristics
- Gills on hymenium
- Cap is convex or ovate
- Hymenium is free
- Stipe has a ring or has a ring and volva
- Spore print is white
- Ecology is mycorrhizal
- Edibility is unknown

Amanita armeniaca is a species of agaric fungus in the family Amanitaceae native to Australia.

== Description ==
=== Cap ===
Amanita ameniaca has a cap that is up to 90 mm wide; it is hemispheric at first, then it becomes convex before it becomes plane, smooth, and dry. It is orange and powdery. It has remnants of a universal veil; it has flat, dull scales near the center that eventually disappear.

=== Gills ===
Gills are free, thin, crowded, and white.

=== Stem ===
The stem is up to 130 mm long and 12 mm wide. The stem is firm with a small bulbous base. It is often pale orange. It has a ring, and the volva is usually absent or with a few irregular scales.
