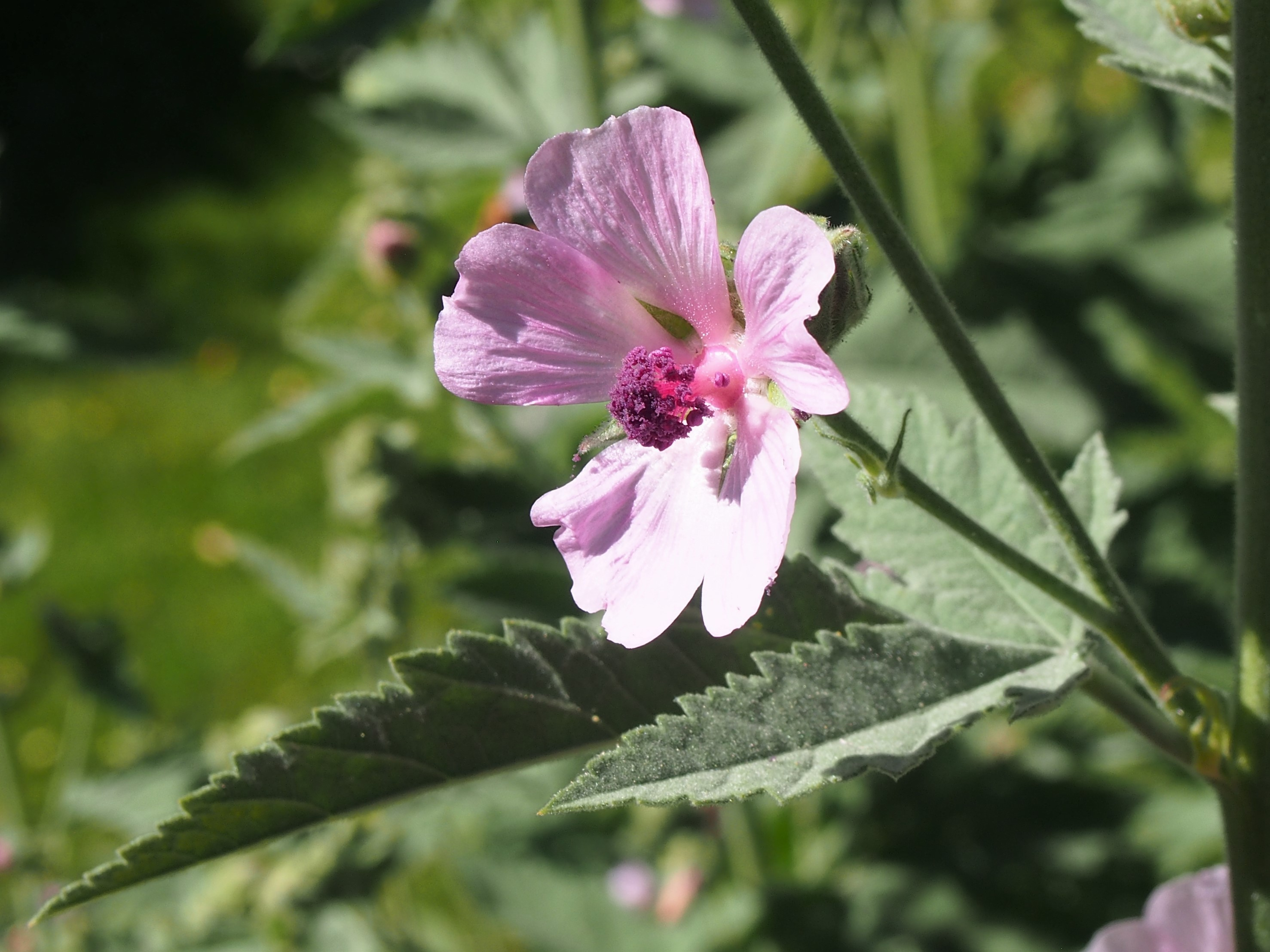

Scientific classification
- Kingdom: Plantae
- Clade: Tracheophytes
- Clade: Angiosperms
- Clade: Eudicots
- Clade: Rosids
- Order: Malvales
- Family: Malvaceae
- Genus: Althaea
- Species: A. armeniaca

Binomial name
- Althaea armeniaca Ten.

Synonyms
- Althaea broussonetiifolia Iljin; Althaea hyrcana Grossh.

= Althaea armeniaca =

Species of flowering plant

Althaea armeniaca is a flowering plant in the family Malvaceae, native to southern Russia, Central Asia, Turkey, northern Iran, the Transcaucasus, Lebanon and Syria. In its native range its grows in dry continental climates.

== Description ==
A. armeniaca is a tall, perennial herb with villous stems. The leaves are deeply divided into three ovate-lanceolate lobes, the central lobe being longer than the others. The leaf margin is serrated. The leaf surface has a villous indumentum of stellate hairs. The flowers are borne on multi-flowered peduncles. The red petals are about 15 mm long. The mericarps have a rough surface and a pilose indumentum of stellate hairs.
