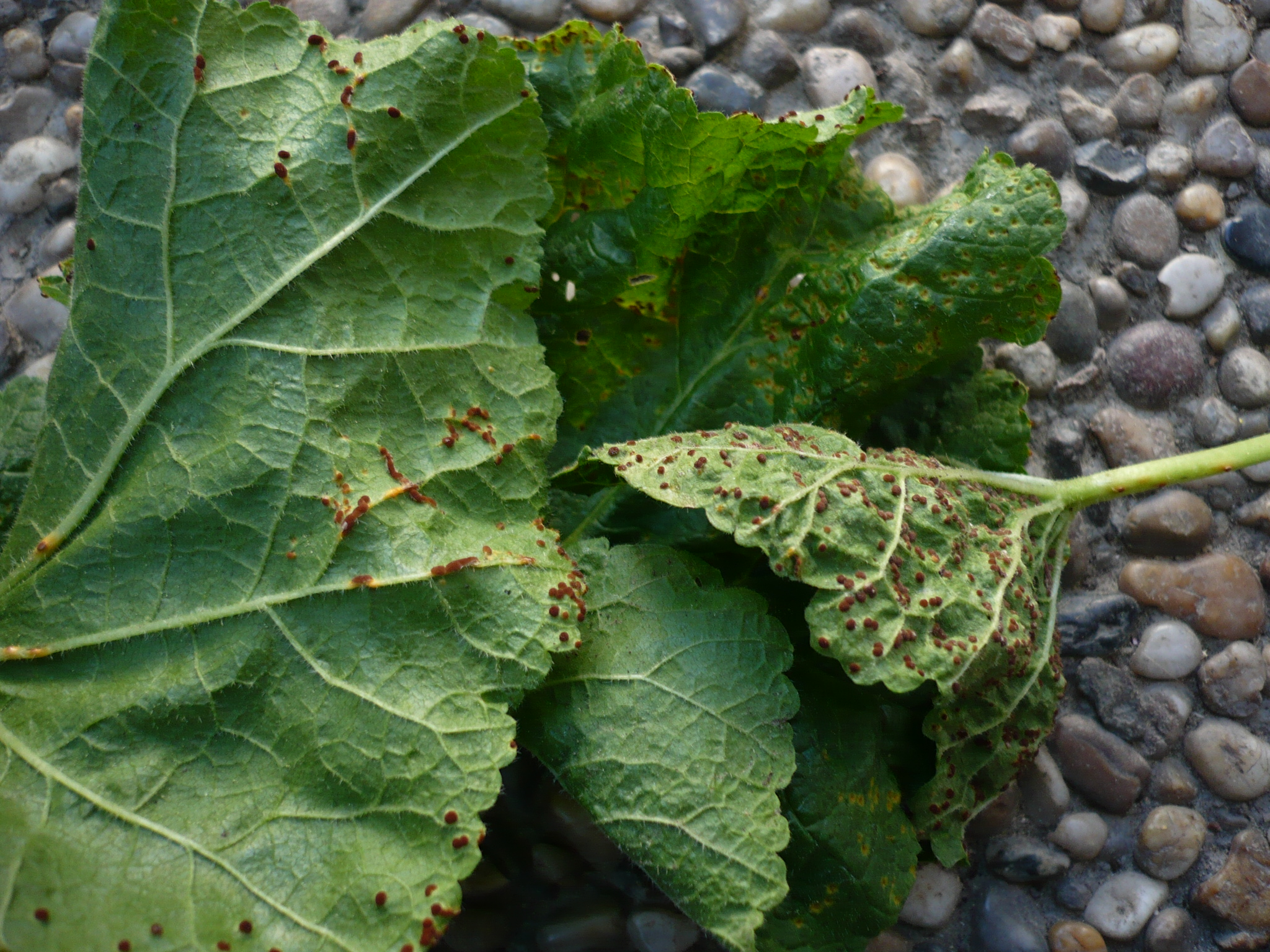

Scientific classification
- Kingdom: Fungi
- Division: Basidiomycota
- Class: Pucciniomycetes
- Order: Pucciniales
- Family: Pucciniaceae
- Genus: Puccinia
- Species: P. malvacearum

Binomial name
- Puccinia malvacearum Bertero ex Mont. (1852)

Synonyms
- Dasyspora malvacearum (Bertero ex Mont.) Arthur, Résult. Sci. Congr. Bot. Wien 1905: 346 (1906); Leptopuccinia malvacearum (Bertero ex Mont.) Rostr., Plantepatologi: 268 (1902); Micropuccinia malvacearum (Bertero ex Mont.) Arthur & H.S.Jacks., Bull. Torrey bot. Club 48: 41 (1921); Puccinia sidae-rhombifoliae Mayor, in Fuhrmann & Mayor, Mém. Soc. Sci. Nat. Neuchâtel 5: 484 (1914)

= Puccinia malvacearum =

Species of fungus

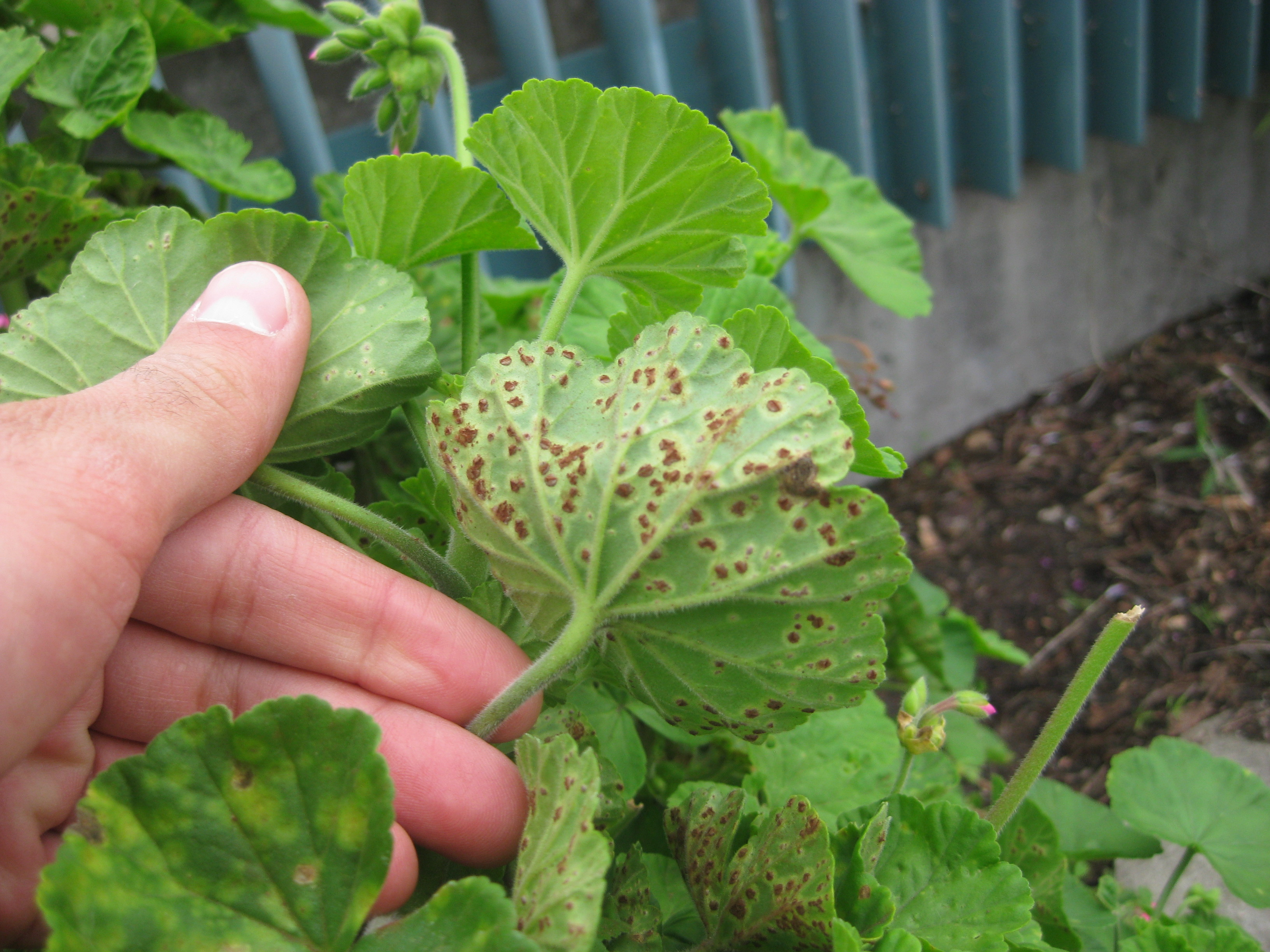
Puccinia malvacearum on Pelargonium geranium

Puccinia malvacearum, also known as hollyhock or mallow rust, is a fungal species within the genus Puccinia known for attacking members of the family Malvaceae. An autoecious pathogen, it can complete its life cycle using a single host.

It was originally found on the leaves of a species of Malva in Chile. Other plants also affected by the rust include Abutilon, Alcea (Hollyhock), Hibiscus, Lavatera, Malvastrum and Sphaeralcea.

Suggested control measures (in the US), include sanitation (removal or destruction of affected plants or plant portions) or treatment with fungicides.

== See also ==
- List of Puccinia species

== Other sources ==
- Hollyhock Rust: Puccinia malvacearum. University of Colorado Extension Service.
- Rust of Hollyhock. University of Nebraska–Lincoln Department of Plant Pathology.
