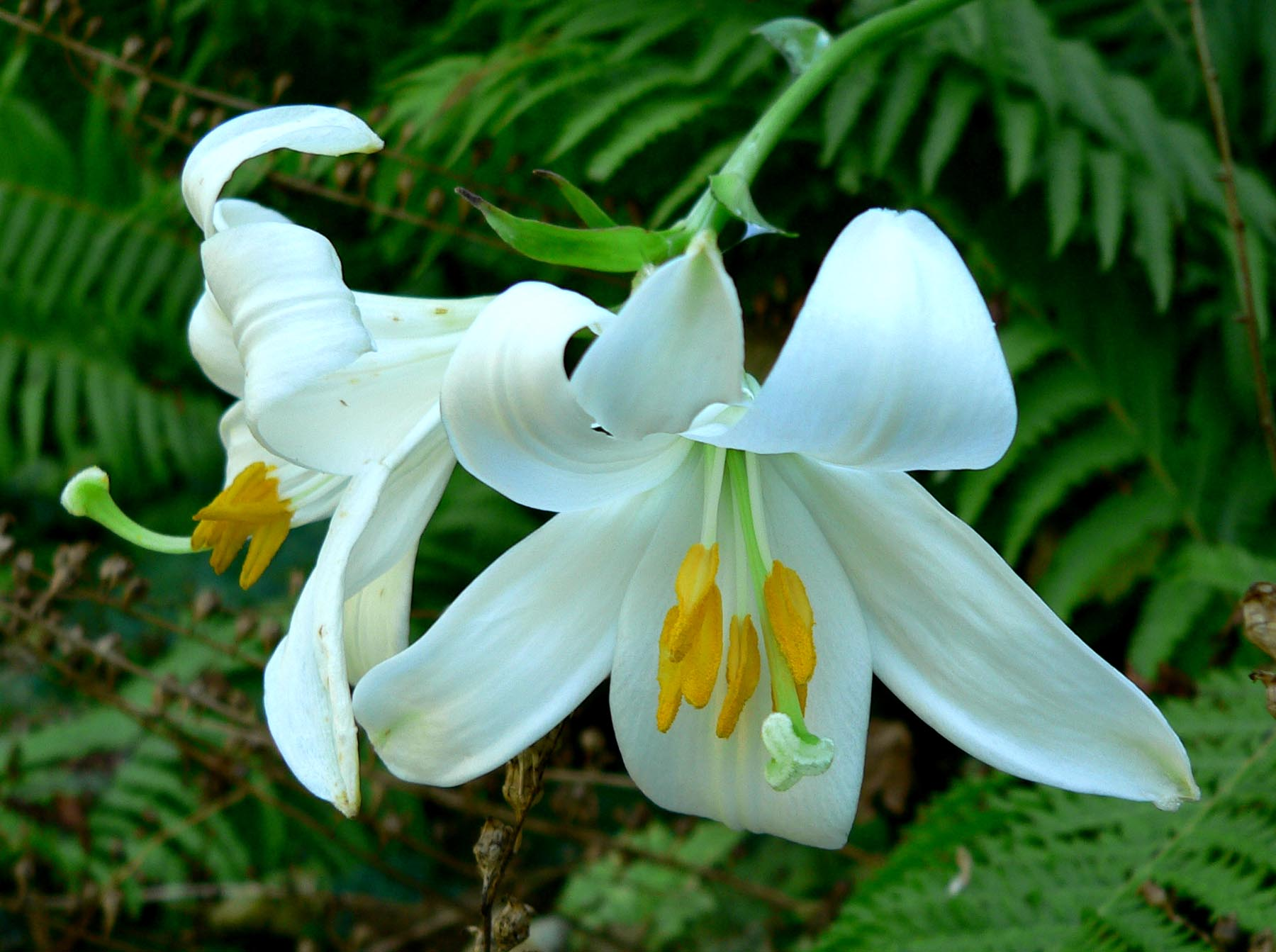
- Lilium candidum

Scientific classification
- Kingdom: Plantae
- Clade: Tracheophytes
- Clade: Angiosperms
- Clade: Monocots
- Order: Liliales
- Family: Liliaceae
- Subfamily: Lilioideae
- Tribe: Lilieae
- Genus: Lilium; L.

Type species
- Lilium candidum L.

Species
- List of Lilium species

Synonyms
- Lirium Scop., nom. illeg.; Martagon Wolf; Martagon (Rchb.) Opiz, nom. illeg.; Nomocharis Franch.

= Lilium =

Genus of plants

Lilium (/ˈlɪliəm/ LIL-ee-əm) is a genus of herbaceous flowering plants growing from bulbs, all with large and often prominent flowers. Lilies are a group of flowering plants which are important in culture and literature in much of the world. Most species are native to the Northern Hemisphere and their range is temperate climates and extends into the subtropics. Many other plants have "lily" in their common names, but do not belong to the same genus and are therefore not true lilies. True lilies are known to be highly toxic to cats.

Being monocots, lillies are distantly related to yams (genus Dioscorea and grasses (family Poaceae).

== Description ==
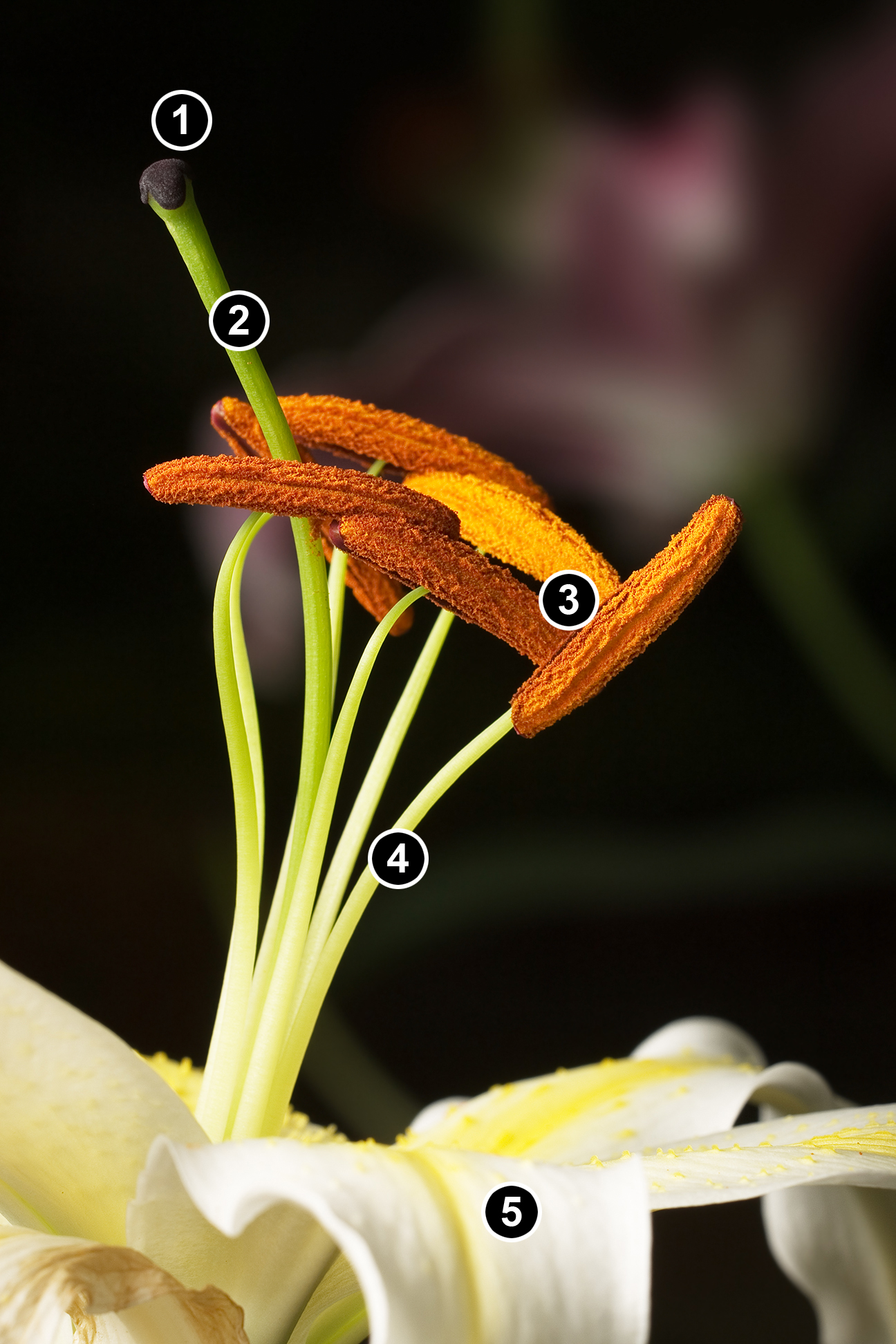
Lilium longiflorum flower – 1. stigma, 2. style, 3. anthers, 4. filament, 5. tepal

Lilies are tall perennials ranging in height from 1–6 ft (30–180 cm). They form naked or tunicless scaly underground bulbs which are their organs of perennation. In some North American species the base of the bulb develops into rhizomes, on which numerous small bulbs are found. Some species develop stolons. Most bulbs are buried deep in the ground, but a few species form bulbs near the soil surface. Many species form stem-roots. With these, the bulb grows naturally at some depth in the soil, and each year the new stem puts out adventitious roots above the bulb as it emerges from the soil. These roots are in addition to the basal roots that develop at the base of the bulb, a number of species also produce contractile roots that move the bulbs deeper into the soil.

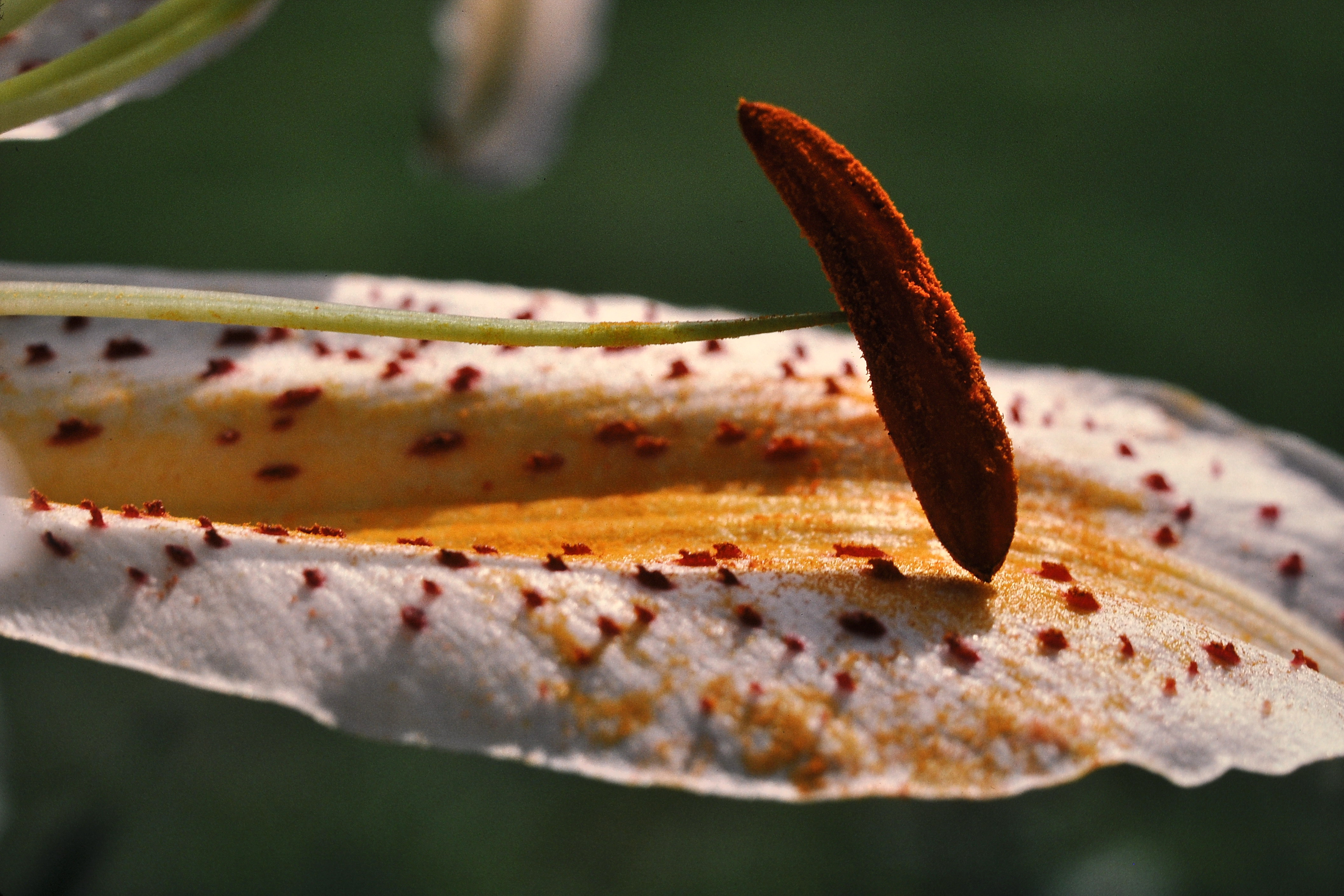
Lily, petal

The flowers are large, often fragrant and come in a wide range of colors including whites, yellows, oranges, pinks, reds and purples. Markings include spots and brush strokes. The plants are late spring- or summer-flowering. Flowers are borne in racemes or umbels at the tip of the stem, with six tepals spreading or reflexed, to give flowers varying from funnel shape to a "Turk's cap". The tepals are free from each other, and bear a nectary at the base of each flower. The ovary is 'superior', borne above the point of attachment of the anthers. The fruit is a three-celled capsule.

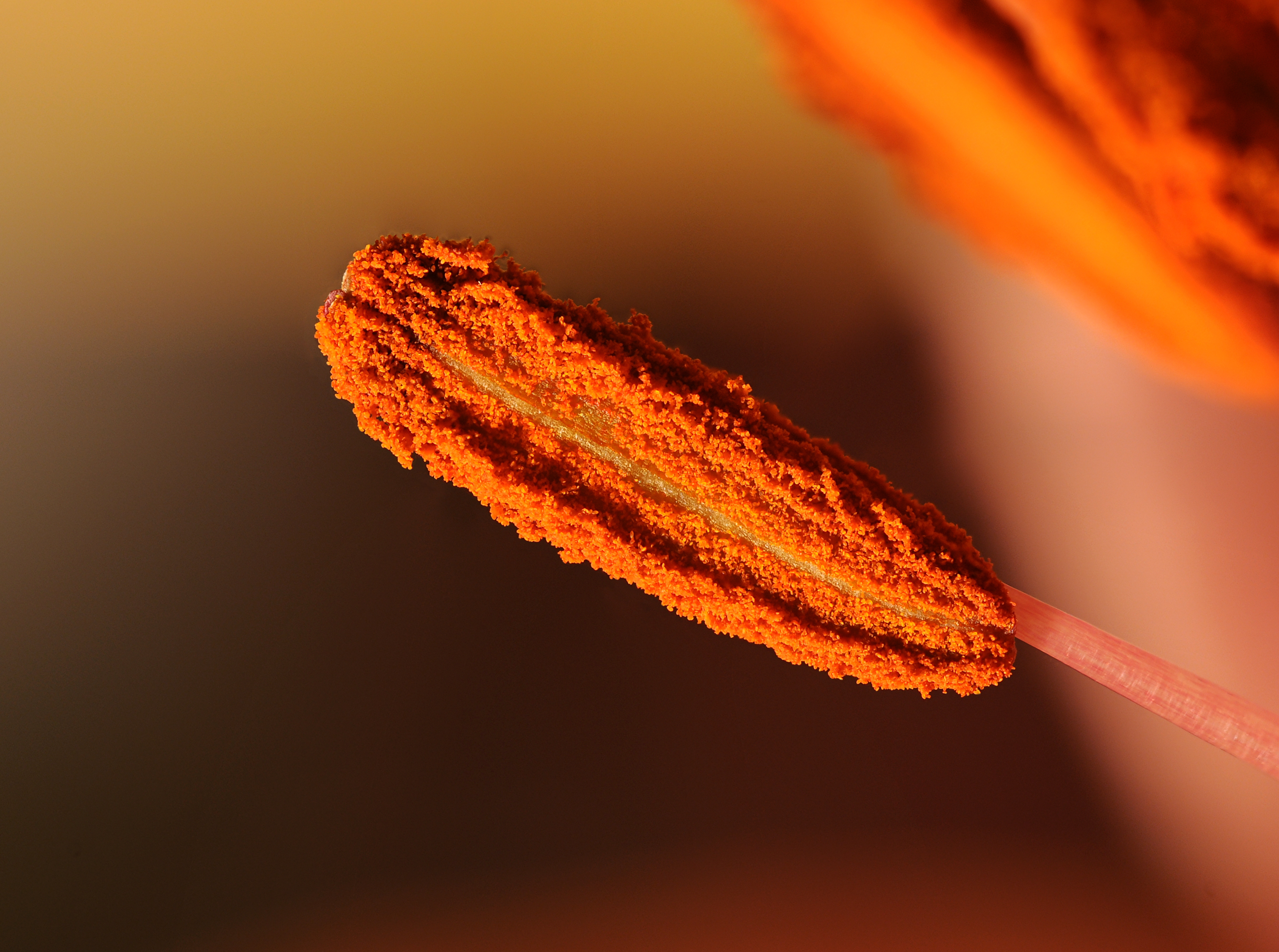
Stamen of lilium

Seeds ripen in late summer. They exhibit varying and sometimes complex germination patterns, many adapted to cool temperate climates.

Most cool temperate species are deciduous and dormant in winter in their native environment. But some species native to areas with hot summers and mild winters (Lilium candidum, L. catesbaei, L. longiflorum) lose their leaves and enter a short dormant period in summer or autumn, sprout from autumn to winter, forming dwarf stems bearing a basal rosette of leaves until, after they have received sufficient chilling, the stem begins to elongate in warming weather.

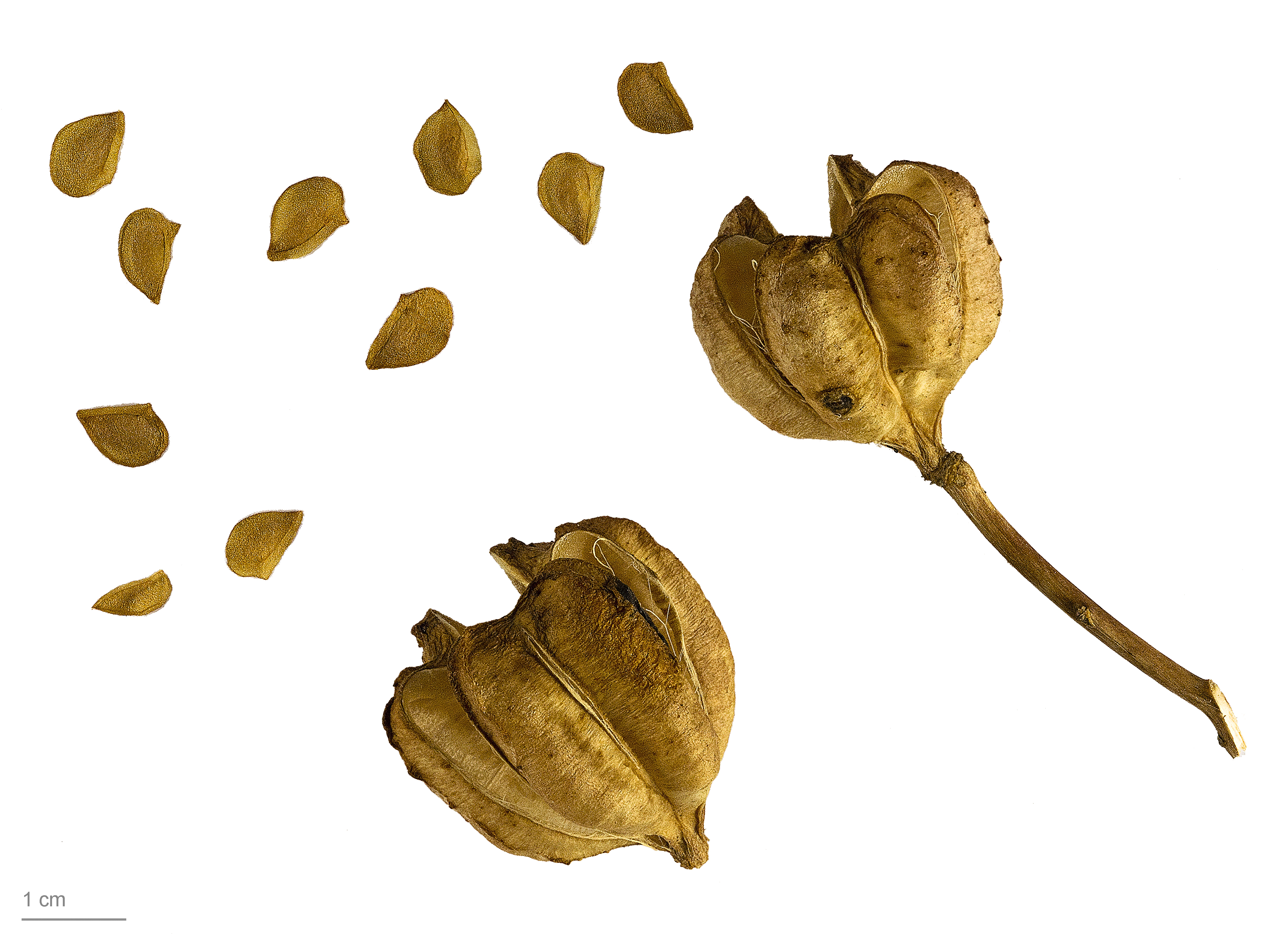
Lilium candidum seeds

The basic chromosome number is twelve (n=12).

== Taxonomy ==
Taxonomical division in sections follows the classical division of Comber, species acceptance follows the World Checklist of Selected Plant Families, the taxonomy of section Pseudolirium is from the Flora of North America, the taxonomy of Section Liriotypus is given in consideration of Resetnik et al. 2007, the taxonomy of Chinese species (various sections) follows the Flora of China and the taxonomy of Section Sinomartagon follows Nishikawa et al. as does the taxonomy of Section Archelirion.

The Sinomartagon are divided into three paraphyletic groups, while the Leucolirion are divided into two paraphyletic groups.

There are seven sections:

- Martagon
- Pseudolirium
- Liriotypus
- Archelirion
- Sinomartagon
- Leucolirion
- Daurolirion

There are 119 species counted in this genus. For a full list of accepted species with their native ranges, see List of Lilium species.

Picture	Section	Sub Section	Botanical name	common name
	Martagon		Lilium distichum	
	Martagon		Lilium hansonii	
	Martagon		Lilium martagon	Martagon or Turk's cap lily
	Martagon		Lilium medeoloides	
	Martagon		Lilium tsingtauense	
	Pseudolirium	2a	Lilium bolanderi	Bolander's Lily
	Pseudolirium	2a	Lilium puberulum	
	Pseudolirium	2a	Lilium kelloggii	
	Pseudolirium	2a	Lilium rubescens	
	Pseudolirium	2a	Lilium washingtonianum	Washington Lily, Shasta Lily, or Mt. Hood Lily
	Pseudolirium	2b	Lilium kelleyanum	
	Pseudolirium	2b	Lilium maritimum	
	Pseudolirium	2b	Lilium occidentale	
	Pseudolirium	2b	Lilium pardalinum	Panther or Leopard lily
	Pseudolirium	2b	Lilium parryi	
	Pseudolirium	2b	Lilium parvum	Sierra tiger lily or Alpine lily
	Pseudolirium	2c	Lilium canadense	Canada Lily or Meadow Lily
	Pseudolirium	2c	Lilium grayi	
	Pseudolirium	2c	Lilium iridollae	
	Pseudolirium	2c	Lilium michiganense	Michigan Lily
	Pseudolirium	2c	Lilium michauxii	Carolina Lily
	Pseudolirium	2c	Lilium superbum	Swamp lily or American tiger lily
	Pseudolirium	2c	Lilium pyrophilum	Sandhills Lily
	Pseudolirium	2d	Lilium catesbaei	
	Pseudolirium	2d	Lilium philadelphicum	Wood lily, Philadelphia lily or prairie lily
	Liriotypus	3a	Lilium candidum	Madonna lily
	Liriotypus	3b	Lilium albanicum	
	Liriotypus	3b	Lilium bosniacum (Lilium carniolicum var. bosniacum)	
	Liriotypus	3b	Lilium chalcedonicum	
	Liriotypus	3b	Lilium carniolicum	
	Liriotypus	3b	Lilium ciliatum	
	Liriotypus	3b	Lilium heldreichii	
	Liriotypus	3b	Lilium jankae	
	Liriotypus	3b	Lilium pomponium	Turban lily
	Liriotypus	3b	Lilium ponticum	
	Liriotypus	3b	Lilium pyrenaicum	
	Liriotypus	3c	Lilium akkusianum	
	Liriotypus	3c	Lilium kesselringianum	
	Liriotypus	3c	Lilium monadelphum	
	Liriotypus	3c	Lilium rhodopeum	
	Liriotypus	3c	Lilium szovitsianum	Polish Lily
	Liriotypus	3c	Lilium polyphyllum	
	Liriotypus	3c	Lilium ledebourii	
	Liriotypus	3d	Lilium bulbiferum	Orange Lily or Fire Lily
	Archelirion	4a	Lilium speciosum	Japanese lily
	Archelirion	4b	Lilium auratum	Golden rayed lily of Japan, or Goldband lily
	Archelirion	4c	Lilium alexandrae	
Lilium japonicum 'Hyuga form' in Mount Hokodake	Archelirion	4c	Lilium japonicum	
	Archelirion	4c	Lilium nobilissimum	
	Archelirion	4d	Lilium brownii	
	Archelirion	4d	Lilium rubellum	
	Archelirion	4d	Lilium platyphyllum	
	Sinomartagon	5a	Lilium davidii	
	Sinomartagon	5a	Lilium duchartrei	
	Sinomartagon	5a	Lilium henryi	Tiger Lily or Henry's lily
	Sinomartagon	5a	Lilium lancifolium	Tiger Lily (often known as L. tigrinum)
	Sinomartagon	5a	Lilium lankongense	
	Sinomartagon	5a	Lilium leichtlinii	
	Sinomartagon	5a	Lilium papilliferum	
	Sinomartagon	5a	Lilium rosthornii	
	Sinomartagon	5b	Lilium amabile	
	Sinomartagon	5b	Lilium callosum	
	Sinomartagon	5b	Lilium cernuum	
	Sinomartagon	5b	Lilium concolor	Morning Star Lily
	Sinomartagon	5b	Lilium fargesii	
	Sinomartagon	5b	Lilium pumilum	Coral Lily, Low Lily, or Siberian Lily
	Sinomartagon	5b	Lilium xanthellum	
	Sinomartagon	5c	Lilium amoenum	
	Sinomartagon	5c	Lilium arboricola	
	Sinomartagon	5c	Lilium bakerianum	
	Sinomartagon	5c	Lilium euxanthum	
	Sinomartagon	5c	Lilium henrici	
	Sinomartagon	5c	Lilium lophophorum	
	Sinomartagon	5c	Lilium mackliniae	Siroi Lily
	Sinomartagon	5c	Lilium majoense	
	Sinomartagon	5c	Lilium nanum	
	Sinomartagon	5c	Lilium nepalense	
	Sinomartagon	5c	Lilium oxypetalum	
	Sinomartagon	5c	Lilium paradoxum	
	Sinomartagon	5c	Lilium poilanei	
	Sinomartagon	5c	Lilium primulinum	
	Sinomartagon	5c	Lilium sempervivoideum	
	Sinomartagon	5c	Lilium sherriffiae	
	Sinomartagon	5c	Lilium souliei	
	Sinomartagon	5c	Lilium stewartianum	
	Sinomartagon	5c	Lilium taliense	
	Sinomartagon	5c	Lilium wardii	
	Sinomartagon	5?	Lilium brevistylum	
	Sinomartagon	5?	Lilium lijiangense	
	Sinomartagon	5?	Lilium anhuiense	
	Sinomartagon	5?	Lilium eupetes	
	Sinomartagon	5?	Lilium habaense	
	Sinomartagon	5?	Lilium huidongense	
	Sinomartagon	5?	Lilium jinfushanense	
	Sinomartagon	5?	Lilium matangense	
	Sinomartagon	5?	Lilium medogense	
	Sinomartagon	5?	Lilium pinifolium	
	Sinomartagon	5?	Lilium pyi	
	Sinomartagon	5?	Lilium saccatum	
	Sinomartagon	5?	Lilium tianschanicum	
	Sinomartagon	5?	Lilium floridum	
	Leucolirion	6a	Lilium leucanthum	
	Leucolirion	6a	Lilium regale	
	Leucolirion	6a	Lilium sargentiae	
	Leucolirion	6a	Lilium sulphureum	
	Leucolirion	6a	Lilium wenshanense	
	Leucolirion	6b	Lilium anhuiense	
	Leucolirion	6b	Lilium formosanum	
	Leucolirion	6b	Lilium longiflorum	Easter Lily
	Leucolirion	6b	Lilium neilgherrense	
	Leucolirion	6b	Lilium philippinense	Benguet lily
	Leucolirion	6b	Lilium wallichianum	
	Leucolirion	6b	Lilium zairii	
	Leucolirion	6b	Lilium puerense	
	Daurolirion		Lilium dauricum	
	Daurolirion		Lilium maculatum	
	Daurolirion		Lilium pensylvanicum	
			Lilium armenum	
			Lilium bosniacum	
			Lilium columbianum	
			Lilium debile	
			Lilium humboldtii	
			Lilium rockii	

Some species formerly included within this genus have now been placed in other genera. These genera include Cardiocrinum, Notholirion, and Fritillaria. Four other genuses, Lirium, Martagon, and Nomocharis are considered to synonyms by most sources.

=== Etymology ===
The botanic name Lilium is the Latin form and is a Linnaean name. The Latin name is derived from the Greek word λείριον leírion, generally assumed to refer to true, white lilies as exemplified by the Madonna lily. The word was borrowed from Coptic ϩ̀ⲣⲏⲣⲓ pronounced [hreri] from ḥrry, Demotic Egyptian form of earlier ḥrr.t "flower". Ancient Greek: κρῖνον (krīnon) was used by the Greeks, albeit for lilies of any color.

The term "lily" has in the past been applied to numerous flowering plants, often with only superficial resemblance to the true lily, including water lily, fire lily, lily of the Nile, calla lily, trout lily, kaffir lily, cobra lily, lily of the valley, daylily, ginger lily, Amazon lily, leek lily, Peruvian lily, and others. All English translations of the Bible render the Hebrew שׁוֹשַׁנָּה shōshannā and שׁוֹשַׁנ shūshan ~ shōshan as "lily"; but the "lily among the thorns" of Song of Solomon, for instance, may be the honeysuckle.

== Distribution and habitat ==
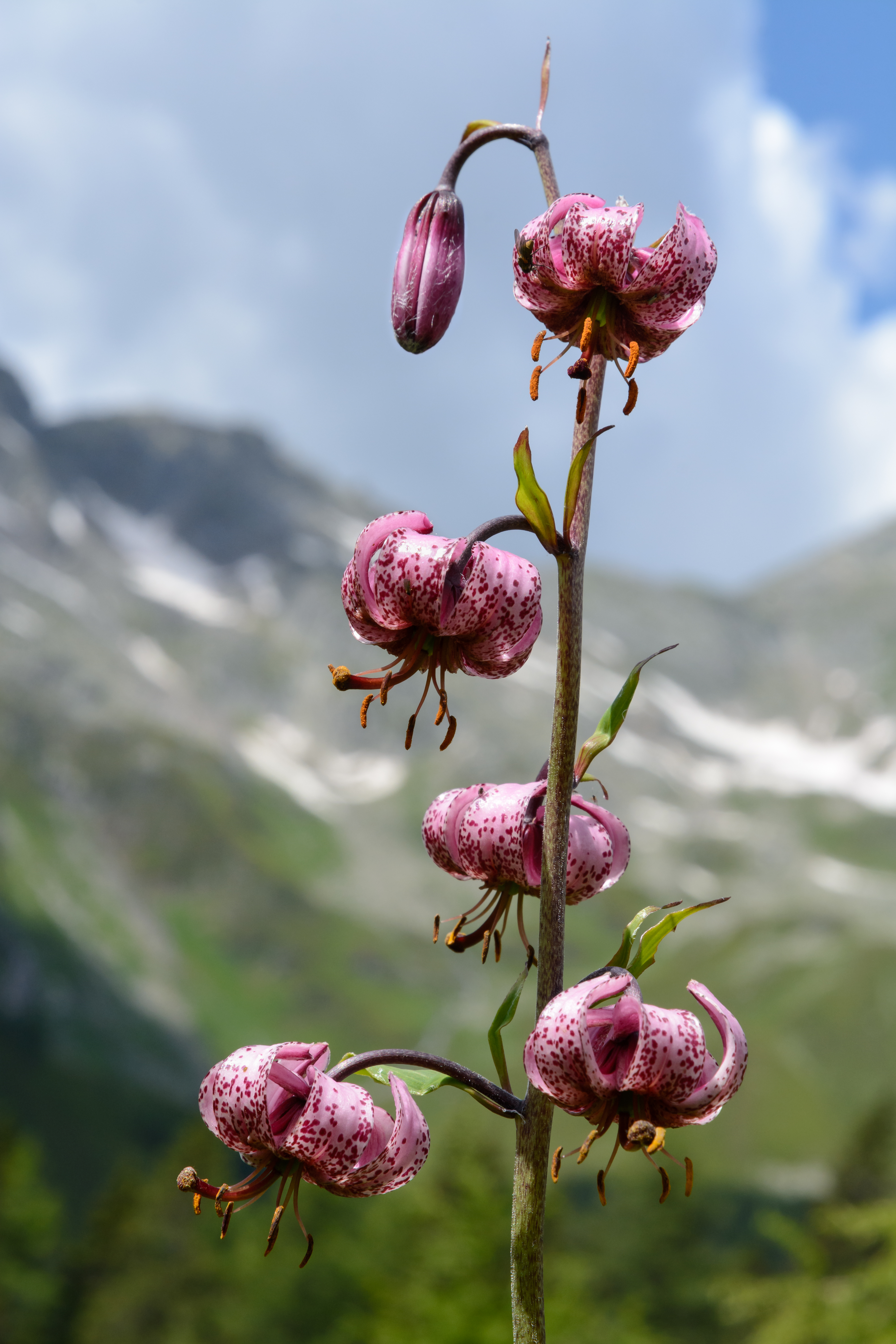
Turk's cap lily growing in the Carinthian Alps

The range of lilies in the Old World extends across much of Europe, across most of Asia to Japan, south to India, and east to Indochina and the Philippines. In the New World they extend from southern Canada through much of the United States. They are commonly adapted to either woodland habitats, often montane, or sometimes to grassland habitats. A few can survive in marshland and epiphytes are known in tropical southeast Asia. In general they prefer moderately acidic or lime-free soils.

== Ecology ==
Lilies are used as food plants by the larvae of some Lepidoptera species including the Dun-bar.

The proliferation of deer (e.g. Odocoileus virginianus) in North America, mainly due to factors such as the elimination of large predators for human safety, is responsible there for a downturn in lily populations in the wild and is a threat to garden lilies as well. Fences as high as 8 feet may be required to prevent them from consuming the plants, an impractical solution for most wild areas.

== Cultivation ==
Many species are widely grown in the garden in temperate, sub-tropical and tropical regions. Numerous ornamental hybrids have been developed. They are used in herbaceous borders, woodland and shrub plantings, and as patio plants. Some lilies, especially Lilium longiflorum, form important cut flower crops or potted plants. These are forced to flower outside of the normal flowering season for particular markets; for instance, Lilium longiflorum for the Easter trade, when it may be called the Easter lily.

Lilies are usually planted as bulbs in the dormant season. They are best planted in a south-facing (northern hemisphere), slightly sloping aspect, in sun or part shade, at a depth 2½ times the height of the bulb (except Lilium candidum which should be planted at the surface). Most prefer a porous, loamy soil, and good drainage is essential. Most species bloom in July or August (northern hemisphere). The flowering periods of certain lily species begin in late spring, while others bloom in late summer or early autumn. They have contractile roots which pull the plant down to the correct depth, therefore it is better to plant them too shallowly than too deep. A soil pH of around 6.5 is generally safe. Most grow best in well-drained soils, and plants are watered during the growing season. Some species and cultivars have strong wiry stems, but those with heavy flower heads are staked to stay upright.

=== Awards ===
The following lily species and cultivars currently hold the Royal Horticultural Society's Award of Garden Merit (confirmed 2017):

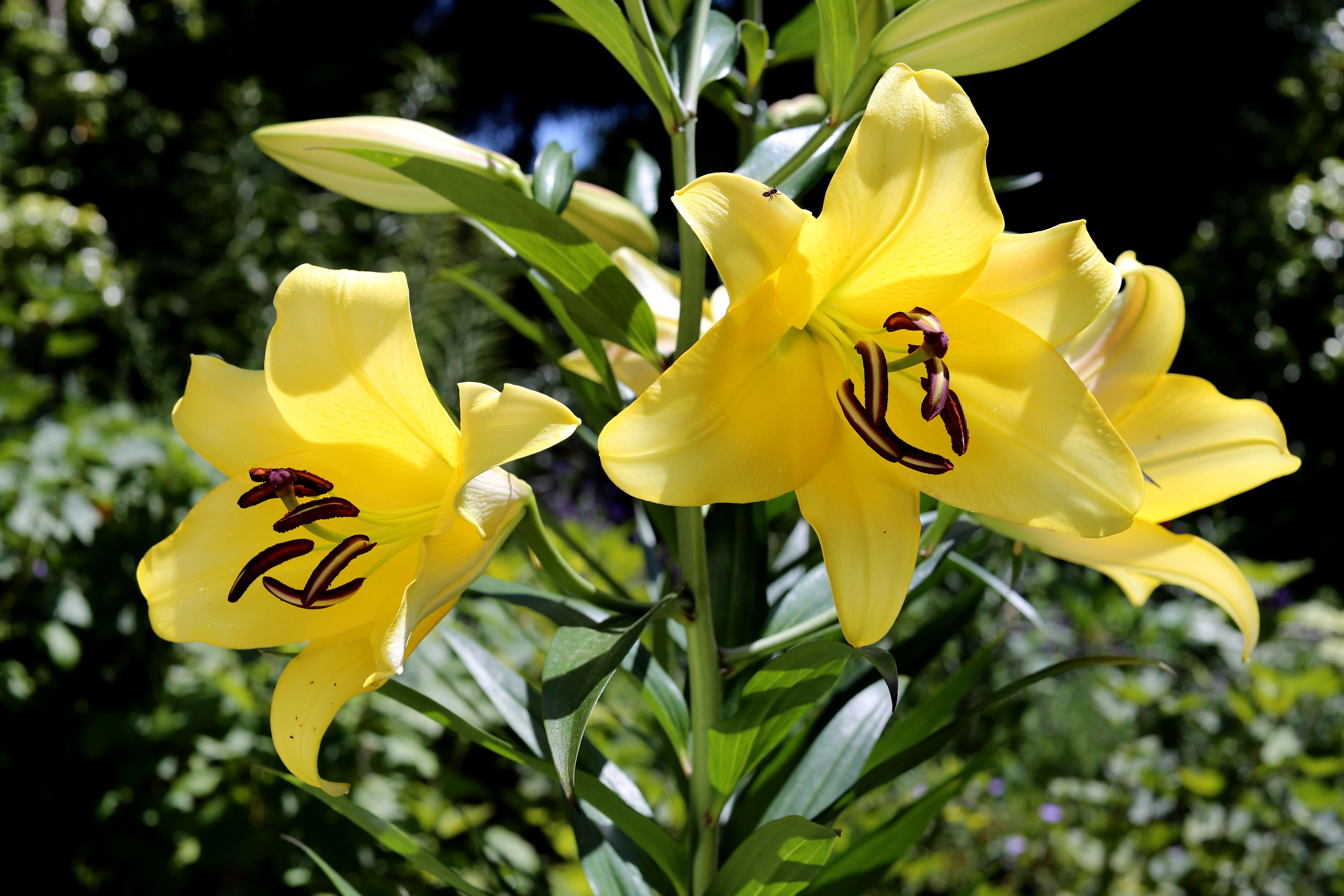
'Golden Splendor'

- African Queen Group (VI-/a) 2002 H6
- 'Casa Blanca' (VIIb/b-c) 1993 H6
- 'Fata Morgana' (Ia/b) 2002 H6
- 'Garden Party' (VIIb/b) 2002 H6
- Golden Splendor Group (VIb-c/a)
- Lilium henryi (IXc/d) 1993 H6
- Lilium mackliniae (IXc/a) 2012 H5
- Lilium martagon – Turk's cap lily (IXc/d)
- Lilium pardalinum – leopard lily (IXc/d)
- Pink Perfection Group (VIb/a)
- Lilium regale – regal lily, king's lily (IXb/a)

=== Classification of garden forms ===
Numerous forms, mostly hybrids, are grown for the garden. They vary according to the species and interspecific hybrids that they derived from, and are classified in the following broad groups:

==== Asiatic hybrids (Division I) ====
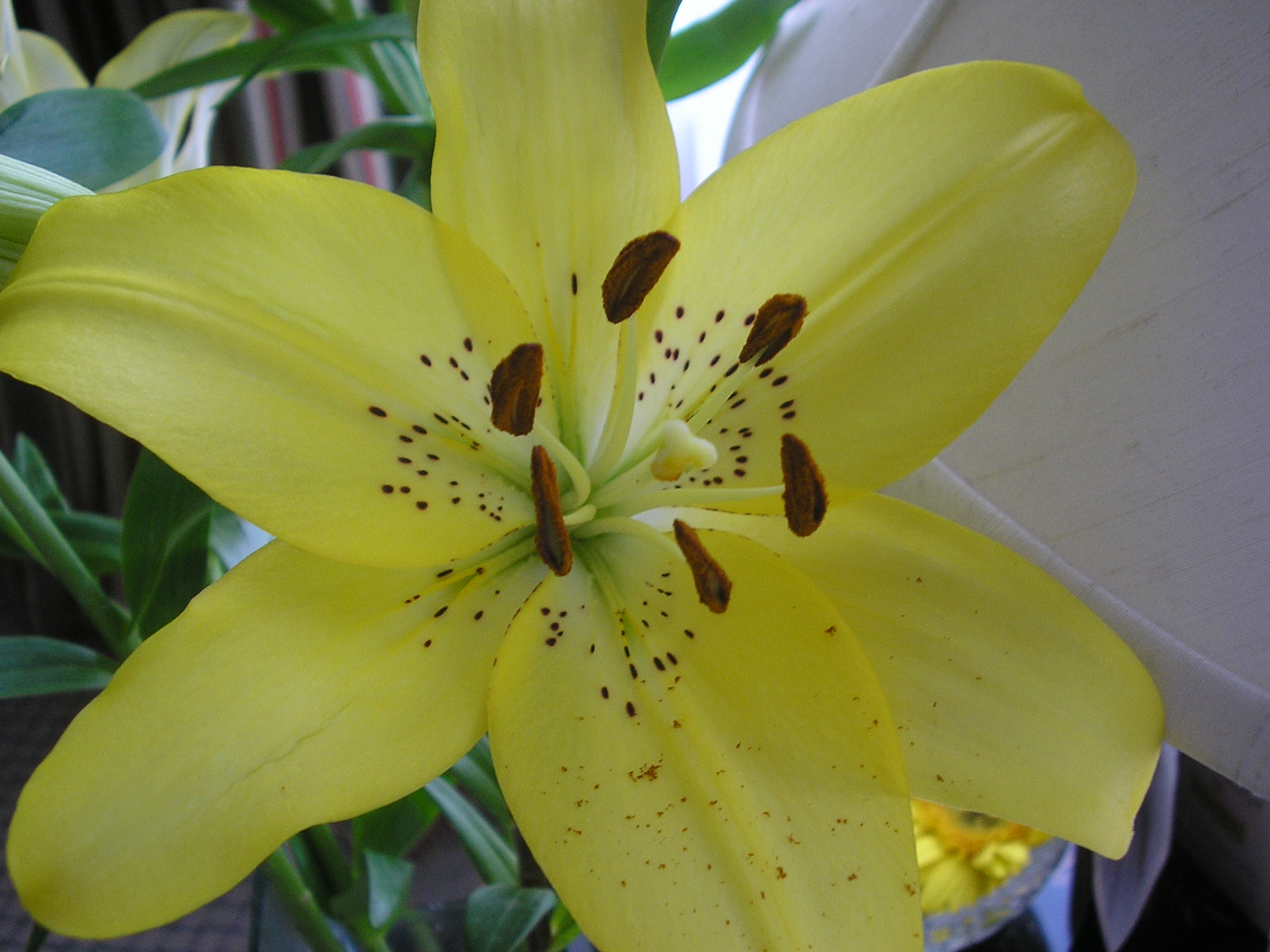

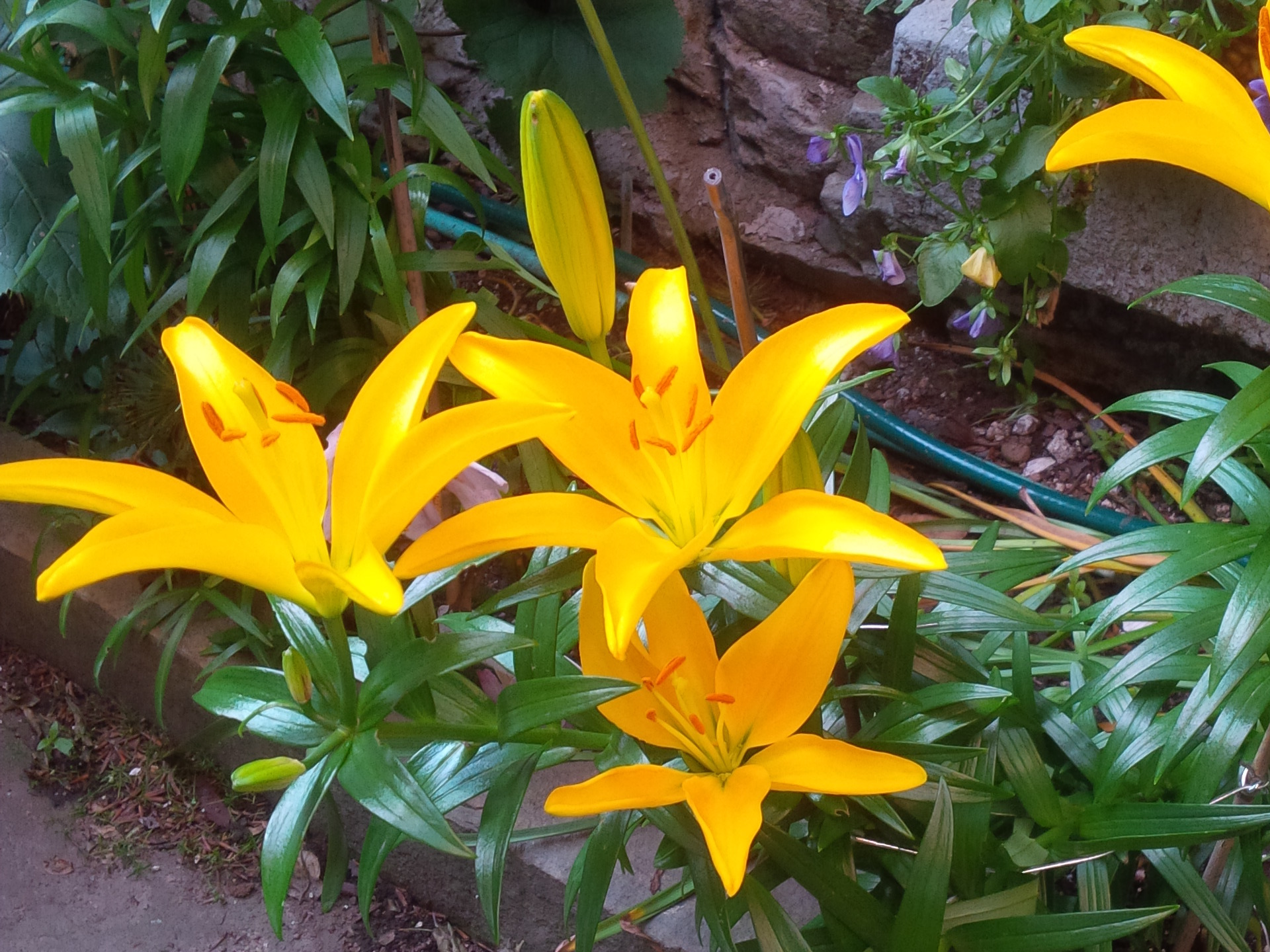

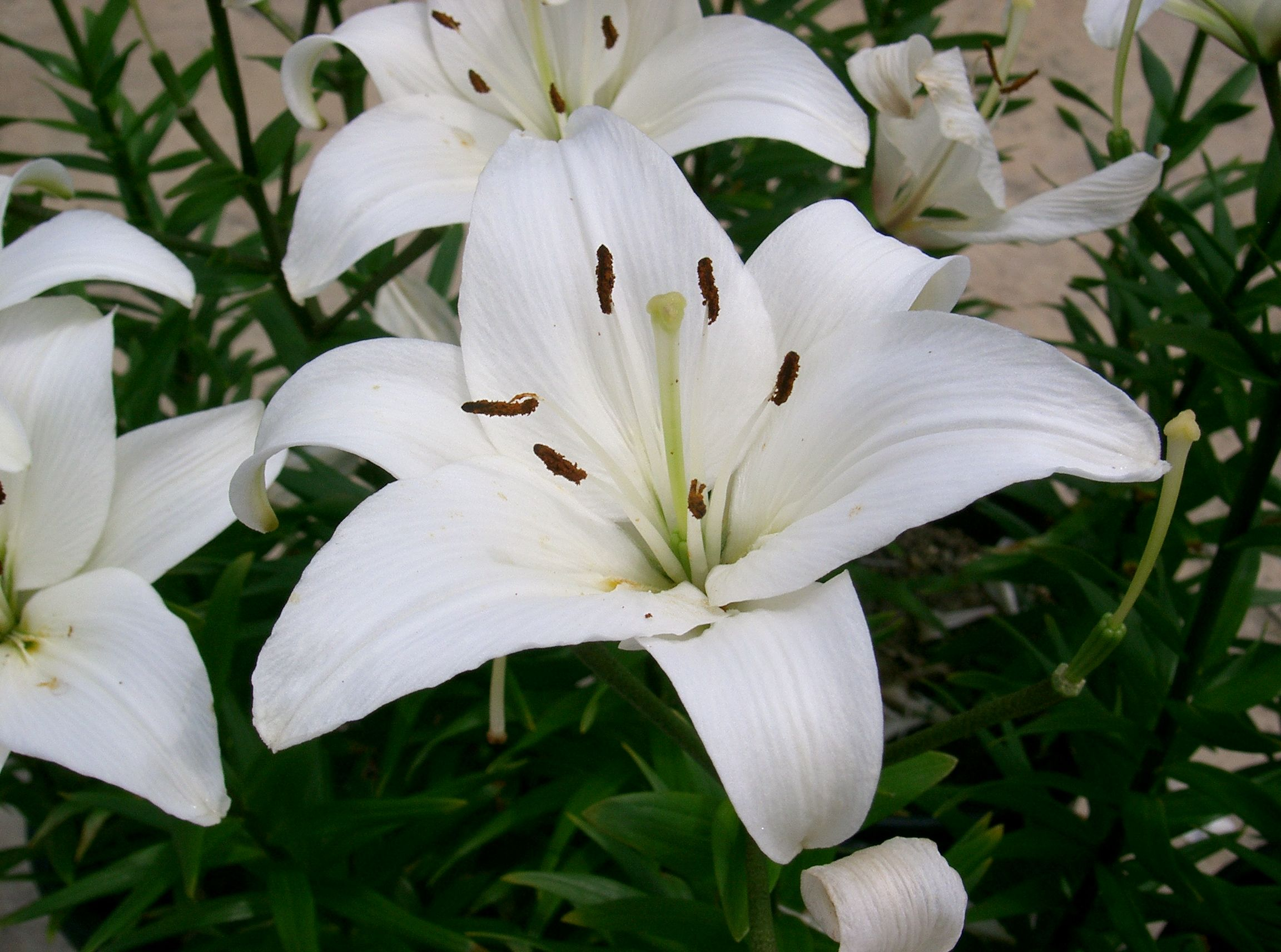

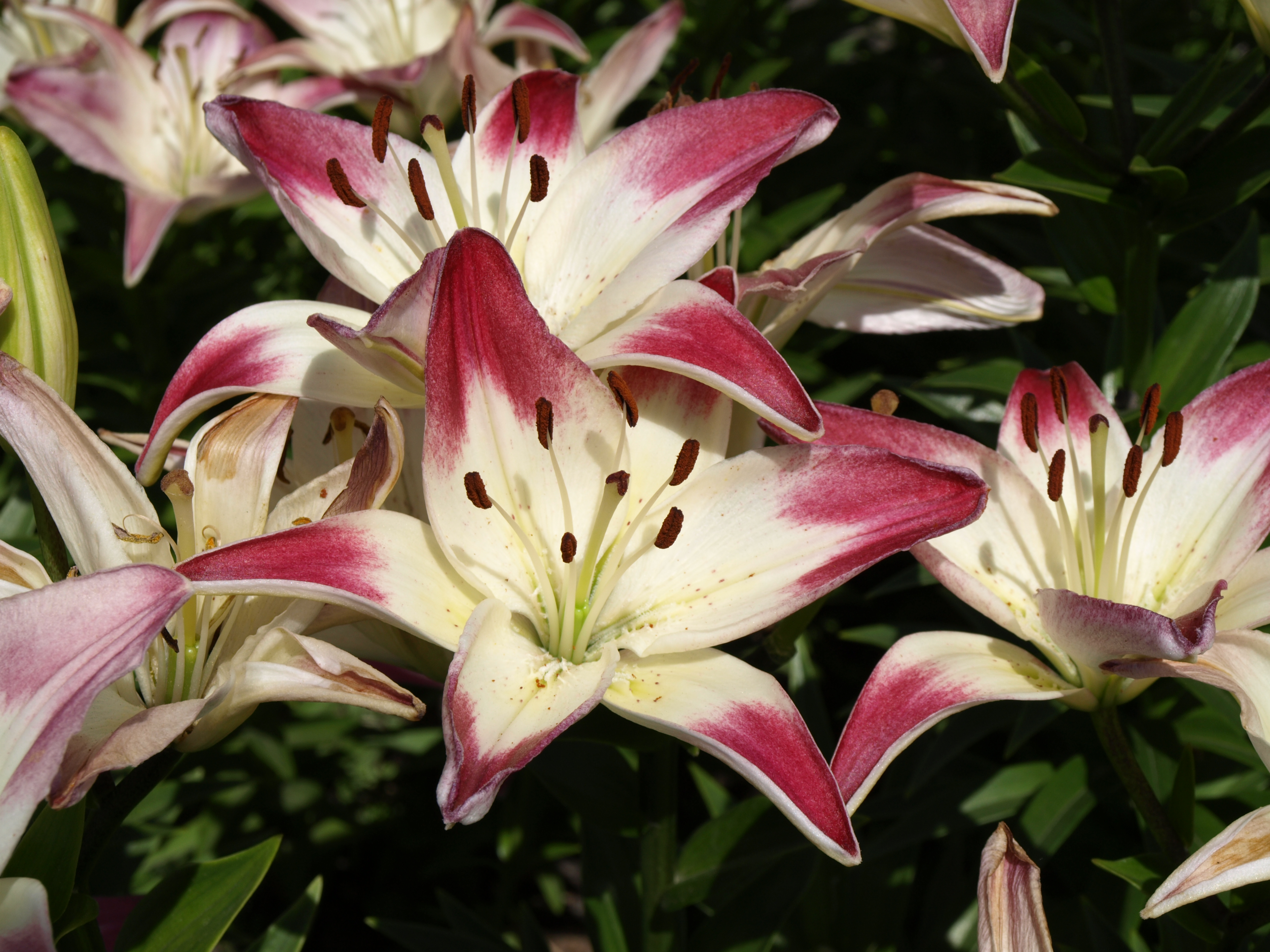

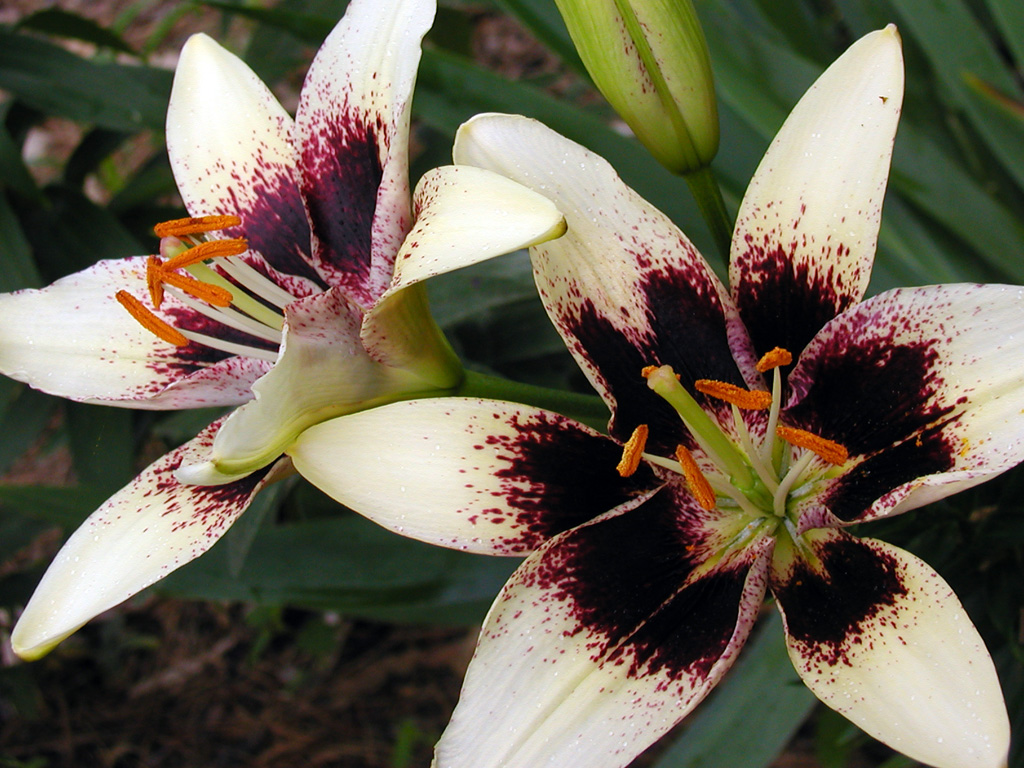

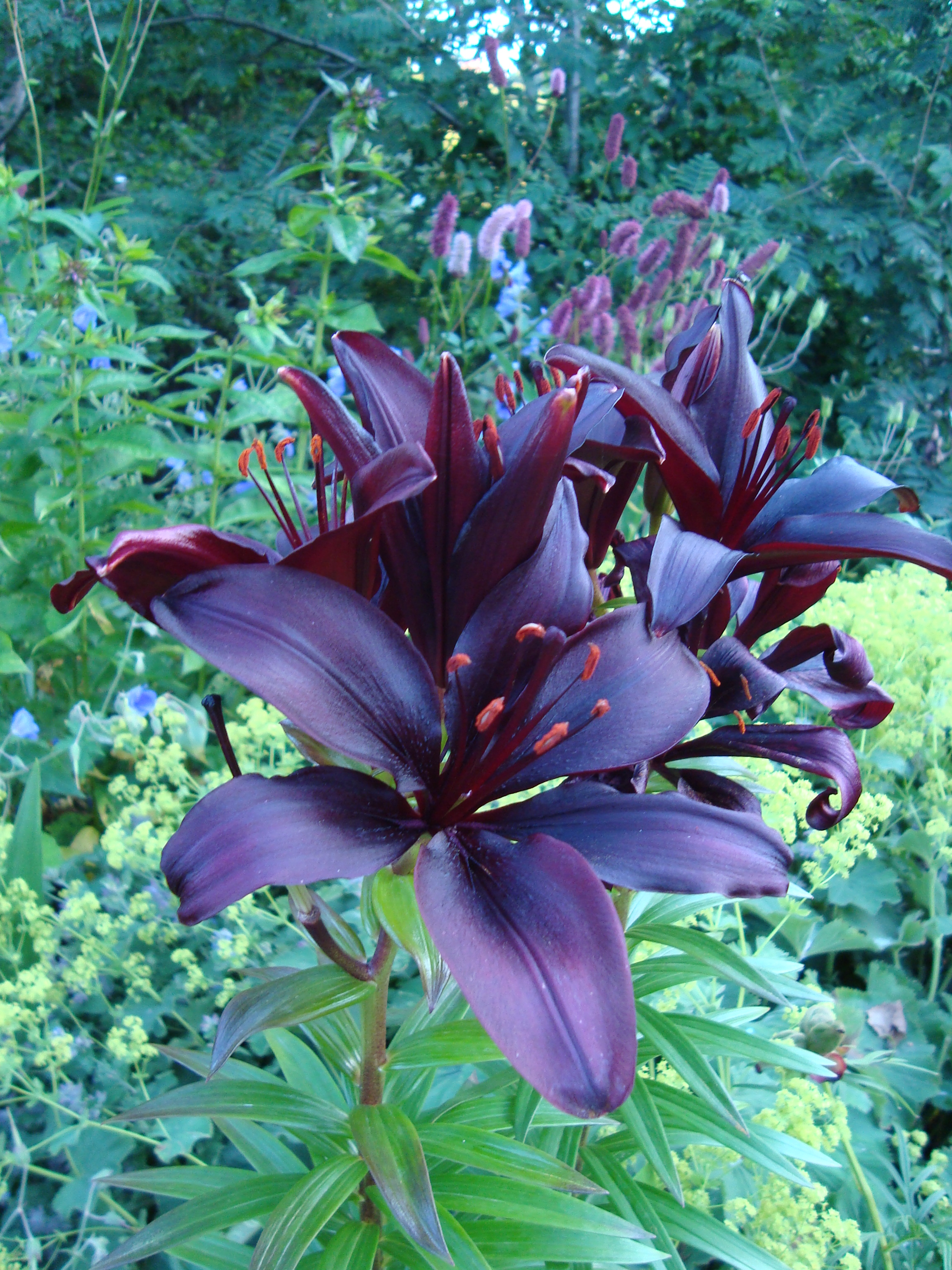

These are derived from hybrids between species in Lilium section Sinomartagon.
They are derived from central and East Asian species and interspecific hybrids, including Lilium amabile, Lilium bulbiferum, Lilium callosum, Lilium cernuum, Lilium concolor, Lilium dauricum, Lilium davidii, Lilium × hollandicum, Lilium lancifolium (syn. Lilium tigrinum), Lilium lankongense, Lilium leichtlinii, Lilium × maculatum, Lilium pumilum, Lilium × scottiae, Lilium wardii and Lilium wilsonii.
These are plants with medium-sized, upright or outward facing flowers, mostly unscented. There are various cultivars such as Lilium 'Cappuccino', Lilium 'Dimension', Lilium 'Little Kiss' and Lilium 'Navona'.

- Dwarf (Patio, Border) varieties are much shorter, c.36–61 cm in height and were designed for containers. They often bear the cultivar name 'Tiny', such as the 'Lily Looks' series, e.g. 'Tiny Padhye', 'Tiny Dessert'.

==== Martagon hybrids (Division II) ====
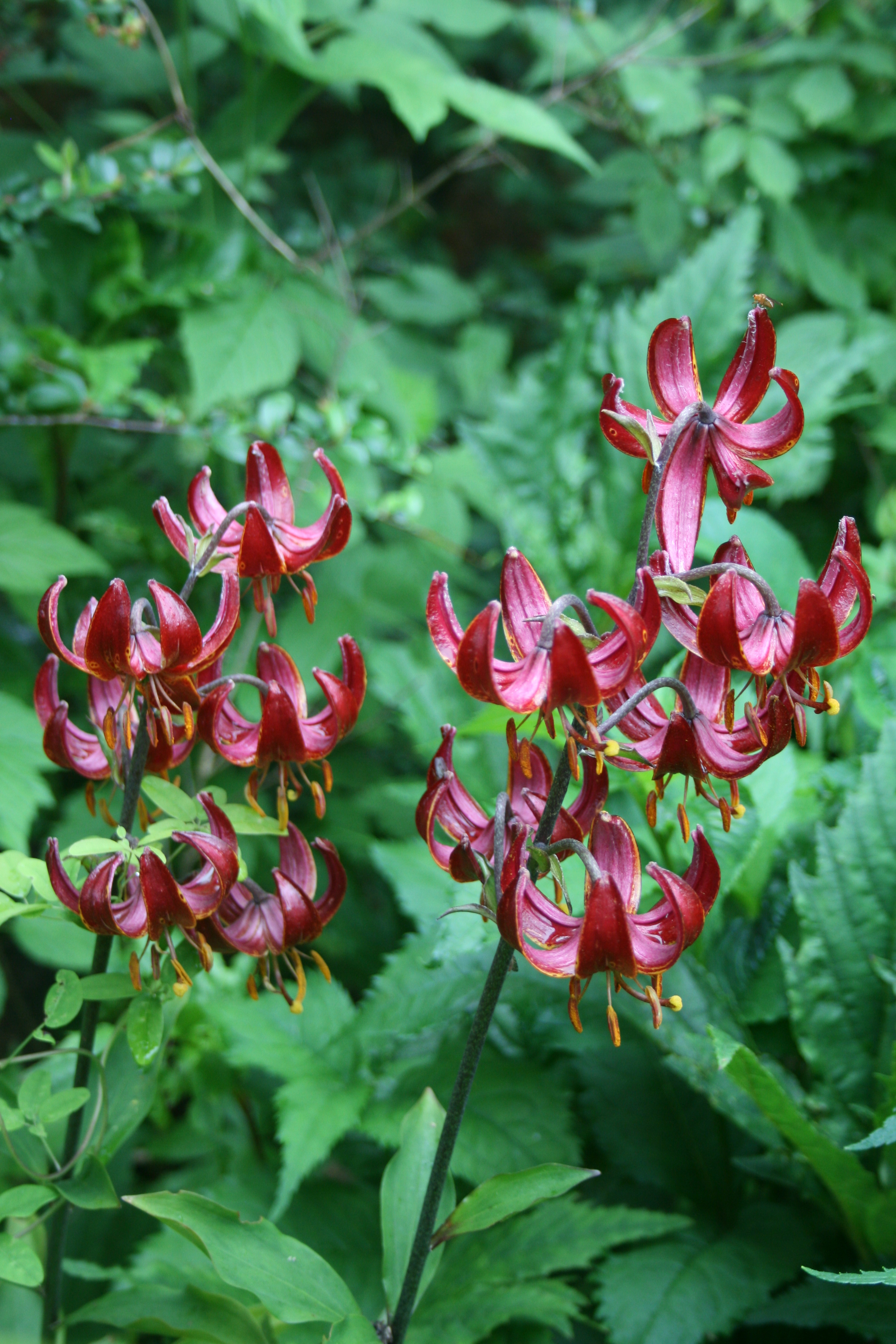

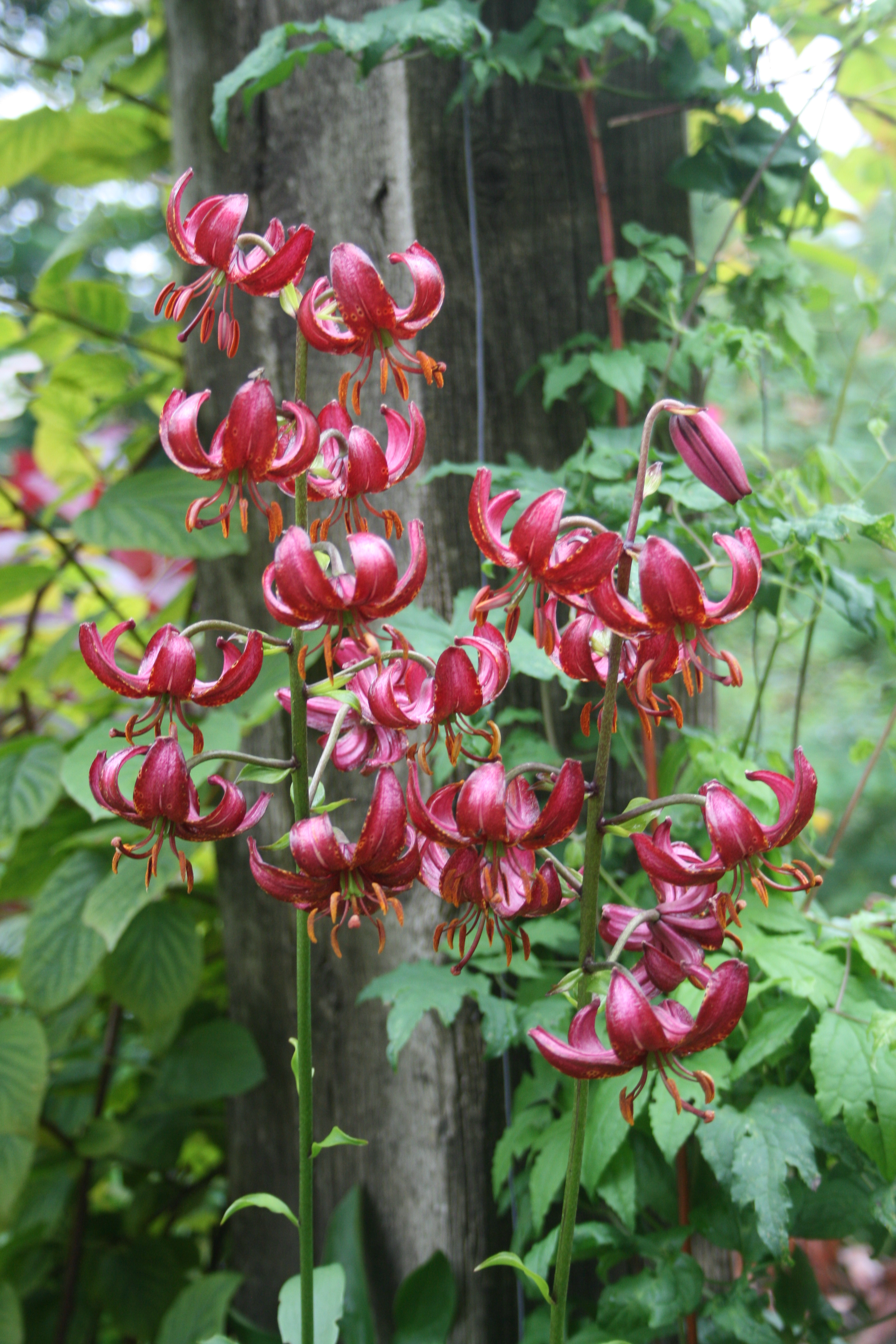

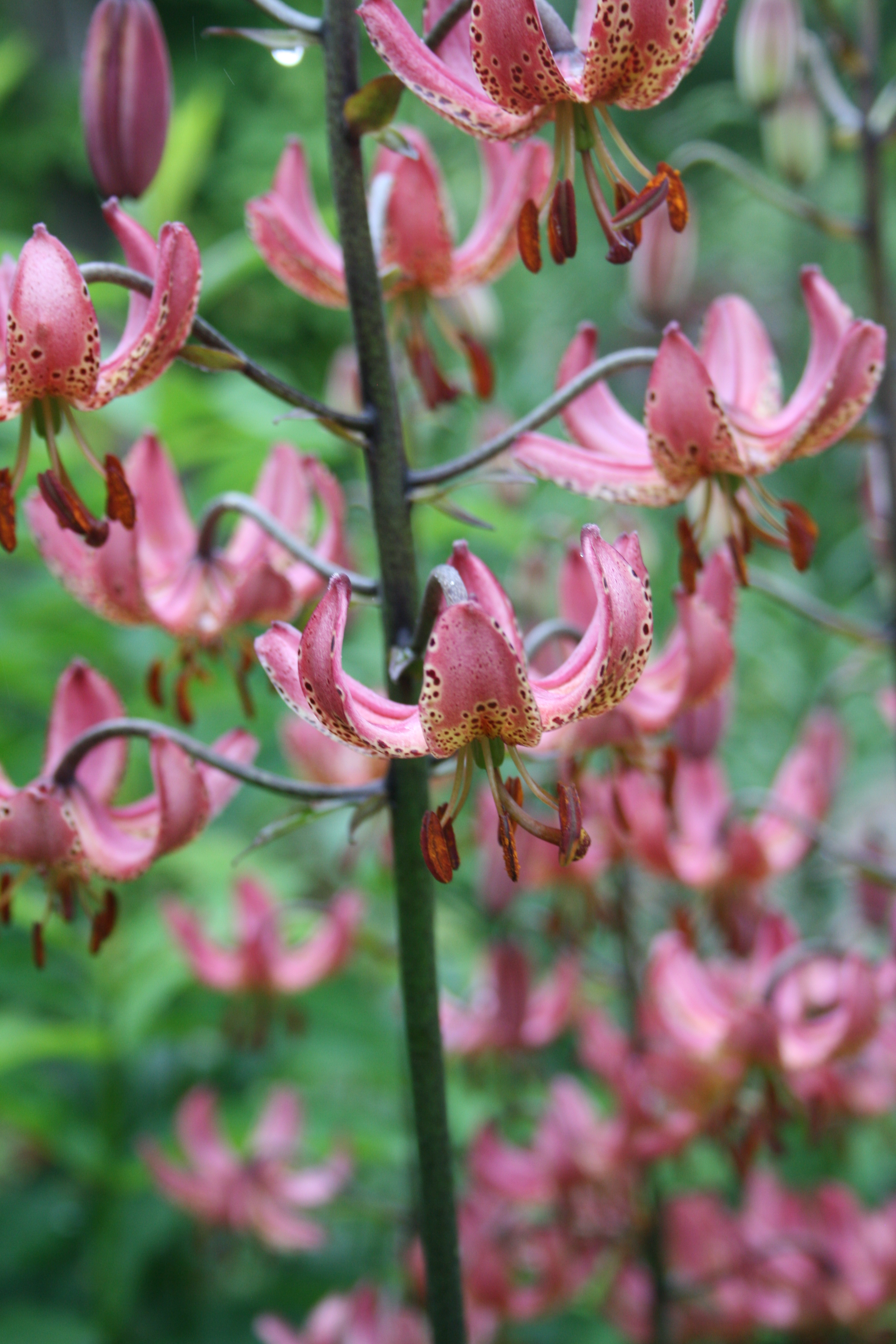

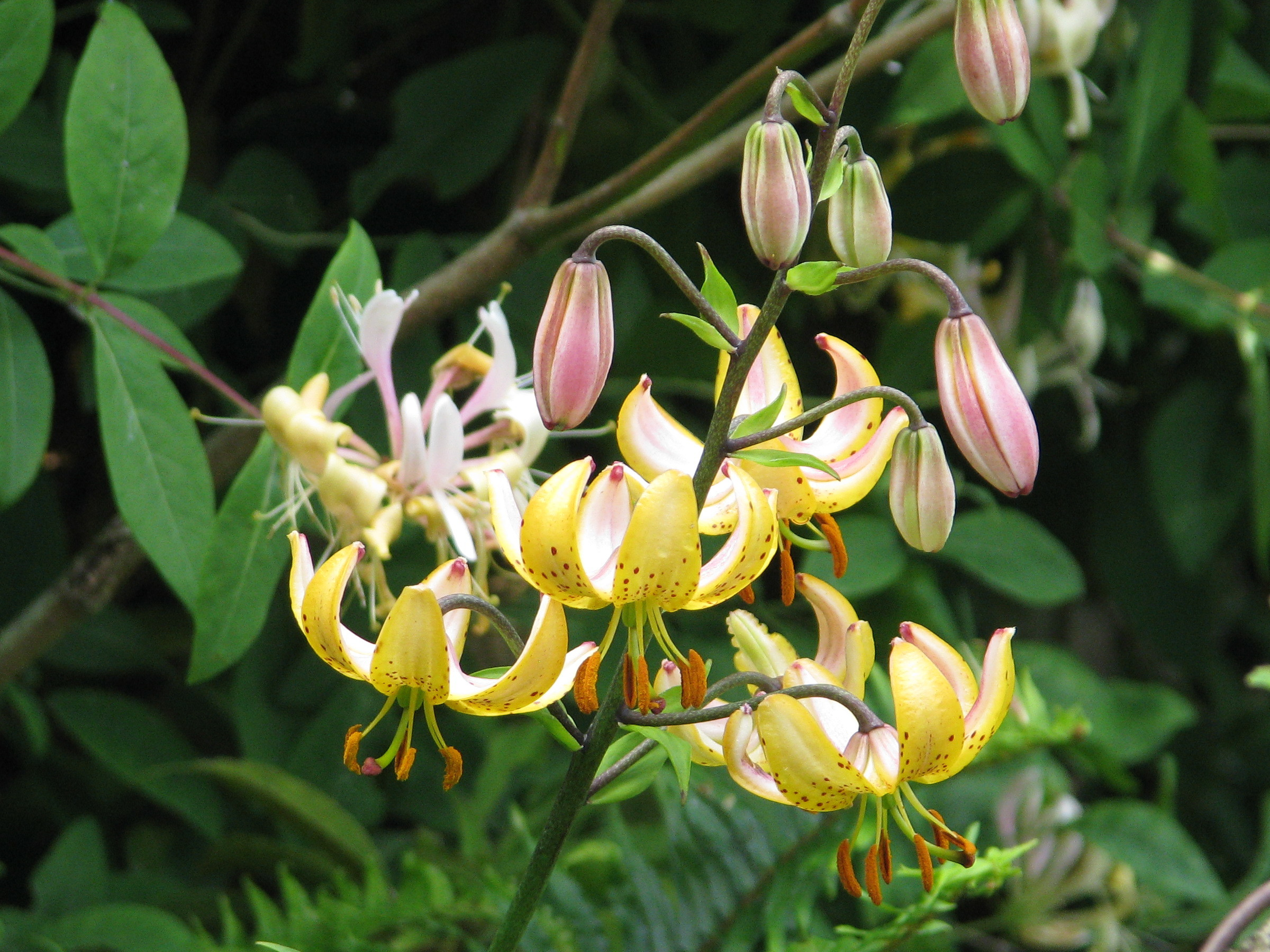

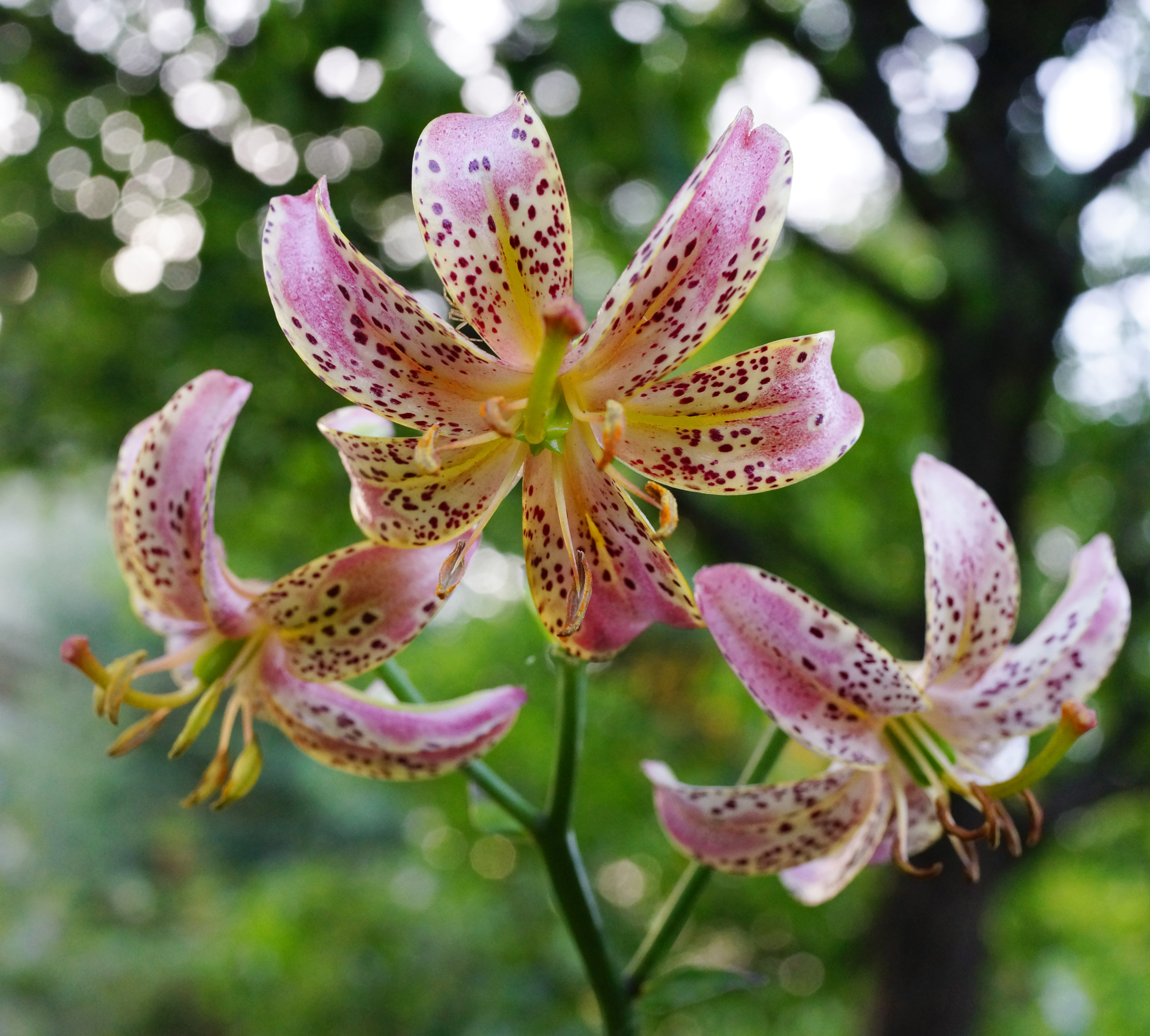

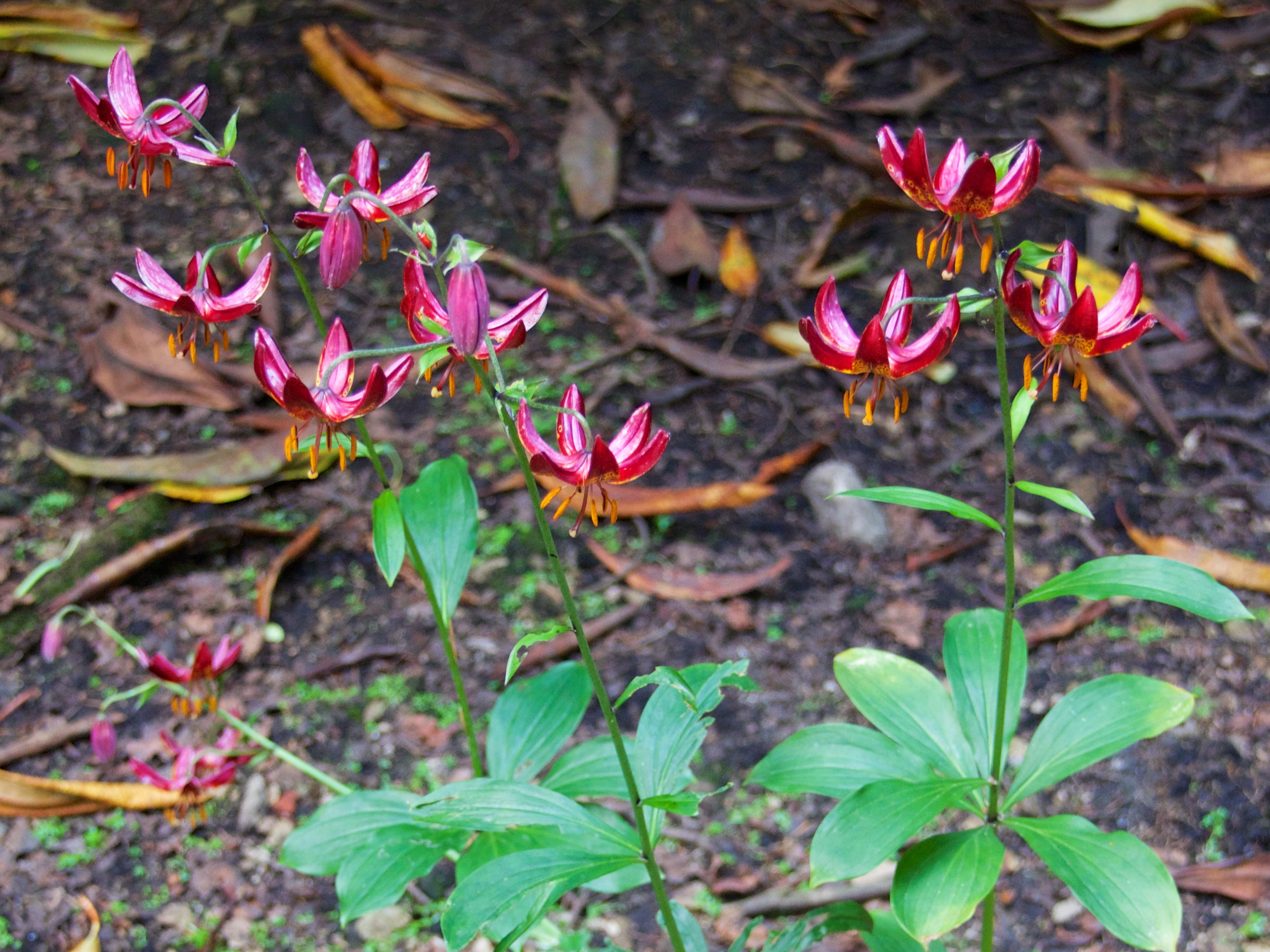

These are based on Lilium dalhansonii, Lilium hansonii, Lilium martagon, Lilium medeoloides, and Lilium tsingtauense.
The flowers are nodding, Turk's cap style (with the petals strongly recurved).

==== Candidum (Euro-Caucasian) hybrids (Division III) ====
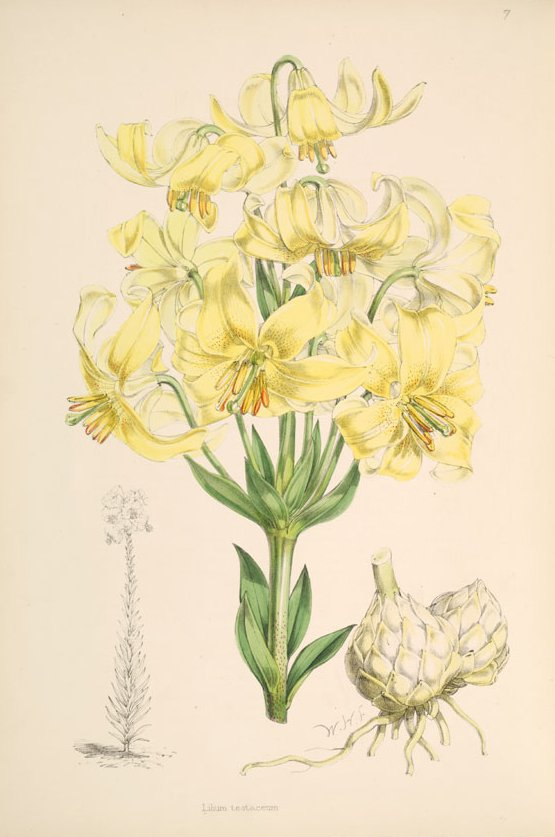

This includes mostly European species: Lilium candidum, Lilium chalcedonicum, Lilium kesselringianum, Lilium monadelphum, Lilium pomponium, Lilium pyrenaicum and Lilium × testaceum.

==== American hybrids (Division IV) ====
These are mostly taller growing forms, originally derived from Lilium bolanderi, Lilium × burbankii, Lilium canadense, Lilium columbianum, Lilium grayi, Lilium humboldtii, Lilium kelleyanum, Lilium kelloggii, Lilium maritimum, Lilium michauxii, Lilium michiganense, Lilium occidentale, Lilium × pardaboldtii, Lilium pardalinum, Lilium parryi, Lilium parvum, Lilium philadelphicum, Lilium pitkinense, Lilium superbum, Lilium ollmeri, Lilium washingtonianum, and Lilium wigginsii.
Many are clump-forming perennials with rhizomatous rootstocks.

==== Longiflorum hybrids (Division V) ====
These are cultivated forms of this species and its subspecies.
They are most important as plants for cut flowers, and are less often grown in the garden than other hybrids.

==== Trumpet lilies (Division VI), including Aurelian hybrids (with L. henryi) ====
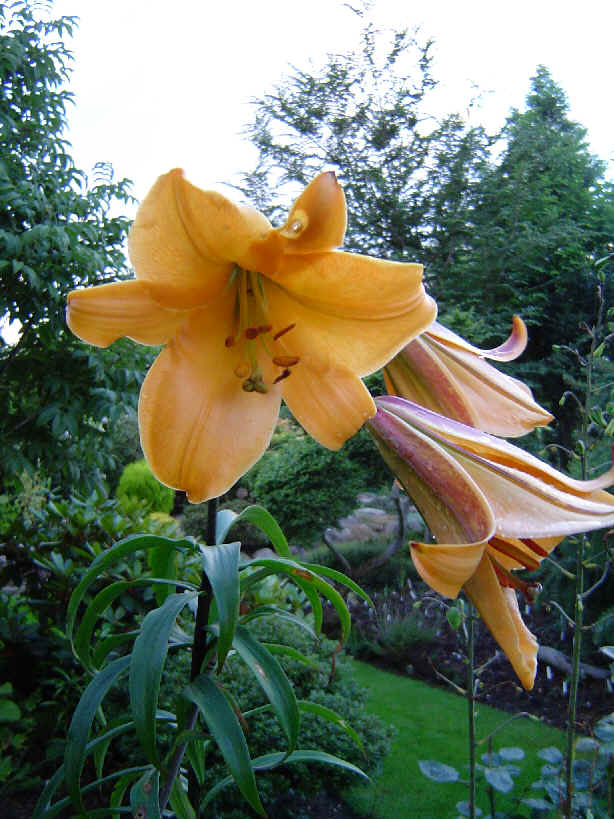

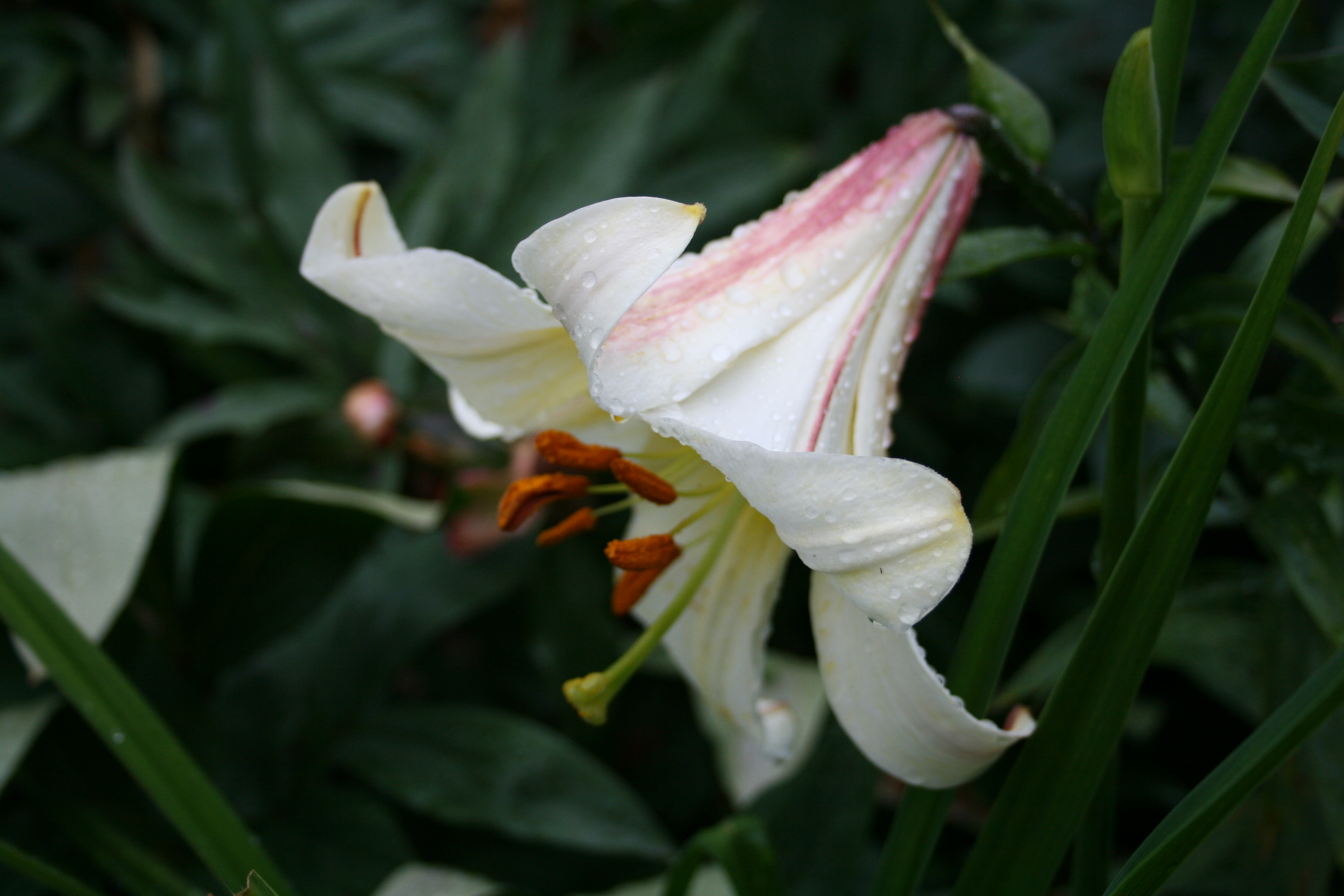

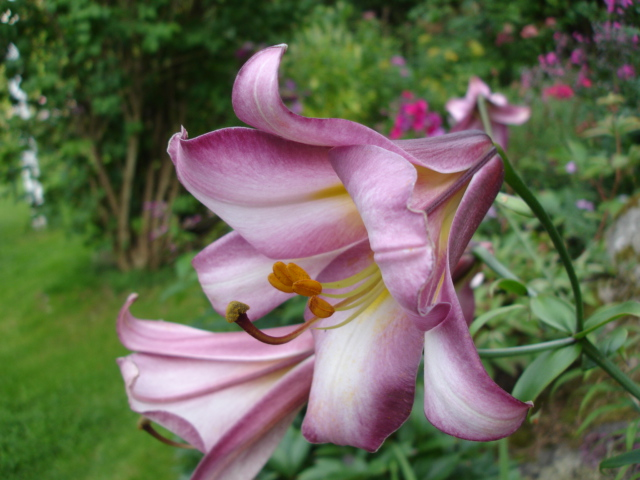

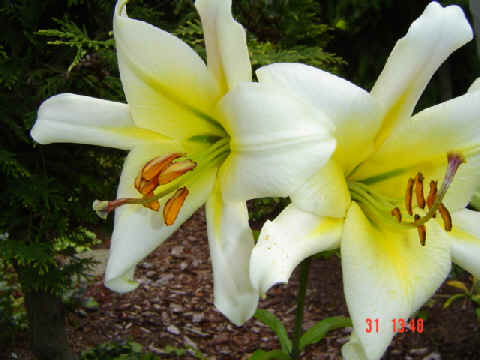

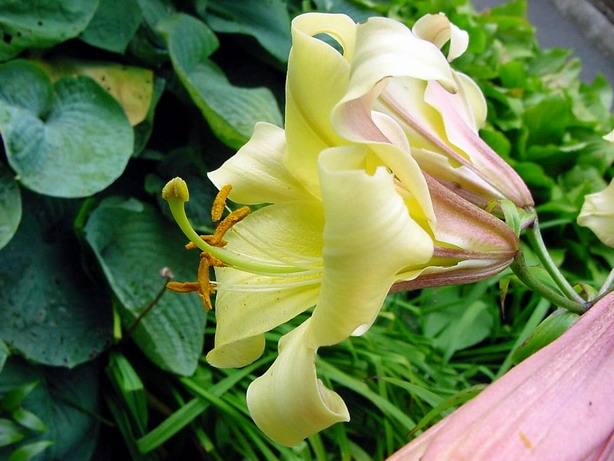

This group includes hybrids of many Asiatic species and their interspecific hybrids, including Lilium × aurelianense, Lilium brownii, Lilium × centigale, Lilium henryi, Lilium × imperiale, Lilium × kewense, Lilium leucanthum, Lilium regale, Lilium rosthornii, Lilium sargentiae, Lilium sulphureum and Lilium × sulphurgale.
The flowers are trumpet shaped, facing outward or somewhat downward, and tend to be strongly fragrant, often especially night-fragrant.

==== Oriental hybrids (Division VII) ====
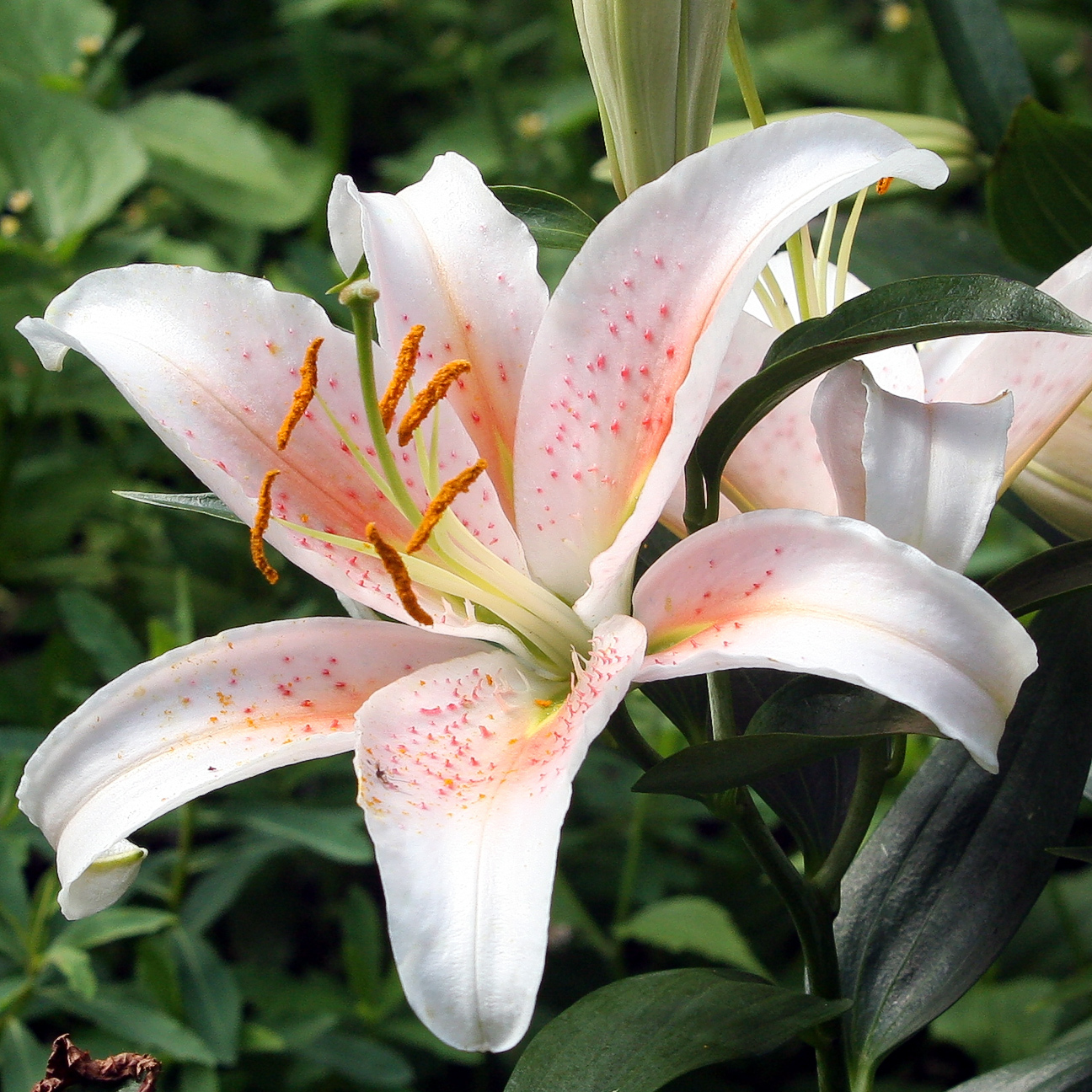

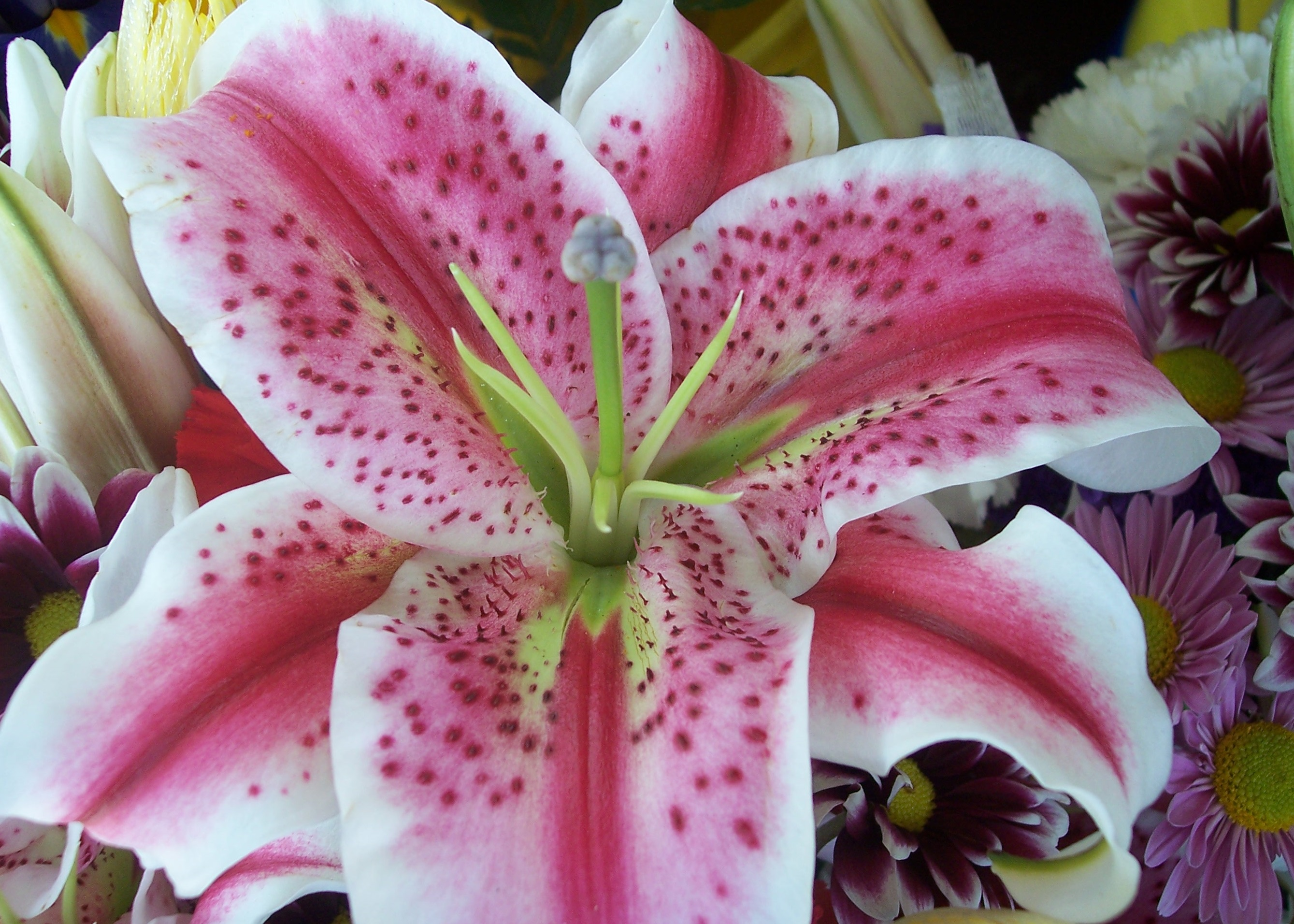

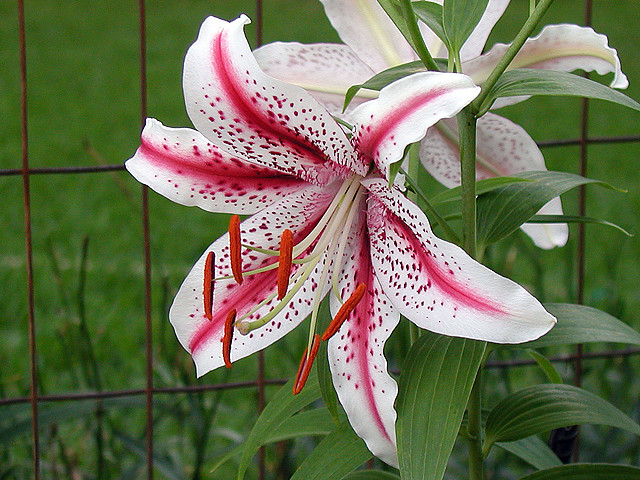

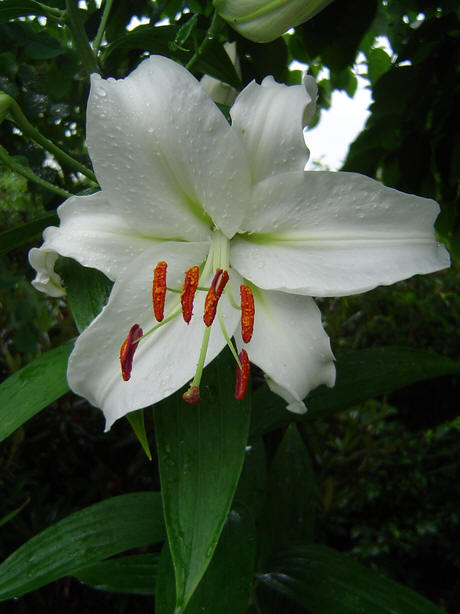

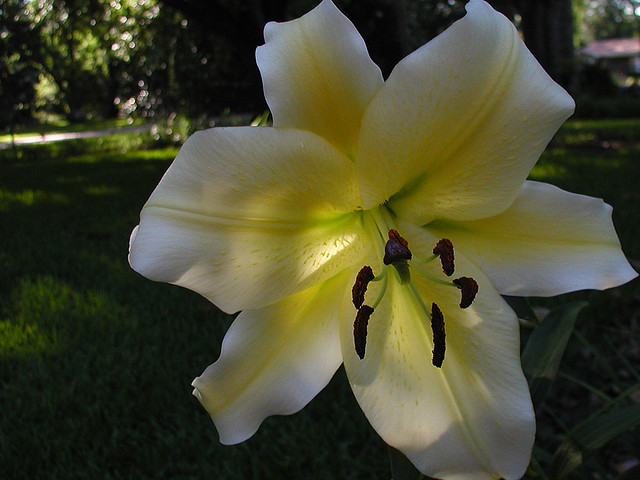

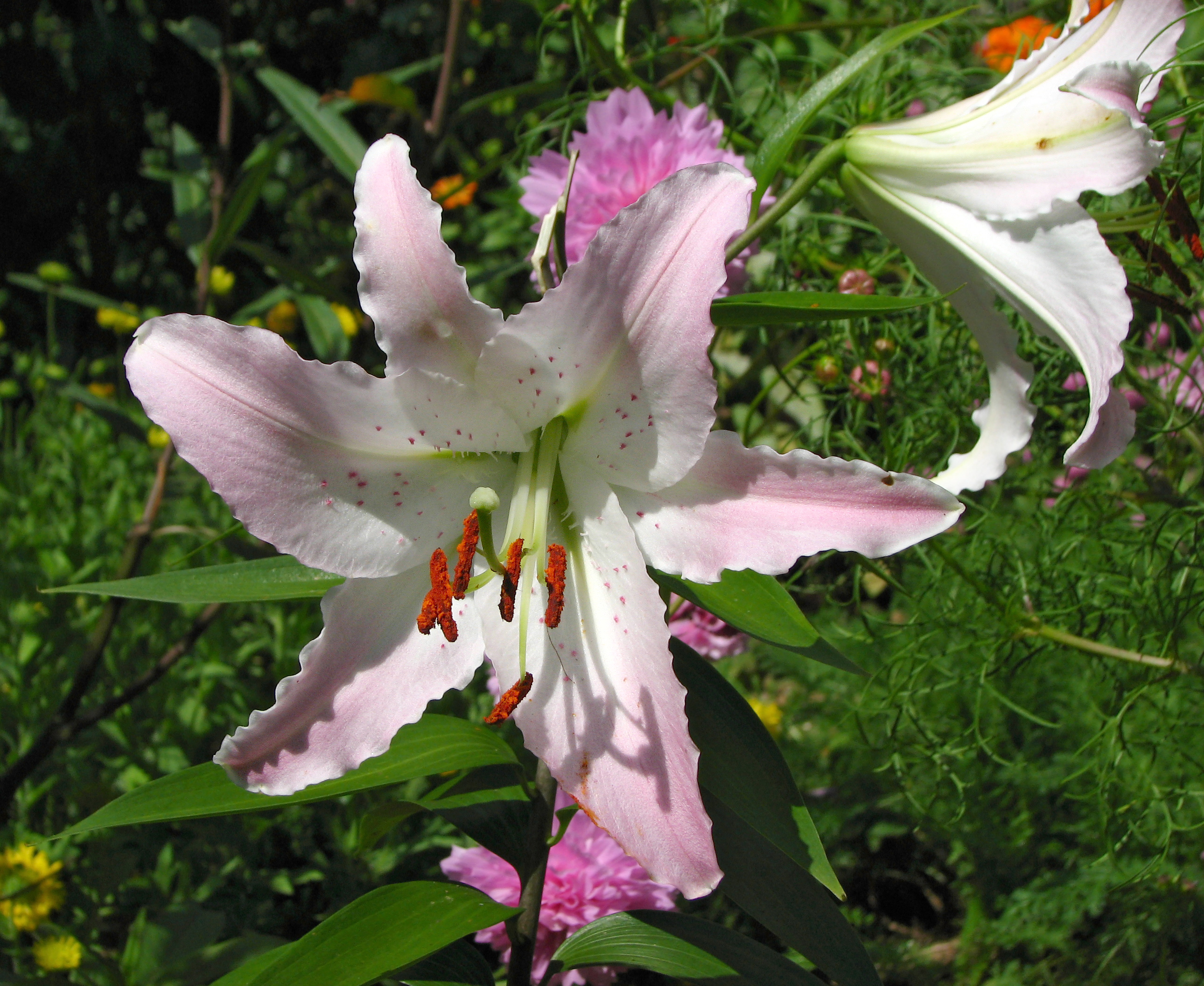

These are based on hybrids within Lilium section Archelirion, specifically Lilium auratum and Lilium speciosum, together with crossbreeds from several species native to Japan, including Lilium nobilissimum, Lilium rubellum, Lilium alexandrae, and Lilium japonicum.
They are fragrant, and the flowers tend to be outward facing. Plants tend to be tall, and the flowers may be quite large. The whole group are sometimes referred to as "stargazers" because many of them appear to look upwards. (For the specific cultivar, see Lilium 'Stargazer'.)

==== Other hybrids (Division VIII) ====
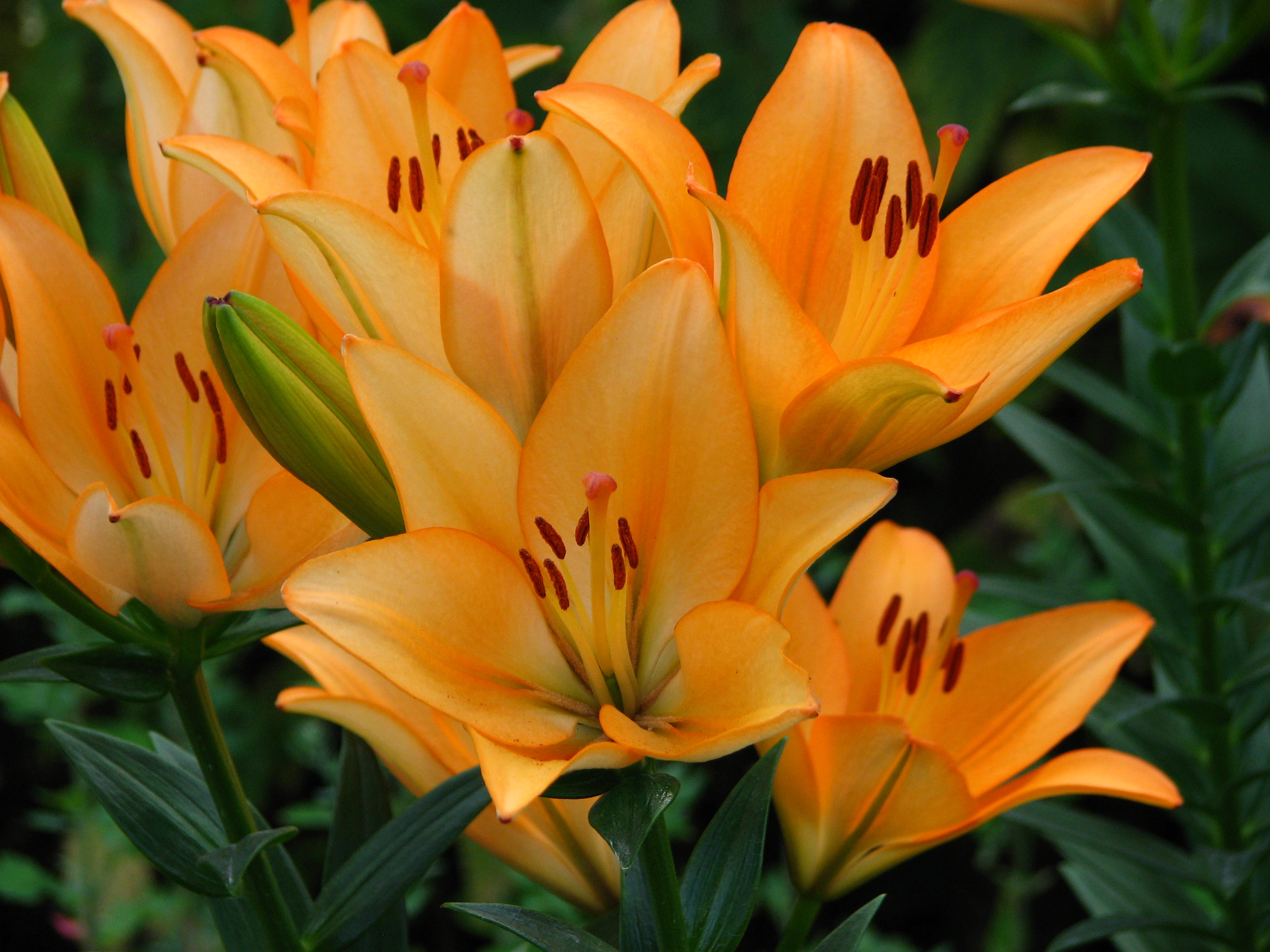

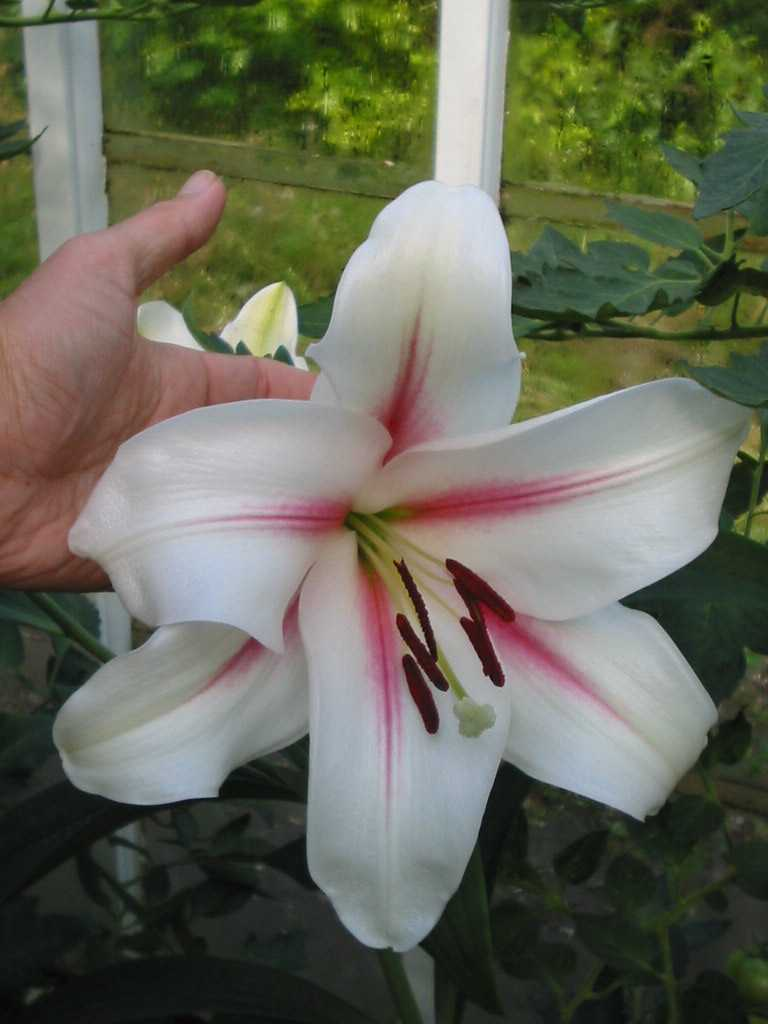

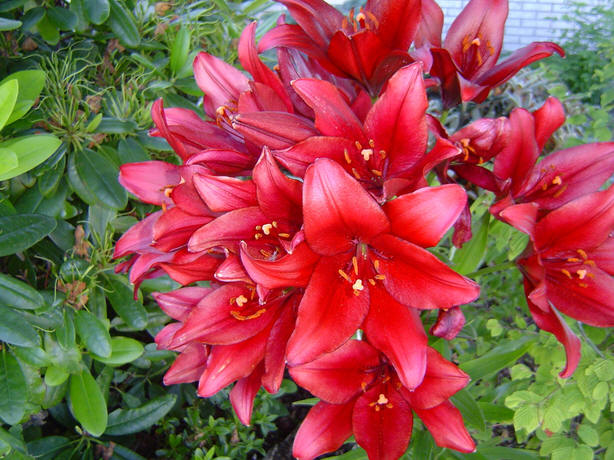

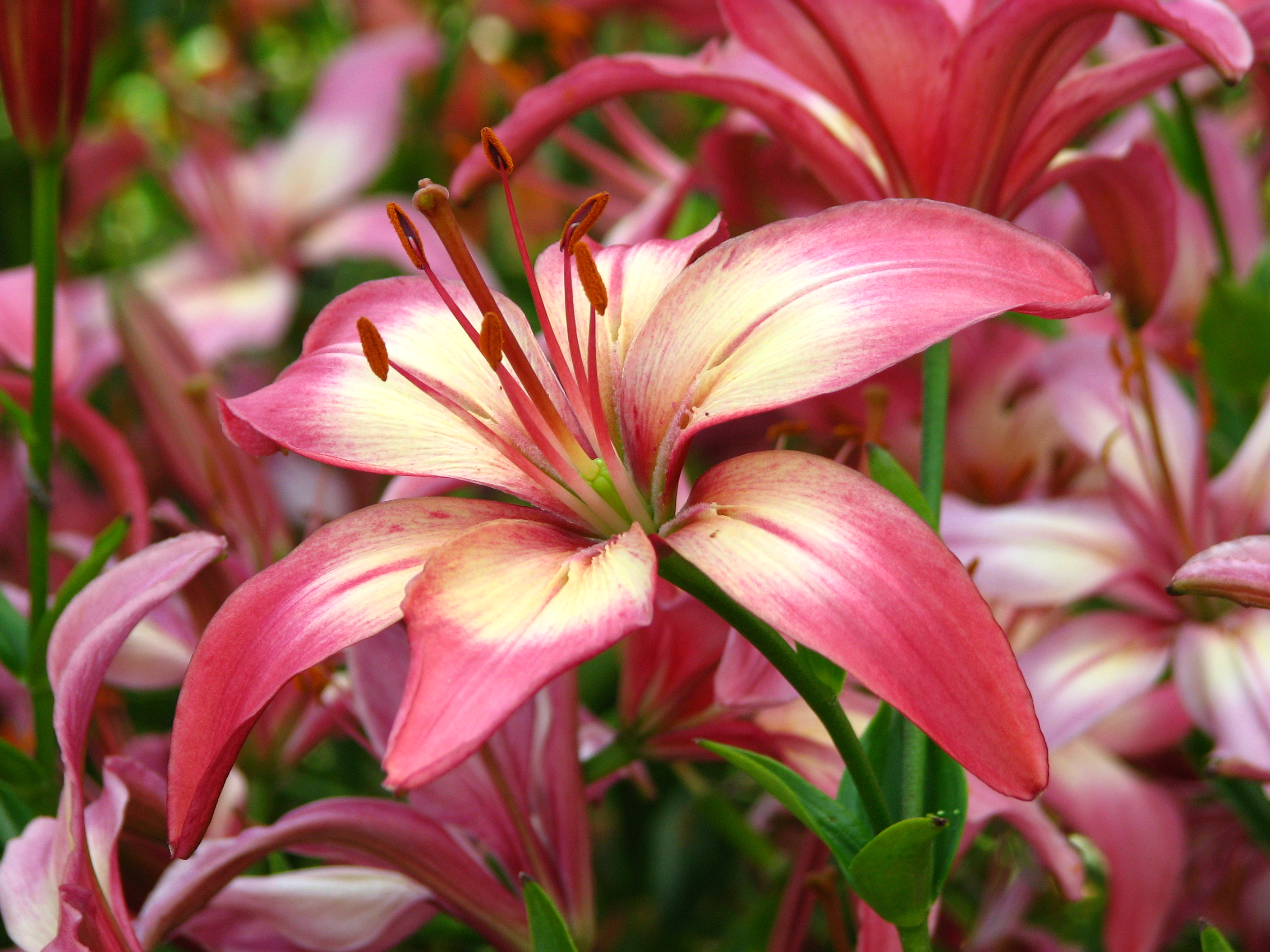

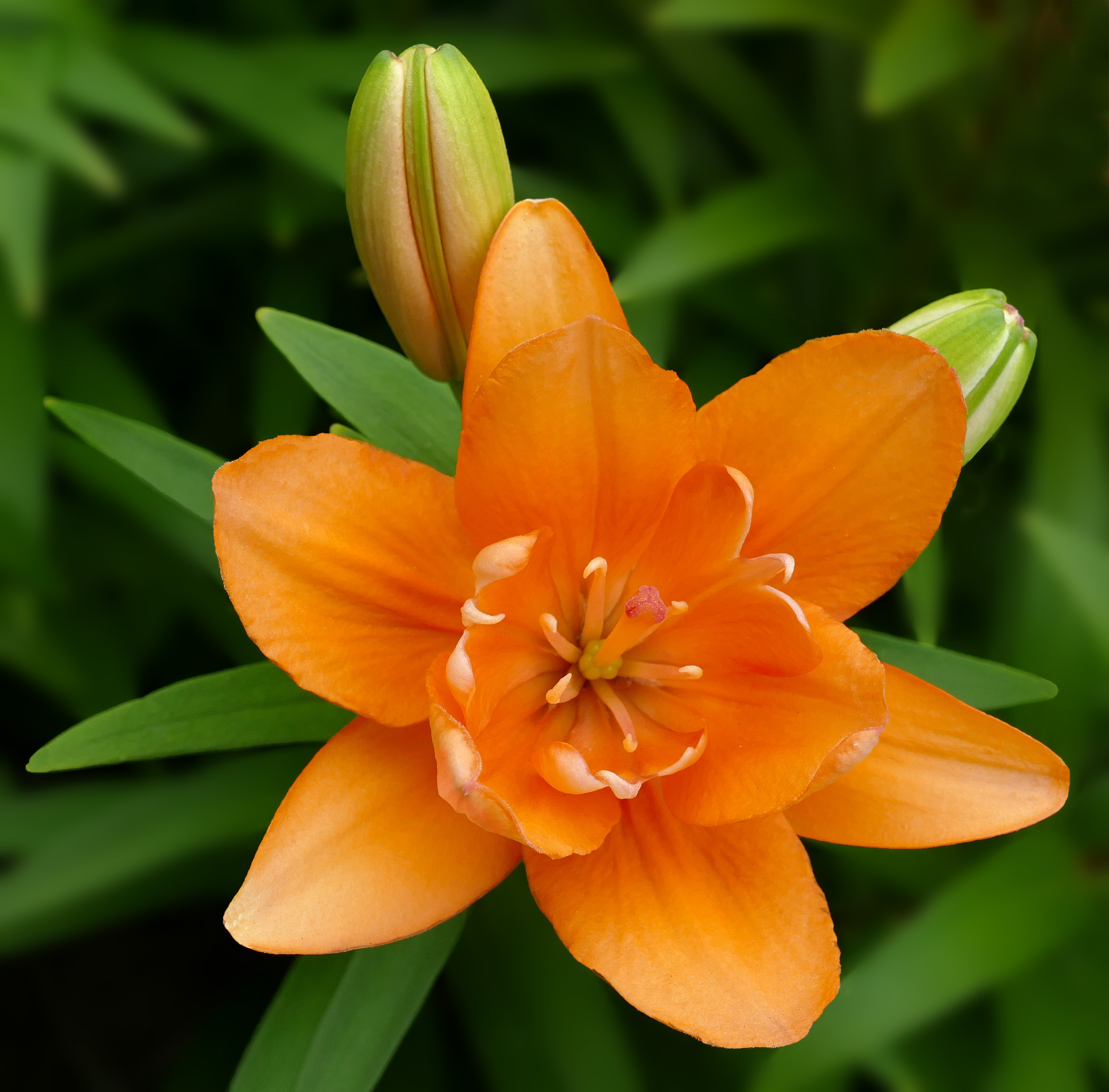

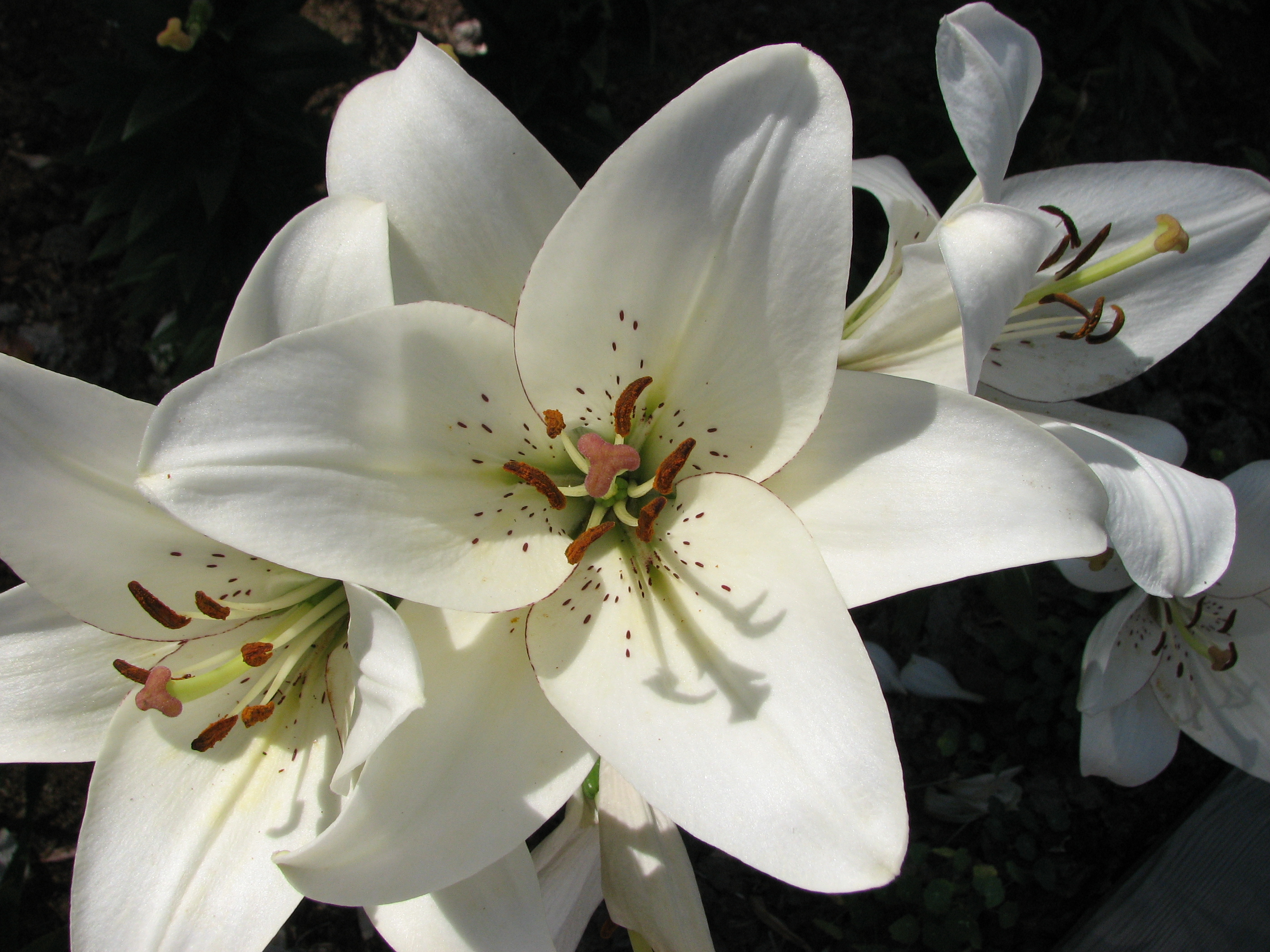

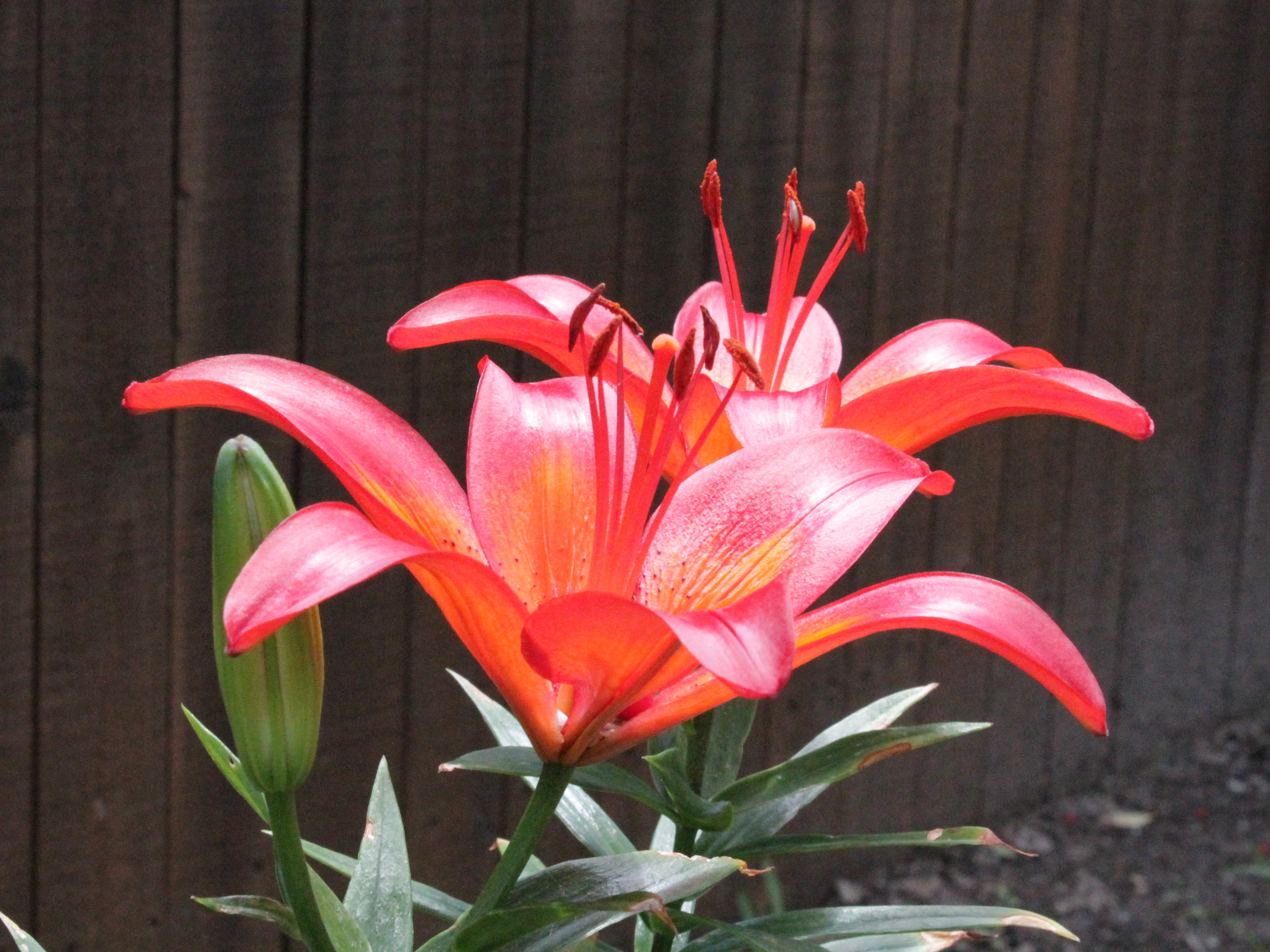

Includes all other garden hybrids.

==== Species (Division IX) ====
All natural species and naturally occurring forms are included in this group.

The flowers can be classified by flower aspect and form:

- Flower aspect:

- a up-facing
- b out-facing
- c down-facing

- Flower form:

- a trumpet-shaped
- b bowl-shaped
- c flat (or with tepal tips recurved)
- d tepals strongly recurved (with the Turk's cap form as the ultimate state)

Many newer commercial varieties are developed by using new technologies such as ovary culture and embryo rescue.

=== Pests and diseases ===
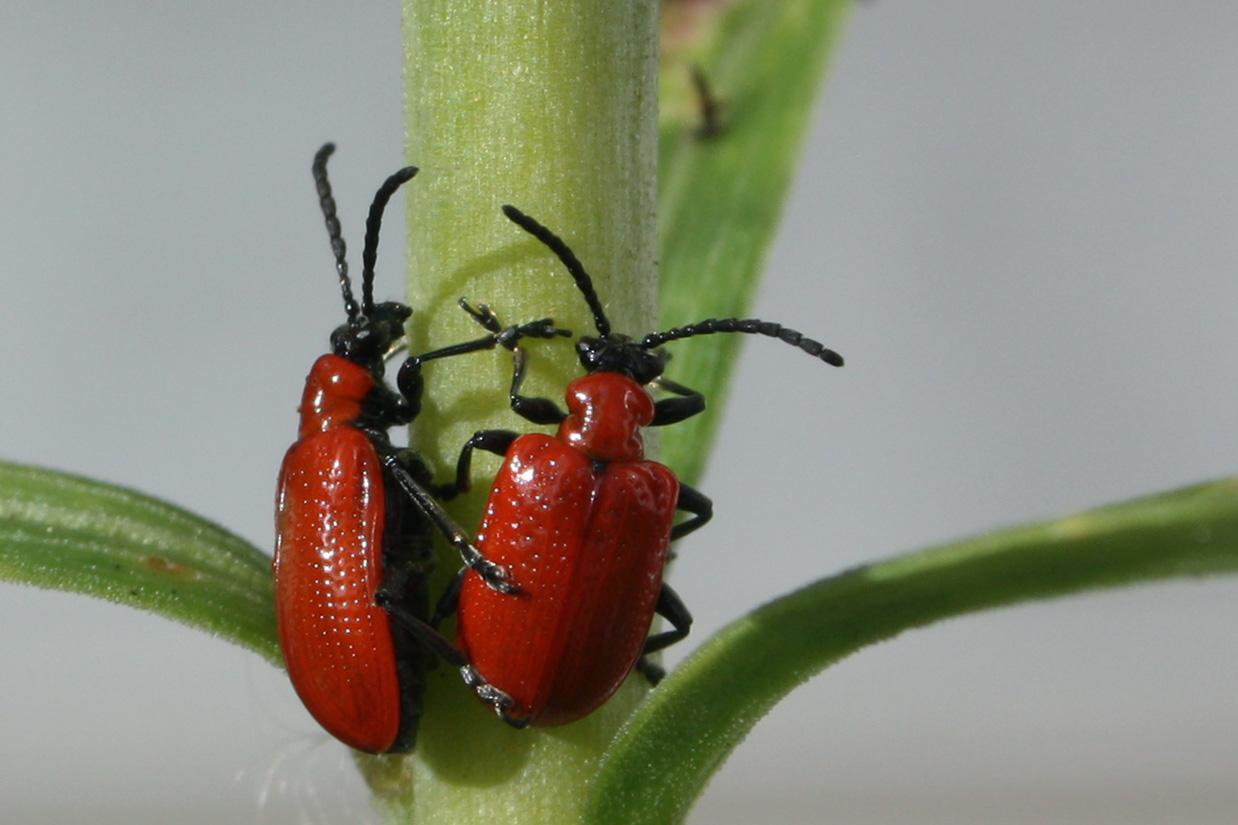
Scarlet lily beetles, Oxfordshire, UK

Aphids may infest plants. Leatherjackets feed on the roots. Larvae of the Scarlet lily beetle can cause serious damage to the stems and leaves. The scarlet beetle lays its eggs and completes its life cycle only on true lilies (Lilium) and fritillaries (Fritillaria). Oriental, rubrum, tiger and trumpet lilies as well as Oriental trumpets (orienpets) and Turk's cap lilies and native North American Lilium species are all vulnerable, but the beetle prefers some types over others. The beetle could also be having an effect on native Canadian species and some rare and endangered species found in northeastern North America. Daylilies (Hemerocallis, not true lilies) are excluded from this category. Plants can suffer from damage caused by mice, deer and squirrels. Slugs, snails and millipedes attack seedlings, leaves and flowers.

Brown spots on damp leaves may signal an infection of Botrytis elliptica, also known as Lily blight, lily fire, and botrytis leaf blight. Various viral diseases can cause mottling of leaves and stunting of growth, including lily curl stripe, ringspot, and lily rosette virus.

=== Propagation and growth ===
Lilies can be propagated in several ways;

- by division of the bulbs
- by growing-on bulbils which are adventitious bulbs formed on the stem
- by scaling, for which whole scales are detached from the bulb and planted to form a new bulb
- by seed; there are many seed germination patterns, which can be complex
- by micropropagation techniques (which include tissue culture); commercial quantities of lilies are often propagated in vitro and then planted out to grow into plants large enough to sell. A highly efficient technique for multiple shoot and propagule formation was given by Yadav et al., in 2013.

Plant grow regulators (PGRs) are used to limit the height of lilies, especially those sold as potted plants. Commonly used chemicals include ancymidol, fluprimidol, paclobutrazol, and uni-conazole, all of which are applied to the foliage to slow the biosynthesis of gibberellins, a class of plant hormones responsible for stem growth.

== Research ==
A comparison of meiotic crossing-over (recombination) in lily and mouse led, in 1977, to the conclusion that diverse eukaryotes share a common pattern of meiotic crossing-over. Lilium longiflorum has been used for studying aspects of the basic molecular mechanism of genetic recombination during meiosis.

== Toxicity ==
Some Lilium species are toxic to cats. This is known to be especially so for Lilium longiflorum, though other Lilium and the unrelated Hemerocallis can also cause the same symptoms with equal lethality. The true mechanism of toxicity is undetermined, but it involves damage to the renal tubular epithelium (composing the substance of the kidney and secreting, collecting, and conducting urine), which can cause acute kidney failure. Veterinary help should be sought, as a matter of urgency, for any cat that is suspected of eating any part of a lily – including licking pollen that may have brushed onto its coat. Due to the high mortality rate, medical care should be sought immediately once it is known a cat came into contact with lilies, ideally before any symptoms develop.

== Culinary uses ==
=== Chinese cuisine ===
Lily bulbs are starchy and edible as root vegetables, though bulbs of some species may be too bitter to eat.

Lilium brownii var. viridulum, known as 百合 (pak hop; pinyin: bǎi hé; Cantonese Yale: baak hap; lit. 'hundred lapping' after its bulb), is one of the most prominent edible lilies in China. Its bulbs are large in size and not bitter. They were even exported and sold in the San Francisco Chinatown in the 19th century, available both fresh and dry. A landrace called 龍牙百合 (pinyin: lóng yá bǎi hé; lit. 'dragon-tooth lily') mainly cultivated in Hunan and Jiangxi is especially renowned for its good-quality bulbs.

L. lancifolium (Chinese: 卷丹; pinyin: juǎn dān; lit. 'reflexed red') is widely cultivated in China, especially in Yixing, Huzhou and Longshan. Its bulbs are slightly bitter.

L. davidii var. unicolor (Chinese: 蘭州百合; lit. 'Lanzhou lily') is mainly cultivated in Lanzhou and its bulbs are valued for sweetness.

Other edible Chinese lilies include L. brownii var. brownii, L. davidii var. davidii, L. concolor, L. pensylvanicum, L. distichum, L. martagon var. pilosiusculum, L. pumilum, L. rosthornii and L. speciosum var. gloriosoides. Researchers have also explored the possibility of using ornamental cultivars as edible lilies. (Note: 'Batistero' and 'California' among 15 lilies in Beijing, and 'Prato' and 'Small foreigners' among 13 lilies in Ningbo.)

The dried bulbs are commonly used in the south to flavor soup. They may be reconstituted and stir-fried, grated and used to thicken soup, or processed to extract starch. Their texture and taste draw comparisons with the potato, although the individual bulb scales are much smaller.

The commonly marketed "lily" flower buds, called kam cham tsoi (Chinese: 金针菜; pinyin: jīnzhēncài; Cantonese Yale: gāmjām choi; lit. 'gold needle vegetable') in Chinese cuisine, are actually from daylilies, Hemerocallis citrina, or possibly H. fulva. (Note: Blasdale cites Bretschneider (1889), but in Bretschneider (1875), "Notes on Chinese Mediaeval Travellers to the West", p. 123, first gives the Chinese name for H. fulva as "kïm châm hōa" as according to João de Loureiro, while he himself only recognized its name as "kin huang hua" 金黃花 or as [黃花菜]; huang-hua ts'ai; 'yellow-flower vegetable' as they were called by Beijing merchants.) Flowers of the H. graminea and Lilium bulbiferum were reported to have been eaten as well, but samples provided by the informant were strictly daylilies and did not include L. bulbiferum. (Note: The informant, Pelham L. Warren, consul at Taiwan was presumably providing imports from China (main port Hankou) or Japan.)

Lily flowers and bulbs are eaten especially in the summer, for their perceived ability to reduce internal heat. A 19th century English source reported that "Lily flowers are also said to be efficacious in pulmonary affections, and to have tonic properties".

Asiatic lily cultivars are also imported from the Netherlands; the seedling bulbs must be imported from the Netherlands every year.

The parts of Lilium species which are officially listed as food material in Taiwan are the flower and bulbs of Lilium lancifolium, Lilium brownii var. viridulum, Lilium pumilum and Lilium candidum.

=== Japanese cuisine ===
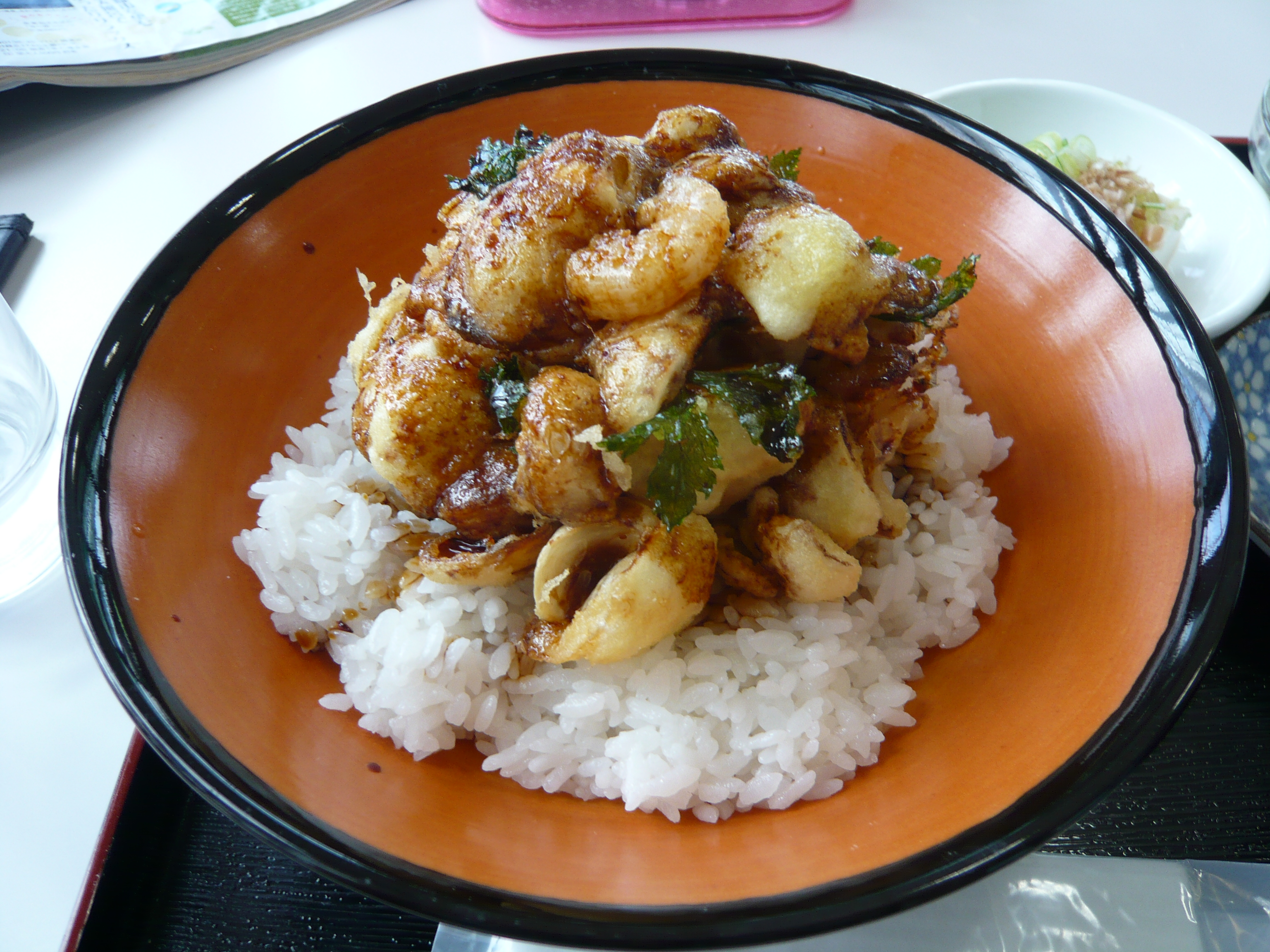
Loose scales of lily bulb in a donburi bowl dish

The lily bulb or yuri-ne is sometimes used in Japanese cuisine. (Note: "not a common food" (Shizuo Tsuji).) It may be most familiar in the present day as an occasional ingredient (具, gu) in the chawan-mushi (savoury egg custard), where a few loosened scales of this optional ingredient are found embedded in the "hot pudding" of each serving. It could also be used as an ingredient in a clear soup or suimono.

The boiled bulb may also be strained (Note: The term uragoshi "straining" orthodoxically means using the "uragoshi-ki", traditionally a sieve with a fine mesh of horse-hair instead of metal wire.) into purée for use, as in the sweetened kinton, or chakin-shibori. (Note: These could refer to essentially the same thing, except for slight difference in texture and appearance. The yuri-kinton has been described as "ogura an (sweet adzuki bean paste) core surrounded with stipples (soboro) of strained lily bulb and white adzuki (shiroazuki or shiroshōzu). A recipe for lily bulb dumplings or chakin-shibori calls for wrapping adzuki bean paste with lily bulb mashed into purée, then wrapping it in a cloth and wringing the dumpling into a ball shape.)

==== Yokan ====
There is also the yuri-yōkan, one recipe of which calls for combining measures of yuri starch with agar dissolved in water and sugar. This was a specialty of Hamada, Shimane, (Note: Allegedly the Hamada city version was 90% adulterated with white [Phaseolus vulgaris) and the shop Kaisei-dō (開盛堂) established in 1885 became famous for it. Because a certain Viscount Jimyōin wrote a waka poem about the confection which mentioned hime-yuri "princess lily", (Note: Jimyōin Motoaki b. 1865 was a viscount and poet. So was his son Motonori.) one source stated that the hime-yuri (usually taken to mean L. concolor) had to have been used, but another source points out that the city of Hamada lies back to back with across a mountain range with Fuchu, Hiroshima which is renowned for its production of yama-yuri (L. auratum). (Note: And as discussed below, this yama-yuri was also called "hime-yuri" in earlier days.)

==== Species used ====
Current Japanese governmental sources (c. 2005) list the following lily species as prominent in domestic consumption: (Note: Taira, Hirokazu et al. edd., (2006) Shokuhin zukan, KNU Publishing (女子栄養大学, Joshi Eiyō Daigaku). apud MAFF consumer bureau Q&A. Cf. KNU Prof. Gomyo's online encyclopedia.) the oni yuri or tiger lily Lilium lancifolium, the kooni yuri Lilium leichtlinii var. maximowiczii, (Note: The kooni yuri (小鬼百合; "lesser ogre lily").) and the gold-banded white yama-yuri L. auratum.

But Japanese sources c. 1895–1900, give a top-three list which replaces kooni yuri with the sukashi-yuri (透かし百合; lit. "see-through lily", L. maculatum) named from the gaps between the tepals. (Note: This species was particularly sought after by high-end kappo (割烹) restaurants, for braising it whole. Shin shikunshi (1901), p. 75.)

There is uncertainty regarding which species is meant by the hime-yuri used as food, because although this is usually the common name for L. concolor in most up-to-date literature, it used to ambiguously referred to the tiger lily as well, c. 1895–1900. The non-tiger-lily himeyuri is certainly described as quite palatable in the literature at the time, but the extent of exploitation could not have been as significant. (Note: That is, not in the top three of this period.)

=== North America ===
The flower buds and roots of Lilium columbianum are traditionally gathered and eaten by North American indigenous peoples. Coast Salish, Nuu-chah-nulth and most western Washington peoples steam, boil or pit-cook the bulbs of Lilium columbianum. Bitter or peppery-tasting, they were mostly used as a flavoring, often in soup with meat or fish.

== Medicinal uses ==
Traditional Chinese medicine list the use of the following: 野百合 Lilium brownii, 百合 Lilium brownii var. viridulum, 渥丹 Lilium concolor, 毛百合 Lilium dauricum, 卷丹 Lilium lancifolium, 山丹 Lilium pumilum, 南川百合 Lilium rosthornii, 药百合Lilium speciosum var. gloriosoides, 淡黄花百合 Lilium sulphureum.

In Taiwan, governmental publications list Lilium lancifolium Thunb., Lilium brownii var. viridulum Baker, Lilium pumilum DC.

In the kanpō or Chinese medicine as practiced in Japan, the official Japanese governmental pharmacopeia Nihon yakkyokuhō (日本薬局方) includes the use of lily bulb (known as byakugō (ビャクゴウ 百合) in traditional pharmacological circles), listing the use of the following species: Lilium lancifolium, Lilium brownii, Lilium brownii var. colchesteri, Lilium pumilum The scales flaked off from the bulbs are used, usually steamed.

In South Korea, the lilium species which are officially listed for medicinal use are 참나리 Lilium lancifolium Thunberg; 당나리 Lilium brownii var. viridulun Baker.

== In culture ==
=== Symbolism ===
In the Victorian language of flowers, lilies portray love, ardor, and affection for one's loved ones, while orange lilies stand for happiness, love, and warmth.

White lilies have been used since the Romantic era of Japanese literature to symbolize beauty and purity in women, and are a de facto symbol of the yuri genre describing the portrayal of intimate love, sex, or emotional connections between women named after the lily itself (百合 yuri). This connection was first made in 1976 through the term Yurizoku (百合族; lit. "lily tribe") coined by Ito Bungaku, editor of the gay men's magazine Barazoku, to refer to his female readers. While not all those women were lesbians themselves, and it is unclear whether this was the first instance of the term yuri in this context, an association of yuri with lesbianism subsequently developed. In Korea and the Sinosphere, the Sinitic readings of the Chinese phrase 百合 (as explained above) have been taken as semantic loans from the Japanese usage (also readopted in the case of the latter) to describe media about female-female romance – 백합 baekhap in Korea and bǎihé (百合) in Mandarin-speaking areas of Taiwan and China.

Lilies are the flowers most commonly used at funerals, where they symbolically signify that the soul of the deceased has been restored to the state of innocence.

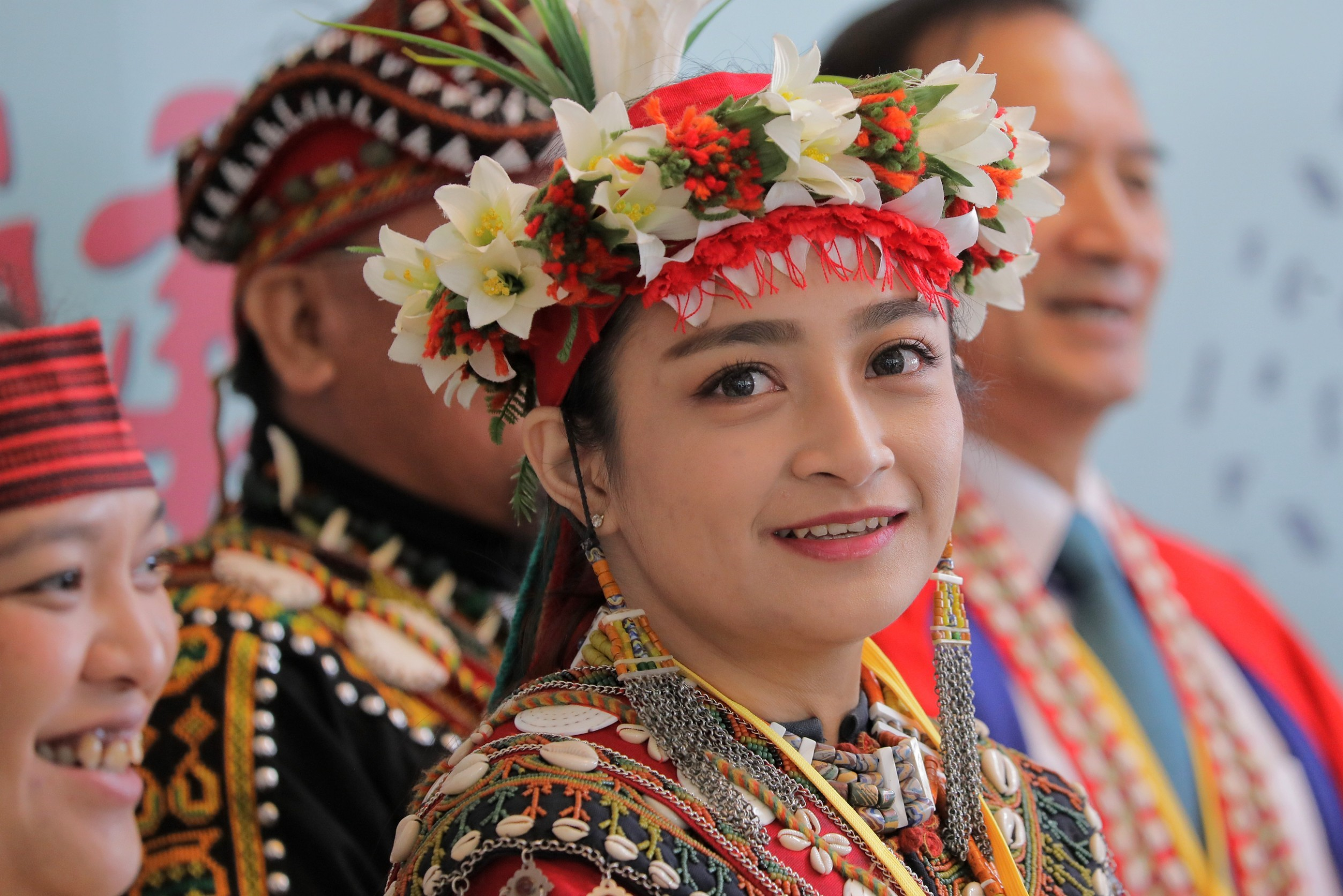
A Rukai lady adorned with Formosan lilies at a function in Taiwan

Lilium formosanum, or Taiwanese lily, is called "the flower of broken bowl" (Chinese: 打碗花) by the elderly members of the Hakka ethnic group. They believe that because this lily grows near bodies of clean water, harming the lily may damage the environment, just like breaking the bowls that people rely on. A different viewpoint proposes that parents discourage kids from picking lilies by informing them of the possible repercussions, like their dinner bowls breaking if they harm the flower. The indigenous Rukai people who call this same species bariangalay consider it as a symbol of bravery and perseverance.

In Western Christianity, Madonna lily or Lilium candidum has been associated with the Virgin Mary since at least the Medieval Era. Medieval and Renaissance depictions of the Virgin Mary, especially at the Annunciation, often show her with these flowers. Madonna lilies are also commonly included in depictions of Christ's resurrection. Lilium longiflorum, the Easter lily, is a symbol of Easter, and Lilium candidum, the Madonna lily, carries a great deal of symbolic value in many cultures. See the articles for more information.

In Ancient Minoan Crete and Cyclades cultures, lilies are depicted associated with an unknown religious meaning. The crown from the "Priest-King" fresco at Knossos is covered with white lilies while a depiction of a shrine in the Xesté 3 house Akrotiri is covered in red lilies.

=== Heraldry ===
Lilium bulbiferum has long been recognised as a symbol of the Orange Order in Northern Ireland.

Lilium mackliniae is the state flower of Manipur. Lilium michauxii, the Carolina lily, is the official state flower of North Carolina. Idyllwild, California, hosts the Lemon Lily Festival, which celebrates Lilium parryi. Lilium philadelphicum is the floral emblem of Saskatchewan province in Canada, and is on the flag of Saskatchewan.

=== Other plants referred to as lilies ===
Lily of the valley, flame lilies, daylilies, water lilies and spider lilies are symbolically important flowers commonly referred to as lilies, but they are not in the genus Lilium.

== See also ==
- Lily seed germination types
- List of plants known as lily
