= Yellow star-of-Bethlehem =

Common name for plant species

Yellow star-of-Bethlehem is a common name for several plants and may refer to:

- Gagea lutea, a Eurasian flowering plant species in the family Liliaceae
- Gagea pratensis, a European and Mediterranean plant species in the lily family
