= Gagea ramulosa =

Scientific classification
- Kingdom: Plantae
- Clade: Tracheophytes
- Clade: Angiosperms
- Clade: Monocots
- Order: Liliales
- Family: Liliaceae
- Subfamily: Lilioideae
- Genus: Gagea
- Species: G. ramulosa

Binomial name
- Gagea ramulosa A.Terracc.

Species of flowering plant

Gagea ramulosa is a Eurasian and North African plant species in the lily family. It is native to France, Sardinia, Sicily, Greece, Turkey, Libya, Ukraine, European Russia, Caucasus, Syria, Lebanon, Iraq, Iran, and Afghanistan. Some authors consider this to be the same species as G. dubia, but the World Checklist does have it listed as a distinct species.

Gagea ramulosa is a bulb-forming perennial herb. Flowers are yellow.
