= Gagea antakiensis =

Conservation status
- Critically Endangered (IUCN 3.1)

Scientific classification
- Kingdom: Plantae
- Clade: Tracheophytes
- Clade: Angiosperms
- Clade: Monocots
- Order: Liliales
- Family: Liliaceae
- Subfamily: Lilioideae
- Tribe: Lilieae
- Genus: Gagea
- Species: G. antakiensis

Binomial name
- Gagea antakiensis Kayikçi, Ocak & Teksen

Species of plant

Gagea antakiensis, commonly known as the Antakya gagea, is a flowering plant in the family Liliaceae. It is endemic to Turkey. It is classified as critically endangered by the International Union for Conservation of Nature.

== Distribution ==
It is found in Turkey.

== Taxonomy ==
It was described by Nermin Kayikci, Atila Ocak and Mehtap Tekşen in: Phytotaxa 170: 270 in 2014.
