= Gagea chinensis =

Scientific classification
- Kingdom: Plantae
- Clade: Embryophytes
- Clade: Tracheophytes
- Clade: Spermatophytes
- Clade: Angiosperms
- Clade: Monocots
- Order: Liliales
- Family: Liliaceae
- Subfamily: Lilioideae
- Genus: Gagea
- Species: G. chinensis

Binomial name
- Gagea chinensis Y.Z.Zhao & L.Q.Zhao

Species of flowering plant

Gagea chinensis is a Chinese species of plants in the lily family, found only in the Inner Mongolia (Nei Mongol) region of China.
