= Gagea lojaconoi =

Scientific classification
- Kingdom: Plantae
- Clade: Embryophytes
- Clade: Tracheophytes
- Clade: Spermatophytes
- Clade: Angiosperms
- Clade: Monocots
- Order: Liliales
- Family: Liliaceae
- Subfamily: Lilioideae
- Genus: Gagea
- Species: G. lojaconoi

Binomial name
- Gagea lojaconoi (Parl.) Parl.

Synonyms
- Gagea longifolia Lojac 1909, illegitimate homonym not Gand. 1876

Species of flowering plant

Gagea lojaconoi is a Mediterranean and Black Sea species of plants in the lily family. It is native to Sardinia, Sicily, and Turkey.

Gagea lojaconoi is a bulb-forming herb with yellow flowers and green or red stems.

The species is named for Italian botanist Michele Lojacono Pojero (1853–1919).
