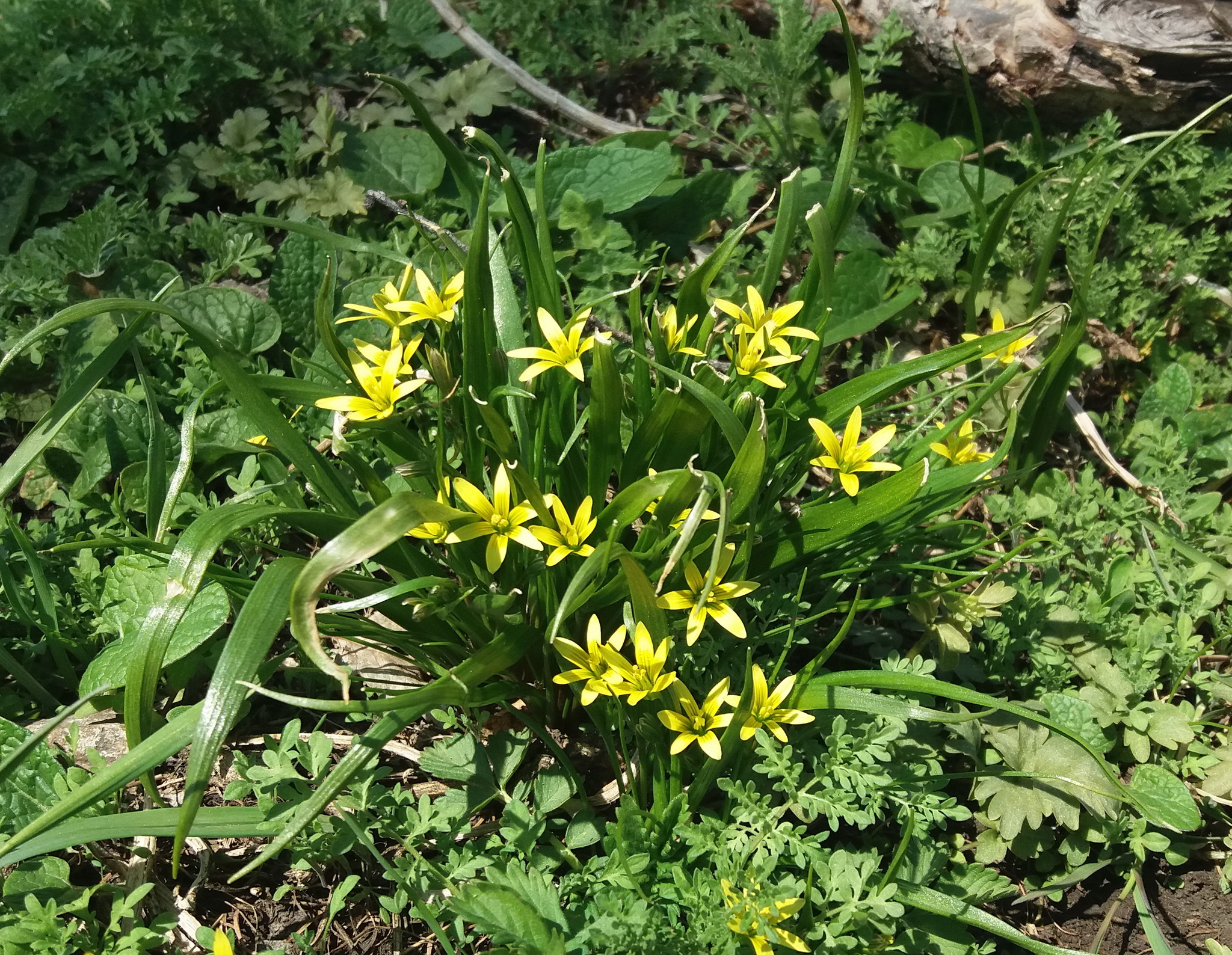

Scientific classification
- Kingdom: Plantae
- Clade: Embryophytes
- Clade: Tracheophytes
- Clade: Spermatophytes
- Clade: Angiosperms
- Clade: Monocots
- Order: Liliales
- Family: Liliaceae
- Subfamily: Lilioideae
- Genus: Gagea
- Species: G. granulosa

Binomial name
- Gagea granulosa Turcz.

Synonyms
- Gagea granulosa var. elatior Pascher

= Gagea granulosa =

Species of flowering plant

Gagea granulosa is a Eurasian species of plants in the lily family. It is native to Russia (European Russia and Siberia), Kazakhstan, China (Xinjiang), and Mongolia.

Gagea granulosa is a bulb-forming perennial up to 20 cm (7.9 in) tall. Flowers are yellow to yellow-green.
