= Gagea trinervia =

Scientific classification
- Kingdom: Plantae
- Clade: Embryophytes
- Clade: Tracheophytes
- Clade: Spermatophytes
- Clade: Angiosperms
- Clade: Monocots
- Order: Liliales
- Family: Liliaceae
- Subfamily: Lilioideae
- Genus: Gagea
- Species: G. trinervia

Binomial name
- Gagea trinervia (Viv.) Greuter

Synonyms
- Anthericum trinervium Viv.; Lloydia trinervia (Viv.) Coss.; Gagea graeca subsp. trinervia (Viv.) A.Terracc.; Lloydia graeca subsp. trinervia (Viv.) Maire & Weiller

Species of flowering plant

Gagea trinervia is a Mediterranean species of small bulbous perennial plants lily family. It is found only on the Island of Sicily and in the northeastern part of Libya.
