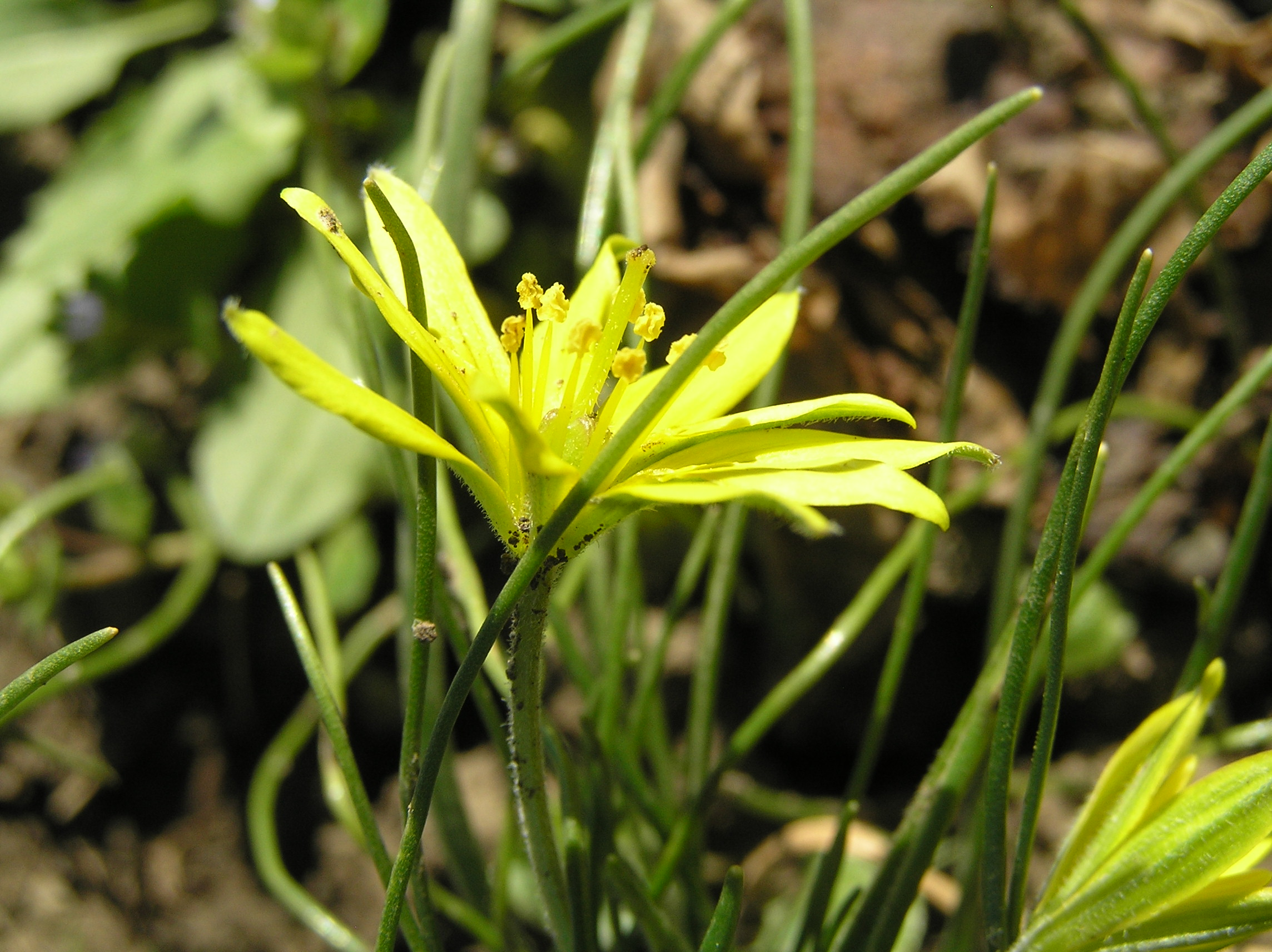

Scientific classification
- Kingdom: Plantae
- Clade: Embryophytes
- Clade: Tracheophytes
- Clade: Spermatophytes
- Clade: Angiosperms
- Clade: Monocots
- Order: Liliales
- Family: Liliaceae
- Subfamily: Lilioideae
- Genus: Gagea
- Species: G. villosa

Binomial name
- Gagea villosa (M.Bieb.) Duby

Synonyms
- Ornithogalum villosum M.Bieb.; Ornithoxanthum villosum (M.Bieb.) Link

= Gagea villosa =

Hairy star of Bethlehem

Species of flowering plant

Gagea villosa, common name hairy star of Bethlehem, is a Eurasian and North African plant species in the lily family.

Gagea villosa is found in Europe, North Africa and Western Asia. Its range extends from Spain and Morocco east to Russia and Iran, and as far north as Sweden. It was first described to science by Bieberstein in 1808.
