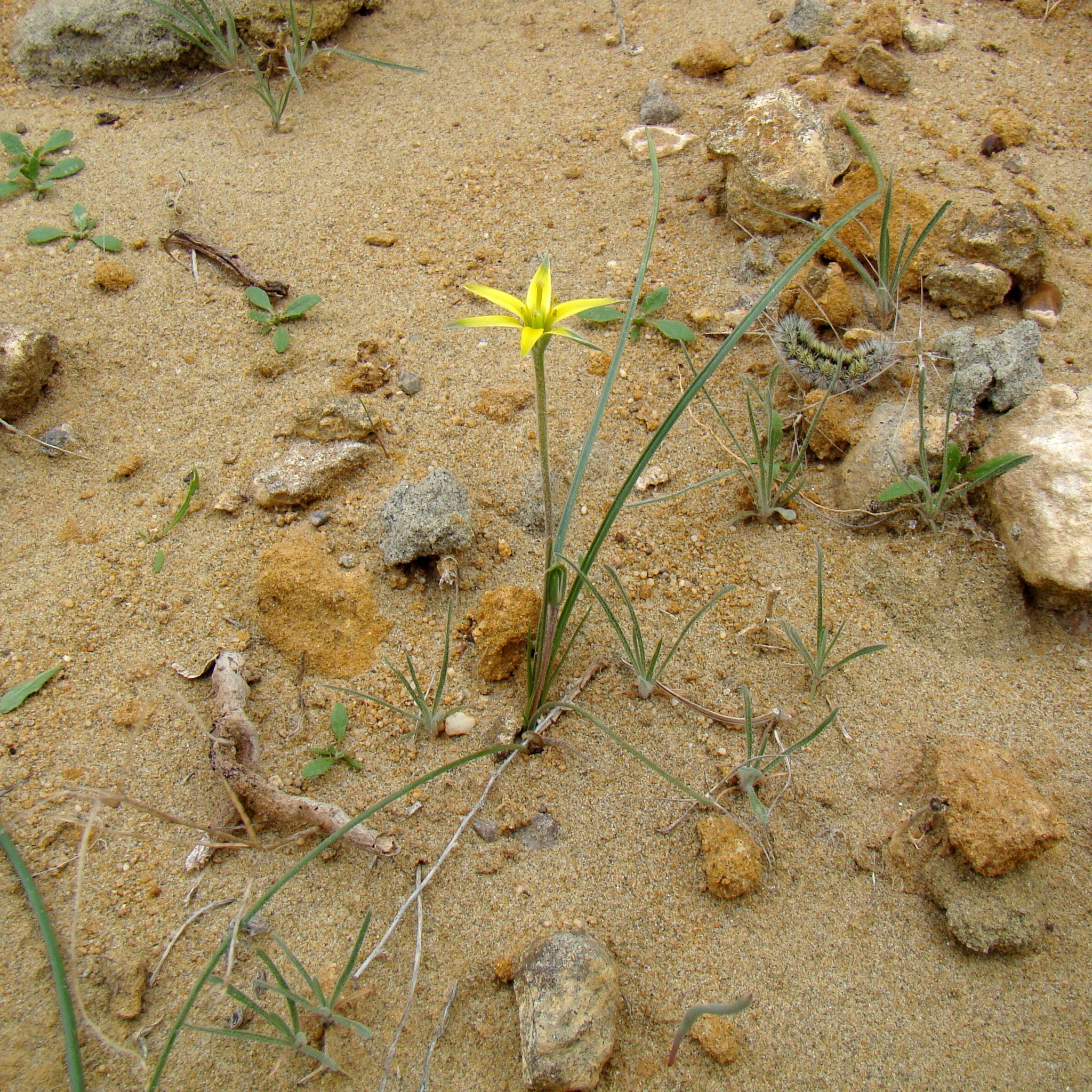
- In Kazakhstan

Scientific classification
- Kingdom: Plantae
- Clade: Embryophytes
- Clade: Tracheophytes
- Clade: Spermatophytes
- Clade: Angiosperms
- Clade: Monocots
- Order: Liliales
- Family: Liliaceae
- Subfamily: Lilioideae
- Genus: Gagea
- Species: G. divaricata

Binomial name
- Gagea divaricata Regel

= Gagea divaricata =

Species of flowering plant

Gagea divaricata is an Asian species of plants in the lily family, native to Kazakhstan, Kyrgyzstan, Tajikistan, Uzbekistan, and Xinjiang Province of western China.

Gagea divaricata is a bulb-forming perennial up to 5 cm (2.0 in) tall. Flowers are yellow with a green stripe on the backside of each tepal.
