= Gagea olgae =

Scientific classification
- Kingdom: Plantae
- Clade: Embryophytes
- Clade: Tracheophytes
- Clade: Spermatophytes
- Clade: Angiosperms
- Clade: Monocots
- Order: Liliales
- Family: Liliaceae
- Subfamily: Lilioideae
- Genus: Gagea
- Species: G. olgae

Binomial name
- Gagea olgae Regel

Synonyms
- Gagea olgae f. dilatata Levichev

Species of flowering plant

Gagea olgae is an Asian species of plants in the lily family. It is native to Iran, Pakistan, Afghanistan, Kyrgyzstan, Tajikistan, Uzbekistan, Kazakhstan, and Xinjiang.

Gagea olgae is a bulb-forming perennial up to 6 cm (2.4 in) tall. Flowers look yellow from the front, dark purple from the rear.

The species is named for plant collector Olga Fedschenko.
