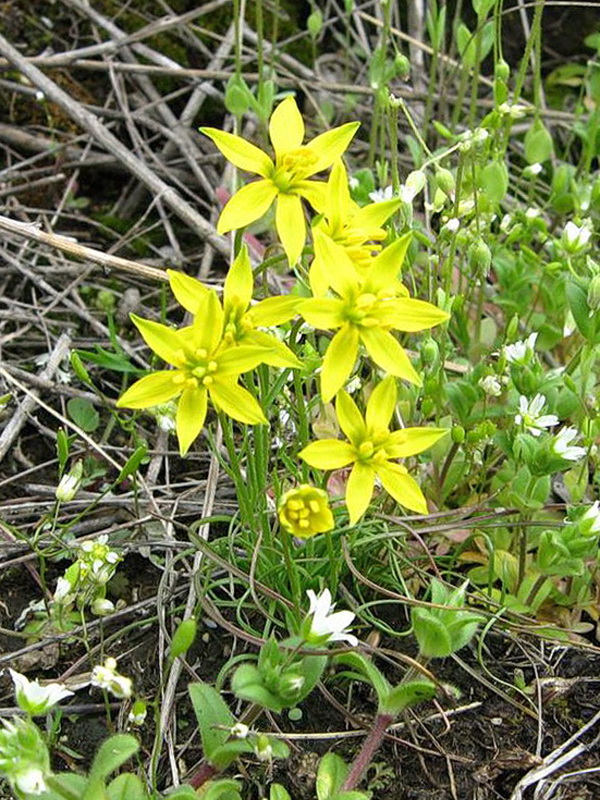

Scientific classification
- Kingdom: Plantae
- Clade: Embryophytes
- Clade: Tracheophytes
- Clade: Spermatophytes
- Clade: Angiosperms
- Clade: Monocots
- Order: Liliales
- Family: Liliaceae
- Subfamily: Lilioideae
- Genus: Gagea
- Species: G. bulbifera

Binomial name
- Gagea bulbifera (Pall.) Salisb.

Synonyms
- Ornithogalum bulbiferum Pall. 1773; Gagea polyphylla Steven; Stellaster bulbifer (Pall.) Kuntze; Hornungia bulbifera (Pall.) Rouy

= Gagea bulbifera =

Species of flowering plant

Gagea bulbifera is a Eurasian species of plants in the lily family, widespread from Romania to Xinjiang. It is native to Romania, Russia (North Caucasus, West Siberia Krai, Altay Krai), South Caucasus, Kazakhstan, Kyrgyzstan, Iran, Turkey, Xinjiang, Western Himalayas.

Gagea bulbifera is a bulb-forming perennial up to 60 cm (24 in) tall. Flowers are yellow with green on the backs of each of the tepals.
