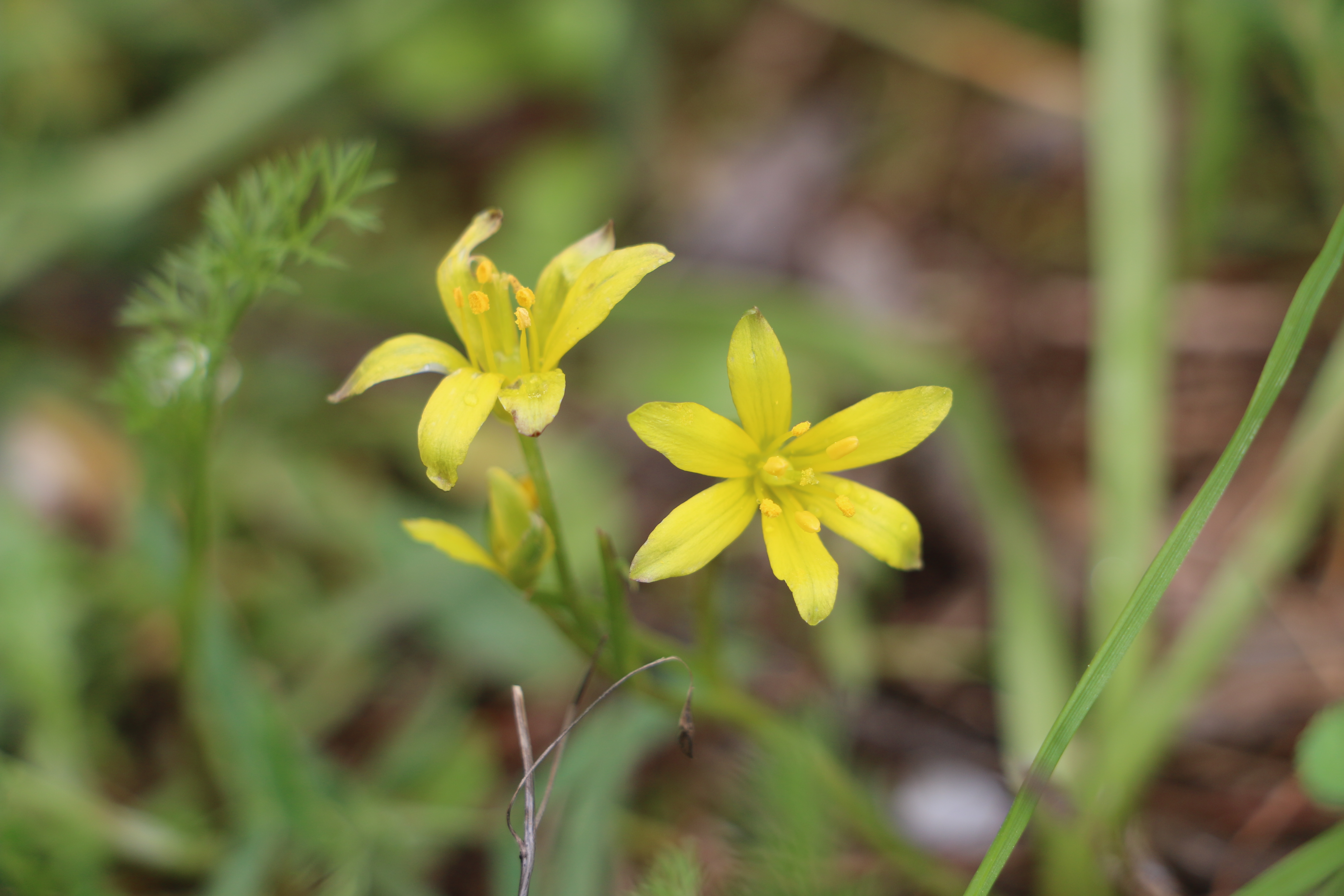

Scientific classification
- Kingdom: Plantae
- Clade: Embryophytes
- Clade: Tracheophytes
- Clade: Spermatophytes
- Clade: Angiosperms
- Clade: Monocots
- Order: Liliales
- Family: Liliaceae
- Subfamily: Lilioideae
- Genus: Gagea
- Species: G. lacaitae

Binomial name
- Gagea lacaitae (Parl.) Parl.

Synonyms
- Gagea granatellii var. boveana A.Terracc.; Gagea granatellii var. bulbillifera A.Terracc.

= Gagea lacaitae =

Species of flowering plant

Gagea lacaitae is a Mediterranean and Black Sea species of plants in the lily family. It is native to Spain incl. Balearic Islands, France incl. Corsica, Italy (Abruzzo + Sicily), Morocco, and Algeria.

Gagea lacaitae is a bulb-forming herb with yellow flowers.

The species is named for British botanist and politician Charles Carmichael Lacaita, 1853–1933.
