= Gagea flavonutans =

Scientific classification
- Kingdom: Plantae
- Clade: Embryophytes
- Clade: Tracheophytes
- Clade: Spermatophytes
- Clade: Angiosperms
- Clade: Monocots
- Order: Liliales
- Family: Liliaceae
- Subfamily: Lilioideae
- Genus: Gagea
- Species: G. flavonutans

Binomial name
- Gagea flavonutans (H.Hara) Zarrei & Wilkin

Synonyms
- Lloydia flavonutans H.Hara

Species of flowering plant

Gagea flavonutans is an Asian species of plants in the lily family, native to Tibet, Nepal, Sikkim, Bhutan, and Assam.

Gagea flavonutans is a bulb-forming perennial up to 25 cm (9.8 in) tall. Flowers are yellow with purple veins. It grows in thickets and meadows at elevations of 4,000–5,000 m (13,000–16,000 ft).
