= Gagea fedtschenkoana =

Scientific classification
- Kingdom: Plantae
- Clade: Tracheophytes
- Clade: Angiosperms
- Clade: Monocots
- Order: Liliales
- Family: Liliaceae
- Subfamily: Lilioideae
- Genus: Gagea
- Species: G. fedtschenkoana

Binomial name
- Gagea fedtschenkoana Pascher

Species of flowering plant

Gagea fedtschenkoana is an Asian species of plants in the lily family, native to Russia (Tuva, Altay Krai, Western Siberia Krai, Krasnoyarsk), China (Xinjiang), Kazakhstan, and Mongolia.

Gagea fedtschenkoana is a bulb-forming perennial up to 10 cm (3.9 in) tall. Flowers are yellow tinged with green or purple.
