= Gagea sicula =

Scientific classification
- Kingdom: Plantae
- Clade: Embryophytes
- Clade: Tracheophytes
- Clade: Spermatophytes
- Clade: Angiosperms
- Clade: Monocots
- Order: Liliales
- Family: Liliaceae
- Subfamily: Lilioideae
- Genus: Gagea
- Species: G. sicula

Binomial name
- Gagea sicula Lojac.

Synonyms
- Gagea amblyopetala var. calabra N.Terracc.

Species of flowering plant

Gagea sicula is an Italian flowering plant of the lily family. It has been found only on the Island of Sicily.
