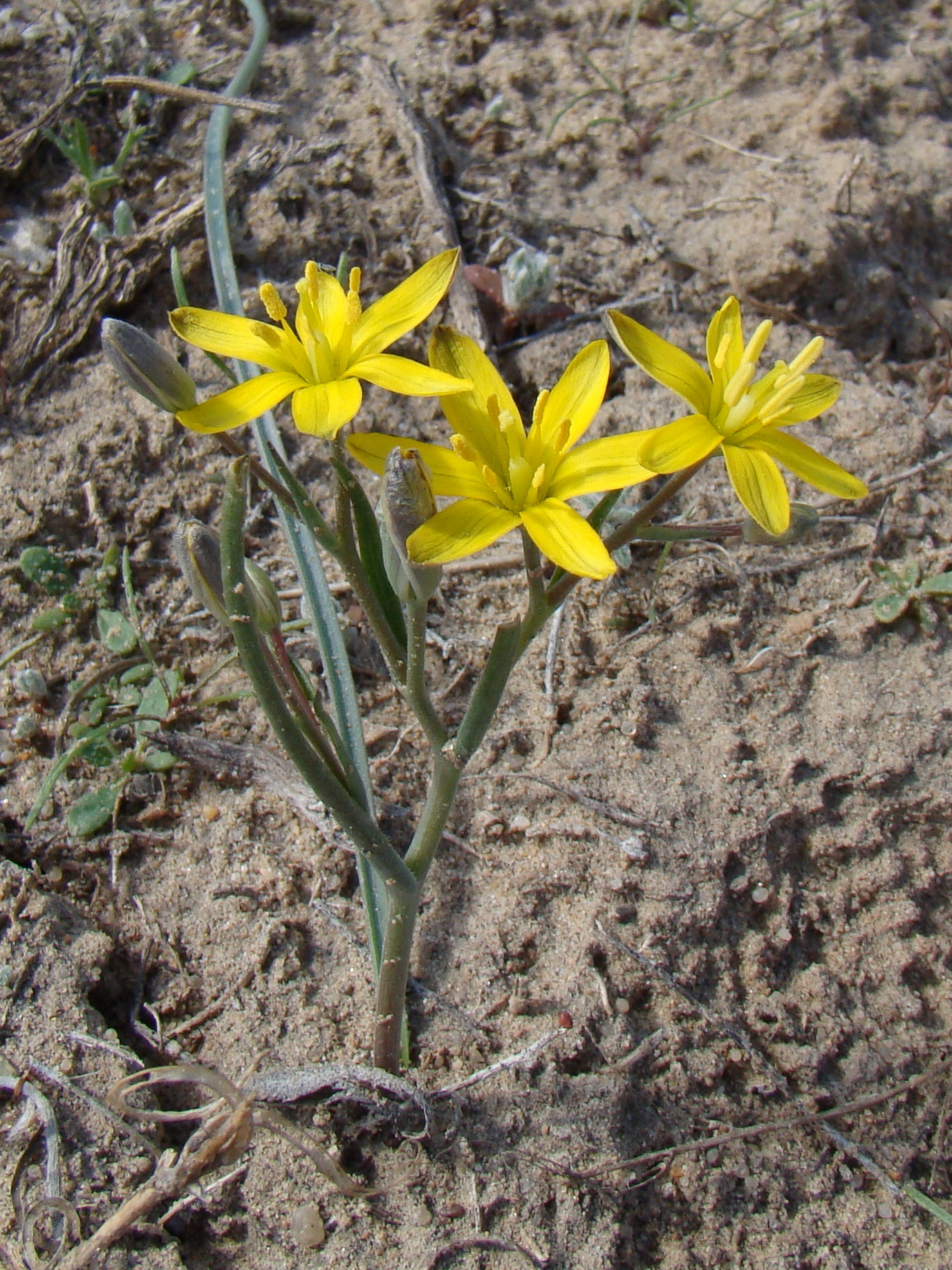
- In Kazakhstan

Scientific classification
- Kingdom: Plantae
- Clade: Embryophytes
- Clade: Tracheophytes
- Clade: Spermatophytes
- Clade: Angiosperms
- Clade: Monocots
- Order: Liliales
- Family: Liliaceae
- Subfamily: Lilioideae
- Genus: Gagea
- Species: G. altaica

Binomial name
- Gagea altaica Schischk. & Sumnev.

= Gagea altaica =

Species of flowering plant

Gagea altaica is an Asian species of plants in the lily family, native to Kazakhstan, Siberia (Tuva, Altay Krai, Krasnoyarsk), and Xinjiang Province of western China.

Gagea altaica is a bulb-forming perennial that grows up to 12 cm (4.7 in) tall. The flowers are golden yellow to yellow-brown, usually giving only one or two flowers per plant but sometimes more.
