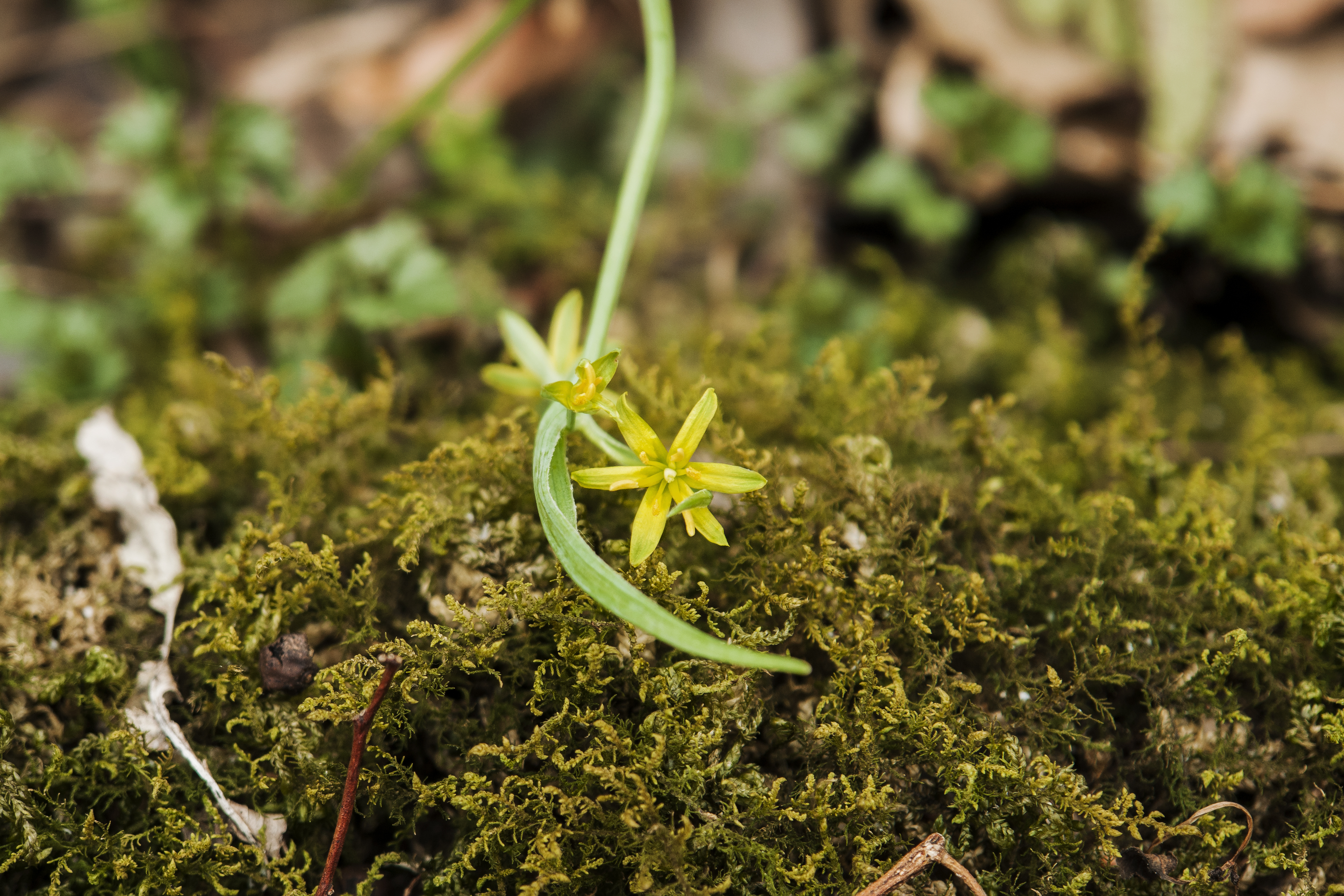

Scientific classification
- Kingdom: Plantae
- Clade: Embryophytes
- Clade: Tracheophytes
- Clade: Spermatophytes
- Clade: Angiosperms
- Clade: Monocots
- Order: Liliales
- Family: Liliaceae
- Subfamily: Lilioideae
- Genus: Gagea
- Species: G. hiensis

Binomial name
- Gagea hiensis Pascher

Synonyms
- Gagea terraccianoana Pascher

= Gagea hiensis =

Species of flowering plant

Gagea hiensis is a species of flowering plant in the lily family. It is native to Korea, Mongolia, China (Gansu, Hebei, Heilongjiang, Jilin, Liaoning, Qinghai, Shaanxi, Shanxi), and Far Eastern Russia (Amur Oblast, Khabarovsk, Primorye, Kuril Islands, Zabaykalsky Krai).

Gagea hiensis is a bulb-forming perennial up to 20 cm (7.9 in) tall. Flowers are yellow to yellow-green.
