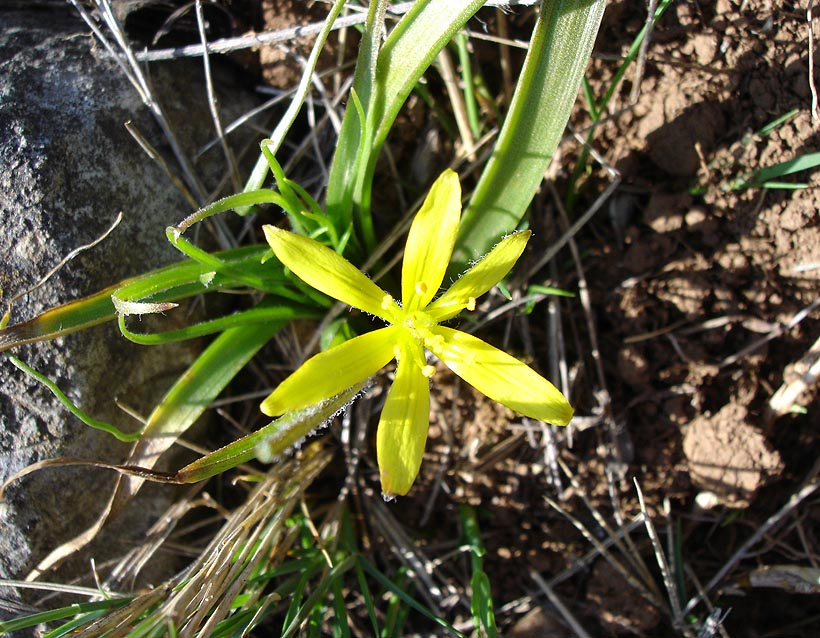
- Found in Libya

Scientific classification
- Kingdom: Plantae
- Clade: Embryophytes
- Clade: Tracheophytes
- Clade: Spermatophytes
- Clade: Angiosperms
- Clade: Monocots
- Order: Liliales
- Family: Liliaceae
- Subfamily: Lilioideae
- Genus: Gagea
- Species: G. granatellii

Binomial name
- Gagea granatellii (Parl.) Parl.

Synonyms
- Ornithogalum granatellii Parl.; Gagea litoralis Artemczuk; Stellaster granatellii (Parl.) Kuntze

= Gagea granatellii =

Species of flowering plant

Gagea granatellii is a Mediterranean and Black Sea species of plants in the lily family. It is native to Spain incl. Balearic Islands, France incl. Corsica, Italy (incl Sardinia + Sicily), Libya, Greece, Romania, and Crimea.

Gagea granatellii is a bulb-forming herb with yellow flowers and red stems.
