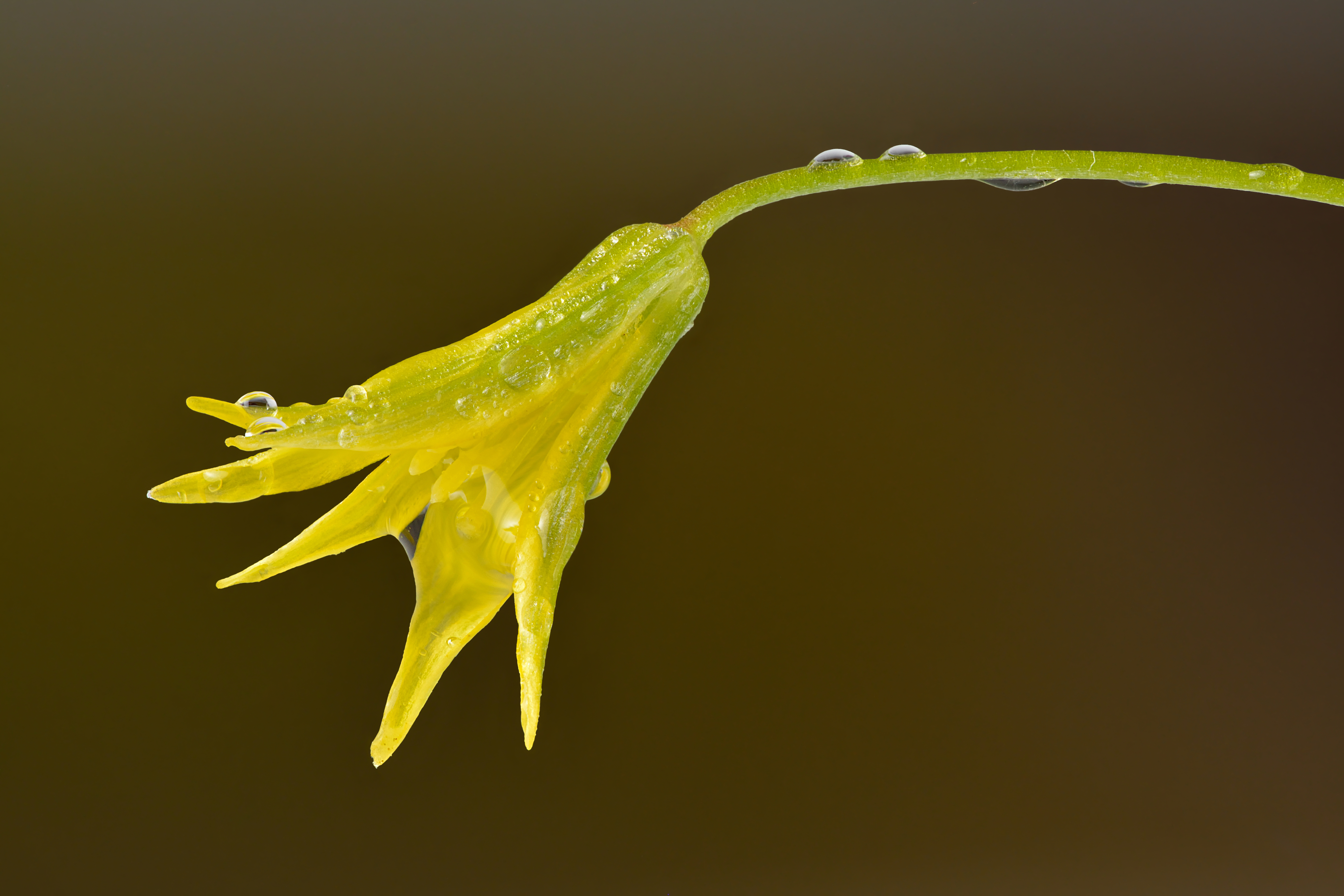

Scientific classification
- Kingdom: Plantae
- Clade: Embryophytes
- Clade: Tracheophytes
- Clade: Spermatophytes
- Clade: Angiosperms
- Clade: Monocots
- Order: Liliales
- Family: Liliaceae
- Subfamily: Lilioideae
- Genus: Gagea
- Species: G. minima

Binomial name
- Gagea minima (L.) Ker Gawl.

Synonyms
- Synonymy: Ornithogalum minimum L. (basionym); Ornithogalum arvense Pers.; Stellaris minima (L.) Moench; Gagea stellaris Salisb.; Gagea arvensis (Pers.) Dumort.; [Ornithoxanthum arvense (Pers.) Link; Ornithoxanthum minimum (L.) Link; Stellaster arvensis (Pers.) Kuntze; Stellaster minimus (L.) Kuntze; Ornithogalum minutum Pall.; Ornithogalum pannonicum Chaix ex Vill.; Ornithogalum proliferum Pall.; Ornithogalum sternbergii Hoppe; Ornithogalum callosum Kit.; Ornithogalum gracile K.G.Hagen; Gagea sternbergii (Hoppe) Sweet; Gagea callosa (Kit.) Schult. & Schult.f.; Ornithogalum acutipetalum Herb. ex Schult. & Schult.f.; Ornithoxanthum gracile (K.G.Hagen) Link; Ornithoxanthum sternbergii (Hoppe) Link; Gagea baumgarteniana Schur

= Gagea minima =

Species of flowering plant

Gagea minima, known as the least gagea, is a Eurasian species of plants in the lily family.

Its native range is quite large, as it is found in much of south-central, southeastern, central and northern Europe (Italy, Germany, Scandinavia, and from there eastwards into European Russia), with additional populations in the Caucasus region.

Gagea minima is a bulb-forming perennial up to 20 cm (7.9 in) tall. Flowers are bright lemon yellow, sometimes green on the underside of the tepals.
