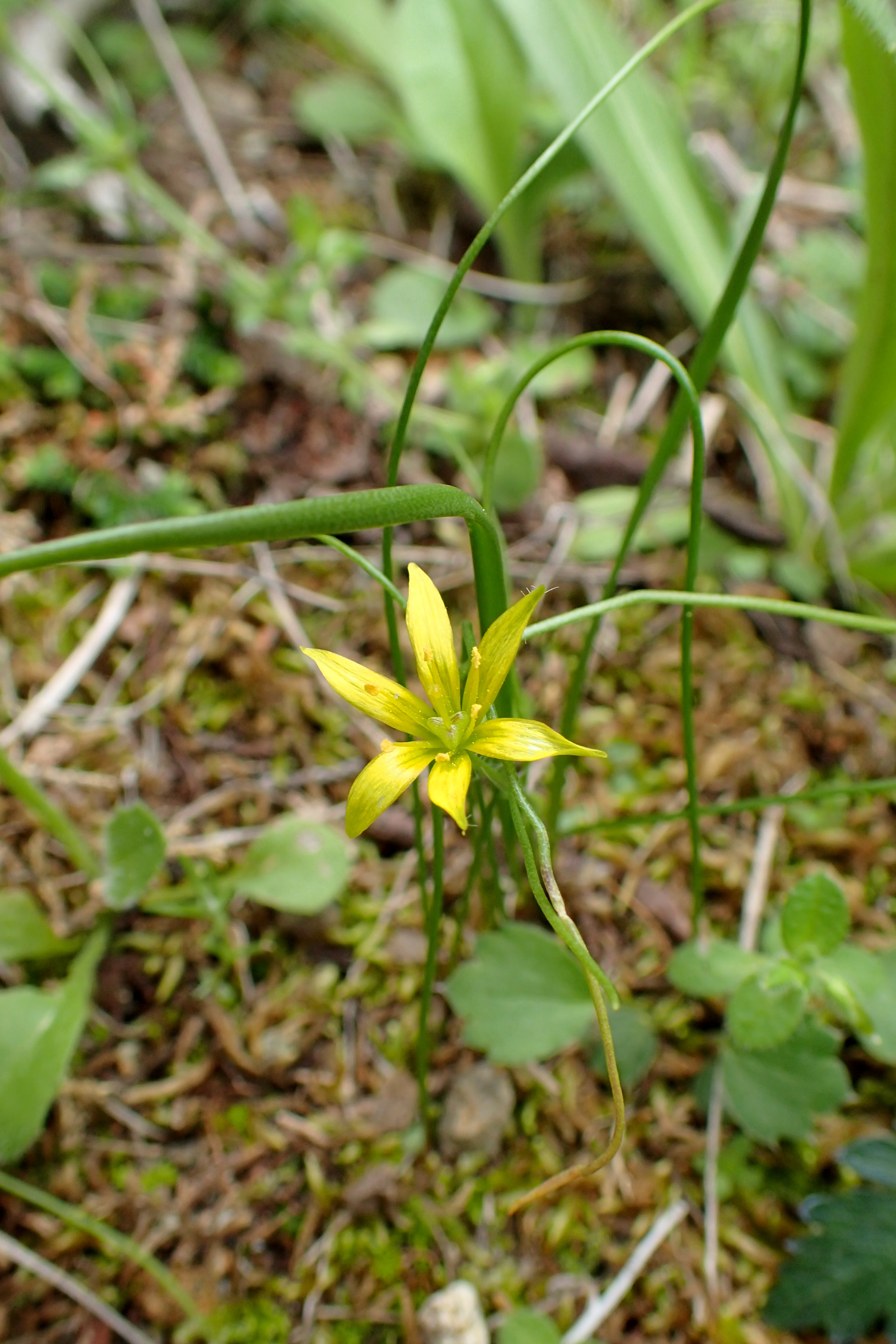

Scientific classification
- Kingdom: Plantae
- Clade: Embryophytes
- Clade: Tracheophytes
- Clade: Spermatophytes
- Clade: Angiosperms
- Clade: Monocots
- Order: Liliales
- Family: Liliaceae
- Subfamily: Lilioideae
- Genus: Gagea
- Species: G. peduncularis

Binomial name
- Gagea peduncularis (C.Presl) Pascher

Synonyms
- Ornithogalum pedunculare C.Presl

= Gagea peduncularis =

Species of flowering plant

Gagea peduncularis is a Mediterranean plant species in the family Liliaceae. It is native to Italy (Apulia), Greece (including Crete), the Balkans, Turkey, Cyprus, and Libya.

Gagea peduncularis is a bulb-forming perennial herb. Flowers look yellow from the front, green from the back.
