= Gagea triflora =

Scientific classification
- Kingdom: Plantae
- Clade: Embryophytes
- Clade: Tracheophytes
- Clade: Spermatophytes
- Clade: Angiosperms
- Clade: Monocots
- Order: Liliales
- Family: Liliaceae
- Subfamily: Lilioideae
- Genus: Gagea
- Species: G. triflora

Binomial name
- Gagea triflora (Ledeb.) Schult. & Schult.f.

Synonyms
- Synonymy: Ornithogalum triflorum Ledeb.; Lloydia triflora (Ledeb.) Baker; Stellaster triflorus (Ledeb.) Kuntze; Ornithogalum pauciflorum Turcz., 1834, illegitimate homonym not Raf. 1814 nor Baker 1897; Tulipa ornithogaloides Fisch. ex Besser

Species of flowering plant

Gagea triflora is an Asian species of plants in the lily family. It is native to Japan, Korea, China (Hebei, Heilongjiang, Jilin, Liaoning, Shanxi), and Russia (Amur Oblast, Primorye, Sakhalin, Kuril Islands, Kamchatka, Khabarovsk).

Gagea triflora is a bulb-forming perennial up to 30 cm (12 in) tall. Flowers are white with green veins.
