= Gagea tenera =

Scientific classification
- Kingdom: Plantae
- Clade: Embryophytes
- Clade: Tracheophytes
- Clade: Spermatophytes
- Clade: Angiosperms
- Clade: Monocots
- Order: Liliales
- Family: Liliaceae
- Subfamily: Lilioideae
- Genus: Gagea
- Species: G. tenera

Binomial name
- Gagea tenera Pascher

Synonyms
- Gagea kashmirensis Turrill; Gagea persica var. kashmirensis (Turrill) S.Dasgupta & D.B.Deb

Species of flowering plant

Gagea tenera is an Asian species of flowering plants in the lily family. It is native to Xinjiang, Central Asia, the Western Himalayas, Iran, Turkey, and South Caucasus.

Gagea tenera is a bulb-forming herb up to 15 cm (5.9 in) tall. Flowers are yellow or yellow-green.
