= Gagea soleirolii =

Scientific classification
- Kingdom: Plantae
- Clade: Embryophytes
- Clade: Tracheophytes
- Clade: Spermatophytes
- Clade: Angiosperms
- Clade: Monocots
- Order: Liliales
- Family: Liliaceae
- Subfamily: Lilioideae
- Genus: Gagea
- Species: G. soleirolii

Binomial name
- Gagea soleirolii F.W.Schultz

Synonyms
- Gagea foliosa subsp. soleirolii (F.W.Schultz) K.Richt.; Stellaris soleirolii (F.W.Schultz) Samp.; Gagea soleirolii subsp. guadarramica A.Terracc.; Gagea tenuis A.Terracc.; Gagea soleirolii var. tenuis (A.Terracc.) Cout.; Gagea guadarramica (A.Terracc.) Stroh

Species of flowering plant

Gagea soleirolii is a European flowering plant of the lily family. It is native to Spain (including the Balearic Islands), France (including Corsica), Portugal and Sardinia.
