= Gagea tisoniana =

Scientific classification
- Kingdom: Plantae
- Clade: Embryophytes
- Clade: Tracheophytes
- Clade: Spermatophytes
- Clade: Angiosperms
- Clade: Monocots
- Order: Liliales
- Family: Liliaceae
- Subfamily: Lilioideae
- Genus: Gagea
- Species: G. tisoniana

Binomial name
- Gagea tisoniana Peruzzi, Bartolucci, Frignani & Minut.

Species of flowering plant

Gagea tisoniana is an Italian species of small bulbous perennial plants lily family. It is found in the central part of the Italian Peninsula (Tuscany, Lazio, Umbria, and Marche).
