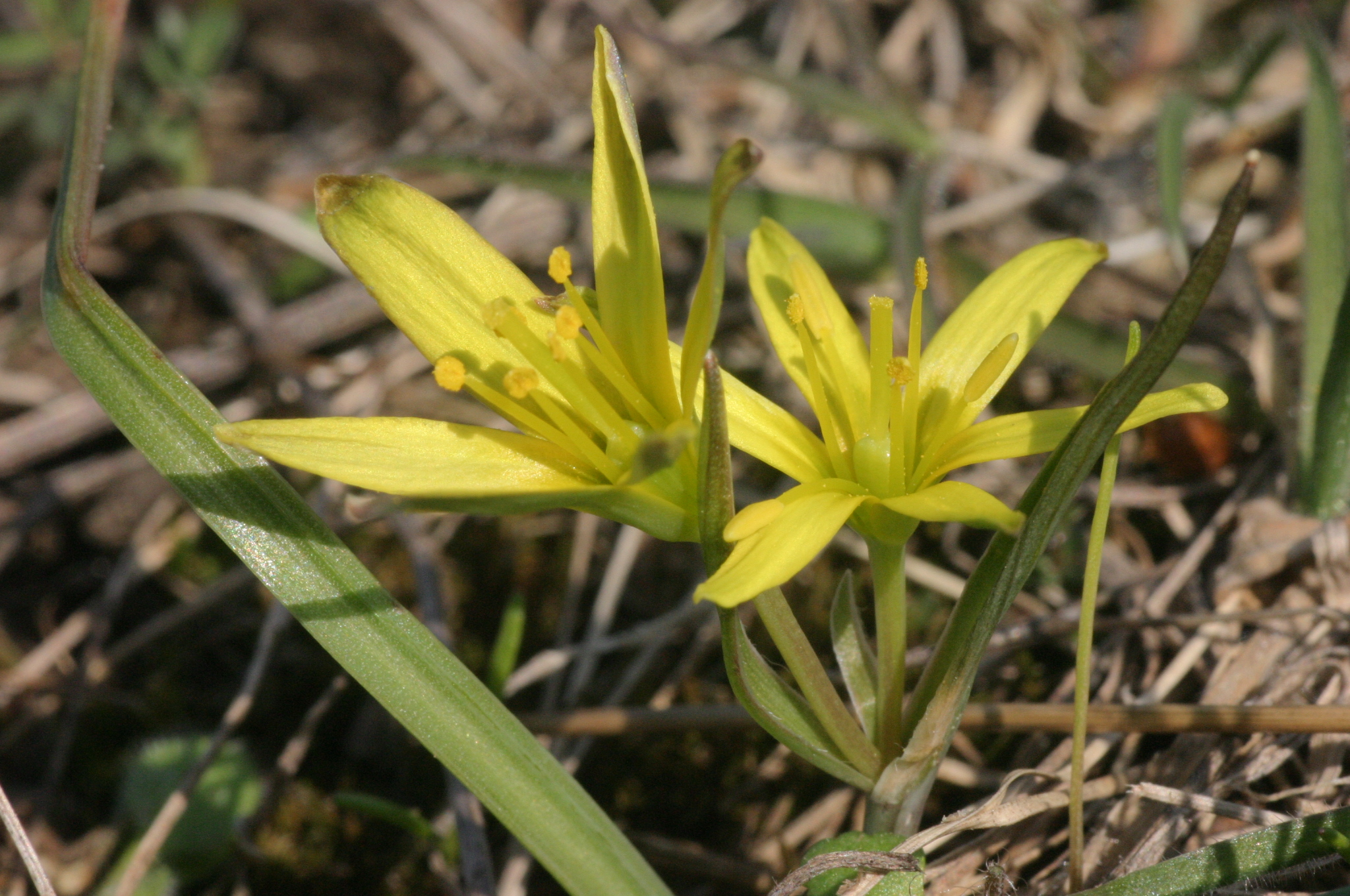

Scientific classification
- Kingdom: Plantae
- Clade: Embryophytes
- Clade: Tracheophytes
- Clade: Spermatophytes
- Clade: Angiosperms
- Clade: Monocots
- Order: Liliales
- Family: Liliaceae
- Subfamily: Lilioideae
- Genus: Gagea
- Species: G. pusilla

Binomial name
- Gagea pusilla (F.W.Schmidt) Sweet

Synonyms
- Ornithogalum pusillum F.W.Schmidt; Ornithogalum clusii Tausch; Gagea clusiana Schult. & Schult.f.; Ornithoxanthum pusillum (F.W.Schmidt) Link; Stellaster pusillus (F.W.Schmidt) Kuntze; Ornithogalum uniflorum Zauschn. [1776], illegitimate homonym not L. [1753]; Ornithogalum marginatum Pall.; Ornithogalum tunicatum J.Presl & C.Presl; Ornithogalum podolicum Besser ex Schult. & Schult.f.; Ornithogalum trigonophyllum Schult. & Schult.f.; Gagea tunicata (J.Presl & C.Presl) Kreutzer; Gagea reflexa Czern. ex Rchb.; Gagea pineticola Klokov; Gagea praeciosa Klokov

= Gagea pusilla =

Species of flowering plant

Gagea pusilla is a Eurasian plant species in the lily family. It is native to Italy, Greece, the Balkans, Austria, Hungary, Slovakia, Czech Republic, Ukraine, Belarus, Russia (European Russia, North Caucasus, West Siberia Krai), and Kazakhstan.

Gagea pusilla is a bulb-forming perennial herb. Its flowers are yellow.
