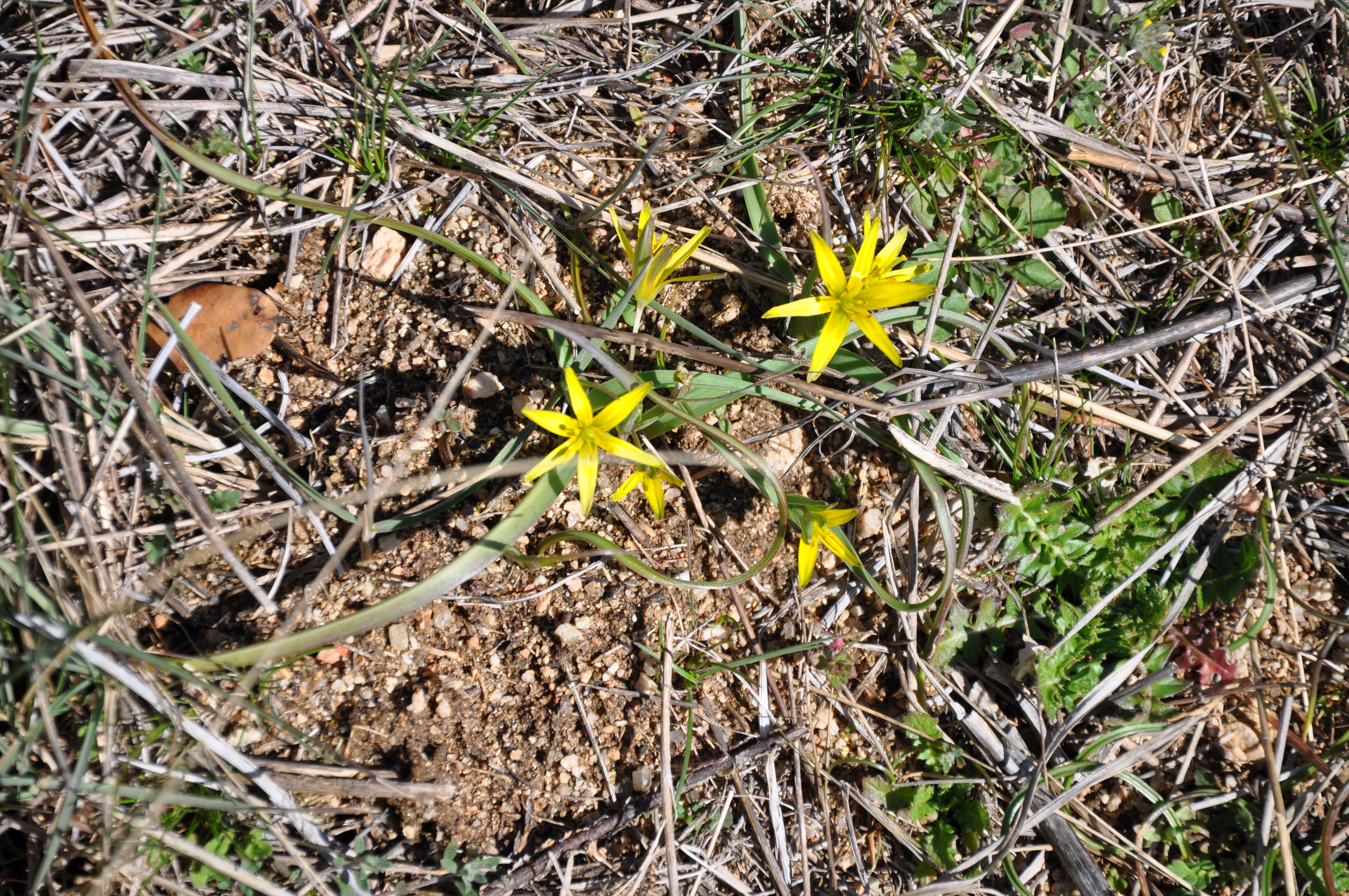

Scientific classification
- Kingdom: Plantae
- Clade: Embryophytes
- Clade: Tracheophytes
- Clade: Spermatophytes
- Clade: Angiosperms
- Clade: Monocots
- Order: Liliales
- Family: Liliaceae
- Subfamily: Lilioideae
- Genus: Gagea
- Species: G. foliosa

Binomial name
- Gagea foliosa (C.Presl) Schult. & Schult.f.

= Gagea foliosa =

Species of flowering plant

Gagea foliosa is a Mediterranean species of plants in the lily family. It is native to Spain incl. Balearic Islands, France incl. Corsica, Sardinia, Sicily, and Algeria.
