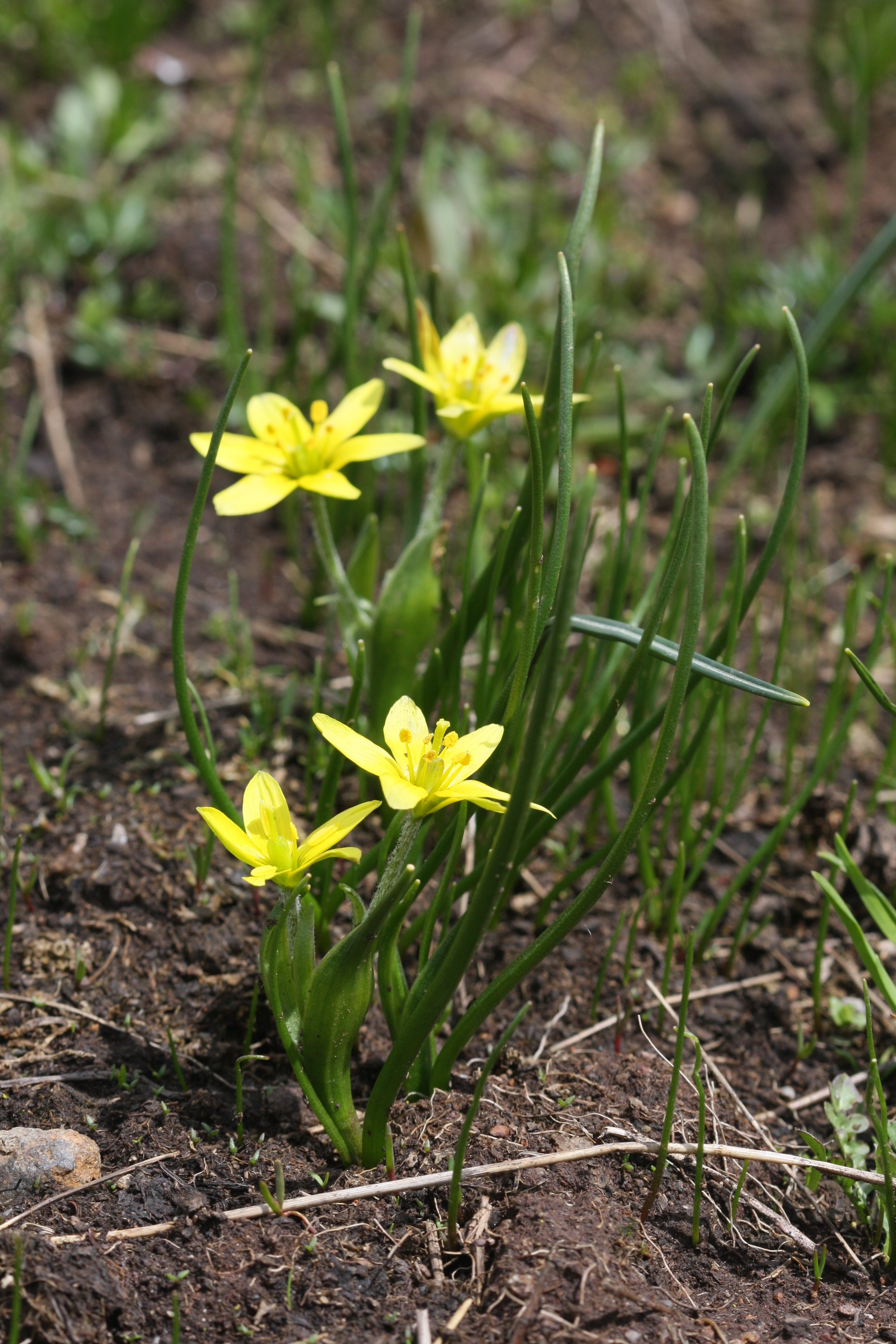

Scientific classification
- Kingdom: Plantae
- Clade: Embryophytes
- Clade: Tracheophytes
- Clade: Spermatophytes
- Clade: Angiosperms
- Clade: Monocots
- Order: Liliales
- Family: Liliaceae
- Subfamily: Lilioideae
- Genus: Gagea
- Species: G. liotardii

Binomial name
- Gagea liotardii (Vill.) Sternb.

Synonyms
- Synonymy: Ornithogalum liotardii Sternb.; Ornithoxanthum liotardii (Sternb.) Link; Stellaster liotardii (Sternb.) Kuntze; Ornithogalum erubescens Besser; Gagea erubescens (Besser) Schult. & Schult.f.; Gagea emarginata Kar. & Kir.; Gagea intermedia Schltdl. ex Rchb.; Gagea anisanthos K.Koch; Gagea brentae Evers; Gagea turcomanica Popov; Gagea mirabilis Grossh.; Gagea samojedorum Grossh.; Gagea lasczinskyi Zolot.; Gagea fragifera (Vill.) E.Bayer & G.López

= Gagea liotardii =

Species of flowering plant

Gagea liotardii is a Eurasian and North African species of plants in the lily family. It is a bulb-forming perennial up to 15 cm (5.9 in) tall. Flowers are generally bright yellow to yellow-green. Its native range stretches from Spain and Morocco to Mongolia.
