= Gagea jaeschkei =

Scientific classification
- Kingdom: Plantae
- Clade: Embryophytes
- Clade: Tracheophytes
- Clade: Spermatophytes
- Clade: Angiosperms
- Clade: Monocots
- Order: Liliales
- Family: Liliaceae
- Subfamily: Lilioideae
- Genus: Gagea
- Species: G. jaeschkei

Binomial name
- Gagea jaeschkei Pascher

Synonyms
- Gagea jaeschkei var. grandiflora Pascher; Gagea pamirica Grossh.; Gagea pamirica var. spitiensis Balodi & Uniyal

Species of flowering plant

Gagea jaeschkei is an Asian species of plants in the lily family. It is native to Kazakhstan, Xinjiang, Tajikistan, Uzbekistan, Afghanistan, Pakistan, and northern India.

Gagea jaeschkei is a bulb-forming perennial up to 5 cm tall. Flowers are yellow in the front, dull purple on the backside.

formerly included

- Gagea jaeschkei var. praecedens, now called Gagea gageoides
