= Gagea mauritanica =

Conservation status
- Near Threatened (IUCN 3.1)

Scientific classification
- Kingdom: Plantae
- Clade: Embryophytes
- Clade: Tracheophytes
- Clade: Spermatophytes
- Clade: Angiosperms
- Clade: Monocots
- Order: Liliales
- Family: Liliaceae
- Subfamily: Lilioideae
- Genus: Gagea
- Species: G. mauritanica

Binomial name
- Gagea mauritanica Durieu

Synonyms
- Gagea mauritanica var. balansae A.Terracc.

Species of flowering plant

Gagea mauritanica is a species of flowering plant in the lily family, Liliaceae. This Mediterranean plant is native to the Balearic Islands, and Algeria. Gagea mauritanica is a bulb-forming perennial herb with yellow flowers.
