= Gagea filiformis =

Scientific classification
- Kingdom: Plantae
- Clade: Embryophytes
- Clade: Tracheophytes
- Clade: Spermatophytes
- Clade: Angiosperms
- Clade: Monocots
- Order: Liliales
- Family: Liliaceae
- Subfamily: Lilioideae
- Genus: Gagea
- Species: G. filiformis

Binomial name
- Gagea filiformis (Ledeb.) Kar. & Kir.

Synonyms
- Synonymy: Ornithogalum filiforme Ledeb.; Gagea sacculifera Regel; Gagea filiformis var. regeliana Pascher; Gagea pseudoerubescens Pascher; Gagea filiformis f. obtusata Pascher; Gagea filiformis f. pseudogranulosa Pascher; Gagea filiformis f. regeliana (Pascher) Pascher; Gagea minuta Grossh.; Gagea nigra L.Z.Shue

Species of flowering plant

Gagea filiformis is an Asian species of plants in the lily family, native to Russia (Altay Krai), China (Xinjiang), Kazakhstan, Kyrgyzstan, Tajikistan, Uzbekistan, Afghanistan, Pakistan, and Mongolia.

Gagea filiformis is a bulb-forming perennial up to 10 cm (3.9 in) tall. Flowers are yellow or yellow-green.
