= Gagea neopopovii =

Scientific classification
- Kingdom: Plantae
- Clade: Embryophytes
- Clade: Tracheophytes
- Clade: Spermatophytes
- Clade: Angiosperms
- Clade: Monocots
- Order: Liliales
- Family: Liliaceae
- Subfamily: Lilioideae
- Genus: Gagea
- Species: G. neopopovii

Binomial name
- Gagea neopopovii Golosk.

Synonyms
- Gagea vaginata Popov ex Golosk. 1955, illegitimate homonym not Pascher 1906; Gagea subalpina L.Z.Shue 1980, illegitimate superfluous name

Species of flowering plant

Gagea neopopovii is an Asian species of plants in the lily family. It is native to Xinjiang and Kazakhstan

Gagea neopopovii is a bulb-forming perennial up to 12 cm (4.7 in) tall. Flowers look yellow from the front, dark reddish-purple from the rear.
