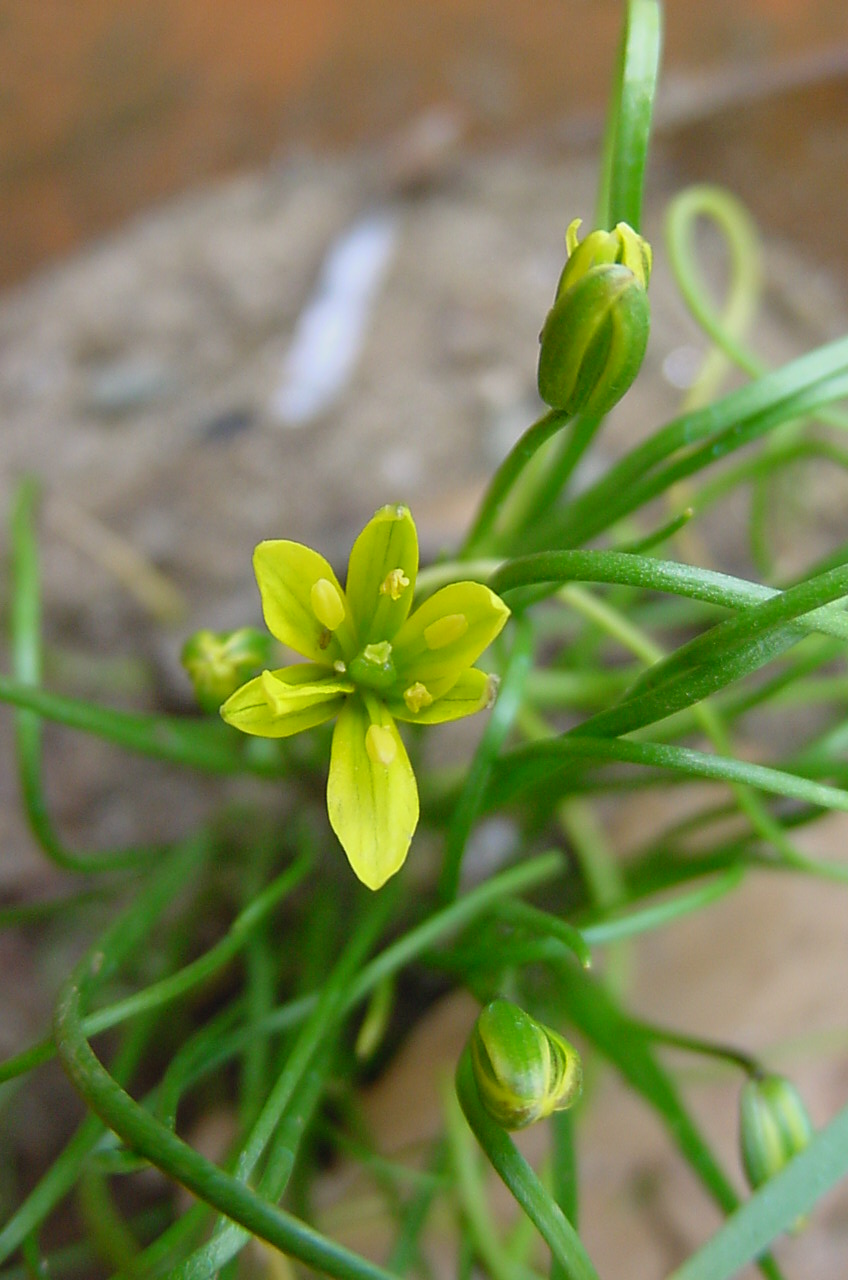

Scientific classification
- Kingdom: Plantae
- Clade: Embryophytes
- Clade: Tracheophytes
- Clade: Spermatophytes
- Clade: Angiosperms
- Clade: Monocots
- Order: Liliales
- Family: Liliaceae
- Subfamily: Lilioideae
- Genus: Gagea
- Species: G. chrysantha

Binomial name
- Gagea chrysantha Schult. & Schult.f.

Synonyms
- Ornithogalum chrysanthum Jan; Stellaster chrysanthus Kuntze

= Gagea chrysantha =

Species of flowering plant

Gagea chrysantha is a European species of plants in the lily family, found only in Italy and Sicily. Similar populations from the eastern Mediterranean have long been referred to G. chrysantha but recent evidence suggests that this group is actually a complex of several species rather than a single species.

Gagea chrysantha is a bulb-forming herb with yellow flowers.
