= Gagea daqingshanensis =

Scientific classification
- Kingdom: Plantae
- Clade: Embryophytes
- Clade: Tracheophytes
- Clade: Spermatophytes
- Clade: Angiosperms
- Clade: Monocots
- Order: Liliales
- Family: Liliaceae
- Subfamily: Lilioideae
- Genus: Gagea
- Species: G. daqingshanensis

Binomial name
- Gagea daqingshanensis L.Q.Zhao & Jie Yang

Species of flowering plant

Gagea daqingshanensis is a Chinese species of plants in the lily family, found only in the Inner Mongolia (Nei Mongol) region of China.
