= Gagea nakaiana =

Scientific classification
- Kingdom: Plantae
- Clade: Embryophytes
- Clade: Tracheophytes
- Clade: Spermatophytes
- Clade: Angiosperms
- Clade: Monocots
- Order: Liliales
- Family: Liliaceae
- Subfamily: Lilioideae
- Genus: Gagea
- Species: G. nakaiana

Binomial name
- Gagea nakaiana Kitag.

Synonyms
- Gagea coreana Nakai 1932, illegitimate homonym not H. Lév. 1910; Gagea coreanica Koidz., illegitimate superfluous name; Gagea lutea var. nakaiana (Kitag.) Q.S.Sun

Species of flowering plant

Gagea nakaiana is an Asian species of plants in the lily family. It is native to northeastern China (Heilongjiang, Jilin, Liaoning), Russia (Kamchatka, Kuril Islands, Sakhalin, Primorye, Altay Krai, Krasnoyarsk), Japan, Korea, Nepal, Bhutan, Pakistan, and northern India.

Gagea nakaiana is a bulb-forming perennial up to 20 cm (8 in) tall. Flowers are yellow.
