= Gagea kunawurensis =

Scientific classification
- Kingdom: Plantae
- Clade: Embryophytes
- Clade: Tracheophytes
- Clade: Spermatophytes
- Clade: Angiosperms
- Clade: Monocots
- Order: Liliales
- Family: Liliaceae
- Subfamily: Lilioideae
- Genus: Gagea
- Species: G. kunawurensis

Binomial name
- Gagea kunawurensis (Royle) Greuter

Synonyms
- Synonymy: Lloydia kunawurensis Royle; Gagea stipitata Merckl. ex Bunge; Gagea persica var. ebulbillosa Boiss.; Gagea thesioides C.A.Mey. ex Boiss.; Gagea ova Stapf.; Gagea stipitata var. mercklinii Pascher; Gagea stipitata var. ova (Stapf) Pascher; Gagea mercklinii (Pascher) Levichev; Gagea ebulbillosa (Boiss.) Levichev

Species of flowering plant

Gagea kunawurensis is an Asian species of plants in the lily family. It is native to Central Asia, Xinjiang, Afghanistan, Iran, Pakistan, Western Himalayas, and South Caucasus.

Gagea kunawurensis is a bulb-forming perennial up to 15 cm (5.9 in) tall. Its leaves are very narrow and thread-like, up to 15 cm long. The flowers are white or very pale yellow.
