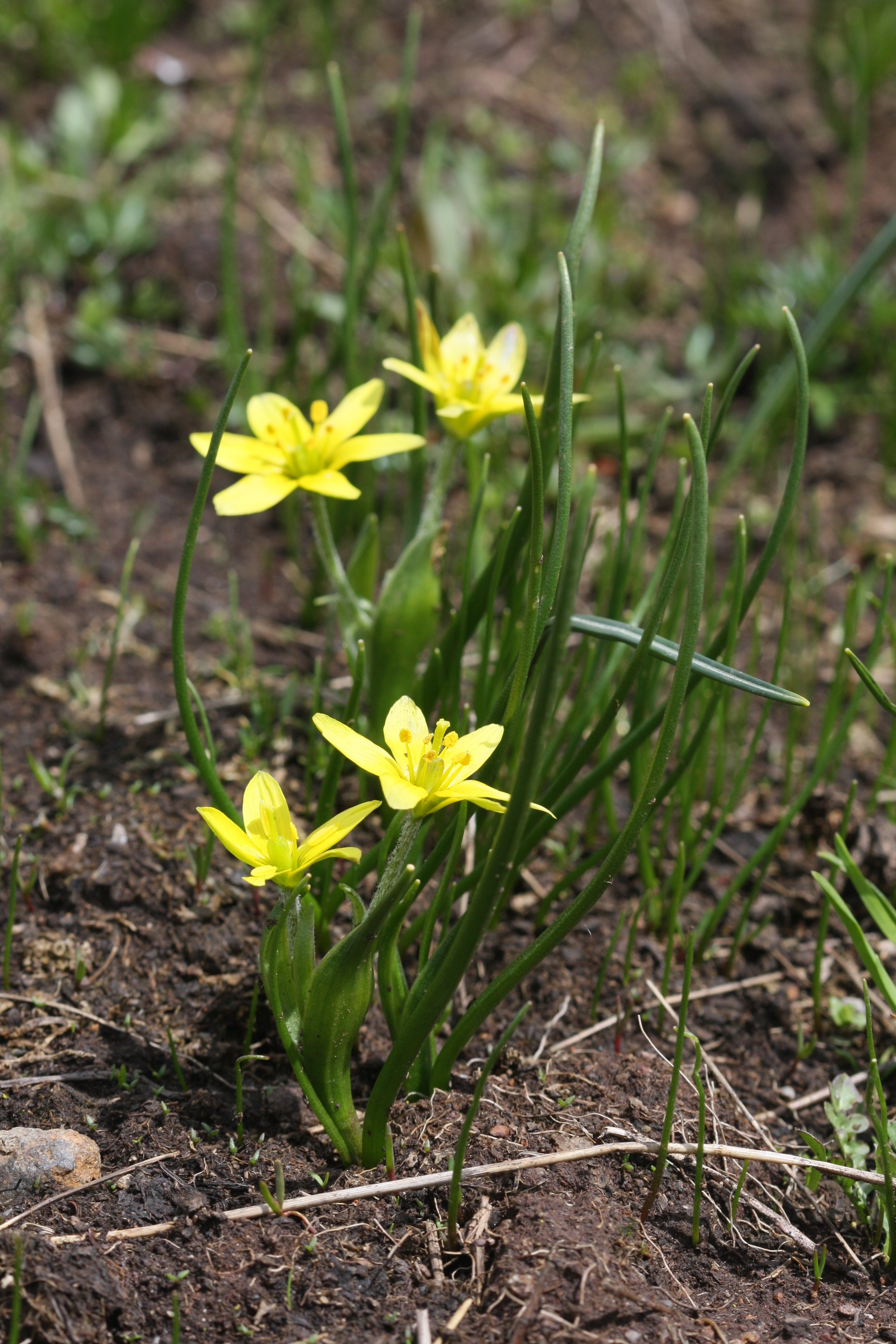

Scientific classification
- Kingdom: Plantae
- Clade: Embryophytes
- Clade: Tracheophytes
- Clade: Spermatophytes
- Clade: Angiosperms
- Clade: Monocots
- Order: Liliales
- Family: Liliaceae
- Subfamily: Lilioideae
- Genus: Gagea
- Species: G. alberti

Binomial name
- Gagea alberti Regel

Synonyms
- Gagea albertii, alternate spelling

= Gagea alberti =

Species of flowering plant

Gagea alberti is an Asian species of plants in the lily family, native to Kazakhstan, Kyrgyzstan and Xinjiang Province of western China.

Gagea alberti is a bulb-forming perennial up to 15 cm (5.9 in) tall. Flowers are pale yellow to yellow-green.
