= Gagea stepposa =

Scientific classification
- Kingdom: Plantae
- Clade: Embryophytes
- Clade: Tracheophytes
- Clade: Spermatophytes
- Clade: Angiosperms
- Clade: Monocots
- Order: Liliales
- Family: Liliaceae
- Subfamily: Lilioideae
- Genus: Gagea
- Species: G. stepposa

Binomial name
- Gagea stepposa L.Z.Shue

Species of flowering plant

Gagea stepposa is a Chinese flowering plant in the lily family. It is found only in the northern part of Xinjiang Province in northwestern China.

Gagea stepposa is a bulb-forming herb up to 6 cm (2.4 in) tall. Flowers are yellow-orange from the front, dark purple from the back.
