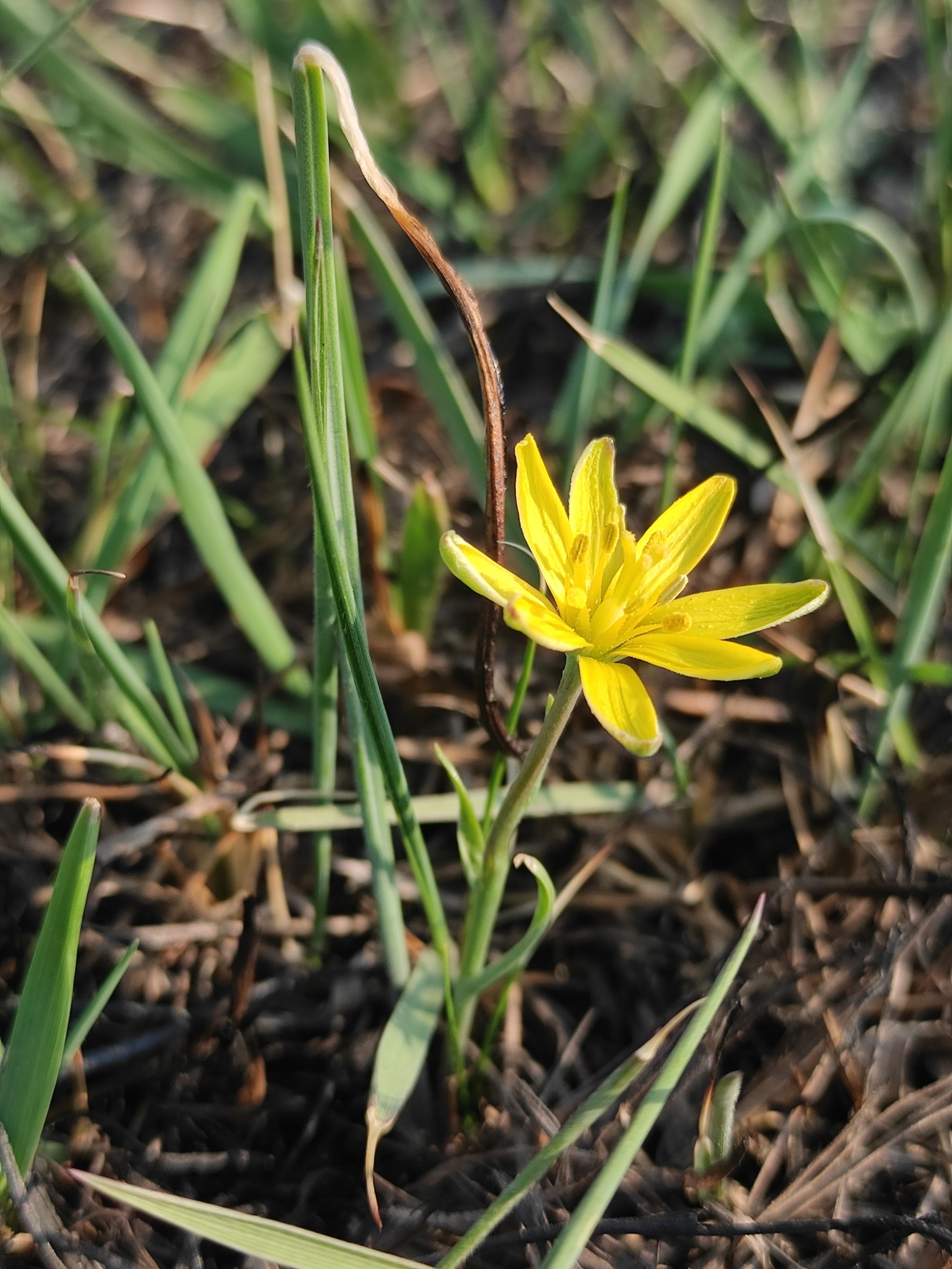

Scientific classification
- Kingdom: Plantae
- Clade: Tracheophytes
- Clade: Angiosperms
- Clade: Monocots
- Order: Liliales
- Family: Liliaceae
- Subfamily: Lilioideae
- Genus: Gagea
- Species: G. pauciflora

Binomial name
- Gagea pauciflora Turcz.

Synonyms
- Synonymy: Plecostigma pauciflorum Turcz. ex Trautv.; Szechenyia lloydioides Kanitz; Lloydia szechenyiana Engl.; Gagea lloydioides (Kanitz) Pascher; Gagea provisa Pascher; Gagea pauciflora var. karoana Pascher

= Gagea pauciflora =

Species of flowering plant

Gagea pauciflora is an Asian species of plants in the lily family. It is native to Mongolia, Russia (Primorye, Amur Oblast, Zabaykalsky Krai, Yakutia, Krasnoyarsk, Irkutsk, Altay Krai, Buryatia), and China (Gansu, Hebei, Heilongjiang, Inner Mongolia, Qinghai, Shaanxi, Tibet).

Gagea pauciflora is a bulb-forming perennial up to 30 cm tall. Flowers yellowish-green. The specific epithet pauciflora, refers to the Latin term for 'few flowered'.
