= Gagea amblyopetala =

Conservation status
- Least Concern (IUCN 3.1)

Scientific classification
- Kingdom: Plantae
- Clade: Tracheophytes
- Clade: Angiosperms
- Clade: Monocots
- Order: Liliales
- Family: Liliaceae
- Subfamily: Lilioideae
- Tribe: Lilieae
- Genus: Gagea
- Species: G. amblyopetala

Binomial name
- Gagea amblyopetala Boiss. & Heldr.

Synonyms
- Synonymy: Stellaster amblyopetalus (Boiss. & Heldr.) Kuntze; Gagea amblyopetala var. montana Pascher; Gagea amblyopetala var. angustifolia A.Terracc.; Gagea amblyopetala var. elata A.Terracc.; Gagea amblyopetala subsp. heldreichii A.Terracc.; Gagea amblyopetala var. pumila A.Terracc.; Gagea amblyopetala var. spathacea A.Terracc.; Gagea amblyopetala var. depauperata Pascher; Gagea amblyopetala var. heldreichii (A.Terracc.) Pascher; Gagea heldreichii (A.Terracc.) Lojac.; Gagea montana (Pascher) Pascher ex Uphof

Species of flowering plant in the lily family

Gagea amblyopetala is a Eurasian species of plants in the lily family, Liliaceae. It is native to the Aegean Islands, Albania, Crete, Crimea, Greece, Italy, Sicily, Turkey, Yugoslavia. It is a bulb-forming perennial with yellow flowers.
