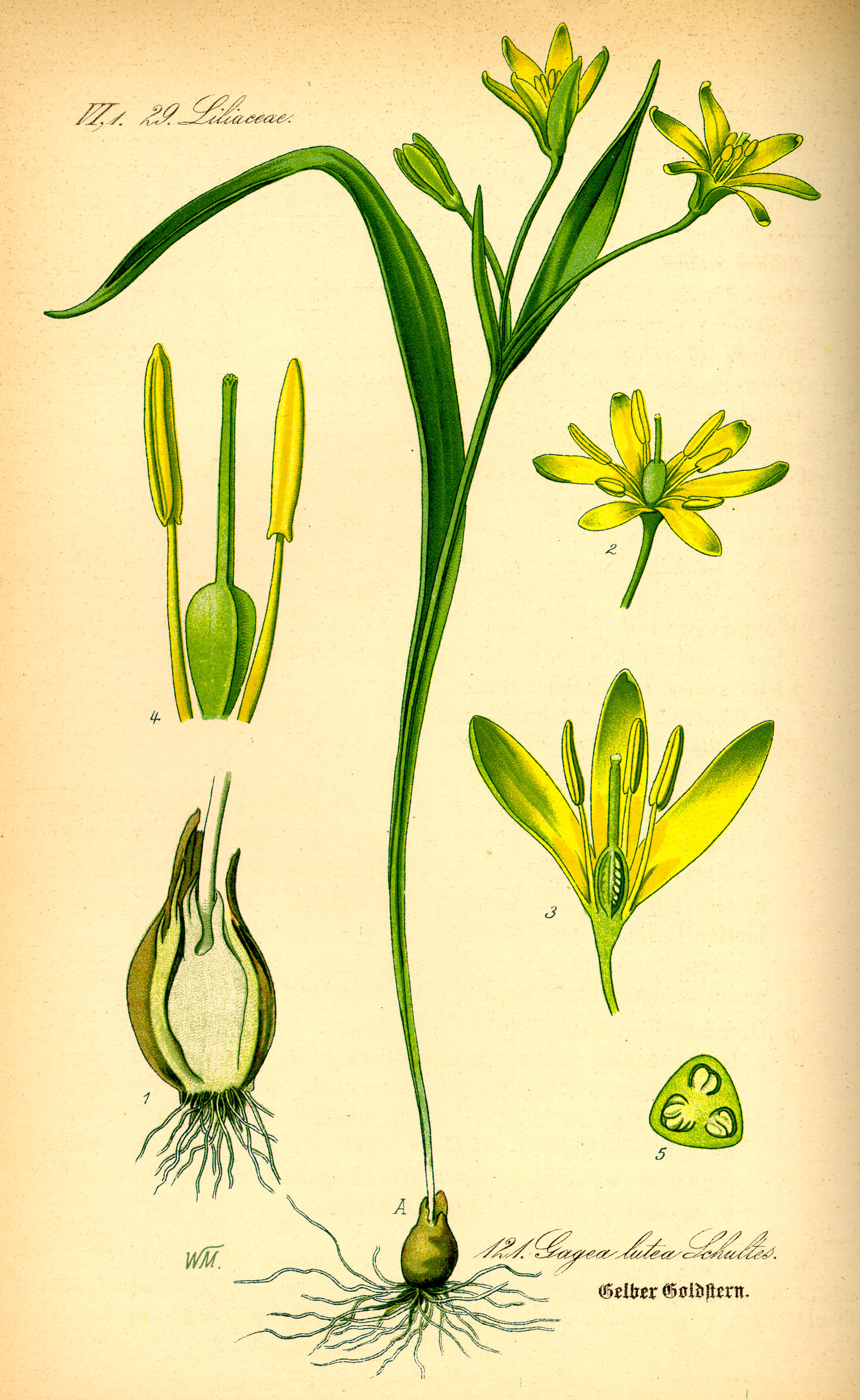
- 1885 illustration

Scientific classification
- Kingdom: Plantae
- Clade: Embryophytes
- Clade: Tracheophytes
- Clade: Spermatophytes
- Clade: Angiosperms
- Clade: Monocots
- Order: Liliales
- Family: Liliaceae
- Subfamily: Lilioideae
- Genus: Gagea
- Species: G. lutea

Binomial name
- Gagea lutea (L.) Ker Gawl

Synonyms
- Synonymy: Ornithogalum luteum L.; Gagea fascicularis Salisb.; Ornithoxanthum luteum (L.) Link; Solenarium luteum (L.) Dulac).; Stellaster luteus (L.) Kuntze; Ornithogalum sylvaticum Pers.; Ornithogalum persoonii Hoppe; Gagea glauca Sweet.; Ornithoxanthum persoonii (Hoppe) Link; Ornithoxanthum sylvaticum (Pers.) Link; Gagea sylvatica (Pers.) Loudon; Gagea elegans Wall. ex G.Don; Gagea transsilvanica Schur; Gagea glauca Blocki; Gagea indica Pascher; Gagea lowariensis Pascher; Gagea escarelii Arènes & Bouchard

= Gagea lutea =

Species of flowering plant

Gagea lutea, known as the yellow star-of-Bethlehem, is a Eurasian flowering plant species in the family Liliaceae. It is widespread in central Europe with scattered populations in Great Britain, Spain, and Norway to Siberia and Japan.

Gagea lutea is a bulb-forming herbaceous perennial with lanceolate leaves and green-tinged yellow flowers with 6 tepals. It is a predominantly lowland species that inhabits moist, base-rich, shady habitats including; broad-leaf woodlands, hedgerows, limestone pavements, pastures, and riverbanks. It has been used as an indicator of ancient woodland in East Anglia.
