= Gagea dubia =

Scientific classification
- Kingdom: Plantae
- Clade: Embryophytes
- Clade: Tracheophytes
- Clade: Spermatophytes
- Clade: Angiosperms
- Clade: Monocots
- Order: Liliales
- Family: Liliaceae
- Subfamily: Lilioideae
- Genus: Gagea
- Species: G. dubia

Binomial name
- Gagea dubia A.Terracc.

Synonyms
- Gagea pinardii A.Terracc.; Gagea maroccana (A.Terracc.) Sennen & Mauricio

Species of flowering plant

Gagea dubia is a Mediterranean species of plants in the lily family. It is native to Morocco, Spain, France, Sardinia, Sicily, Greece including Crete, Turkey, Syria, Lebanon, and Iran.

Gagea dubia is a bulb-forming herb with yellow flowers.
