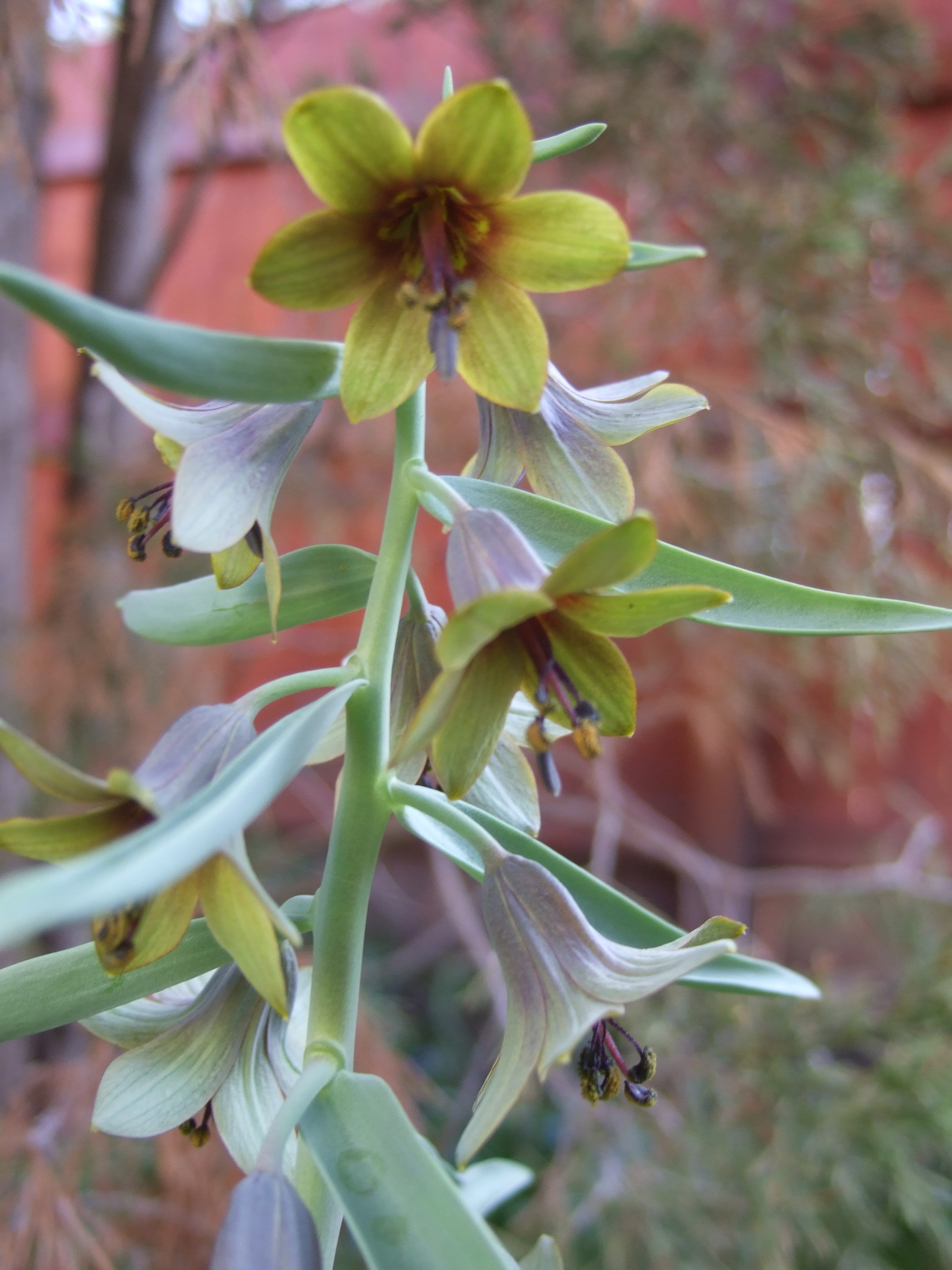

Scientific classification
- Kingdom: Plantae
- Clade: Tracheophytes
- Clade: Angiosperms
- Clade: Monocots
- Order: Liliales
- Family: Liliaceae
- Subfamily: Lilioideae
- Genus: Fritillaria
- Species: F. sewerzowii

Binomial name
- Fritillaria sewerzowii Regel

Synonyms
- Korolkowia sewerzowii Regel; Korolkowia discolor Regel

= Fritillaria sewerzowii =

Species of flowering plant

Fritillaria sewerzowii is a perennial herbaceous bulbous plant, distributed in alpine areas of central Asia. It is a species in the genus Fritillaria, in the lily family Liliaceae. It is placed in the subgenus Korolkowia.

== Description ==
Fritillaria sewerzowii reaches a height of 20–50 cm. The egg-shaped bulb is about 5 cm in diameter. The leaves are fleshy and broadly oval at the base of the plant stem and are up to 15 cm in length and evenly distributed up the stem. The plant produces four to ten purple-brown star-shaped individual flowers, 3 cm in length, arising from the leaf axes in the upper stem. F. sewerzowii blooms in early March.

== Taxonomy ==
First described by Regel in 1868, Baker (1874), who divided Fritillaria into subgenera, placed F. sewerzowii in subgenus Korolkowia as its sole species. Although some authors have treated Korolkowia as a separate genus, molecular phylogenetics has shown that it is embedded within Fritillaria.

== Distribution and habitat ==
Fritillaria sewerzowii is found in scrub on rocky slopes or lightly wooded areas of Kyrgyzstan and Uzbekistan at 1000–3000 metres altitude.

== Cultivation ==
Fritillaria sewerzowii is winter hardy (USDA 4-8), but requires well drained soil.

== Bibliography ==
- Baker, J. G. (1874). "Revision of the Genera and Species of Tulipeae". Botanical Journal of the Linnean Society. xiv (76). F. sewerzowii p. 267. doi:10.1111/j.1095-8339.1874.tb00314.x.
- Day, Peter D.; Berger, Madeleine; Hill, Laurence; Fay, Michael F.; Leitch, Andrew R.; Leitch, Ilia J.; Kelly, Laura J. (November 2014). "Evolutionary relationships in the medicinally important genus Fritillaria L. (Liliaceae)". Molecular Phylogenetics and Evolution. 80: 11–19. doi:10.1016/j.ympev.2014.07.024. PMID 25124097.
- Regel, Eduard August von (1868). "Enumeratio plantarum in regionibus cis- et transiliensibus a CL. seminovio anno 1857 collectarum: Liliaceae: Fritillaria sewerzowi Rgl, 443−444". Bulletin de la Société impériale des naturalistes de Moscou (in Latin). 41 (2): 378–459.
- Rønsted, N.; Law, S.; Thornton, H.; Fay, M. F.; Chase, M. W. (2005). "Molecular phylogenetic evidence for the monophyly of Fritillaria and Lilium (Liliaceae; Liliales) and the infrageneric classification of Fritillaria". Molecular Phylogenetics and Evolution. 35 (3): 509–527. CiteSeerX 10.1.1.574.7908. doi:10.1016/j.ympev.2004.12.023. PMID 15878122.
- Turrill, William Bertram; Sealy, J. Robert (1980). "Studies in the Genus Fritillaria (Liliaceae)". Hooker's Icones Plantarum. 39: 1–2.
- TPL (2013). "The Plant List 1.1: Fritillaria sewerzowii Regel". Royal Botanic Gardens, Kew and Missouri Botanical Garden.
- WCSP. "Fritillaria sewerzowiir Regel". World Checklist of Selected Plant Families (WCSP). Royal Botanic Gardens, Kew.
- "Fritillaria sewerzowii Regel". International Plant Names Index. 2005.
- "Fritillaria sewerzowii". Fritillaria species: A. Fritillaria Group, Alpine Garden Society.
- Roskov Y.; Kunze T.; Orrell T.; Abucay L.; Paglinawan L.; Culham A.; Bailly N.; Kirk P.; Bourgoin T.; Baillargeon G.; Decock W.; De Wever A.; Didžiulis V., eds. (2014). "Fritillaria sewerzowii Regel". Species 2000 & ITIS Catalogue of Life: 2014 Annual Checklist. Naturalis, Leiden, the Netherlands: ITIS, Royal Botanic Gardens, Kew.
- "Fritillaria sewerzowii - Regel". Plants for a Future.
