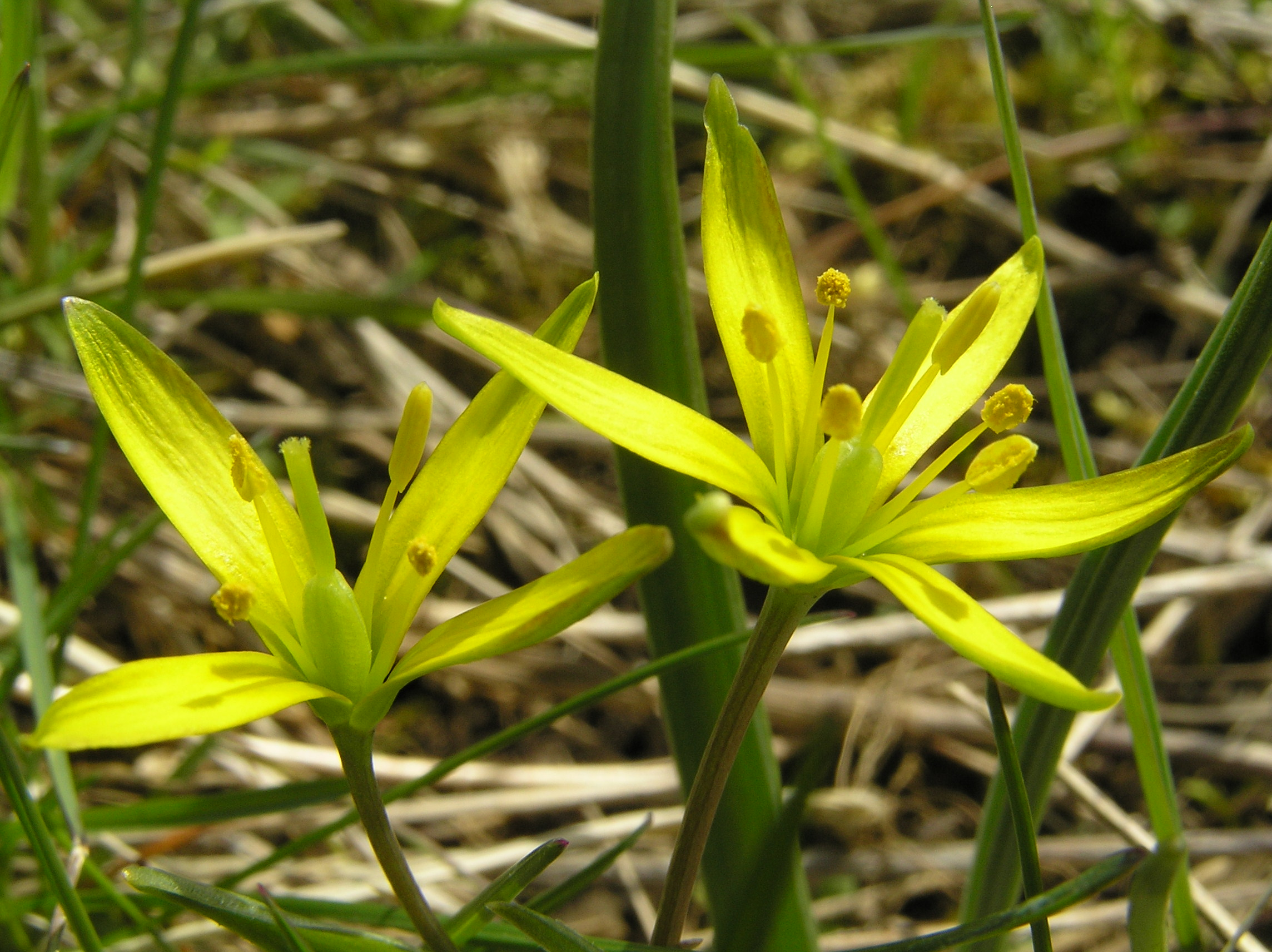

Scientific classification
- Kingdom: Plantae
- Clade: Tracheophytes
- Clade: Angiosperms
- Clade: Monocots
- Order: Liliales
- Family: Liliaceae
- Subfamily: Lilioideae
- Tribe: Lilieae
- Genus: Gagea
- Species: G. pratensis

Binomial name
- Gagea pratensis (Pers.) Dumort.

Synonyms
- Synonymy: Ornithogalum pratense Pers.; Gagea bracteolaris Salisb.; Ornithoxanthum pratense (Pers.) Link; Stellaster pratensis (Pers.) Kuntze; Ornithogalum schreberi Rchb.; Ornithogalum nudiscapum Schultz; Ornithogalum simplex Becker; Ornithogalum stenopetalum Fr.; Ornithogalum intermedium Schultz ex Schult. & Schult.f.; Ornithoxanthum stenopetalum (Fr.) Link; Gagea schreberi Rchb.; Gagea stenopetala (Fr.) Rchb.; Ornithogalum glaucum Dethard. ex Schult. & Schult.f.; Gagea equitans Wallr.; Gagea composita Opiz; Gagea succedanea Griseb. & Schenk; Gagea nova Samp. ex Lopes; Gagea gussonei (A.Terracc.) Stroh

= Gagea pratensis =

Yellow star of Bethlehem

Species of flowering plant

Gagea pratensis, called the yellow star-of-Bethlehem, is a European and Mediterranean plant species in the lily family. It is widespread across much of Europe as well as Turkey and Morocco. It was first described to science by Persoon in 1794.

Gagea pratensis is a bulb-forming perennial. Flowers are generally yellow, sometimes with a green stripe along the backside of each tepal.

formerly included

- Gagea pratensis var. paczoskii, now called Gagea transversalis
