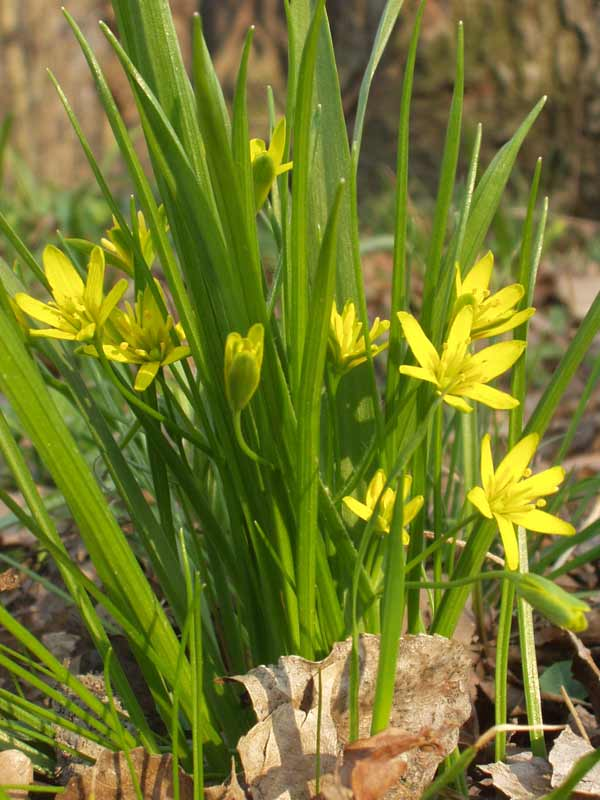
- Gagea lutea

Scientific classification
- Kingdom: Plantae
- Clade: Tracheophytes
- Clade: Angiosperms
- Clade: Monocots
- Order: Liliales
- Family: Liliaceae
- Subfamily: Lilioideae
- Tribe: Lilieae
- Genus: Gagea; Salisb.

Synonyms
- Upoxis Adans.; Rhabdocrinum Rchb.; Ornithoxanthum Link; Lloydia Salisb. ex Rchb. 1830 not Delile 1844 (Poaceae); Nectarobothrium Ledeb.; Cronyxium Raf.; Hemierium Raf.; Hornungia Bernh. [1840], illegitimate homonym not Rchb. [1837] (Brassicaceae); Reggeria Raf.; Bulbillaria Zucc.; Plecostigma Turcz.; Boissiera Haens. ex Willk. [1846], illegitimate homonym not Hochst. ex Steud. [1840] (syn of Bromus in Poaceae) nor Hochst. ex Griseb. [1852] (Poaceae); Solenarium Dulac; Szechenyia Kanitz; Giraldiella Dammer

= Gagea =

Genus of flowering plants in the lily family

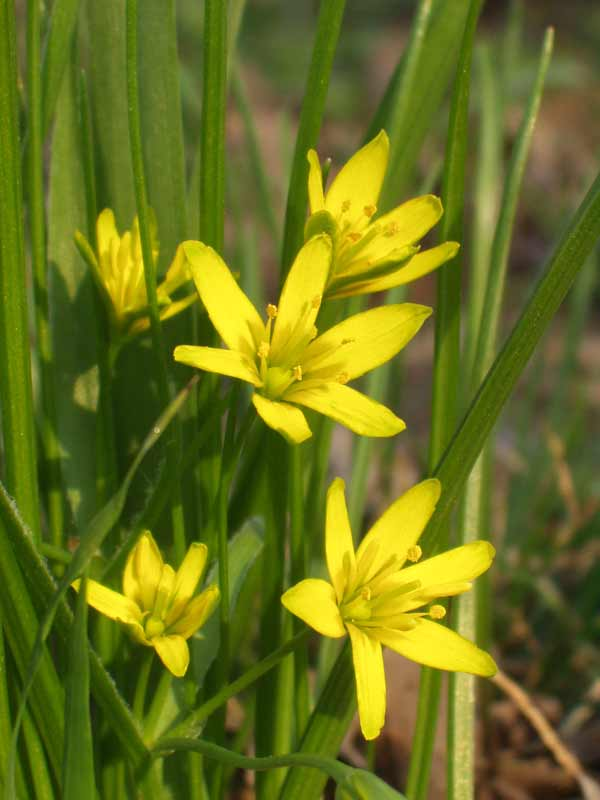
Flowers of Gagea lutea

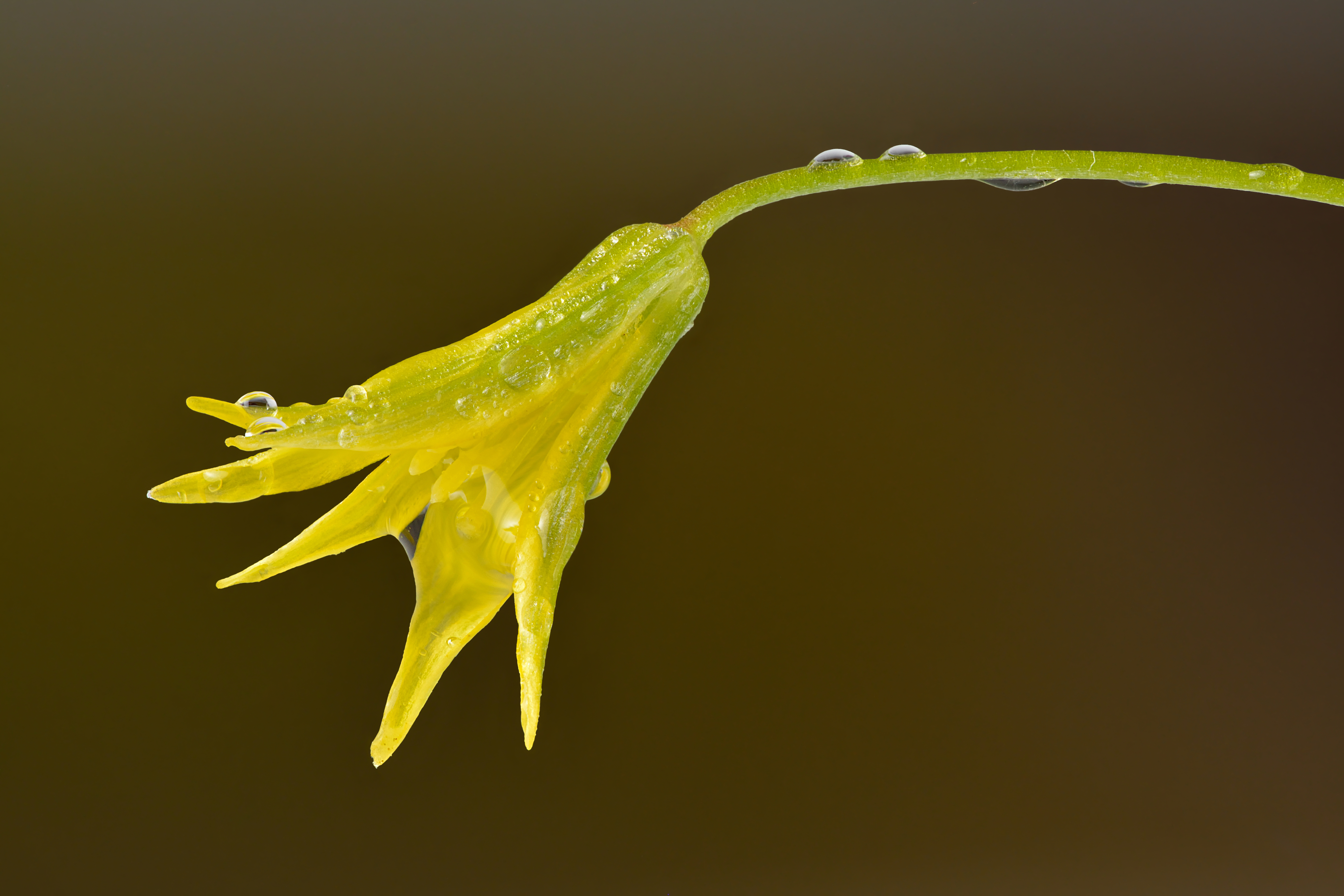
Gagea minima (least gagea)

Gagea is a large genus of spring flowers in the lily family. Gagea species are perennially flowering plants. It is found primarily in Eurasia with a few species extending into North Africa and one species (Gagea serotina) in North America.

The genus is named after the English naturalist Sir Thomas Gage (1781–1820). They were originally described as species of Ornithogalum, which, together with the usual yellow colour of the flowers, explains the English name yellow star-of-Bethlehem for the common European species, Gagea lutea.

== Morphology ==
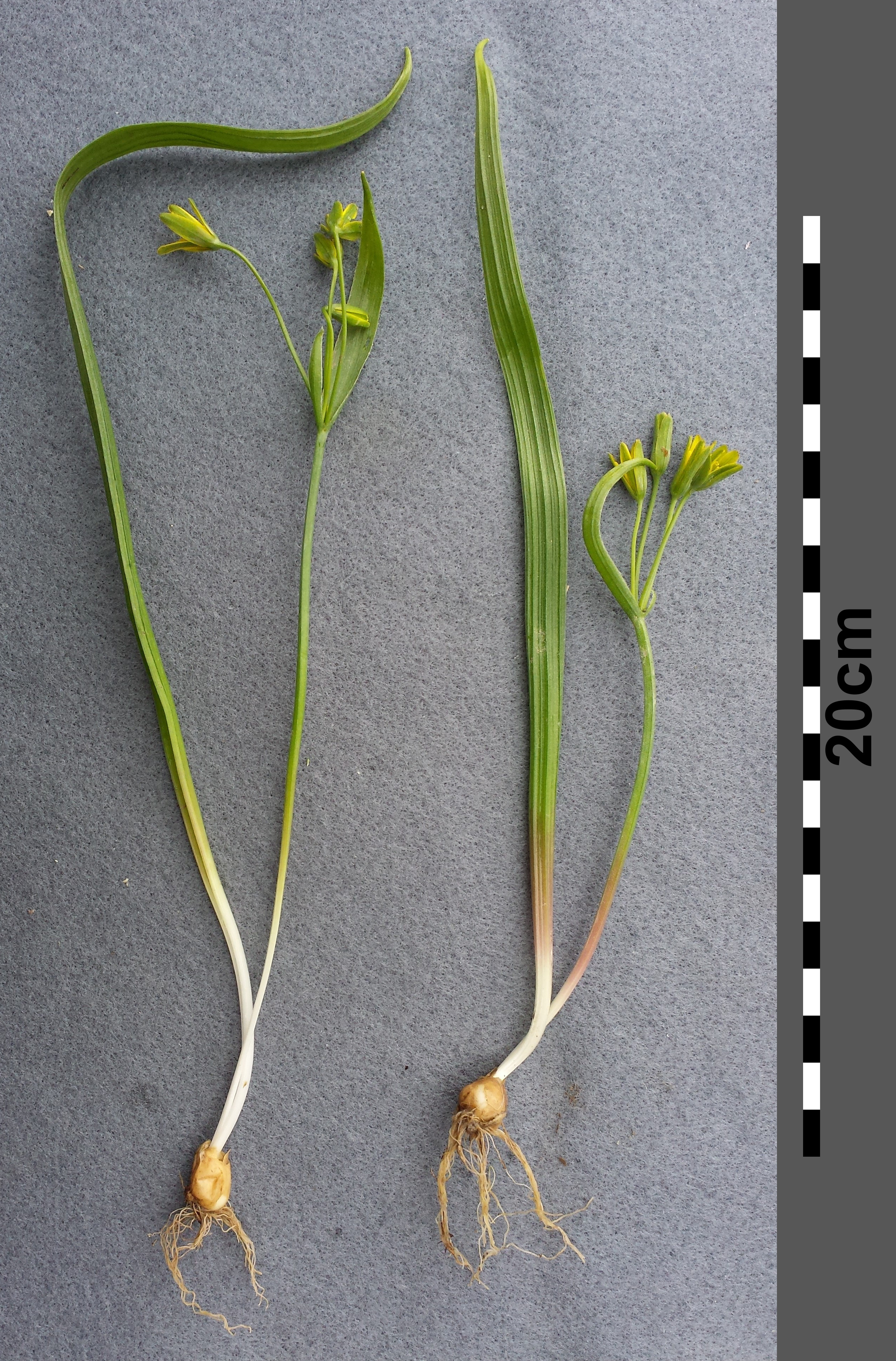
Gagea Lutea bulbous parts

The genus contains geophytes that use bulbous parts to survive unfavorable conditions and quickly reproduce during favorable conditions. Gagea species have persistent tepals, and are generally smaller in size than other closely related genera in the Liliaceae family.

The genus has varied leaf morphology. However, it is common for them to have basal leaves, some of which are cauline.

Some species have trichomes. These trichomes differ in their morphology. For instance, G. alberti and G. jensii have dendroid-type trichomes, but G. stepposa has glandular trichomes. It is also common for Gagea species to have amphistomatic stomata.

== Reproduction ==
Gagea use two separate reproductive systems, insect pollination and asexual bulbil reproduction. There are two patterns of bulbil reproduction. In a more "continuous" mode, the plant "turns on" the ability to make bulbils, and continues to do so, only needing 2–10 millimeters cubed of total plant volume to begin vegetative reproduction. Once it reaches 100–300 mm^{3} (0.0061–0.0183 cu in) of volume, in some species, like G. lutea, the plant stops bulbil reproduction to begin expending energy towards a flowering phenophase. In some species, like G. spathacea, the plant never stops bulbil reproduction, and has no ability to reproduce sexually (through flowering).

It is common for Gagea species begin flowering early into spring. Many Gagea are spring ephemerals, and need to complete their flowering cycles before tree cover re-emerges. By mid-spring to summer, these species will store themselves in bulbous parts underground in anticipation of the next flowering period.

== Speciation/Adaptations ==
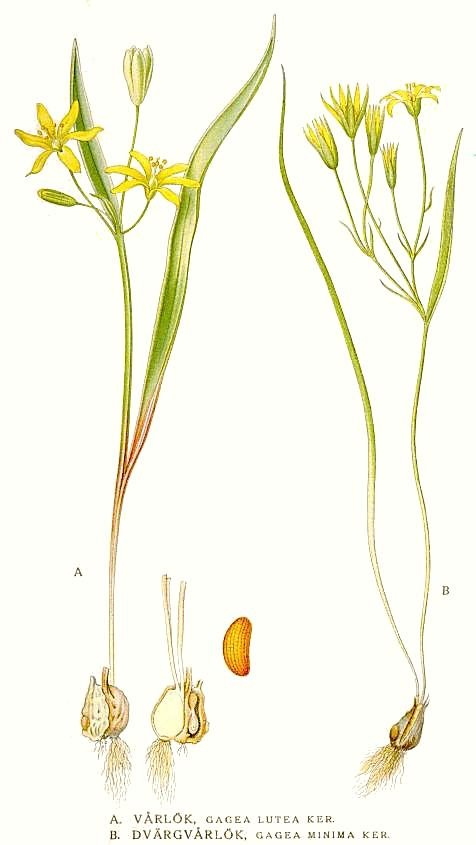
Gagea lutea fruit

During their flowering periods, species show different environmental adaptations based on their habitats. G. sect. Platayspermum Boiss live in more arid regions, where it is common for insects to feed upon any exposed fruits or seeds from flowering plants. Therefore, the sect. uses large, tough sepals to ward off insects attempting to consume its fruit when it is in its developing phase. Other sects, such as G. lutea, commonly emerge immediately after snowmelt. Unlike in more arid regions, these species will have greener sepals after the flower is fully open.

Polyploidy and hybridization, in the case of Gagea, have large impacts on its ability to undergo speciation, as evident in European species of the genus. Previous studies have shown that these two processes can significantly contribute to the process of speciation, while retaining fertility within a population. Gagea, therefore, has the ability to contain unique species such as G. spathacea, being a nonaploid that causes the plant to be limited in post-zygotic reproduction. The species has spread across Central Europe, the Caucasus, Sweden, Denmark, the Netherlands, and Belgium with little to no genetic differences due to its use of clonal reproduction. However, through polyploidy and hybridization events, it still retains the ability to undergo evolution.

== Species ==
As of January 2014, the World Checklist of Selected Plant Families recognizes over 200 species, including those previously assigned to Lloydia.

- Gagea afghanica A.Terracc. – Iran, Afghanistan, Central Asia
- Gagea aipetriensis Levichev – Crimea
- Gagea alashanica Y.Z.Zhao & L.Q.Zhao – Inner Mongolia
- Gagea alberti Regel – Xinjiang, Kazakhstan, Kyrgyzstan
- Gagea alexeenkoana Miscz. – Turkey, Iran, Caucasus
- Gagea alexejana Kamelin ex Levichev – Tajikistan
- Gagea alexii Ali & Levichev – Tajikistan, Iran, Pakistan
- Gagea algeriensis (Chabert) Chabert ex Batt. – Spain, Morocco, Algeria
- Gagea alii Levichev – Pakistan
- Gagea altaica Schischk. & Sumnev. – Xinjiang, Kazakhstan, Siberia
- Gagea amblyopetala Boiss. & Heldr. – southeastern Europe
- Gagea ancestralis Levichev – Altay Krai
- Gagea angelae Levichev & Schnittler – Xinjiang
- Gagea angrenica Levichev – Tajikistan
- Gagea anisopoda Popov – Turkmenistan
- Gagea artemczukii Krasnova – Ukraine, Russia (incl Crimea, North Caucasus).
- Gagea azutavica Kotukhov – Altay Krai
- Gagea baluchistanica Levichev & Ali – Pakistan
- Gagea baschkyzylsaica Levichev – Kyrgyzstan, Uzbekistan
- Gagea bashoensis Ali – Pakistan, Kashmir
- Gagea bergii Litv. – Iran, Afghanistan, Uzbekistan, Kazakhstan
- Gagea bezengiensis Levichev – North Caucasus
- Gagea bithynica Pascher – Turkey
- Gagea bohemica (Zauschn.) Schult. & Schult.f. (syn. G. fistulosa) – Early star-of-Bethlehem, Radnor lily – Europe, Mediterranean
- Gagea bornmuelleriana Pascher – Iran
- Gagea bowes-lyonii Levichev – Pakistan, Kashmir
- Gagea brevistolonifera Levichev – Kyrgyzstan
- Gagea bulbifera (Pall.) Salisb. – Eurasia from Romania to Xinjiang
- Gagea caelestis Levichev – Kyrgyzstan
- Gagea calantha Levichev – Uzbekistan
- Gagea calcicola Zarrei & Wilkin – Iran
- Gagea calyptrifolia Levichev – Kyrgyzstan
- Gagea capillifolia Vved. – Iran, Afghanistan, Central Asia
- Gagea capusii A.Terracc. – Afghanistan, Central Asia
- Gagea caroli-kochii Grossh. – Iran, South Caucasus
- Gagea chabertii A.Terracc. – Algeria, Tunisia
- Gagea chanae Grossh. – Iran, Turkey, Caucasus
- Gagea charadzeae Davlian. – Caucasus
- Gagea chinensis Y.Z.Zhao & L.Q.Zhao – Inner Mongolia
- Gagea chitralensis S.Dasgupta & D.B.Deb – Kyrgyzstan, Tajikistan, Pakistan
- Gagea chlorantha (M.Bieb.) Schult. & Schult.f. – Middle East, Turkmenistan, Caucasus
- Gagea chloroneura Rech.f. – Afghanistan
- Gagea chomutovae (Pascher) Pascher – Turkey, Caucasus, Iran, Afghanistan, Central Asia
- Gagea chrysantha (Jan) Schult. & Schult.f. – Italy incl Sicily
- Gagea circumplexa Vved. – Middle East, Central Asia
- Gagea commutata K.Koch – Caucasus, Iran
- Gagea confusa A.Terracc. – Iran, Iraq, Turkey, Caucasus, Turkmenistan
- Gagea cuneata Levichev & Murtaz. – North Caucasus
- Gagea czatkalica Levichev – Uzbekistan
- Gagea daghestanica Levichev & Murtaz. – North Caucasus
- Gagea daqingshanensis L.Q.Zhao & Jie Yang – Inner Mongolia
- Gagea davlianidzeae Levichev Kyrgyzstan
- Gagea dayana Chodat & Beauverd – Middle East
- Gagea delicatula Vved. – Uzbekistan, Tajikistan
- Gagea deserticola Levichev – Uzbekistan
- Gagea divaricata Regel – Xinjiang, Central Asia
- Gagea drummondii Levichev & Ali – Pakistan, Kashmir
- Gagea dschungarica Regel – Xinjiang, Central Asia, Pakistan, Afghanistan, Iran
- Gagea dubia A.Terracc. – Mediterranean, Iran
- Gagea durieui Parl. ex Trab. – Morocco, Algeria, Spain incl Balearic Islands
- Gagea eleonorae Levichev – Turkey, Caucasus
- Gagea elliptica (A.Terracc.) Prain – Spain, Portugal, Morocco
- Gagea exilis Vved. – Iran, Afghanistan, Kyrgyzstan, Tajikistan
- Gagea extremadurensis M.Gut. & F.M.Vázquez – Spain
- Gagea fedtschenkoana Pascher – Mongolia, Xinjiang, Kazakhstan, Siberia
- Gagea ferganica Levichev – Kyrgyzstan, Tajikistan, Uzbekistan
- Gagea fibrosa (Desf.) Schult. & Schult.f. – North Africa
- Gagea filiformis (Ledeb.) Kar. & Kir. – Altay Krai, Central Asia, Xinjiang, Mongolia, Afghanistan, Pakistan
- Gagea flavonutans (H.Hara) Zarrei & Wilkin – Tibet, Nepal, Sikkim, Bhutan, Assam
- Gagea foliosa (C.Presl) Schult. & Schult.f. – France, Italy, Algeria
- Gagea gageoides (Zucc.) Vved. – Caucasus, Middle East, Central Asia
- Gagea germainae Grossh. – Caucasus
- Gagea glacialis K.Koch – Caucasus, Turkey
- Gagea glaucescens Levichev – Kyrgyzstan
- Gagea goljakovii Levichev – Altay Krai
- Gagea gracillima Pamp. – Kashmir
- Gagea graeca (L.) Irmsch. – Greece, Turkey, Cyprus, Israel
- Gagea graminifolia Vved. – Iran, Afghanistan, Central Asia
- Gagea granatellii (Parl.) Parl. – Mediterranean, Black Sea regions
- Gagea granulosa Turcz. – Russia, Kazakhstan, Xinjiang, Mongolia
- Gagea grey-wilsonii Rech.f. – Iran
- Gagea gymnopoda Vved. – Tajikistan, Uzbekistan
- Gagea gypsacea Levichev – Tajikistan
- Gagea helenae Grossh. – Turkey, Caucasus
- Gagea hiensis Pascher – Russia, China, Korea, Mongolia
- Gagea hissarica Lipsky – Afghanistan, Central Asia
- Gagea humicola Levichev – Uzbekistan
- Gagea huochengensis Levichev – Xinjiang
- Gagea ignota Levichev – Uzbekistan
- Gagea incrustata Vved. – Uzbekistan, Tajikistan
- Gagea intercedens Pascher – Iran
- Gagea iranica Zarrei & Zarre – Iran
- Gagea jaeschkei Pascher – Xinjiang, Central Asia, Afghanistan, Pakistan, Western Himalayas
- Gagea japonica Pascher – Japan
- Gagea jensii Levichev & Schnittler – Xinjiang
- Gagea jispensis Ali & Levichev – Western Himalayas
- Gagea joannis Grossh. – Turkey, Caucasus
- Gagea juliae Pascher – Turkey, Cyprus
- Gagea kamelinii Levichev – Uzbekistan
- Gagea kneissea J.Thiébaut – Syria
- Gagea kopetdagensis Vved. – Turkmenistan
- Gagea kunawurensis (Royle) Greuter – central + southwest Asia
- Gagea kuraiensis Levichev – Altay Krai
- Gagea kuraminica Levichev – Tajikiistan
- Gagea lacaitae A.Terracc. – France, Spain, Italy, Algeria, Morocco
- Gagea leosii Ali & Levichev – Western Himalayas
- Gagea libanotica (Hochst.) Greuter. – Syria, Lebanon, Israel
- Gagea liotardii (Sternb.) Schult. & Schult.f. – Eurasia from Spain to Mongolia
- Gagea lojaconoi Peruzzi – Sicily, Sardinia, Turkey
- Gagea longiscapa Grossh. – Siberia, Prinorye
- Gagea ludmilae Levichev – Uzbekistan
- Gagea lusitanica A.Terracc. – Spain, Portugal
- Gagea lutea (L.) Ker Gawl. – Yellow Star-of-Bethlehem – Eurasia from Spain to Japan
- Gagea luteoides Stapf – Caucasus, Middle East
- Gagea maeotica Artemczuk – Ukraine, Russia incl North Caucasus
- Gagea marchica Henker – Germany
- Gagea mauritanica Durieu – France, Italy, Balearic Islands, Algeria
- Gagea menitskyi Levichev – Iran, South Caucasus
- Gagea mergalahensis Ali & Levichev – Western Himalayas, Pakistan
- Gagea michaelis Golosk. – Kazakhstan, Kyrgyzstan
- Gagea micrantha (Boiss.) Pascher – Lebanon, Syria
- Gagea minima (L.) Ker Gawl. – Europe, Caucasus
- Gagea minutiflora Regel – Central Asia
- Gagea minutissima Vved. – Tajikiistan
- Gagea multipedunculifera Levichev – Kyrgyzstan
- Gagea nabievii Levichev – Uzbekistan
- Gagea nakaiana Kitag. – eastern + central Asia, Himalayas
- Gagea neopopovii Golosk. – Kazakhstan, Xinjiang
- Gagea nevadensis Boiss. – Spain, Morocco
- Gagea noltiei Peruzzi. syn Lloydia delicatula – Nepal, Sikkim, Bhutan
- Gagea novoascanica Klokov – Ukraine
- Gagea olgae Regel – Iran, Afghanistan, Pakistan, Central Asia, Xinjiang
- Gagea paedophila Vved. – Tajikiistan, Afghanistan
- Gagea pakistanica Levichev & Ali – Western Himalayas, Pakistan
- Gagea paniculata Levichev – Uzbekistan
- Gagea pauciflora (Turcz. ex Trautv.) Ledeb. – Asiatic Russia, China, Mongolia
- Gagea pedata Levichev – Kyrgyzstan
- Gagea peduncularis (C.Presl) Pascher – Mediterranean
- Gagea podolica Schult. & Schult.f. – Russia, Ukraine
- Gagea polymorpha Boiss. – Spain
- Gagea popovii Vved. – Central Asia
- Gagea praemixta Vved. – Uzbekistan
- Gagea pratensis (Pers.) Dumort. – Meadow gagea – Europe, Morocco, Turkey
- Gagea pseudominutiflora Levichev – Kazakhstan, Kyrgyzstan
- Gagea punjabica Levichev & Ali – Western Himalayas, Pakistan
- Gagea pusilla (F.W.Schmidt) Sweet – Europe, Kazakhstan
- Gagea quasitenuifolia Levichev – Caucasus, Iran, Turkmenistan, Afghanistan, Uzbekistan
- Gagea quettica Levichev & Ali – Pakistan
- Gagea ramulosa A.Terracc. – eastern Mediterranean, Black Sea region
- Gagea rawalpindica Levichev & Ali – Pakistan
- Gagea reinhardii Levichev – Uzbekistan
- Gagea reticulata (Pall.) Schult. & Schult.f. SE Europe, N Africa, SW Asia
- Gagea reverchonii Degen – Spain
- Gagea rigida Boiss. & Spruner – Middle East, eastern Mediterranean
- Gagea robusta Zarrei & Wilkin – Iran, Afghanistan
- Gagea rubicunda Meinsh. – Russia, Baltic Republics
- Gagea rubinae Ali – Pakistan
- Gagea rufidula Levichev – Kyrgyzstan
- Gagea rupicola Levichev – Uzbekistan
- Gagea sarmentosa K.Koch – Caucasus, Iran
- Gagea sarysuensis Murz. – Kazakhstan
- Gagea schachimardanica Levichev – Uzbekistan
- Gagea schugnanica Levichev & Navruzsh. – Tajikistan
- Gagea scythica Artemczuk – Russia, Ukraine
- Gagea serotina (L.) Ker Gawl. – Arctic + Subarctic Eurasia + North America
- Gagea setifolia Baker – Caucasus, Iran, Afghanistan, Pakistan, Himalayas, Tajikistan, Kazakhstan
- Gagea shmakoviana Levichev – Altay Krai
- Gagea sicula Lojac. – Sicily
- Gagea siphonantha Rech.f. – Afghanistan
- Gagea sivasica Hamzaoglu – Turkey
- Gagea soleirolii F.W.Schultz – Spain, France, Portugal, Sardinia
- Gagea spathacea (Hayne) Salisb. – Europe
- Gagea spumosa Levichev – Pakistan, Tajikistan, Kyrgyzstan
- Gagea staintonii Rech.f. – Afghanistan, Pakistan
- Gagea stepposa L.Z.Shue – Xinjiang
- Gagea subtilis Vved. – Tajikistan, Kyrgyzstan, Uzbekistan
- Gagea subtrigona J.-M.Tison – Spain, Morocco
- Gagea sulfurea Miscz. – Turkey, Caucasus
- Gagea tadshikistanica Levichev – Tajikistan
- Gagea takhtajanii Levichev – Uzbekistan
- Gagea talassica Levichev – Kyrgyzstan
- Gagea taschkentica Levichev – Uzbekistan
- Gagea taurica Steven – Crimea, North Caucasus
- Gagea tenera Pascher – central + southwest Asia, Xinjiang, Himalayas
- Gagea tenuissima Miscz. – Caucasus, Turkey
- Gagea tesquicola Krasnova – Ukraine
- Gagea tisoniana Peruzzi – Italy
- Gagea toktogulii Levichev – Kyrgyzstan
- Gagea toppinii S.Dasgupta & D.B.Deb – Pakistan
- Gagea transversalis (Pall.) Steven – eastern Europe
- Gagea triflora (Ledeb.) Schult. & Schult.f. – Russian Far East, Korea, Japan, northeastern China
- Gagea trinervia (Viv.) Greuter – Sicily, Libya
- Gagea turanica Levichev – South Caucasus, Iran, Afghanistan, Turkmenistan, Uzbekistan
- Gagea ucrainica Klokov – Ukraine, Russia, Xinjiang, Mongolia
- Gagea ugamica Pavlov – Kazakhstan
- Gagea ulazsaica Levichev – Kazakhstan, Uzbekistan
- Gagea uliginosa Siehe & Pascher – Iran, Iraq, Turkey
- Gagea utriculosa Levichev – Himachal Pradesh
- Gagea vaginata Pascher – Kuril Islands, Hokkaido
- Gagea vegeta Vved. – Kyrgyzstan, Tajikistan, Afghanistan, Iran, Caucasus
- Gagea villosa (M.Bieb.) Sweet – Field Gagea – Europe, Mediterranean, Middle East
- Gagea villosula Vved. – Tajikistan
- Gagea vvedenskyi Grossh. – Central Asia, Afghanistan, Pakistan
- Gagea wallichii Levichev & Ali – Western Himalaya
- Gagea wendelboi Rech.f. – Iran
- Gagea xiphoidea Levichev – Altay Krai

== Bibliography ==
- Heimer, V., Carnicero, P., Carrizo García, C., Hilpold, A., Dolenc Koce, J., Leal, J. L., Li, M., Varotto, C., Schönswetter, P., & Frajman, B. (2025). Hybridization and Polyploidy Shaped the Evolutionary History of a Complex of Cryptic Species in European Woodrushes (Luzula sect. Luzula). Systematic Biology. https://doi.org/10.1093/sysbio/syaf065
- M. Zarrei, Wilkin, P., Ingrouille, M. J., & Chase, M. W. (2011). A revised infrageneric classification for Gagea Salisb (Tulipeae; Liliaceae): insights from DNA sequence and morphological data. Phytotaxa, 15(1), 44–56. https://doi.org/10.11646/phytotaxa.15.1.6
- Peterson, A., Levichev, I. G., & Peterson, J. (2008). Systematics of Gagea and Lloydia (Liliaceae) and infrageneric classification of Gagea based on molecular and morphological data. Molecular Phylogenetics and Evolution, 46(2), 446–465. https://doi.org/10.1016/j.ympev.2007.11.016
- Pfeiffer, T., Klahr, A., Peterson, A., Levichev, I. G., & Schnittler, M. (2012). No sex at all? Extremely low genetic diversity in Gagea spathacea (Liliaceae) across Europe. Flora - Morphology, Distribution, Functional Ecology of Plants, 207(5), 372–378. https://doi.org/10.1016/j.flora.2012.03.002
- Qiu, J., Lin, M., & Tan, D. (2023). Taxonomic implications of leaf morphology and epidermal anatomy for 14 species of Gagea (Liliaceae) from Xinjiang, China. Botanical Studies, 64(1). https://doi.org/10.1186/s40529-023-00405-9
- Schnittler, M., Nursafina, A., Peterson, A., Peterson, J., Barnick, C., & Klahr, A. (2017). Studies of life history of Gagea graeca (Liliaceae) based on morphological and molecular methods. Botanical Studies, 58(1). https://doi.org/10.1186/s40529-017-0194-6
- Schnittler, M., Peterson, A., Peterson, J., Beisenova, S., Bersimbaev, R. I., & Pfeiffer, T. (2013). Minor differences with big consequences: Reproductive patterns in the genus Gagea (Liliaceae). Flora - Morphology, Distribution, Functional Ecology of Plants, 208(10-12), 591–598. https://doi.org/10.1016/j.flora.2013.09.002
- Schnittler, M., Pfeiffer, T., Harter, D., & Hamann, A. (2009). Bulbils contra seeds: reproductive investment in two species of Gagea (Liliaceae). Plant Systematics and Evolution, 279(1-4), 29–40. https://doi.org/10.1007/s00606-008-0143-7
- Sunmonu, N., & Kudo, G. (2015). Warm temperature conditions restrict the sexual reproduction and vegetative growth of the spring ephemeral Gagea lutea (Liliaceae). Plant Ecology, 216(10), 1419–1431. https://eprints.lib.hokudai.ac.jp/repo/huscap/all/63014/
- Tison, J.-M., Peterson, A., Dörte Harpke, & Peruzzi, L. (2012). Reticulate evolution of the critical Mediterranean Gagea sect. Didymobulbos (Liliaceae) and its taxonomic implications. Plant Systematics and Evolution, 299(2), 413–438. https://doi.org/10.1007/s00606-012-0731-4
