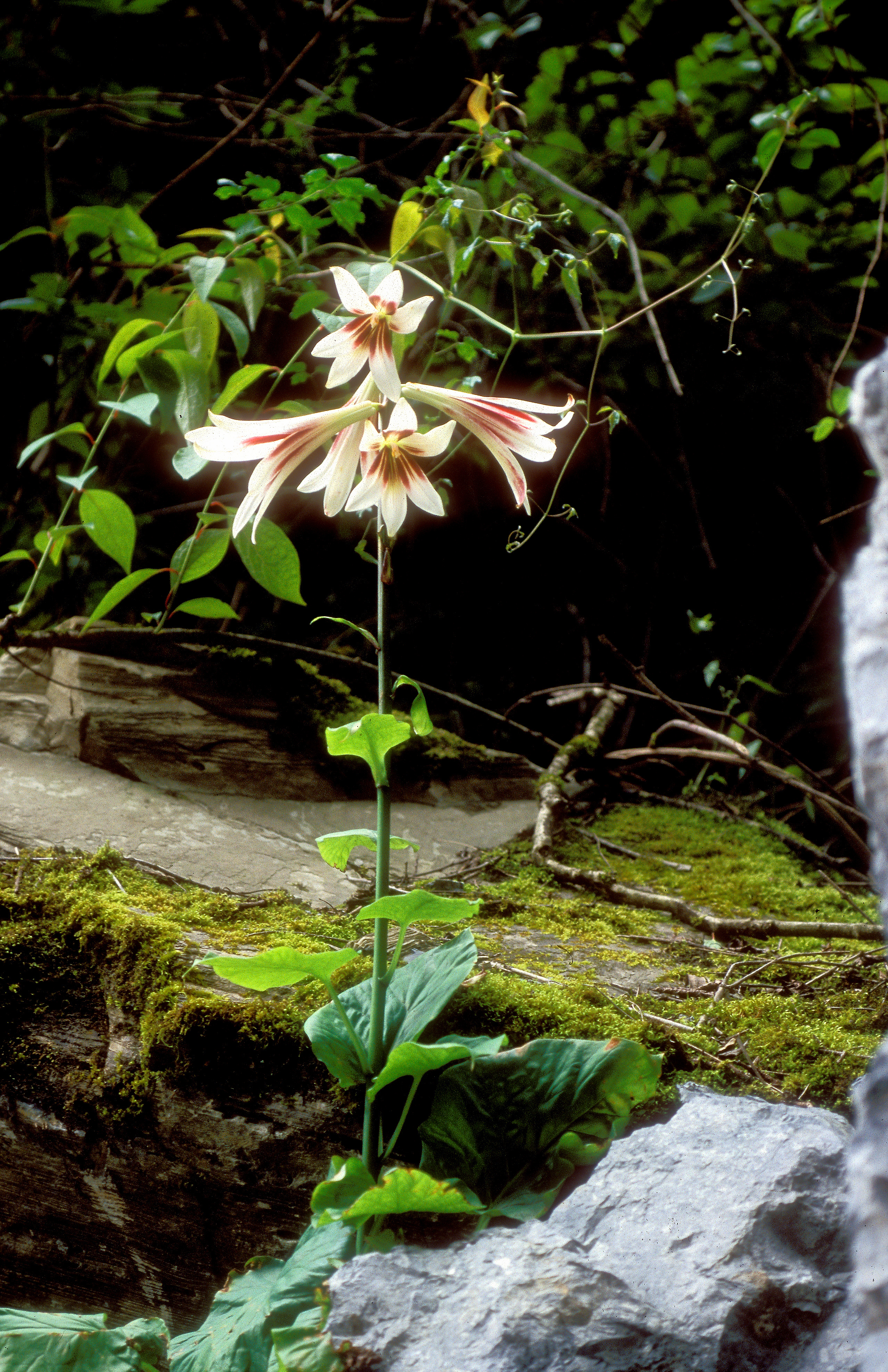
- Cardiocrinum giganteum

Scientific classification
- Kingdom: Plantae
- Clade: Embryophytes
- Clade: Tracheophytes
- Clade: Spermatophytes
- Clade: Angiosperms
- Clade: Monocots
- Order: Liliales
- Family: Liliaceae
- Subfamily: Lilioideae; Eaton

Genera
- Tribe: Medeoleae; Clintonia; Medeola; Tribe: Lilieae; Cardiocrinum; Erythronium; Fritillaria; Gagea; Lilium; Nomocharis; Notholirion; Tulipa

Synonyms
- Erythroniaceae Martynov; Fritillariaceae R.A.Salisbury; Liriaceae Batsch; Medeolaceae Takhtajan; Tulipaceae Batsch

= Lilioideae =

Subfamily of flowering plants

The Lilioideae are a subfamily of monocotyledonous perennial, herbaceous mainly bulbous flowering plants in the lily family, Liliaceae. They are found predominantly in the temperate and colder regions of the Northern Hemisphere, particularly East Asia and North America. The subfamily includes two tribes. They are of economic importance, particularly the lilies and tulips.

== Description ==
Lilioideae genera are relatively homogeneous and distinct from the other two Liliaceae subfamilies (Calochortoideae and Streptopoideae). They are perennial herbaceous flowering plants that are mainly bulbous (Lilieae) with contractile roots, but may be rhizomatous (Medeoleae). Stems unbranched, leaves with parallel venation. Flowers are large and showy. The embryo sac (megagametophyte) is of the Fritillaria-type (tetrasporic). Capsule septicidal, seeds often flattened, exotesta palisaded or lignified. The seeds of Medeoleae are striate. Chromosome number may be 7 (Medeoleae), 9, or 11–14, with a highly variable length (2.2 - 27 μm).

== Taxonomy ==
The term was introduced by Amos Eaton in his Botanical Dictionary in 1836. Engler and Prantl included it as one of the eleven subfamilies of Liliaceae. In 1927, Buxbaum's treatment of the subfamily included three tribes; Lloydieae (Gagea, Lloydia and Szechenya and Giradiella — both now included in Lloydia), Tulipeae: (Erythronium, Tulipa and Eduardoregalia — now part of Tulipa) and Lilieae (Korolkowia, Fritillaria, Notholirion, Cardiocrinum, Nomocharis and Lilium).

In the phylogenetic era, the subfamily Lilioideae has been circumscribed in both a broad (sensu lato, or s.l.) and narrow (sensu stricto, or s.s.) sense. Tamura, and others have defined Lilioideae s.s. (or sensu Tamura) to include only the tribes Tulipeae and Lilieae. However other authorities including the Angiosperm Phylogeny Website (APWeb) define Lilioideae s.l. to also include the Medeoleae (while subsuming the Tulipae into Lilieae). In the s.s. usage, the Medeoleae are treated as a separate subfamily, the Medeoloideae.

=== Genera ===
The subfamily Lilioideae includes ten genera and about 535 species. The largest genera are Gagea (200), Fritillaria (130), Lilium (110), and Tulipa (75 species).

== Bibliography ==
- Buxbaum, F. (1936). "Die Entwicklungslinien der Lilioideae. I. Die systematische Stellung der gattung Gagea". Botanisches Archiv (in German). 38: 213–293.
- Buxbaum, F. (1937). "Die Entwicklungslinien der Lilioideae. II. Die Wurmbaeoideae". Botanisches Archiv (in German). 38: 305–398.* Tropicos: Lilioideae Eaton
- Eaton, Thomas (1836). Eaton's botanical grammar and dictionary, modernized down to 1836 (4th ed.). Albany: Oliver Steele.
- Engler, Adolf (1903). Syllabus der Pflanzenfamilien : eine Übersicht über das gesamte Pflanzensystem mit Berücksichtigung der Medicinal- und Nutzpflanzen nebst einer Übersicht über die Florenreiche und Florengebiete der Erde zum Gebrauch bei Vorlesungen und Studien über specielle und medicinisch-pharmaceutische Botanik. Vol. Teil 2, Abt. 1-6. Berlin: Borntraeger.
- Schnarf, Karl (September 1948). "Der Umfang der Lilioideae im natürlichen System". Österreichische Botanische Zeitschrift. 95 (3). Wien: Springer: 257–269. Bibcode:1948PSyEv..95..257S. doi:10.1007/BF01249968. ISSN 0378-2697. S2CID 37967024.
- Tamura, M. N. (1998-08-27). "Liliaceae". Flowering Plants · Monocotyledons. pp. 343–353. doi:10.1007/978-3-662-03533-7_41. ISBN 9783540640608. In Kubitzki & Huber (1998).
- Kubitzki, Klaus; Huber, Herbert, eds. (1998). The families and genera of vascular plants. Vol.3. Flowering plants. Monocotyledons: Lilianae (except Orchidaceae). Berlin, Germany: Springer-Verlag. ISBN 3-540-64060-6.
- Patterson, T. B.; Givnish, T. J. (2002). "Phylogeny, concerted convergence, and phylogenetic niche conservatism in the core Liliales: insights from rbcL and ndhF sequence data". Evolution. 56 (2): 233–252. doi:10.1111/j.0014-3820.2002.tb01334.x. PMID 11926492.
- Stevens, P.F. (2015) [1st. Pub. 2001], Angiosperm Phylogeny Website, Missouri Botanical Garden
- Media related to Lilioideae at Wikimedia Commons
- Data related to Lilioideae at Wikispecies
