= List of Lilium species =

There are 119 accepted species of Lilium according to Plants of the World Online. Those species are listed here, with ranges sourced from World Plants.

== List ==
- Lilium akkusianum — Turkey
- Lilium albanicum — Southeast Europe
- Lilium amabile — Northeast Asia
- Lilium amoenum — Yunnan
- Lilium apertum — Myanmar, Tibet
- Lilium arboricola — Myanmar
- Lilium armenum — Turkey, Caucasus
- Lilium assamicum — Assam
- Lilium auratum — Japan
- Lilium bakerianum — Southeast Asia
- Lilium basilissum — Myanmar, Yunnan
- Lilium bolanderi — Western US
- Lilium bosniacum — Dinaric Alps
- Lilium brevistylum — Tibet
- Lilium brownii — China, southeast Asia
- Lilium buchenavii — Lower Saxony
- Lilium bulbiferum — Europe
- Lilium callosum — Northeast Asia
- Lilium canadense — Eastern North America
- Lilium candidum — Southeast Europe, Middle East
- Lilium carniolicum — Alps
- Lilium catesbaei — Southeast US
- Lilium cernuum — Northeast Asia
- Lilium chalcedonicum — Southeast Europe
- Lilium ciliatum — Turkey
- Lilium columbianum — Western North America
- Lilium concolor — Northeast Asia
- Lilium davidii — China, Himalayas
- Lilium debile — Russian Far East
- Lilium distichum — Northeast Asia
- Lilium duchartrei — China, southeast Asia
- Lilium eupetes — Vietnam
- Lilium fargesii — China
- Lilium floridum — Liaoning
- Lilium formosanum — Taiwan
- Lilium georgei — Myanmar
- Lilium gongshanense — Yunnan
- Lilium grayi — Appalachian Mountains
- Lilium hansonii — South Korea, Japan
- Lilium henrici — Sichuan, Yunnan
- Lilium henryi — China
- Lilium humboldtii — California, Baja California
- Lilium iridollae — Southeastern US
- Lilium jankae — Balkans
- Lilium japonicum — Japan
- Lilium kelleyanum — Southwestern US
- Lilium kelloggii — Southwestern US
- Lilium kesselringianum — Turkey, Caucasus
- Lilium lalashanense — Taiwan
- Lilium lancifolium — Northeast Asia
- Lilium lankongense — Tibet, Yunnan
- Lilium ledebourii — Middle East
- Lilium leichtlinii — Northeast Asia
- Lilium leucanthum — China
- Lilium linearifolianum — Taiwan
- Lilium longiflorum — Japan, Taiwan, Philippines
- Lilium lophophorum — China
- Lilium mackliniae — India, Myanmar
- Lilium maculatum — Japan
- Lilium maritimum — California
- Lilium martagon — Eurasia
- Lilium matangense — Sichuan
- Lilium medeoloides — Northeast Asia
- Lilium medogense — Tibet
- Lilium meleagrina — Tibet
- Lilium michauxii — Southeastern US
- Lilium michiganense — Central North America
- Lilium monadelphum — Crimea, Caucasus, Turkey
- Lilium nanum — Himalayas, South Asia
- Lilium nepalense — Himalayas
- Lilium nobilissimum — Ryukyu Islands
- Lilium occidentale — Southwestern US
- Lilium oxypetalum — Himalayas
- Lilium papilliferum — China
- Lilium paradoxum — Tibet
- Lilium pardalinum — Southwestern US, Baja California
- Lilium pardanthinum — Myanmar, southern China
- Lilium parryi — Southern US, Mexico
- Lilium parvum — Southern US
- Lilium pensylvanicum — Northeast Asia
- Lilium philadelphicum — US, Canada
- Lilium philippinense — Taiwan, Philippines
- Lilium pinifolium — Yunnan
- Lilium polyphyllum — Afghanistan, South Asia
- Lilium pomponium — Alps
- Lilium ponticum — Turkey, Caucasus
- Lilium primulinum — Southeast Asia, southern China, northwest India
- Lilium procumbens — Vietnam
- Lilium pumilum — Northeast Asia
- Lilium punctulatum — Yunnan
- Lilium pyi — Yunnan
- Lilium pyrenaicum — Iberia
- Lilium pyrophilum — Southeastern US
- Lilium regale — Sichuan
- Lilium rhodopeum — Southeastern Europe
- Lilium rosthornii — China
- Lilium rubellum — Honshu
- Lilium rubescens — California
- Lilium saluenense — Tibet, Myanmar
- Lilium sargentiae — Southern China
- Lilium sealyi — Yunnan, Myanmar
- Lilium sempervivoideum — Southern China
- Lilium sherriffiae — Bhutan, Sikkim, Nepal
- Lilium souliei — Southern China, Arunachal Pradesh, Myanmar
- Lilium speciosum — Northeast Asia
- Lilium stewartianum — Yunnan
- Lilium sulphureum — Myanmar, China, Bangladesh
- Lilium superbum — Eastern US
- Lilium synapticum — Arunachal Pradesh
- Lilium szovitsianum — Turkey, Caucasus
- Lilium taliense — Southern China
- Lilium tenii — Southern China
- Lilium tianschanicum — Xinjiang
- Lilium tsingtauense — Northeast Asia
- Lilium ukeyuri — Ryukyu Islands
- Lilium wallichianum — Himalayas
- Lilium wardii — Tibet
- Lilium washingtonianum — Southwestern US
- Lilium yapingense — Yunnan
