= L. maritimum =

L. maritimum may refer to:

- Lilium maritimum, the coast lily, a plant species endemic to California
- Litopleura maritimum, a synonym for Limnomedusa macroglossa

== See also ==
- Maritimum (disambiguation)
