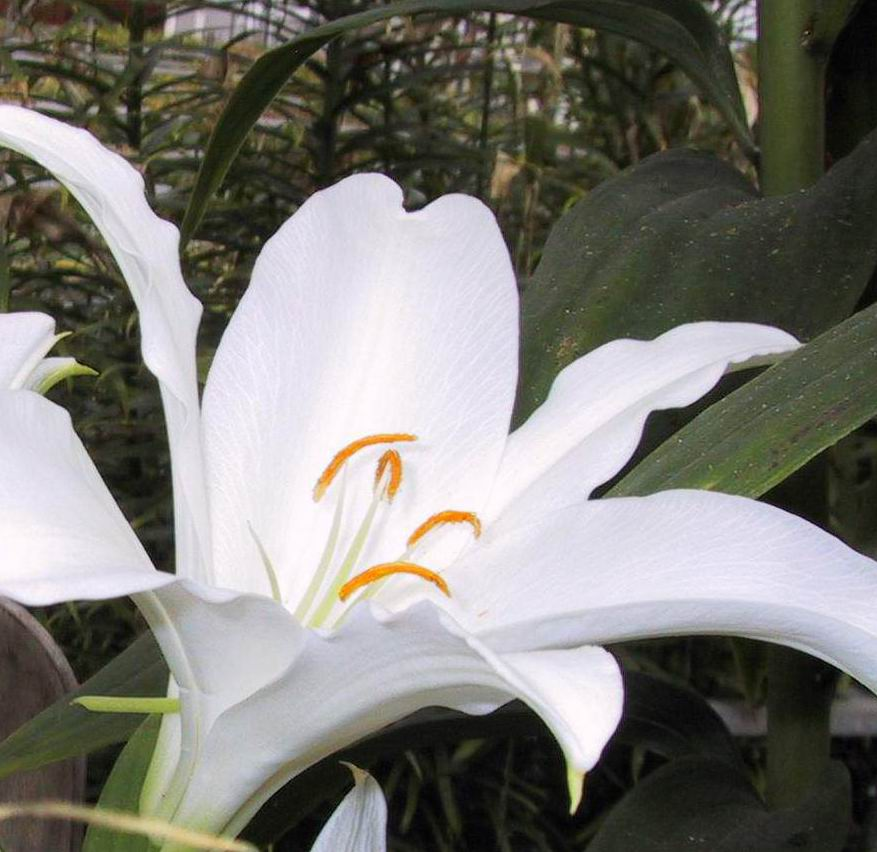
- Lilium nobilissimum flowering

Scientific classification
- Kingdom: Plantae
- Clade: Tracheophytes
- Clade: Angiosperms
- Clade: Monocots
- Order: Liliales
- Family: Liliaceae
- Subfamily: Lilioideae
- Genus: Lilium
- Species: L. nobilissimum

Binomial name
- Lilium nobilissimum (Makino) Makino

Synonyms
- Lilium japonicum f. nobilissimum Makino; Lilium japonicum var. nobilissimum (Makino) Matsumura; Lilium speciosum var. tomotojuri Siebold

= Lilium nobilissimum =

Species of plant

Lilium nobilissimum is a species of plant in the lily family Liliaceae. Endemic to the island of Kuchinoshima in Japan's Kagoshima Prefecture, it grows on the cliffs of the southwestern portion of the island. In floral breeding circles, the plant was used for the production of upright oriental lilies. Lilium nobilissimum was first described as a form of Lilium japonicum by Tomitaro Makino in 1902; it was elevated to full species status in 1914.

Known to the Japanese under the name tamoto-yuri, the name may either denote the sleeves that were used to hold the lily as they were harvested from their cliffside habitat or that the native habitat was close to a locale called Tamotogaura (袂ケ浦). The lilies served as a historical tribute to the Satsuma Domain, which presented the emperor with 12 stalks of the plant yearly. On September 7, 1953, it was designated a prefectural natural monument by the government of Kagoshima Prefecture.

== Description ==
Lilium nobilissimum is a bulbous geophyte, a perennial plant that is propagated from an underground storage organ. The bulb of the plant is ovoid or globose, with white or yellowish-white scales. The bulb has a diameter of 6.5 centimetres (2.6 in), with overall dimensions of 5–8 by 5–8 centimetres (2.0 in–3.1 in × 2.0 in–3.1 in).

The leaves are entire with the leaf margins smooth and scattered. They are broad-lanceolate, shortly petiolate, oblong, or oval in shape. The leaves are around 18 centimetres (7.1 in) in length, or with overall dimensions of 18–20 by 4–6 centimetres (7.1 in–7.9 in × 1.6 in–2.4 in). There are five to seven veins on the leaves, with the colouration being green on the adaxial, or upper side, and paler green on the abaxial, lower side. The stem is 40–70 centimetres (16–28 in), purplish or light green in colour. Bulbils, smaller plants that grow from the parent plant's stem, grow out of the leaf axils. The plant grows up to a height of 60–70 centimetres (24–28 in).

Up to seven flowers grow on a single plant and point upwards. The flowers are bowl-shaped (cupuliform) or trumpet-shaped (broadly tubular), with a waxy texture and fragrant scented. The tepals are pure white in colour, with a greenish tint towards the base, with a dimensions of 12–14 by 3–4 centimetres (4.7 in–5.5 in × 1.2 in–1.6 in). The inner three are wider than the outer three, with the margins slightly wavy. Flowering occurs between July and September, the Kagoshima prefectural government gives a stricter flowering period between late June and July.

The stamens are hairless and straight, the filaments are green, with the anthers and pollen yellow. The style is green, with a broad stigma. The stigma is white to greenish, trilobate (bearing three lobes), and the lobes do not expand beyond the style's apex. The seeds engage in delayed hypogeal germination, meaning seed's germination takes place below the ground. The fruit is an oblong, egg-shaped capsule, deeply 6 ridged and between 3–5 centimetres (1.2–2.0 in) in length.

== Taxonomy ==
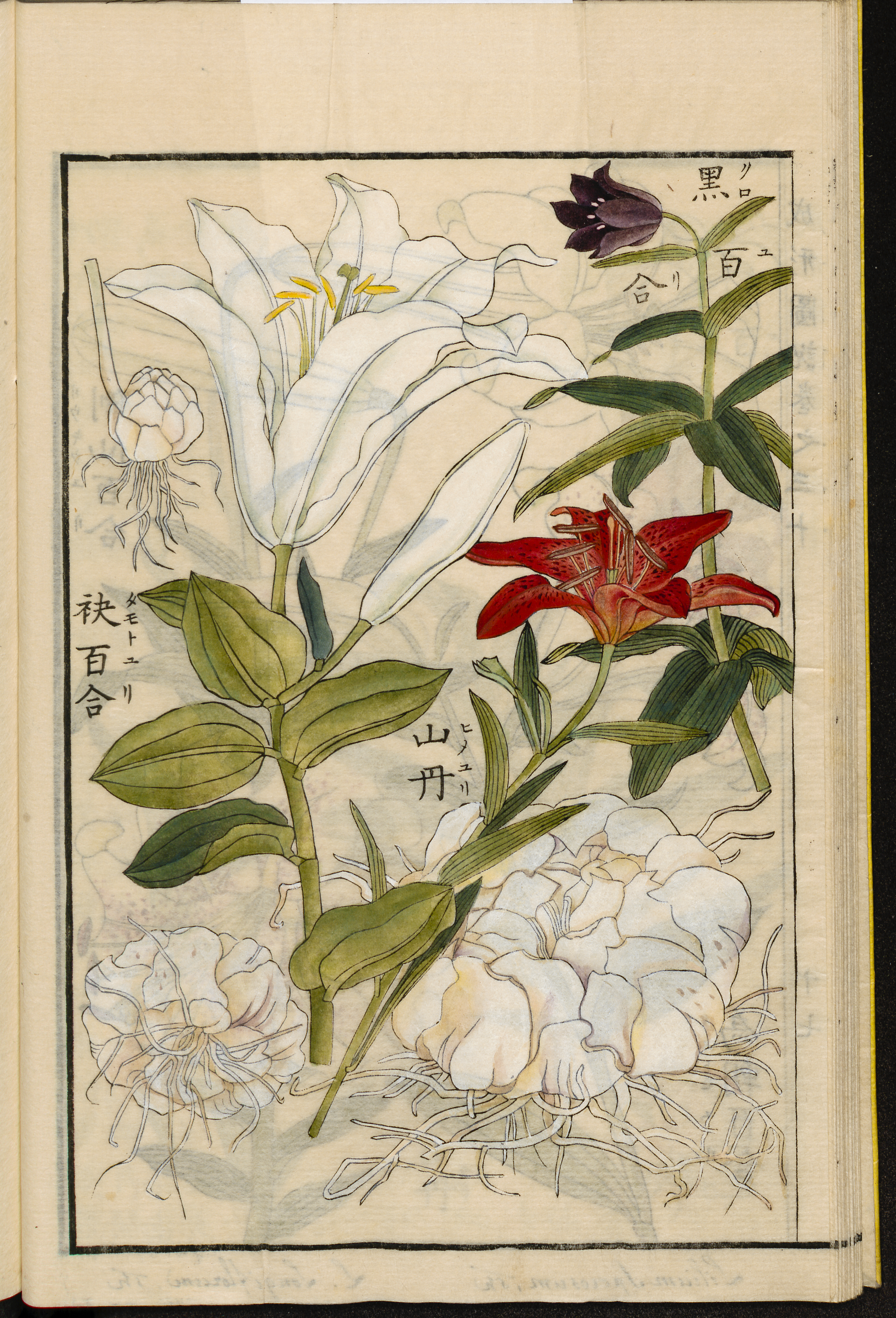
An illustration of Lilium nobilissimum labelled tamoto-yuri from the 1804 Seikei Zusetsu

Tomitaro Makino first described Lilium nobilissimum as Lilium japonicum var. alexandrae f. nobilissimum in 1902, which he would later elevate to genus rank in 1914. Makino noted several differences between it and alexandrae, with shorter stems, more ovate leaves, and fewer, more upright flowers. Ernest Henry Wilson would then combine L. nobilissimum and L. japonicum var. alexandrae under Lilium longiflorum, stating "Why Baker should have made it a variety of the totally different L. japonicum Thunb. I fail to understand." Arthur Grove compounded on Wilson's error, in his Lilies, he described a plant he termed L. alexandrae which was identified as a description of L. nobilissimum by James Compton. John Coutts, the curator of the Royal Botanic Gardens, Kew, raised L. japonicum var. alexandrae to full species rank, but followed Wilson's precedent by including L. nobilissimum as a synonym of the new L. alexandrae. In their supplement to Elwes' monograph, Grove and Cotton included L. japonicum var. alexandrae, L. longiflorum var. alexandrae, and L. ukeyuri under L. nobilissimum, amalgamating the plants found on the islands of Uke-shima and Kuchinoshima under a single species. It was only in 1950, when Koichiro Wada recognized the two genera as separate, with this reinforced by de Graaff in a publication for the Oregon Bulb Farms.

In Japan, it was first known in the scientific sphere from a description of it in the Kadan Chikinsho of 1696. It was first described as a variety of ukeyuri 1902, and then recognized as an independent species in 1914. A full-page illustration by Sekine Untai in 1845 served as a reference and a source for its naming.

Molecular studies on Lilium nobilissimum showed that Lilium alexandrae was a sister taxon within an unresolved clade in Lilium sect. Archelirion, alongside L. auratum, L. rubellum, L. auratum var. platyphyllum and L. speciosum var. clivorum.

== Distribution ==
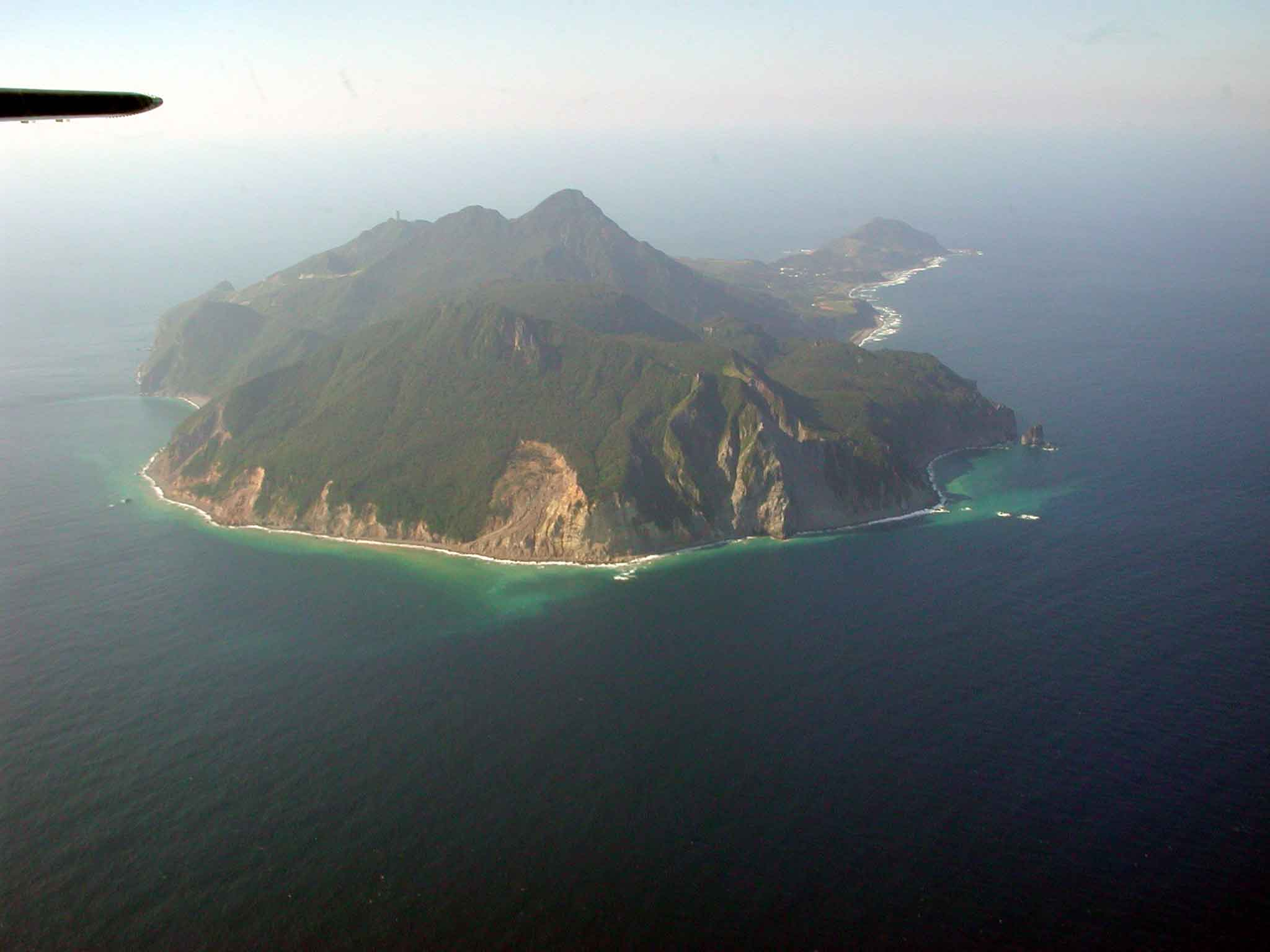
L. nobilissimum is found only on Kuchinoshima island

Lilium nobilissimum is exclusively found in Kuchinoshima in Japan's Ryukyu Islands (Kagoshima Prefecture). It grows on open meadows and sea cliffs between the elevations of 50–200 metres (160–660 ft) on the southwestern portion of the island.

== Human interactions ==
Lilium nobilissimum is often used for floral breeding for the production of upright oriental lilies with rich colours. The plants were first displayed for a Western horticultural audience in 1954, during the North American Lily Society show held in Canada. The plants are not winter-hardy, being best grown in a cool greenhouse, and are susceptible to Fusarium infection. Strong sunlight can cause burning of the leaves, and rain can leave it susceptible to Botrytis infection.

During the Edo period, the Satsuma Domain would present the emperor with 12 stalks of L. nobilissimum yearly. Information about the plant was kept hidden from outsiders, having only noted that it was grown on a southern island. Dubbed the "fragrant lily", at one point, the lily was overharvested following the Occupation of Japan and became extinct in the wild. The Tokara Islands were left poor following the war, and smugglers would arrive at the island offering high prices for the lily's bulbs. The islanders would react by harvesting the lilies as much as they could, with the youth taking lunch boxes and filling them with forty to fifty bulbs of the lily each. The lily survived through seeds that were saved by enthusiasts, with locals and researchers at Nagasaki University now undergoing a replanting program to ensure the species' continued survival. There are some who believe that the current strain of L. nobilissimum differ from the wild type.

On September 7, 1953, it was designated as a prefectural designated natural monument by the government of Kagoshima Prefecture. There it is called by the name tamoto-yuri. among other names such as temochi-yuri and tamotsu-yuri. There are two theories as to how the lily had received its name, one being that due to its native habitat being that of steep cliffs, the only way one could reliably transport them home was placing the bulbs in their kimono's sleeve pouches (袂, tamoto) while scaling the sea cliffs, and the other was that the native habitat was close to a locale called Tamotogaura (袂ケ浦). Another story has a defeated Heike warrior secretly bringing home a flower of the plant in his sleeve.
