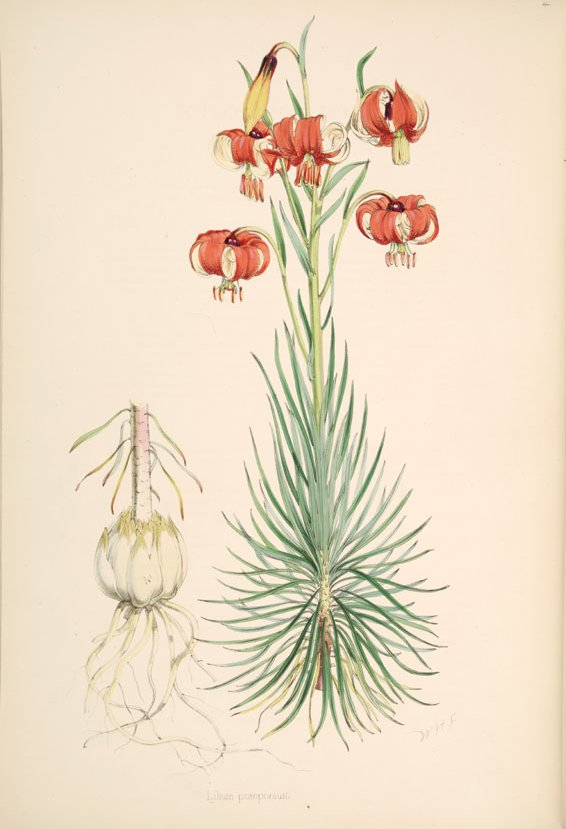
- 1880 illustration

Scientific classification
- Kingdom: Plantae
- Clade: Tracheophytes
- Clade: Angiosperms
- Clade: Monocots
- Order: Liliales
- Family: Liliaceae
- Subfamily: Lilioideae
- Tribe: Lilieae
- Genus: Lilium
- Species: L. pomponium

Binomial name
- Lilium pomponium L.

Synonyms
- Lilium angustifolium Mill.; Lilium rubrum Lam.; Lilium pomponicum Panz.

= Lilium pomponium =

Species of lily

Lilium pomponium, the turban lily, is a European species of lily native to France, Spain, and Italy.

formerly included

- Lilium pomponium var. carniolicum, now called Lilium carniolicum
- Lilium pomponium subsp. pyrenaicum, now called Lilium pyrenaicum
