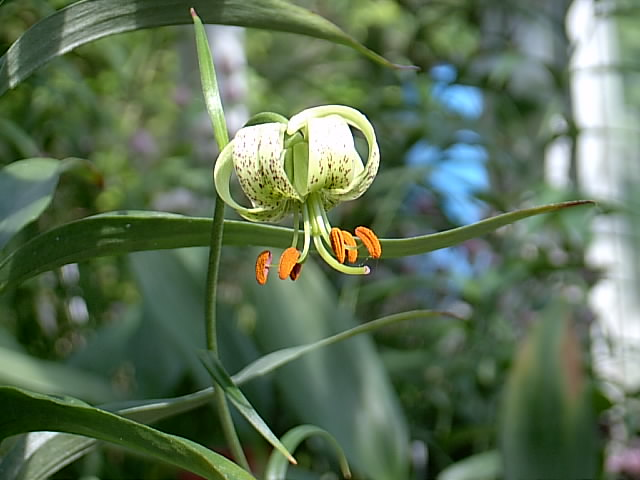
- Flower of Lilium fargesii

Scientific classification
- Kingdom: Plantae
- Clade: Tracheophytes
- Clade: Angiosperms
- Clade: Monocots
- Order: Liliales
- Family: Liliaceae
- Subfamily: Lilioideae
- Tribe: Lilieae
- Genus: Lilium
- Species: L. fargesii

Binomial name
- Lilium fargesii Franch

Synonyms
- Lilium cupreum H.Lév.

= Lilium fargesii =

Species of lily

Lilium fargesii is a Chinese species of plants in the lily family native to Hubei, Shaanxi, Sichuan and Yunnan provinces of China.

Lilium fargesii occurs naturally on the edge of woods in mountains at elevations of 1500–1800 meters. The plant grows 6–8 inches (15–20 cm) tall with a slim stem, long narrow leaves and surmounted by a raceme of 1–6 flowers. The flowers are Turk's cap in shape with broad reflexed petals of a greenish–white. The petals may be darker green at the edges but are spotted and marked all over with chestnut–brown dots. The flowers are fragrant. The bulb of Lilium fargesii is comparatively small at ¾ inch (1.5 cm) diameter. This lily flowers late in the summer from the end of July to August or September.

== Taxonomy ==
It is known as 'lu hua bai he' in China.

It was first described by Adrien René Franchet in 1892, and published in 'Journal de Botanique' (Morot) Issue 6( Vols.17–18) on pages 317–318. The Latin specific epithet fargesii refers to the French missionary and amateur botanist Père Paul Guillaume Farges (1844–1912).

Although it was discovered over 100 years ago it has only recently been known and available from horticultural centres.
