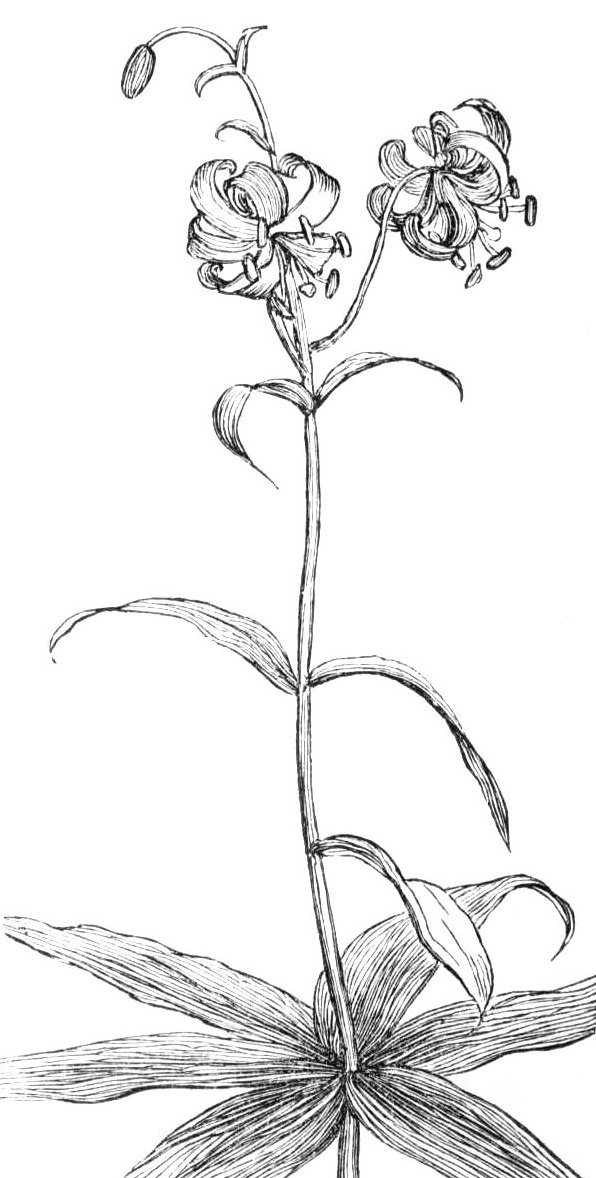
- 1858 illustration

Scientific classification
- Kingdom: Plantae
- Clade: Tracheophytes
- Clade: Angiosperms
- Clade: Monocots
- Order: Liliales
- Family: Liliaceae
- Subfamily: Lilioideae
- Tribe: Lilieae
- Genus: Lilium
- Species: L. debile

Binomial name
- Lilium debile Kittlitz 1828

= Lilium debile =

Species of lily

Lilium debile is a herbaceous plant of the lily family, native to the Russian Far East (Khabarovsk, Sakhalin, Kamchatka and the Kuril Islands). It is related to the taller and more widespread species Lilium medeoloides.
