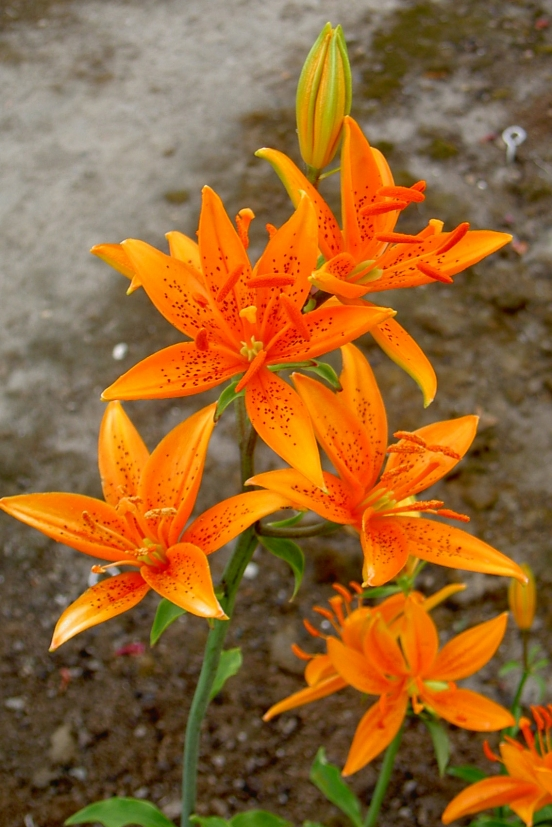

Scientific classification
- Kingdom: Plantae
- Clade: Tracheophytes
- Clade: Angiosperms
- Clade: Monocots
- Order: Liliales
- Family: Liliaceae
- Subfamily: Lilioideae
- Tribe: Lilieae
- Genus: Lilium
- Species: L. tsingtauense

Binomial name
- Lilium tsingtauense Gilg

Synonyms
- Synonymy: Lilium miquelianum Makino; Lilium miquelianum var. flavum Makino; Lilium carneum Nakai; Lilium tsingtauense var. carneum (Nakai) Nakai; Lilium tsingtauense f. carneum (Nakai) Y.N.Lee

= Lilium tsingtauense =

Species of lily

Lilium tsingtauense, also known as twilight lily, is an East Asian species of plants in the lily family. It is native to Korea and eastern China (Anhui + Shandong Provinces).

Lilium tsingtauense is an herb up to 85 cm tall, growing as a single stem from a scaly bulb. It has smooth, inversely lanceolate leaves, about 13 centimetres (5.1 in) long and mostly in 2 whorls. The plant bears loose umbels of 6 (but may be up to 15) upright, unscented, shallow trumpet-shaped flowers, that blossom under partial sunlight. These appear in midsummer and are orange or reddish-orange with maroon spots.

It is named for the city of Qingdao in The People's Republic of China, which was then known as Tsingtau under the German lease on the Kiautschou Bay Leased Territory.
