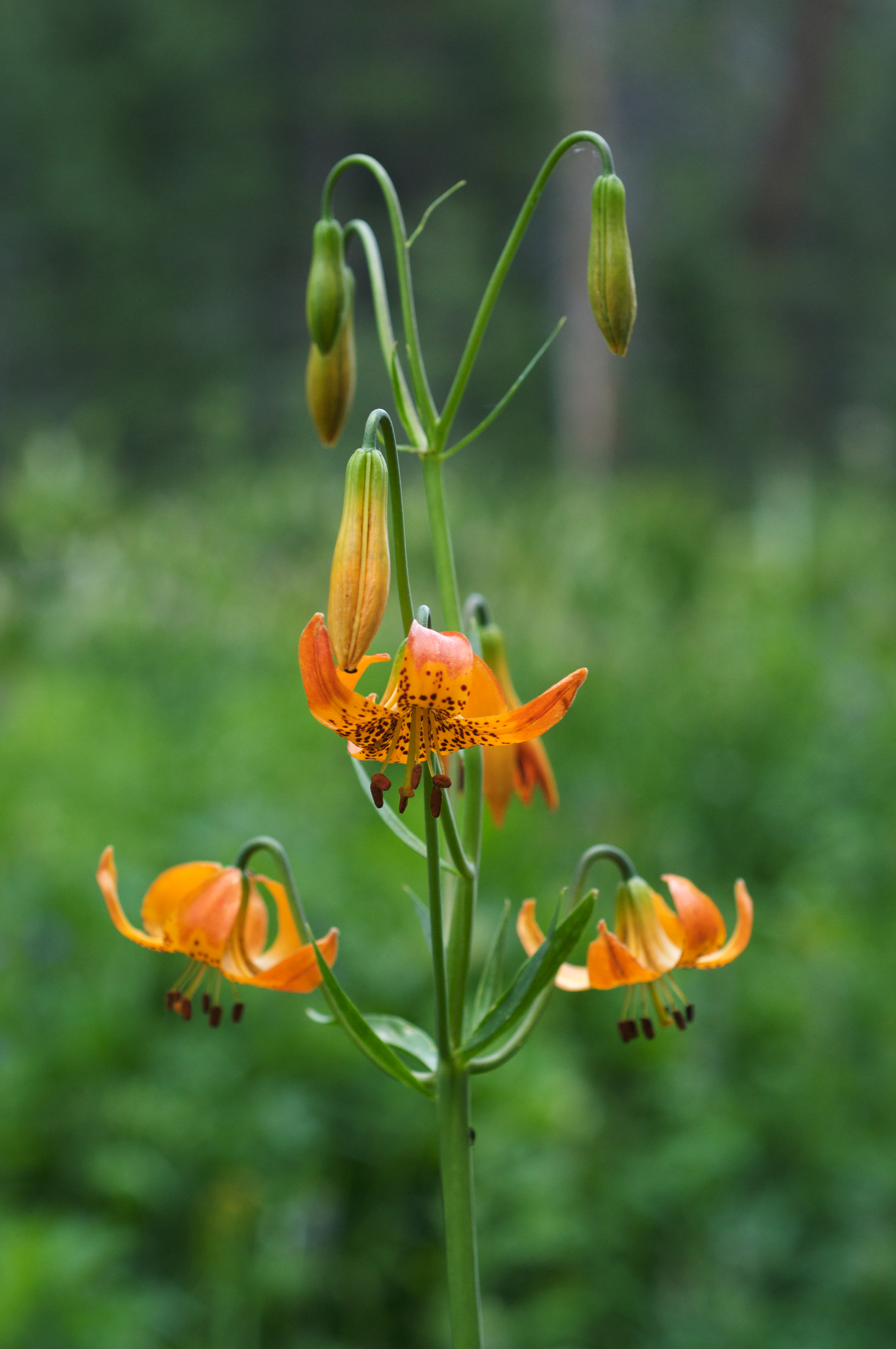

Scientific classification
- Kingdom: Plantae
- Clade: Embryophytes
- Clade: Tracheophytes
- Clade: Spermatophytes
- Clade: Angiosperms
- Clade: Monocots
- Order: Liliales
- Family: Liliaceae
- Subfamily: Lilioideae
- Genus: Lilium
- Species: L. kelleyanum

Binomial name
- Lilium kelleyanum Lemmon

Synonyms
- Synonymy: Lilium pardalinum var. parviflorum Eastw.; Lilium nevadense var. fresnense Eastw.; Lilium nevadense var. monense Eastw.; Lilium fresnense (Eastw.) Eastw.; Lilium inyoense Eastw.

= Lilium kelleyanum =

Species of lily

Lilium kelleyanum is a California species of lily known by the common name Kelley's lily. It grows primarily in wetlands in the Sierra Nevada as well as in the Coast Ranges and southern Cascades in the northern part of the state.

== Description ==
Lilium kelleyanum is a perennial herb known to exceed two meters in height. It originates from a scaly, elongated bulb up to about 8 centimetres (3.1 in) long. The oval leaves are located in several whorls about the stem, each up to 15 centimetres (5.9 in) long and drooping at the tip. The inflorescence bears up to 25 large, nodding lily flowers. The flower is bell-shaped with 6 strongly recurved yellow to orange tepals up to 6 centimetres (2.4 in) long. There are 6 stamens with large red anthers and a pistil which may be over 3 centimetres (1.2 in) long. The flowers are pollinated by swallowtails.
