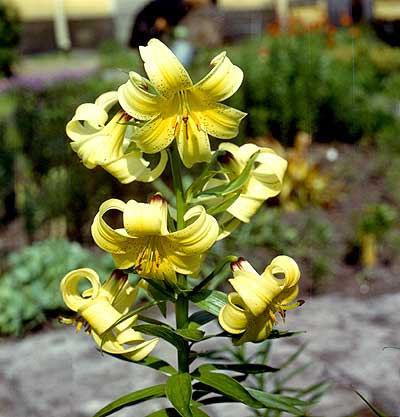
- Flowers of Lilium kesselringianum

Scientific classification
- Kingdom: Plantae
- Clade: Tracheophytes
- Clade: Angiosperms
- Clade: Monocots
- Order: Liliales
- Family: Liliaceae
- Subfamily: Lilioideae
- Tribe: Lilieae
- Genus: Lilium
- Species: L. kesselringianum

Binomial name
- Lilium kesselringianum Miscz.

= Lilium kesselringianum =

Species of lily

Lilium kesselringianum is a large herbaceous member of the lily family. It is native to North and South Caucasus as well as northern Turkey. It grows from sea level along the Black Sea up into the mountains to subalpine level on forest edges, in brushlands, and in grassy meadows.

The plant grows to a height of 40–60 inches (1–1.5m), but has been recorded growing up to 80inches (2m).

It has an oval bulb of 3–4 inches (10–20 cm) diameter and covered in scales.

The leaves are lanceolate and 4–8 inches (10–20 cm) long and grow up the length of the stem.

5–10 nodding flowers are displayed in June on a raceme at the tip of the stem. (In Abkhazia the plants flower up to 3 weeks later) Bright to straw yellow, tubular to bell–shaped they are spotted inside, 2.5–3 inches (6–8 cm) in diameter and 4–6 inches (10–15 cm) long. The petals are turned back at the tips. The pollen is bright yellow to beige.
