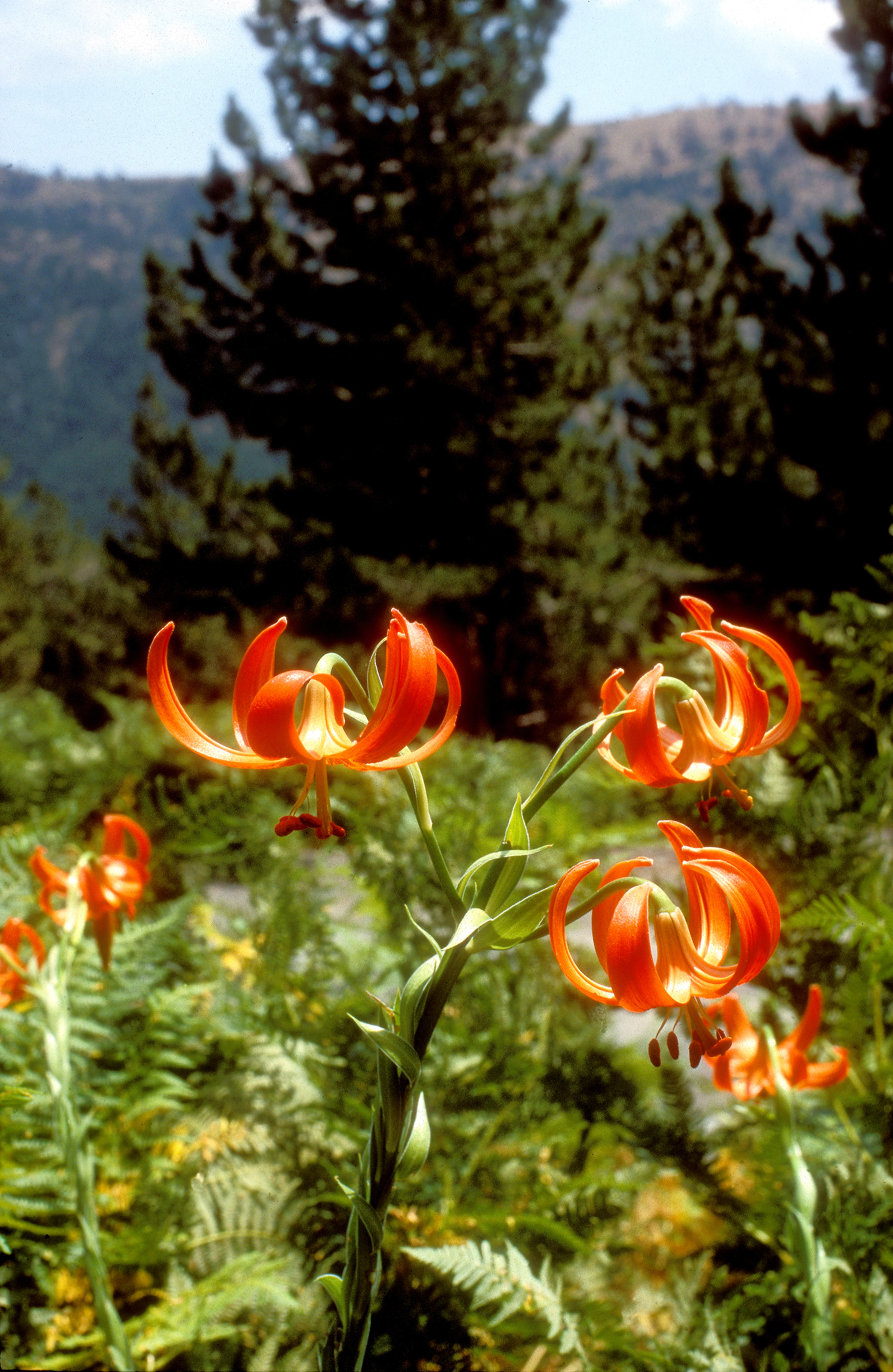
- Lilium chalcedonicum in habitat at Pindus National Park, Greece
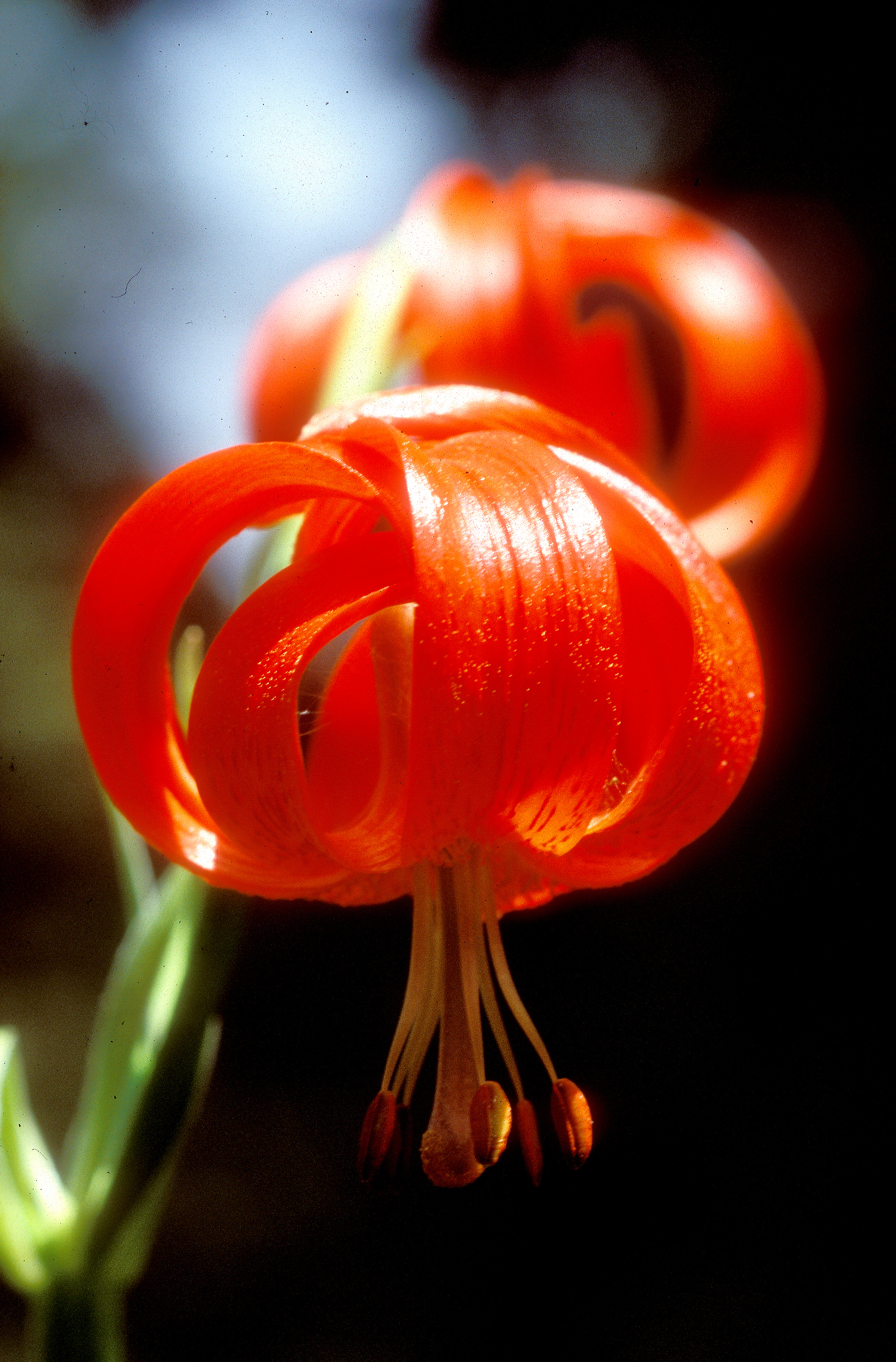
- Flower

Scientific classification
- Kingdom: Plantae
- Clade: Embryophytes
- Clade: Tracheophytes
- Clade: Angiosperms
- Clade: Monocots
- Order: Liliales
- Family: Liliaceae
- Subfamily: Lilioideae
- Genus: Lilium
- Species: L. chalcedonicum

Binomial name
- Lilium chalcedonicum L.

Synonyms
- Lilium calcedonicum misspelling; Lilium miniatum Salisb.; Lilium byzantinum Duch.; Lilium heldreichii Freyn

= Lilium chalcedonicum =

Scarlet Martagon Lily

Species of lily

Lilium chalcedonicum, the scarlet martagon lily, is a European species of Liriotypus lily, native to Tuscany, Greece and Albania. Some have been found in North Macedonia, Austria, Slovenia, and Sweden.

== Classification ==
The species was first described by Carl Linnaeus in 1753 on Mount Chalcedon in Thessaly, under its current name. Ιn addition to the genus of the same name, the varieties Lilium chalcedonicum var. maculatum, which bore denser flowers, and Lilium chalcedonicum var. heldreichii, which always produces only one flower, with base leaves wider and upper leaves very small, were named. However, these two varieties are no longer recognized.

This species hybridizes with Lilium candidum, creating Lilium x testaceum.

== Characteristics and appearance ==
It is a perennial, herbaceous plant, which can usually reach a height of 35-70 centimeters, but in some cases it can reach up to 1.5 meters. The bulb is yellowish-white and wide. The stem is green and covered entirely by lanceolate-serrate leaves, slightly twisted. The lower leaves are horizontal, 5–15 cm long and 4–8 cm wide. The upper ones are smaller, rather upright, and cover the stem.

The flowers are red, up to 10 cm long, borne all together at the top of the stem. They can be from 1 to 6 in number, but as many as 12 when cultivated in good, humus-rich soil in somewhat damp, shady places. They face downwards and the petals turn backwards. They bear a heavy scent, with orange pollen and stamens that protrude from the perianth. The flowers appear rather late, usually July.

== Distribution and habitat ==
It is native to the Balkans but it can also be found in Tuscany. In the Balkans, it spreads from southern Albania across much of mainland Greece, as well as on the islands of the Ionian Sea and Aegean Sea. It thrives in cool areas, mainly in glades of deciduous and boxwood forests of mountainous regions as well as meadows on calcareous, rocky soils at an altitude of 600–1700 meters.

This species highly resents being moved, probably the main reason it is rarely seen in commerce.

== Culture and symbolism ==
Its earliest known depiction is in a Minoan fresco dating back 3,500 years to the Bronze Age, discovered on the Aegean coast on the island of Santorini, which was buried by a volcano with the Minoan eruption.

Because of its striking appearance it has been cultivated since at least the 16th century. It was supposedly introduced to Europe by Master Harbran from Istanbul in 1597. Due to its resemblance to a turban, it is sometimes referred to as the Turk, however it should not be confused with the similar North American lily Lilium superbum.

In the Victorian language of flowers, lilies portray love, ardor, and affection for your loved ones, while orange lilies stand for happiness, love, and warmth.

== Bibliography ==
- Σφήκας Γιώργος, Αγριολούλουδα της Ελλάδας, EFSTATHIADIS GROUP A.E., Αθήνα, 1999. ISBN 960-226-062-9
- Arne Strid: The lilies of Greece. In: Caroline Boisset (Hrsg.): Lilies And Related Plants, 2007, S. 18–26, ISBN 978-1-902896-84-7
- Carl Feldmaier, Judith McRae: Lilien. Ulmer, Stuttgart 1982, ISBN 3-8001-6121-4
- Media related to Lilium chalcedonicum at Wikimedia Commons
