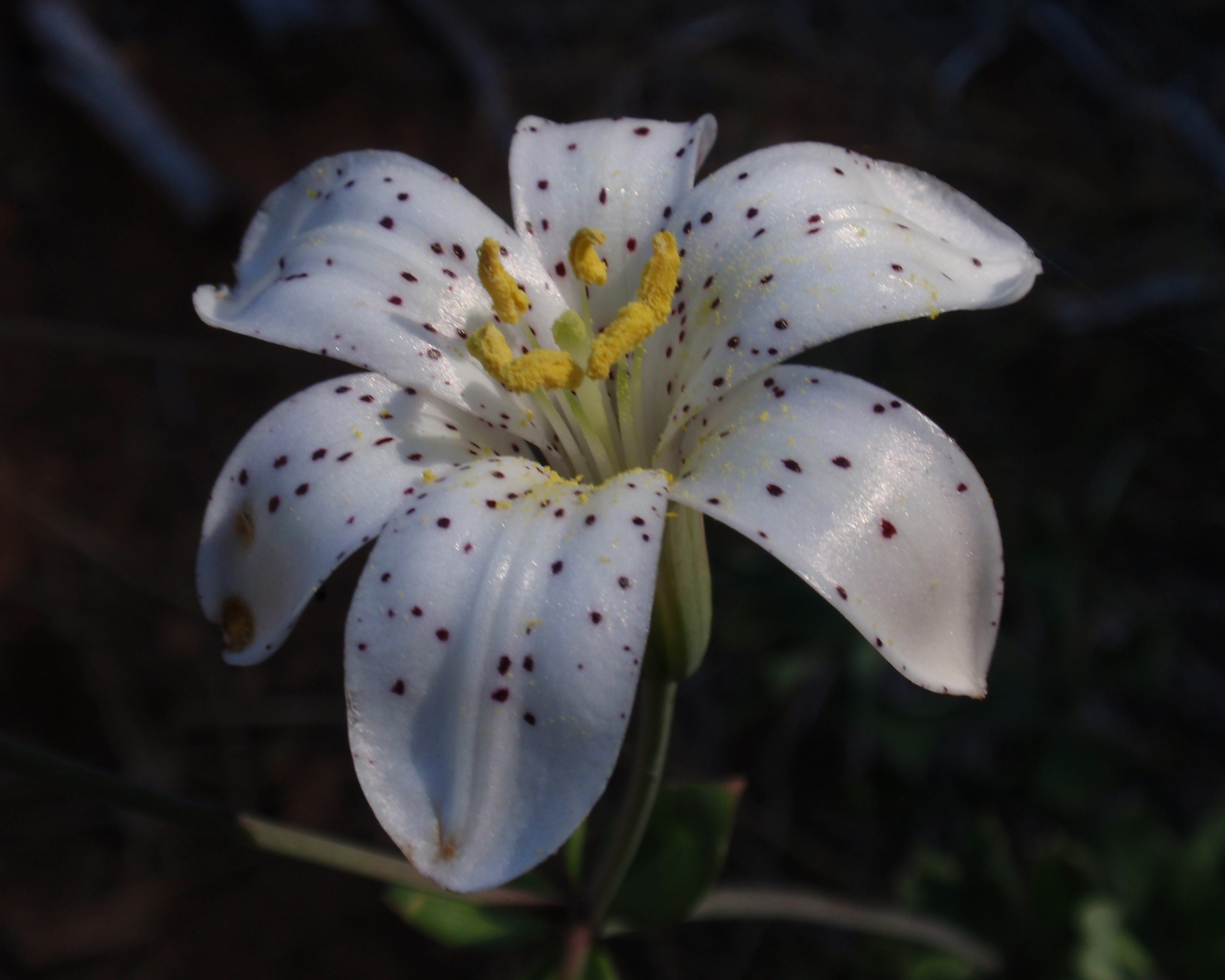

Scientific classification
- Kingdom: Plantae
- Clade: Tracheophytes
- Clade: Angiosperms
- Clade: Monocots
- Order: Liliales
- Family: Liliaceae
- Subfamily: Lilioideae
- Tribe: Lilieae
- Genus: Lilium
- Species: L. rubescens

Binomial name
- Lilium rubescens S.Watson

Synonyms
- Lilium washingtonianum var. rubescens (S.Watson) Tilton, illegitimate superfluous name; Lilium purpureum W.Bull; Lilium washingtonianum var. purpureum (W.Bull) Baker

= Lilium rubescens =

Species of lily

Lilium rubescens is an uncommon species of lily known by the common names redwood lily and chaparral lily. It is native to northwestern California and southwestern Oregon, where it is known from the Coast Ranges from Lane County to Santa Cruz Counties.

As its names suggest, it is a member of the flora in redwood forest understory and chaparral habitat types. This is a perennial herb growing a waxy, erect stem up to two meters in height. It forms a scaly, oval-shaped bulb up to about 9 centimeters long. The oval leaves are located in several whorls about the stem, each up to 13 centimeters in length with wavy edges. The inflorescence bears up to 40 erect flowers. The fragrant flower is trumpet-shaped with 6 tepals up to 7 centimeters long and somewhat recurved or curled back. The tepals are white to pale purple or pinkish on the inside, darker on the outside, and freckled with reddish spotting. There are 6 stamens with yellowish anthers and a pistil which may be 4 centimeters in length. The flowers are probably pollinated by bees and the pale swallowtail (Papilio eurymedon).

This plant is threatened by a number of factors, including development, logging, non-native species, road maintenance, and horticultural collecting of the bulbs and flowers.
