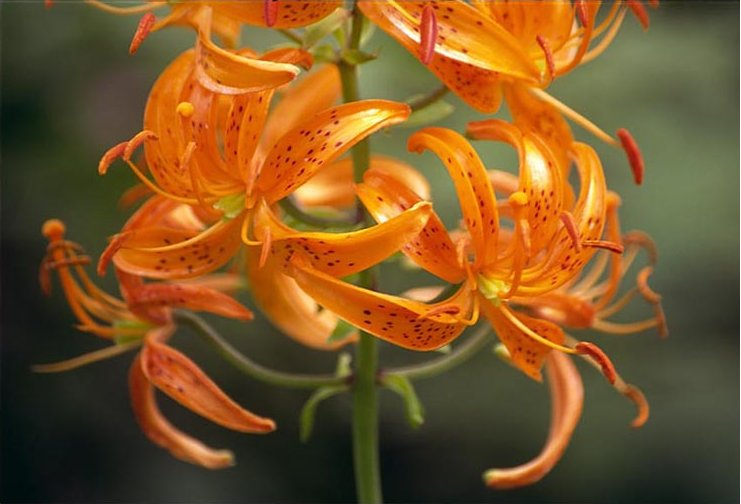
- Flowers of Lilium distichum

Scientific classification
- Kingdom: Plantae
- Clade: Tracheophytes
- Clade: Angiosperms
- Clade: Monocots
- Order: Liliales
- Family: Liliaceae
- Subfamily: Lilioideae
- Tribe: Lilieae
- Genus: Lilium
- Species: L. distichum

Binomial name
- Lilium distichum Nakai, 1917

= Lilium distichum =

Species of lily

Lilium distichum is an Asian species herbaceous plant of the lily family which is native to northeastern China (Heilongjiang, Jilin, Liaoning), Korea, and eastern Russia (Primorye, Amur Krai, Khabarovsk).

Lilium distichum flourishes among shrubs and in forests. It grows from 2–4 ft (61–122 cm) tall. The stem is cylindrical and slender with a single whorl of leaves mid–way up the stem. It also has much smaller oval leaves sparsely, alternately on the upper stem.

The flowers are yellow–orange or orange–vermillion with the petals spotted in purple, somewhat ‘flatfaced’ in appearance with irregular distribution of petals around the face of the flower forming a fanshape. The tips of the petals are reflexed. 2–10 flowers are carried on an inflorescence in July and August.

The name distichum refers to the two types of leaves the plant carries.
