= Lilium cernuum =

Scientific classification
- Kingdom: Plantae
- Clade: Tracheophytes
- Clade: Angiosperms
- Clade: Monocots
- Order: Liliales
- Family: Liliaceae
- Subfamily: Lilioideae
- Tribe: Lilieae
- Genus: Lilium
- Species: L. cernuum

Binomial name
- Lilium cernuum Kom.

Synonyms
- Lilium palibinianum Y.Yabe; Lilium graminifolium H.Lév. & Vaniot; Lilium cernuum var. atropurpureum Nakai; Lilium cernuum var. candidum Nakai

Species of lily

Lilium cernuum is a species of lily native to Korea, the Primorye region of Russia, and northeastern China (Provinces of Jilin + Liaoning).

Lilium cernuum typically grows to 50 cm tall. The flowers are white to purple, though usually pink with maroon spots, and are scented. The species is similar in many respects to Lilium pumilum. The name cernuum refers to its nodding (hanging) flowers.
