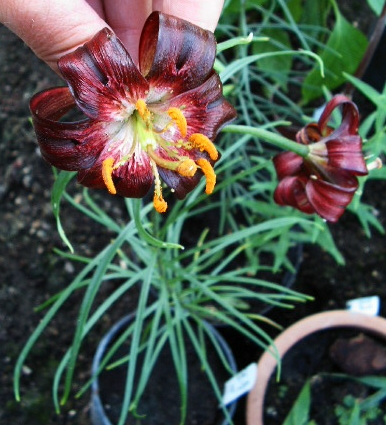

Scientific classification
- Kingdom: Plantae
- Clade: Tracheophytes
- Clade: Angiosperms
- Clade: Monocots
- Order: Liliales
- Family: Liliaceae
- Subfamily: Lilioideae
- Tribe: Lilieae
- Genus: Lilium
- Species: L. papilliferum

Binomial name
- Lilium papilliferum Franch.

= Lilium papilliferum =

Species of flowering plant

Lilium papilliferum is a species of the lily genus (Lilium) in the Oriental hybrids division (VII). The species, about which little is known, has only been collected a few times and is native to north-central and south-central China. Its deep dark red flower color is unique in the genus.

== Description ==
=== Vegetative habit ===
Lilium papilliferum is a perennial herbaceous plant that reaches 30 to 60 cm in height. The bulb, which serves as a survival organ, is spherical and ranges in color from whitish-pale pink to dark purple. It can grow up to 38 mm in height and 34 mm in diameter. The scales surrounding the bulb are thick and ovate-lanceolate, measuring up to 28 mm in height and 18 mm in width, arranged in 10 to 12 roof-tile-like patterns.

The stem of the plant is slender, delicate, and papillose. It has a thickness of up to 4 mm at the base and initially grows underground, creeping up to 5 cm before emerging through the soil. The stem has a green base and is entirely covered in reddish-brown coloration.

=== Leaves ===
The stem bears numerous scattered leaves, primarily located in the middle and upper sections. These leaves are linear in shape, five-veined, and gradually taper towards the tip. They measure between 5.5 and 10 cm in length and between 2 and 4 mm in width. The leaves have a glossy, hairless, and green appearance. They are slightly narrow at the base and exhibit a greenish-white coloration. The leaf edges and veins are roughened. Additionally, the plant features bracts arranged in whorls of 3 to 5 leaves, resembling the stem leaves but measuring only 4 to 5 cm in length and 3 to 5 mm in width.

=== Flowers, fruits, and seeds ===
Lilium papilliferum blooms during the months of July and August. The flowers are nodding and can reach a length of up to 4 cm. They appear either as solitary flowers, two in an umbel, or up to five in a raceme. The blossoms possess a cocoa or sweetly resinous scent. The pedicels, which support the flowers, are hairless, slightly arched, and greenish-purple in color, measuring 4.5 to 7 cm in length.

The six tepals (bracts) of the flower are uniformly shaped and ovate-lanceolate. They are highly recurved, resembling a Turk's cap shape, and measure 3.5 to 4.2 cm in length, with a width of 10 mm to 14 mm. The tepals have a smooth surface and are adorned with numerous irregular papillae, clustered towards the thickened apex. The tepals exhibit a shiny scarlet, wine, or brownish-red coloration with a few green spots, while the backside appears reddish-light green.

The stamens of the flower can grow up to 27 mm in length. The filaments are slender, pale green, hairless, and tapering, measuring up to 22 mm in length. The pollen is light orange, and the anthers, which are kidney-shaped, are light brown in color. The pale green ovary is cylindrical, furrowed, and measures 20 mm in length and 5 mm in width. The pistil is brownish-purple and bears a cream-colored stigma, which is papillose.

Nectaries of Lilium papilliferum are situated at the base of the petals. The longitudinal nectary groove is partially covered with dense white papillae, while the remaining part is dark red or brown at the base.

By September, the seeds of the plant reach maturity within elongated seed capsules measuring 2 to 2.5 cm in length and 1.5 to 2 cm in width. The seeds germinate immediately in an epigamic manner, meaning no external forces are necessary to overcome germination inhibition.

== Botanical history and systematics ==
Lilium papilliferum was discovered in August 1888 by missionary and plant collector Pierre Jean Marie Delavay in Tapintse on the northern tip of Lake Dali in northwestern Yunnan. It was first described in 1892 by Adrien René Franchet based on herbarium material. Subsequent discoveries were made by George Forrest in 1914 at the Mekong-Saluen watershed, and Joseph Francis Charles Rock in 1922. In 1948, Rock brought the bulbs to England for the first time, leading to the first cultivated flower of Lilium papilliferum in 1949.

Like many other Chinese species, Lilium papilliferum was initially classified by Harold Frederick Comber in the Sinomartagon section. However, molecular genetic studies have revealed that this section is polyphyletic and can be divided into at least five distinct groups, some of which are clearly separated.

== Distribution ==
Lilium papilliferum is a rare plant native to the provinces of Shaanxi, Sichuan, and northeastern Yunnan in the People's Republic of China. However, in the early 21st century, growers and collectors obtained an unidentified species that turned out to be Lilium papilliferum, collected from neighboring Tibet to the west. This discovery suggests that the species is also native to Tibet.

The plant thrives in sunny alpine regions, often found among shrubs on slopes, dry rock outcrops, and open, stony pastures in the alpine zone. It can be found at altitudes ranging from 1000 to 3300 meters. The region experiences monsoon rains during the summer, while hard frosts are relatively uncommon.

== Citations ==
Most of the information in this article comes from the sources listed, but the following sources are also cited:

- Mark Wood: Lily Species – Notes and Images. CD-ROM, Fassung vom 13. Juli 2006
- Flora Of China. Vol. 24, S. 146
- Stephen G. Haw (1986), The Lilies of China. 1986, pp. 123–125, ISBN 978-0-88192-034-5
- F. A. Waugh: A Conspectus of the Genus Lilium [Concluded] In: Botanical Gazette 27 Nr. 5, 1899, p. 340
- Alisdair Aird, Three Uncommon Lily Species From China. In: The Lily Yearbook of the North American Lily Society. 58, 2005, pp. 92–93, ISSN 0741-9910
- Carl Feldmaier; Judith McRae (1982), Die neuen Lilien., Ulmer, Stuttgart 1982, pp. 125–126, ISBN 978-3-8001-6121-8
