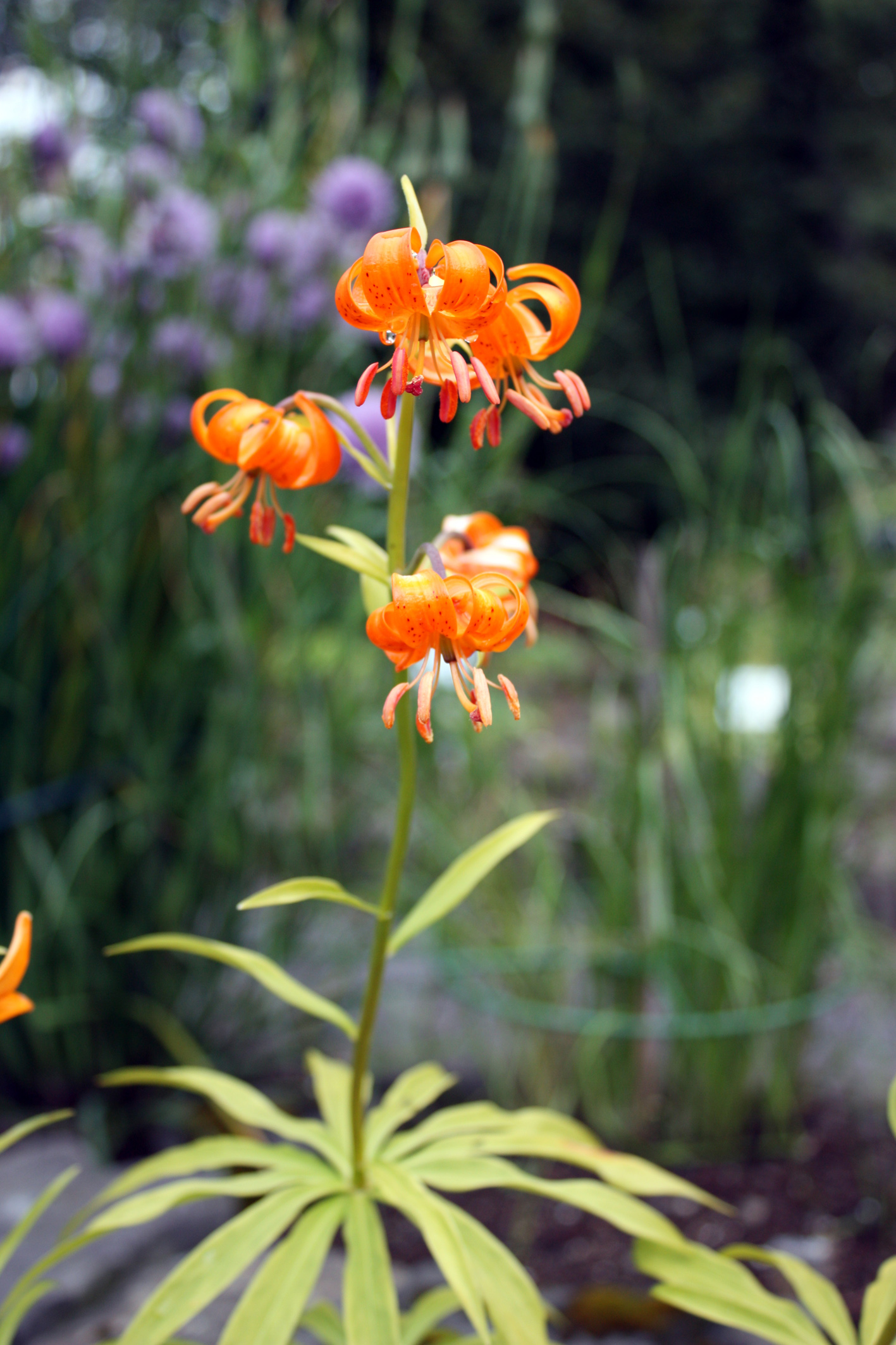

Scientific classification
- Kingdom: Plantae
- Clade: Tracheophytes
- Clade: Angiosperms
- Clade: Monocots
- Order: Liliales
- Family: Liliaceae
- Subfamily: Lilioideae
- Tribe: Lilieae
- Genus: Lilium
- Species: L. medeoloides

Binomial name
- Lilium medeoloides A.Gray

Synonyms
- Lilium avenaceum Fisch. ex Maxim.; Lilium sado-insulare Masam. & Satomi; Lilium medeoloides f. atropurpureum Okuyama

= Lilium medeoloides =

Species of lily

Lilium medeoloides is an East Asian herb in the lily family. It is native to southeast China, Jeju-do in Korea, Japan and eastern Russia (Kamchatka, Kuril Islands, Sakhalin), where it grows in forests and on grassy and rocky subalpine areas.

It is stem rooting and sports lanceolate stalkless leaves about 12 cm long which are arranged in one or two whorls on the lower part of the stem with odd leaves on the upper part of the stem. The stem is hollow. The plant produces short racemes on which are up to 10 scentless, apricot to orange-red, Turk's-cap style flowers of 4.5 cm with dark spots and purple anthers. The whole plant grows to 40–80 cm.

The name Kurumayuri can be translated as "Lily with wheels".

formerly included

- Lilium medeoloides var. obovatum Franch. & Sav., now called Lilium hansonii Leichtlin ex D.D.T.Moore

== Gallery ==
Leaves	Flower	Fruit	In Mount Haku
