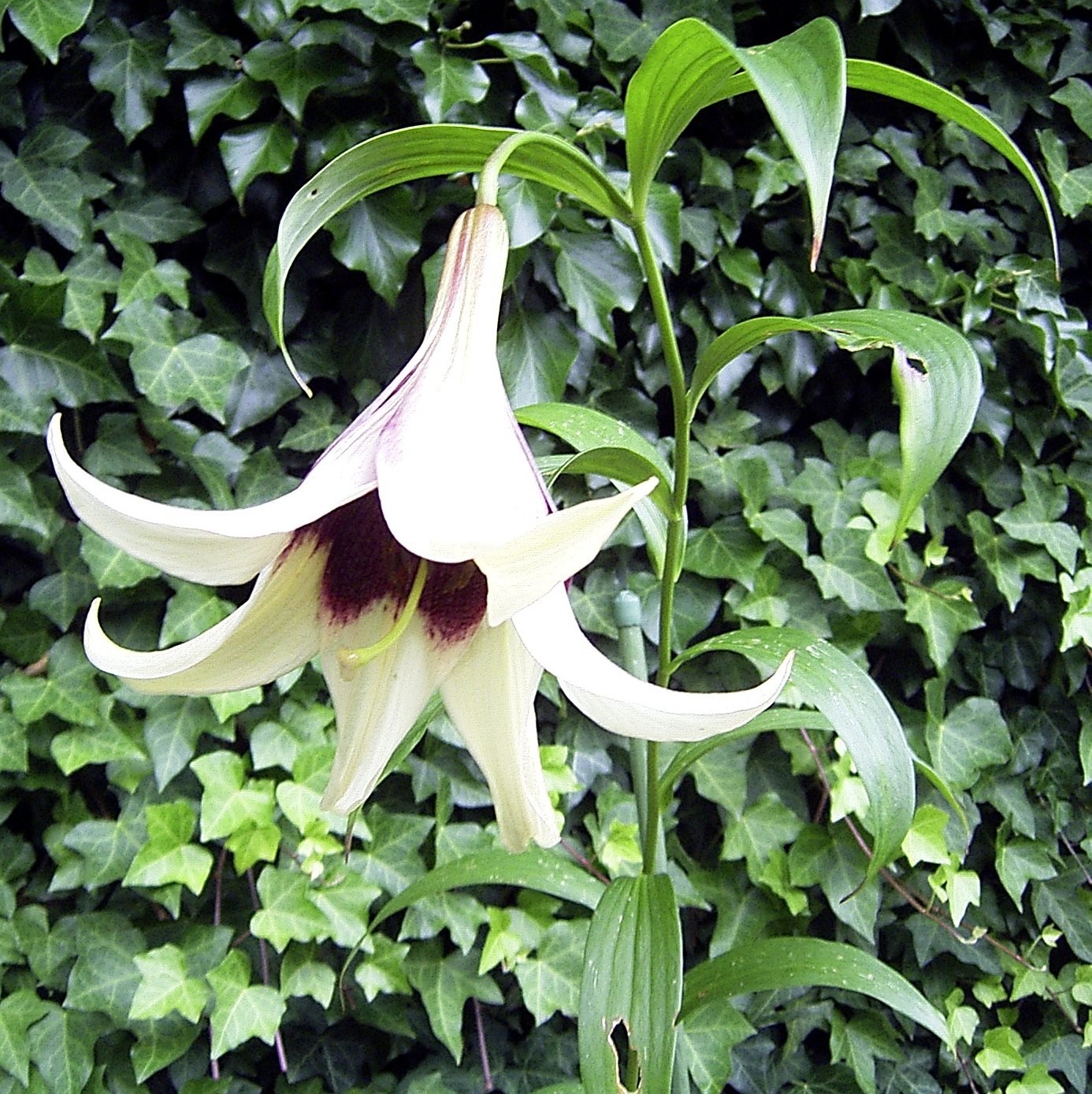

Scientific classification
- Kingdom: Plantae
- Clade: Tracheophytes
- Clade: Angiosperms
- Clade: Monocots
- Order: Liliales
- Family: Liliaceae
- Subfamily: Lilioideae
- Tribe: Lilieae
- Genus: Lilium
- Species: L. nepalense

Binomial name
- Lilium nepalense D.Don 1820 not Collett & Hemsl. 1890

Synonyms
- Lilium ochroleucum Wall. ex Baker

= Lilium nepalense =

Lily of Nepal

Species of lily

Lilium nepalense, the lily of Nepal, is an Asian plant species in the lily family. It is native to the Himalayas and nearby regions: northern Thailand, northern Myanmar, Assam, Bhutan, Sikkim, Nepal, Uttarakhand, Tibet, and Yunnan. It can be found growing on wet forest borders at 1,200 to 3,000 m (3,900 to 9,800 ft).

Lilium nepalense grows up to about 1 m high, usually less. The bulbs are stoloniferous, and for newly planted bulbs, the shoot will often come up some distance from the planting spot. Flowers are few, often solitary, pendant, pale green with a purple throat. The flowers are generally unscented during daylight hours and heavily scented after dark.

== Cultivation ==
In cultivation, L. nepalense is best suited to a cool glasshouse, preferring a slightly acidic, humus rich soil that is well drained. It prefers the bulb to be kept cool while the plant itself can stand full sun. The plant should be well watered in spring, simulating a snow melt. After flowering, the plant should be kept fairly dry or the bulb will rot.

formerly included

- Lilium nepalense var. burmanicum, now called Lilium primulinum var. burmanicum
- Lilium nepalense var. ochraceum, now called Lilium primulinum var. ochraceum
