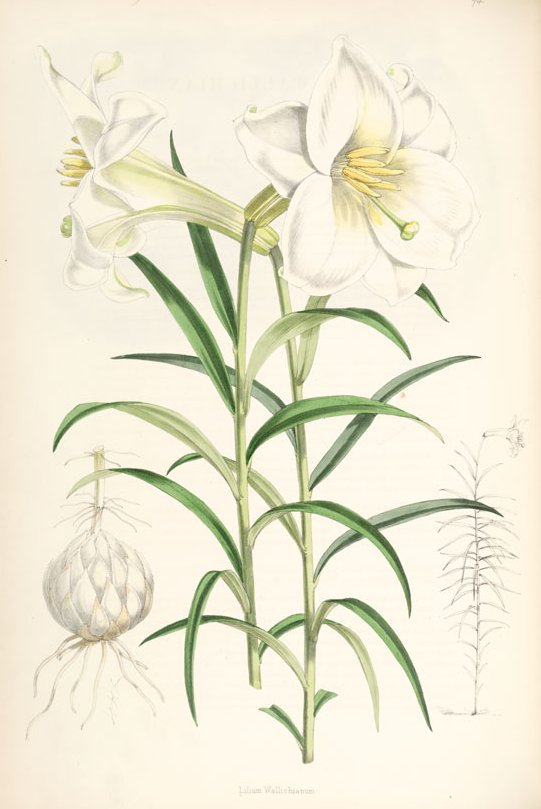
- 1880 illustration

Scientific classification
- Kingdom: Plantae
- Clade: Embryophytes
- Clade: Tracheophytes
- Clade: Spermatophytes
- Clade: Angiosperms
- Clade: Monocots
- Order: Liliales
- Family: Liliaceae
- Subfamily: Lilioideae
- Genus: Lilium
- Species: L. wallichianum

Binomial name
- Lilium wallichianum Schult.f.

Synonyms
- Lilium longiflorum Wall., illegitimate homonym not Thunb. (1794); Lilium longiflorum subsp. wallichianum (Schult. & Schult.f.) Baker; Lilium batisua Buch.-Ham. ex D.Don; Lilium neilgherrense Wight, syn. of var. neilgherrense; Lilium longiflorum subsp. neilgherrense (Wight) Baker, syn. of var. neilgherrense; Lilium tubiflorum Wight, syn. of var. neilgherrense; Lilium metzii Steud. ex Duch., syn of var. neilgherrense

= Lilium wallichianum =

Species of lily

Lilium wallichianum is an Asian species of bulbous plants in the lily family native to the Indian subcontinent and to Myanmar. It is native to India, as well as Nepal, Bhutan, and Myanmar.

Lilium wallichianum grows on slopes and grasslands at 1,200 to 2,000 m (3,900 to 6,600 ft), and in moist shade 1,100 to 2,000 m (3,600 to 6,600 ft) elevation. The bulbs are stoloniferous, with new bulbs capable of appearing some distance from the parent plant. The green stem tinged with purple grows up to 2 m (6.6 ft) high. The leaves are scattered, dark green, linear to lanceolate and up to 25 cm (9.8 in) long. Each stem bears up to four trumpet-shaped flowers, white to creamy-yellow, held horizontally and up to 20 cm (7.9 in) across. A fairly difficult species to grow successfully in the garden, it requires a moist slightly acidic soil with excellent drainage. The species prefers light dappled shade and blooms very late in the season.

The species was named for Dr. Nathaniel Wallich (1786–1854), Danish plant hunter, botanist and physician.

Varieties

- Lilium wallichianum var. neilgherrense (Wight) H.Hara - Nepal, Karnataka, Tamil Nadu and Kerala in southern India
- Lilium wallichianum var. wallichianum - Himalayas
