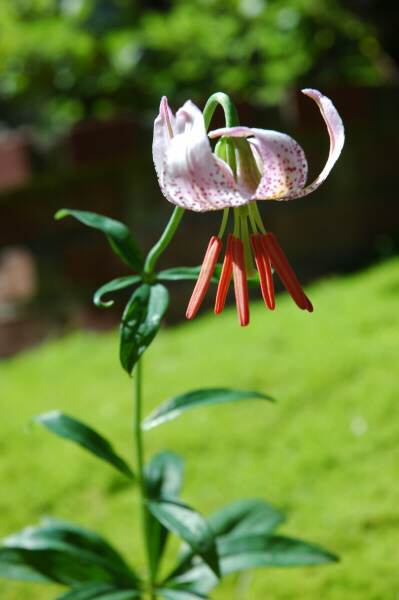

Scientific classification
- Kingdom: Plantae
- Clade: Tracheophytes
- Clade: Angiosperms
- Clade: Monocots
- Order: Liliales
- Family: Liliaceae
- Subfamily: Lilioideae
- Tribe: Lilieae
- Genus: Lilium
- Species: L. kelloggii

Binomial name
- Lilium kelloggii Purdy

= Lilium kelloggii =

Species of lily

Lilium kelloggii is a species of lily known by the common name Kellogg's lily. It is endemic to the Klamath Mountains of northwestern California and southwestern Oregon, where it grows in forests, including those dominated by redwoods.

Lilium kelloggii is a perennial herb known to exceed two meters in height. It produces from a scaly, elongated bulb up to about 7.5 centimeters long. The stem is ringed with dense whorls of up to 40 leaves, each leaf up to 16 centimeters in length. The inflorescence bears up to 27 large, showy, nodding flowers. The fragrant flower is bell-shaped with 6 strongly recurved pink tepals up to 8 centimeters in length. There are 6 stamens with large red anthers up to 1.4 centimeters long and a pistil which may be over 4 centimeters in length. The flowers are pollinated by swallowtails.
