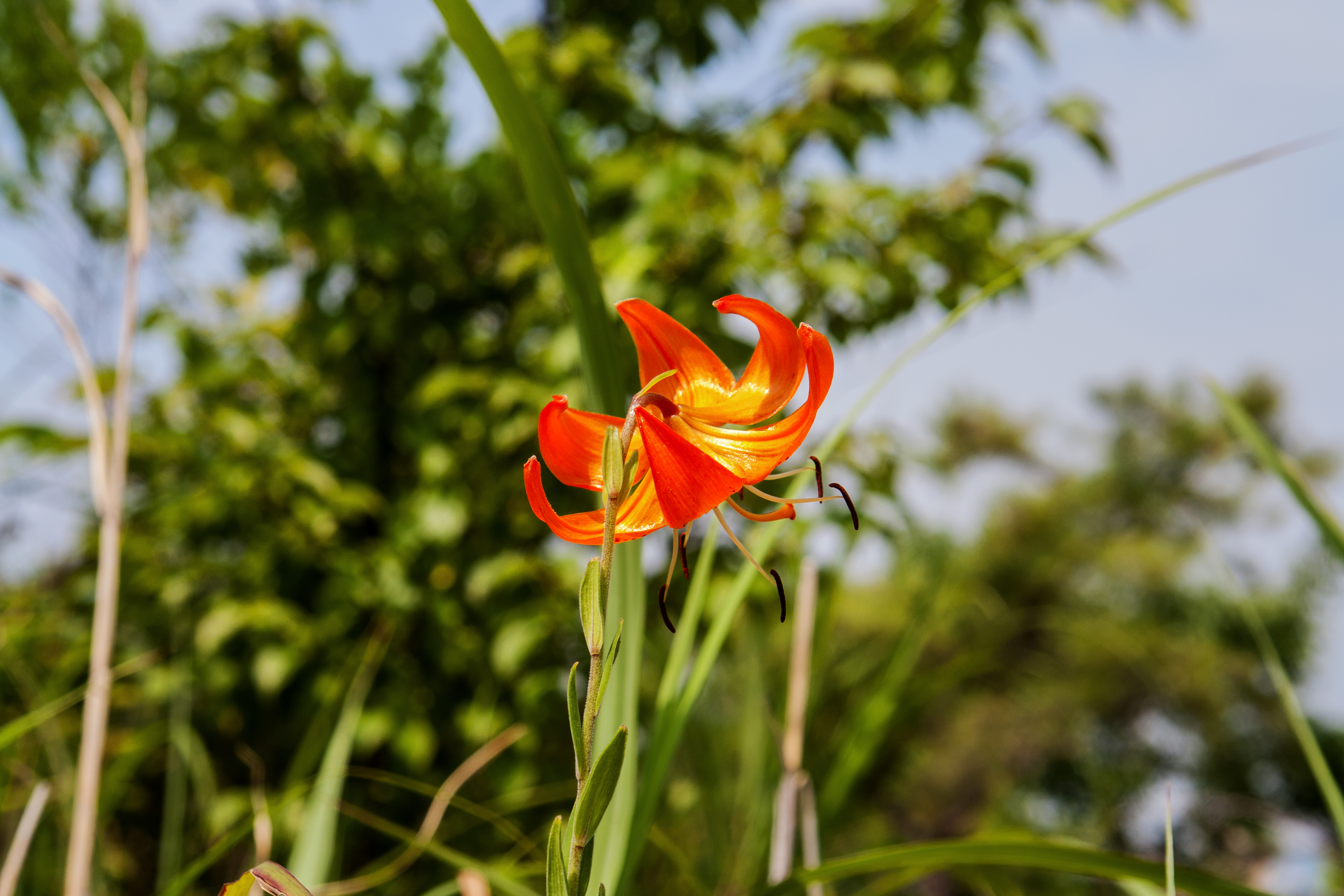

Scientific classification
- Kingdom: Plantae
- Clade: Tracheophytes
- Clade: Angiosperms
- Clade: Monocots
- Order: Liliales
- Family: Liliaceae
- Subfamily: Lilioideae
- Genus: Lilium
- Species: L. amabile

Binomial name
- Lilium amabile Palib.

Synonyms
- Lilium amabile var. flavum Y.N.Lee; Lilium amabile var. immaculatum T.B.Lee; Lilium amabile var. kwangnungensis Y.S.Kim & W.B.Lee; Lilium fauriei H.Lév. & Vaniot

= Lilium amabile =

Species of lily

Lilium amabile, also known as the friendly lily or lovable lily, is a flowering bulbous perennial plant in the lily family Liliaceae. The Latin specific epithet amabile means 'lovable'.

== Description ==
Lilium amabile grows from 40 centimetres (16 in) to 80 centimetres (31 in) tall. The bulb measures 2.5 centimetres (1 in) to 3 centimetres (1.2 in) in diameter. The flowers are either solitary or in a raceme of 3 flowers. The sepals and petals are red, sometimes dark red-orange or yellow. The plant has been described as having an unpleasant, rotting smell.

== Distribution and habitat ==
Lilium amabile is native to China's Liaoning Province and Korea.
