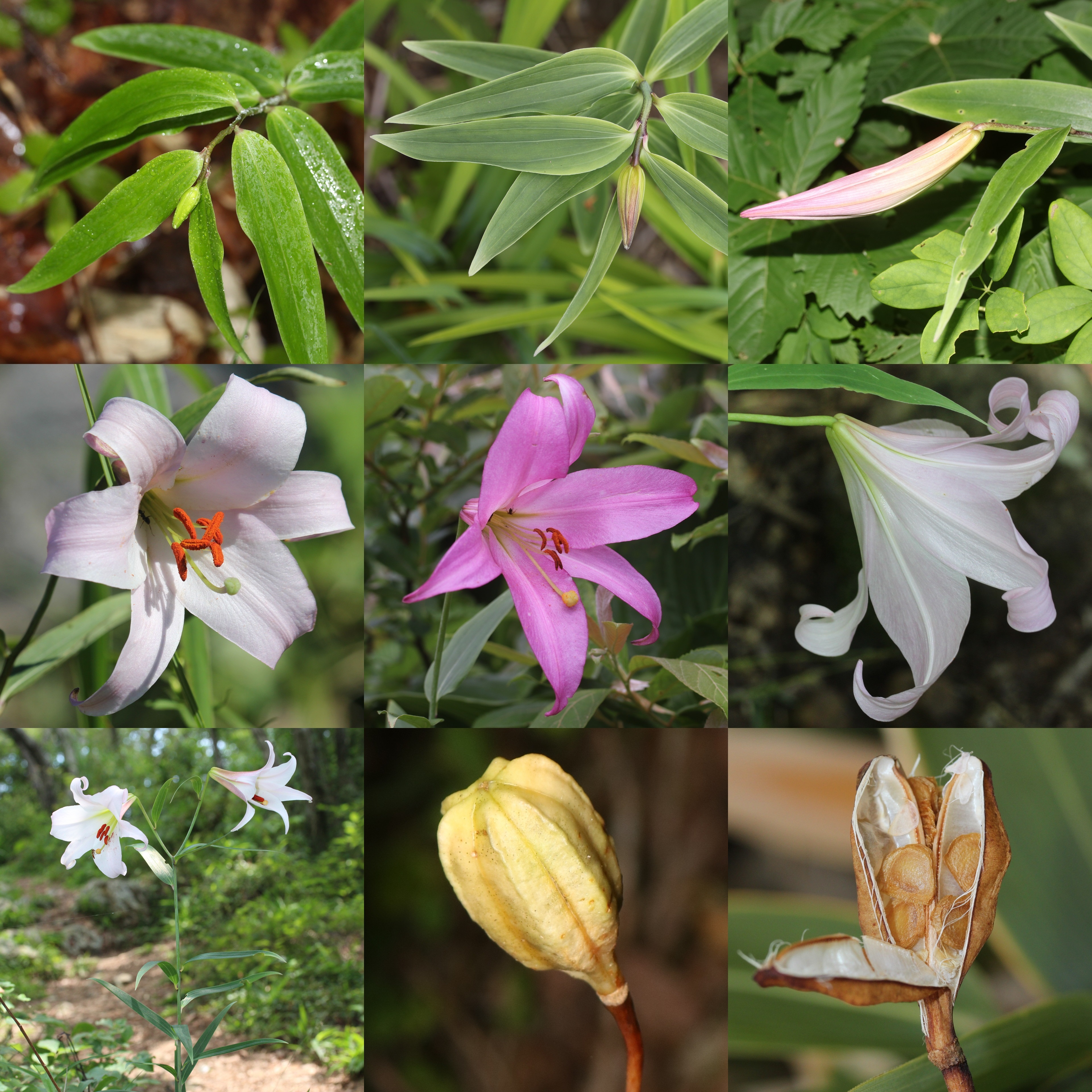

Scientific classification
- Kingdom: Plantae
- Clade: Tracheophytes
- Clade: Angiosperms
- Clade: Monocots
- Order: Liliales
- Family: Liliaceae
- Subfamily: Lilioideae
- Genus: Lilium
- Species: L. japonicum

Binomial name
- Lilium japonicum Thunb. ex Houtt.

Synonyms
- List: Lilium abeanum Honda; Lilium belladonna Baker; Lilium brownii Poit.; Lilium elisabethiae Leichtlin; Lilium japonicum var. albomarginatum Makino; Lilium japonicum var. album M.Furuya; Lilium japonicum f. angustifolium Makino; Lilium japonicum var. hyuuganum M.Furuya; Lilium japonicum var. ishimanum M.Furuya & Gamo; Lilium japonicum f. purpureum T.Terash.; Lilium japonicum f. roseum Voss; Lilium japonicum var. rubrum M.Furuya; Lilium krameri Hook.f.; Lilium krameri var. barrianum Baker; Lilium kramerianum Mast. & T.Moore; Lilium makinoi Koidz.

= Lilium japonicum =

Species of plant

Lilium japonicum, the bamboo lily, is a species of flowering plant in the family Liliaceae. It is native to central and southern Japan. A cold-hardy bulbous geophyte growing to 50 to 100 cm (20 to 40 in) tall, it is often found in association with bamboos of the genus Sasa, which it resembles in its stems and leaves. It is used in Shinto rites.

== Subtaxa ==
The following varieties are accepted:

- Lilium japonicum var. abeanum (Honda) Kitam. – Tokushima Prefecture on Shikoku, extremely rare, adapted to serpentine soils
- Lilium japonicum var. angustifolium (Makino) Makino – Kii Peninsula of Honshu, may be a natural hybrid with Lilium auratum
- Lilium japonicum var. japonicum – entire range
