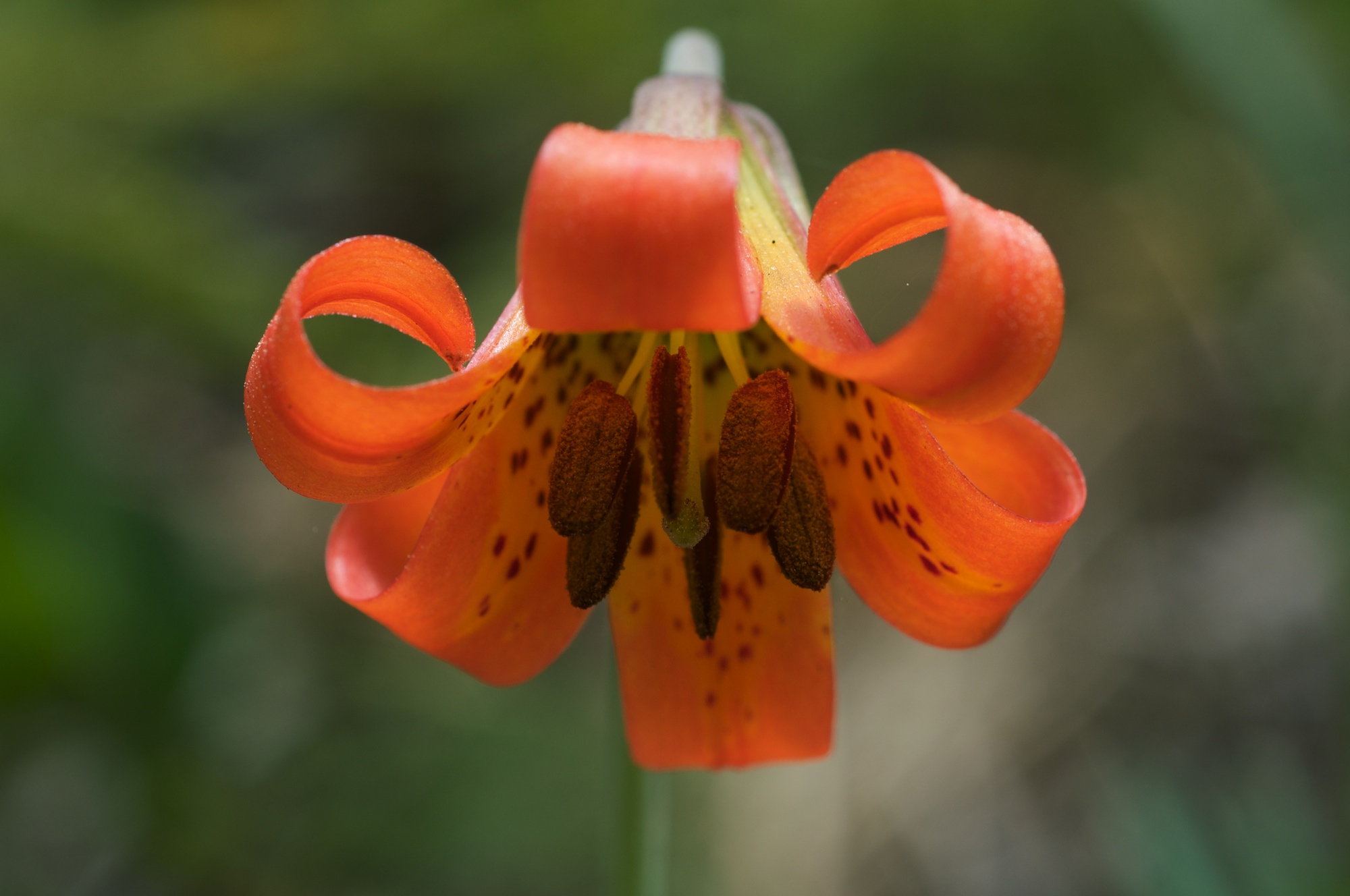

Conservation status
- Imperiled (NatureServe)

Scientific classification
- Kingdom: Plantae
- Clade: Tracheophytes
- Clade: Angiosperms
- Clade: Monocots
- Order: Liliales
- Family: Liliaceae
- Subfamily: Lilioideae
- Tribe: Lilieae
- Genus: Lilium
- Species: L. maritimum

Binomial name
- Lilium maritimum Kellogg

= Lilium maritimum =

Species of lily

Lilium maritimum is a species of lily known by the common name coast lily. It is endemic to California, where it is known only from the coastline north of San Francisco. It formerly occurred south of San Francisco, but these occurrences have all been extirpated. The species is now restricted to the North Coast from Marin County to Del Norte County, and is most common in Mendocino County. It grows in the California coastal prairie habitat, coniferous forests, and bogs amongst Drosera species.

== Description ==
Lilium maritimum is a perennial herb usually exceeding a meter in height and known to exceed two meters at times. Specimens from coastal bluffs and similar harsh habitats are much smaller. The plant grows from a scaly, elongated bulb several centimeters long. The oval leaves are mostly basal, with some located in several whorls about the stem. They may reach 18 centimeters long.

The inflorescence bears up to 13 large, nodding flowers. The flower is bell-shaped with 6 tepals with tips recurved or curled tightly back. The tepals are up to 5 centimeters long and red to orange, usually with spots. There are 6 stamens with large red anthers sometimes over a centimeter long, and a pistil which may be over 3 centimeters in length.

=== Pollinators ===
Lilium maritimum flowers are pollinated by Allen's and Anna's hummingbirds when first open, and later by bumblebees (Bombus spp.).
