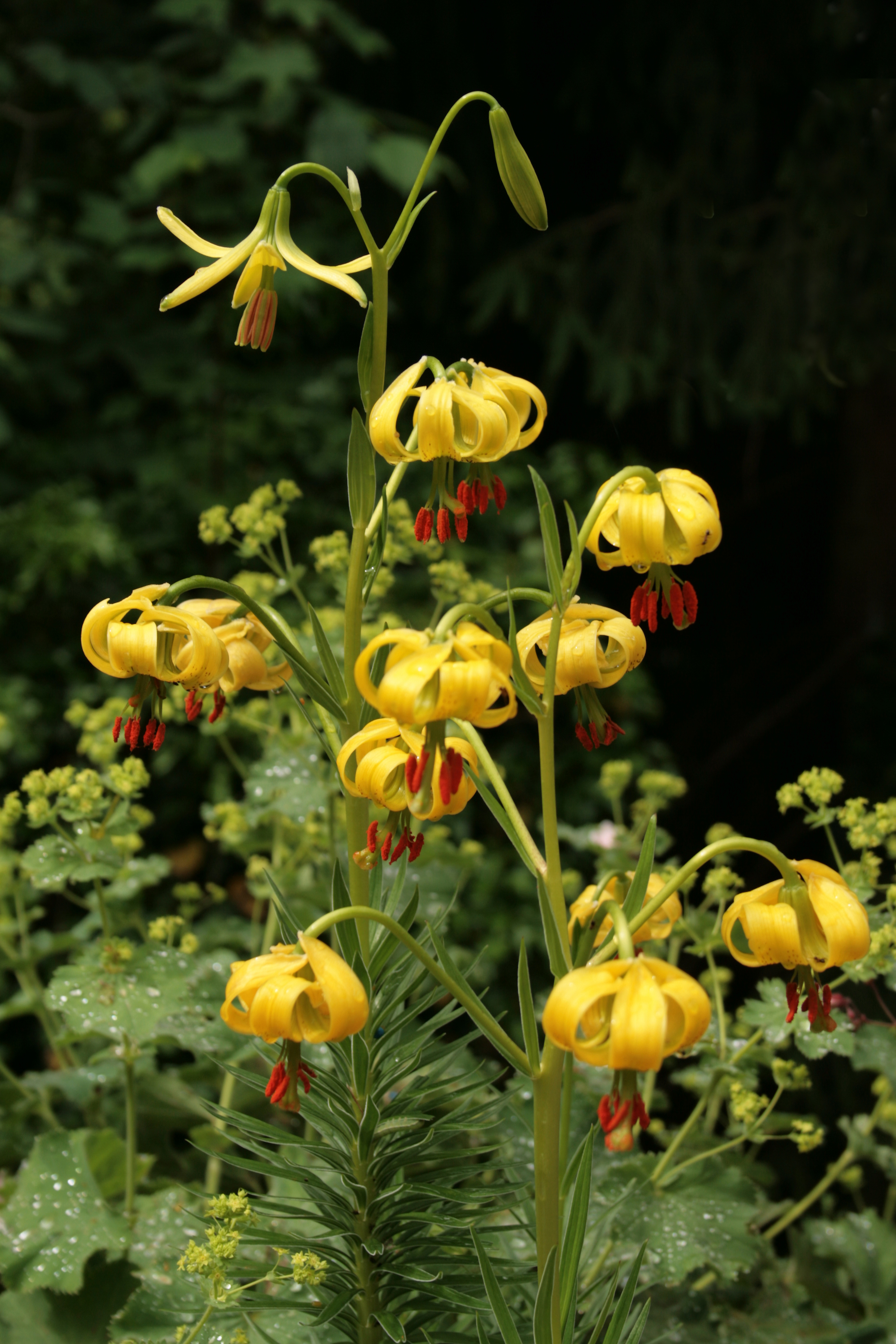

Scientific classification
- Kingdom: Plantae
- Clade: Tracheophytes
- Clade: Angiosperms
- Clade: Monocots
- Order: Liliales
- Family: Liliaceae
- Subfamily: Lilioideae
- Genus: Lilium
- Species: L. pyrenaicum

Binomial name
- Lilium pyrenaicum Gouan

= Lilium pyrenaicum =

Species of lily

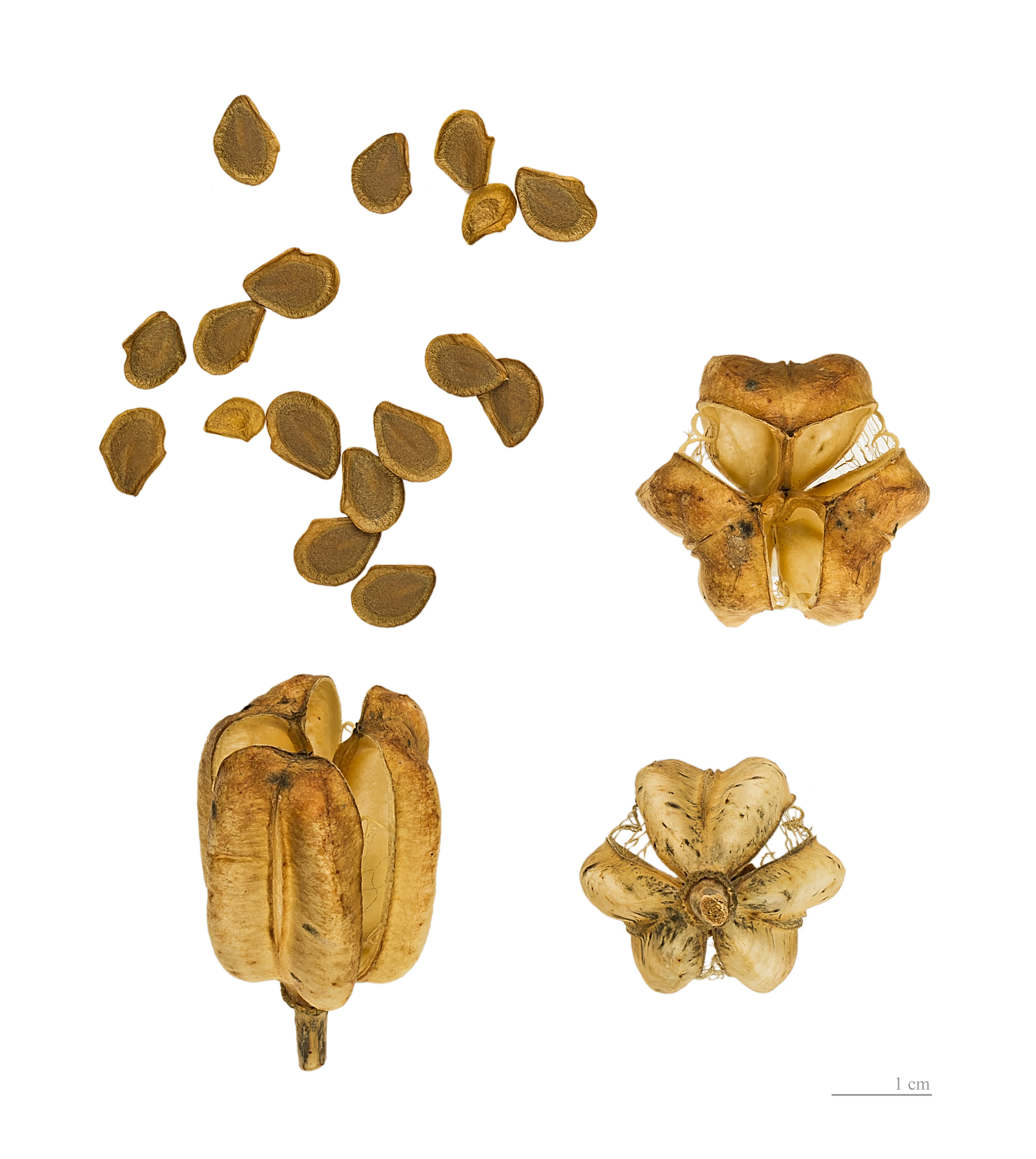
Capsules and seeds

Lilium pyrenaicum (Pyrenean lily, yellow Turk's-cap lily, yellow martagon lily) is native to montane regions, mainly the Pyrenees, from Spain and eastwards, with the range extending into the Caucasus. It grows up to 1.3 m high. It bears up to 12 Turks-cap shaped flowers. These are yellow, orange or red, and has an unusual musky scent, which some people find unpleasant.
