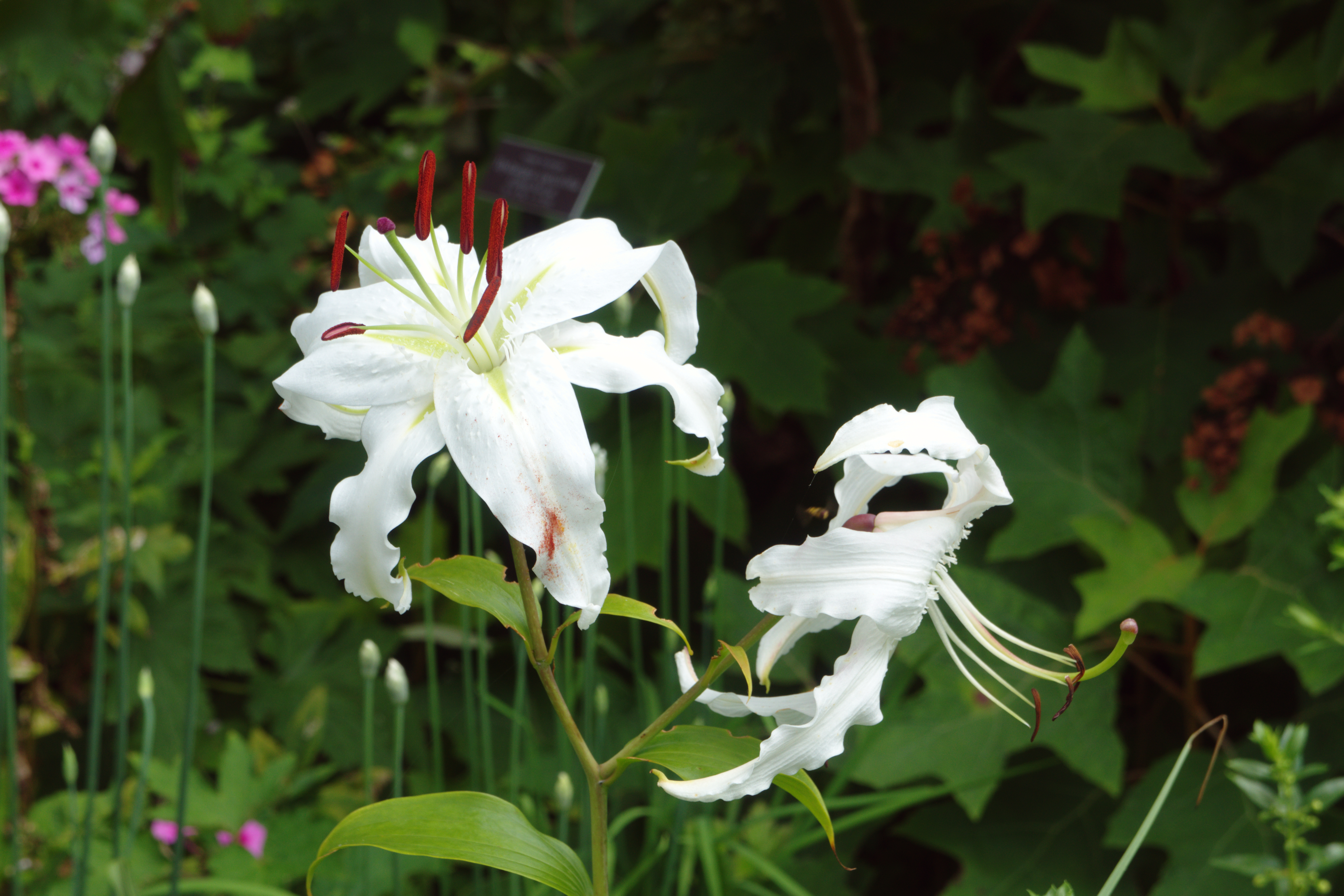
- A white cultivar

Scientific classification
- Kingdom: Plantae
- Clade: Tracheophytes
- Clade: Angiosperms
- Clade: Monocots
- Order: Liliales
- Family: Liliaceae
- Subfamily: Lilioideae
- Tribe: Lilieae
- Genus: Lilium
- Species: L. speciosum

Binomial name
- Lilium speciosum Thunb.

Synonyms
- Synonymy: Lilium superbum Thunb. 1784, illegitimate homonym not L. 1762; Lilium broussartii E.Morren; Lilium albiflorum Hook.; Lilium eximium Kunth; Lilium punctatum Lem.; Lilium vestale Mast.; Lilium konishii Hayata; Lilium melpomene Kronfeldt; Lilium kanahirae Hayata (syn of var. gloriosoides); plus numerous other names at the level of form or variety

= Lilium speciosum =

Species of plant

Lilium speciosum is an East Asian species of plants in the lily family. It is native to southern Japan and southern China, where it can be found at elevations of 600–900 metres (2,000–3,000 ft). It is sometimes called the Japanese lily though there are other species with this common name.

Lilium speciosum grows up to 1.2 metres (3 ft 11 in) tall and 0.3 metres (1 ft 0 in) wide, blooming from August to September in north temperate regions. The flowers are white to pink in colour, and strongly scented. It is later flowering than most other species. Many garden forms are in cultivation, and the species has been widely used for breeding of garden forms.

Lilium speciosum contains phenolic glycosides, such as 6′-O-feruloylsucrose and (25R,26R)-26-methoxyspirost-5-en-3β-ol 3-O-α-l-rhamnopyranosyl-(1→2)-β-d-glucopyranoside, and steroidal saponins.

Varieties

- Lilium speciosum var. gloriosoides Baker - China, Taiwan
- Lilium speciosum var. speciosum - Japan (Shikoku, Kyushu)
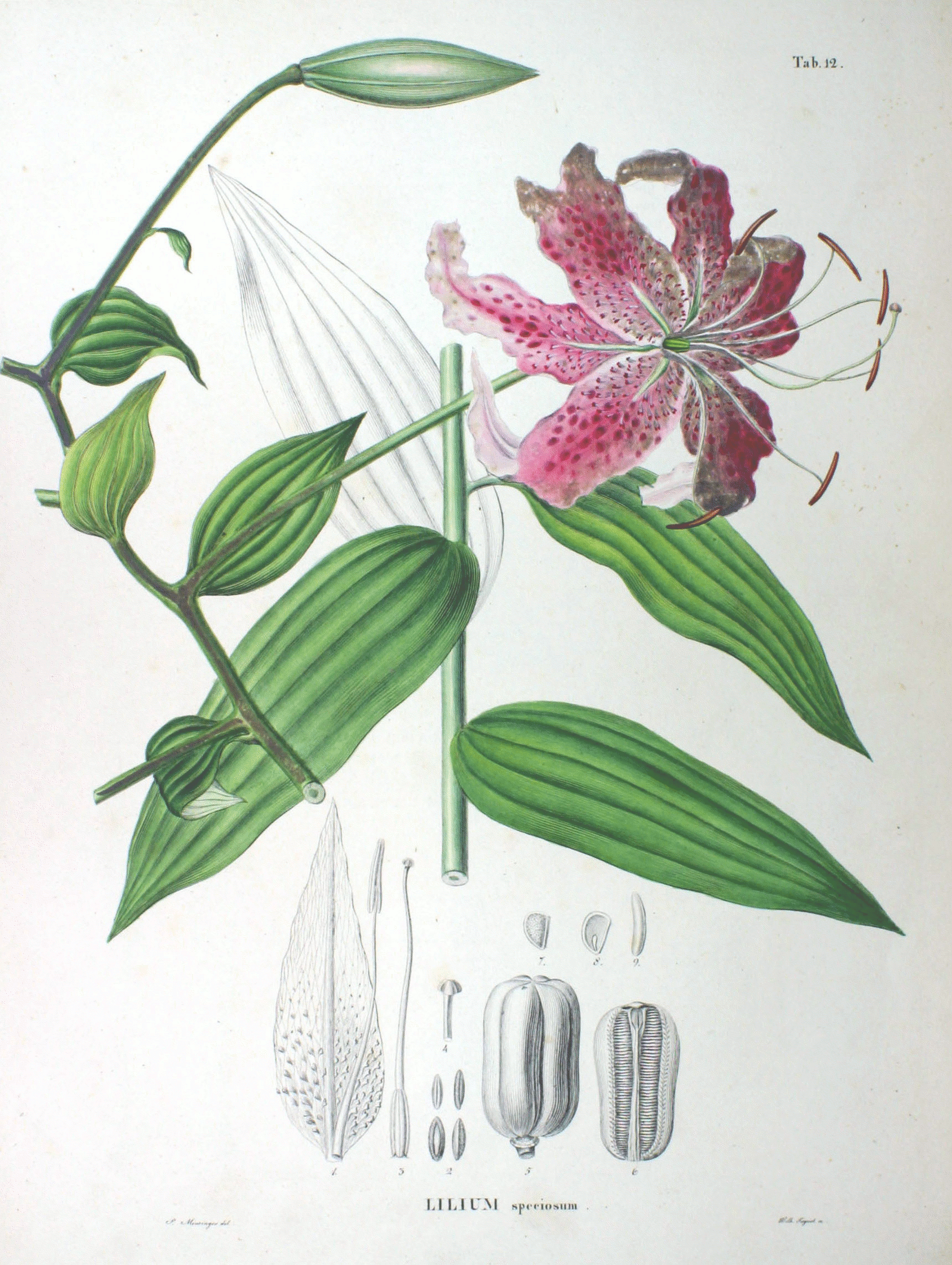
1870 illustration

== Toxicity ==
Lily pollen is toxic to domestic cats and ingestion is often fatal; households and gardens which are visited by cats are advised against growing lilies or placing lily flowers where a cat may brush against them and become dusted with pollen, which they then consume while cleaning. Suspected cases require urgent veterinary attention. Prompt treatment with activated charcoal and/or induced vomiting can reduce the amount of toxin absorbed, and large amounts of fluid by IV can reduce damage to kidneys to increase the chances of survival.
