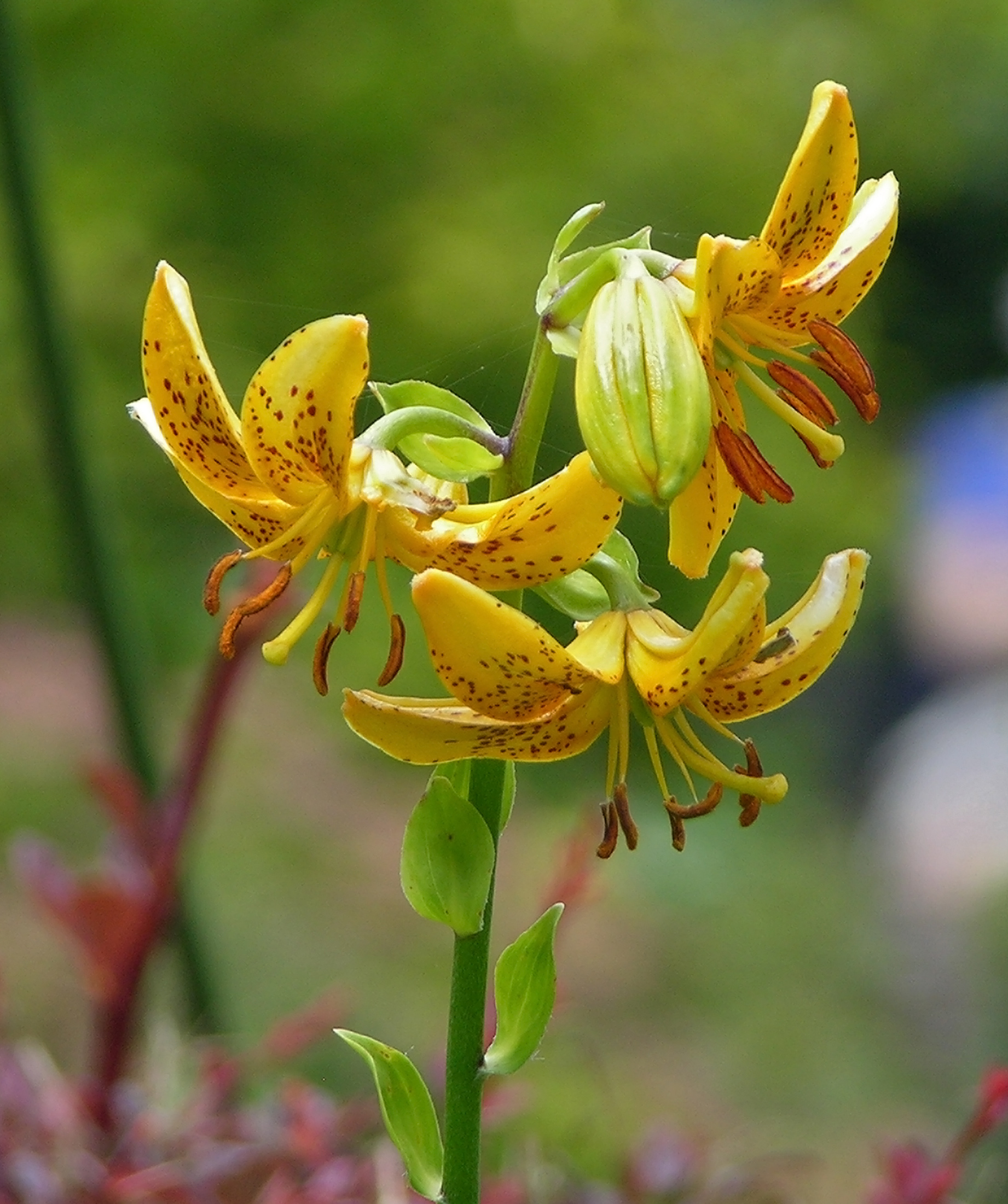

Scientific classification
- Kingdom: Plantae
- Clade: Tracheophytes
- Clade: Angiosperms
- Clade: Monocots
- Order: Liliales
- Family: Liliaceae
- Subfamily: Lilioideae
- Genus: Lilium
- Species: L. hansonii

Binomial name
- Lilium hansonii Leichtlin ex D.D.T.Moore

Synonyms
- Lilium hansonii Leichtlin ex Baker

= Lilium hansonii =

Hanson's lily

Species of lily

Lilium hansonii, known as Hanson's lily and Japanese Turk's-cap lily, is an East Asian species of plants in the lily family. It is native to Korea, Japan, and to Jilin Province in northeastern China, as well as being widely cultivated as an ornamental.

Lilium hansonii is a vigorous early–flowering stem–rooting true lily. It has elliptic to inversely lanced–shaped leaves, pale green, up to 7 inches (18 cm) long and carried in whorls of 12–20 leaves. In early summer it produces racemes of up 10–14 small, nodding, fragrant, flowers with recurved tepals of a brilliant orange–yellow. The tepals are fleshy and show purplish–brown spots near the base. The plant grows to 3–5 feet (1–1.5 m) tall.

Lilium hansonii is named for Peter Hanson (1821–1887), a Danish–born American landscape artist who was an aficionado of tulips and also grew lilies.
