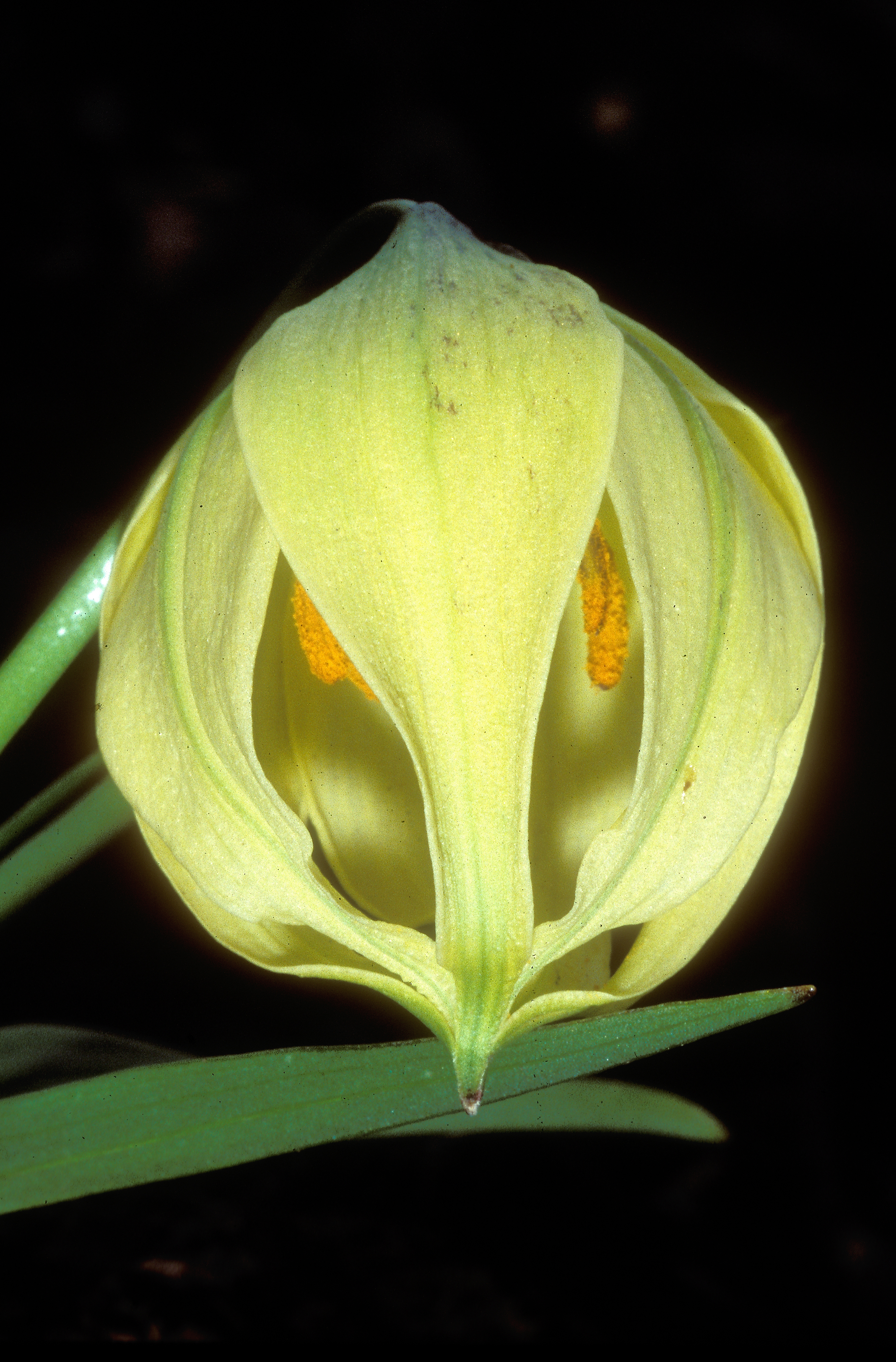
- Lilium lophophorum flower detail

Scientific classification
- Kingdom: Plantae
- Clade: Tracheophytes
- Clade: Angiosperms
- Clade: Monocots
- Order: Liliales
- Family: Liliaceae
- Subfamily: Lilioideae
- Tribe: Lilieae
- Genus: Lilium
- Species: L. lophophorum

Binomial name
- Lilium lophophorum (Bureau & Franch.) Franch.

Synonyms
- Fritillaria lophophora Bureau & Franch.; Nomocharis lophophora (Bureau & Franch.) W.E.Evans

= Lilium lophophorum =

Species of plant

Lilium lophophorum is a species of plant in the lily family Liliaceae. First described in 1898 by Adrien René Franchet and Édouard Bureau, it is found in the provinces of Sichuan, Yunnan, and the Tibet Autonomous Region of China, where it grows on mountain slopes and alpine regions of elevations between 2,500–4,500 metres (8,200–14,800 ft).

Having been initially classified in the genus Fritillaria, it was placed in the (now defunct) genus Nomocharis for some time, and considered for placement in its own genus at some point. It was then moved into the genus Lilium after J. Robert Sealy noted morphological similarities between Nomocharis subg. Oxypetala, which L. lophophorum was a part of, with the remainder of Lilium. Within the genus Lilium, it has been moved several times, being placed in groups Sinomartagon in 1949, Oxypetalum in 1974, and Lophophorum in 2000.

Lilium lophophorum is best known for the unique appearance of its flowers, having been highlighted by researchers for the breeding potential for other lilies. Their shape is a result of an adaptation by the plant in order to protect its reproductive structures from the torrential rains and UV radiation typical of the mountainous regions it inhabits. There are two known varieties, L. lophophorum var. lophophorum and L. lophophorum var. linearifolium.

== Description ==
The bulb of the plant is subovoid or conical in shape, with a diameter between 1.5–3.5 centimetres (0.59–1.38 in). The individual scales of the bulb are lax, sublanceolate and narrow in shape, tawny in colour, with a dimensions of 3.5–4 millimetres (0.14–0.16 in) by 6–7 millimetres (0.24–0.28 in).

The flower stalk is 10–15 centimetres (3.9–5.9 in) in height, and does not exceed 25 centimetres (9.8 in) in height, and described as glabrous. The plant as a whole is described as a "small plant" that does not grow higher than 25–30 centimetres (9.8–11.8 in), while Sealy described the height of the plant as 7–13.5 centimetres (2.8–5.3 in), and a description by Wu et al. noted a height range of between 10–45 centimetres (3.9–17.7 in).

The leaves are described as "highly variable", ranging from clustered to scattered, bright green in colour, and fleshy with papillose leaf margins. The shape of the leaves ranges from linear, narrowly lanceolate, lanceolate, or oblong-lanceolate, and unear. The leaf dimensions are 5–12 centimetres (2.0–4.7 in) by 0.3–2 centimetres (0.12–0.79 in). Leaves emerge from the base of the stem.

The flowers are typically solitary or rarely in groups of two or three, nodding downwards, with the 6.5 centimetres (2.6 in) long tepals drawn out into a long tail-like point with the tepal tips staying united, resembling a lantern in shape. The tepals are yellow, pale yellow, or a pale yellowish-green. The tepals either sport purple-red spots or are otherwise unspotted, and are lanceolate or ovate-lanceolate. Spotting on the tepals are typically restricted on the lower third of the tepal. Inner tepals bore fimbrate projections on both surfaces on the nectaries. Of the Lilium genera native to China, L. lophophorum is the sole species whose tepal arrangement was spherical. Pontus Wallsten notes that the floral shape is to ensure that the floral reproductive organs are protected from the heavy summer rains. This belief was shared by Gao, Harris, and He (2015), which postulated the campanulate shape protected the floral reproductive structures against the torrential rains and UV rays in the habitats it is found in. The flowers are sweetly scented. Flowering occurs between the months of June and July, and fruiting occurs from August to September.

The stamens converge with lengths between 1.5–2 centimetres (0.59–0.79 in), with the filaments glabrous. The anthers are between 7–10 millimetres (0.28–0.39 in) in length. The ovary has a dimensions of 1–1.2 by 3–4 centimetres (0.39 in–0.47 in × 1.18 in–1.57 in), and the capsule has dimensions of 2–3 by 1.5–2 centimetres (0.79 in–1.18 in × 0.59 in–0.79 in). Pollen analysis of L. lophophorum further justified its placement into the genus Lilium, showing apture and sculptural differences between the pollen of it and the (now defunct) genus Nomocharis. Showing an evolutionary aperture trend away from monocolpate pollen to porate, with similar pollen morphology to European genera Lilium bosniacum and L. carniolicum. Similar to the pollen of L. nanum, they are monocolpate or 2-3 porate, with similar pollen morphologies. Pollen analysis showed that L. lophophorum showed the most primitive exine patterning, the pattern of markings on the exterior of a pollen grain, within its genus.

== Distribution ==
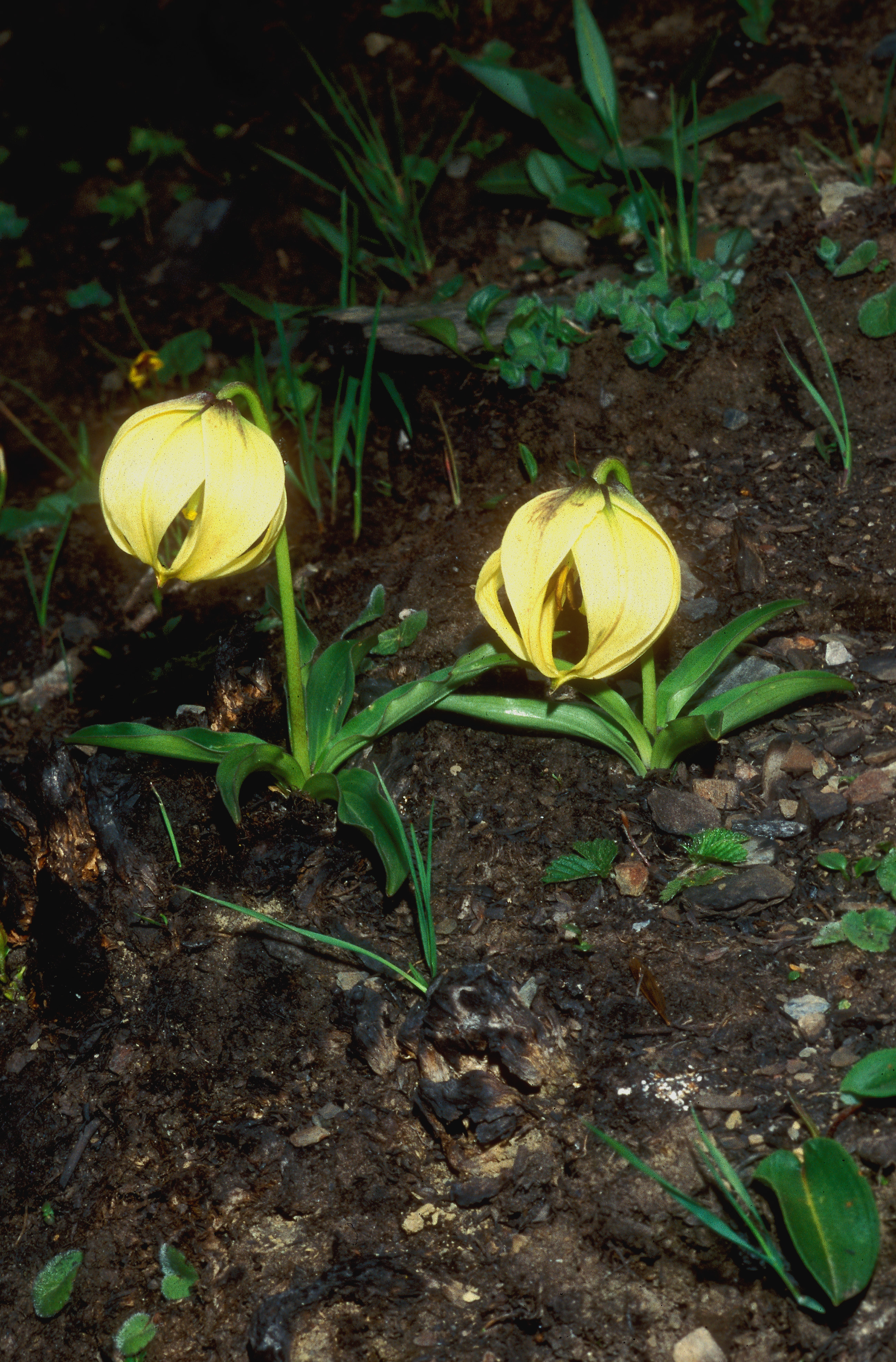
Lilium lophophorum in its native habitat on the Daxue Mountain Pass of Yunnan province. (Note: Gügel refers to the locale as "Big Snow Pass" in the original filename, this is presumably a translation of 大雪, which means "Big Snow". The mountain's location lines up with the described range of the plant.)

Lilium lophophorum has a restricted distribution, ranging from Western China to Southeastern Tibet, with the first collection records originating from Sikang. (Note: Sealy refers to L. lophophorum as being found in "Sikang", a now-defunct province of the Republic of China which nowadays is split between the autonomous region of Tibet and the province of Sichuan.) In China, it is found in Sichuan, Yunnan, and the Tibet Autonomous Region. The southernmost record for L. lophophorum was a specimen collected by Forrest in Yunnan province, on the Chienchuan-Mekong divide.

Sealy noted that var. lophophorum was found in southwest Sichuan on Mount Siga, northwest Yunnan on the mountains of the Chungtien Plateau, and on the Chienchuan-Mekong divide, and in Sikang between Batang and Litang, Tachienlu, Tongolo, Baurong to Tachienlu through Hadjaha, the Muli Mountains, Dzampe sheren Mountain, west of Wuato Gomba, East Muli, Litang Range divide southwest of Muli. (Note: Batang is Batang County, Litang is Litang County, Tachienlu is Kangding, Tongolo is Dongeluo within Kangding county, Baurong is Baworong Township of Jiulong County, of Garzê Tibetan Autonomous Prefecture. Muli probably refers to Muli Tibetan Autonomous County, which was formerly a kingdom. Collection records from the time noted a "Muli (or Mili) Kingdom") A modern study notes the distribution of L. lophophorum var. lophophorum in Yunnan province was in Dali, Deqin (Baimangxueshan), Gongshan, Heqing, Lijiang (Mahuangchang and Yulongxueshan), Ninglang, Weixi (Sunluka), and Xiangelila (Xianrendong). While var. linearifolium was found in northwest Yunnan, on Mount Chintsi, Mount Kin-tzu (Dsho-yu nolu), and Mount Yun-lu, southwest of the Lichiang snow range, a contemporary account notes it is found in Lijiang, Yunnan. var. linearifolium is noted to be endemic to Yunnan province.

=== Habitat ===
It is found in forest edges, thicket margins, fir forest margins, bushy slopes, grassy slopes, and alpine grasslands between elevations of 2,500–4,500 metres (8,200–14,800 ft). These habitats which the plant inhabits experience torrential rain and face strong ultraviolet radiation. var. linearifolium was found in alpine grasslands with elevations from 3,500–4,000 metres (11,500–13,100 ft), preferring cool conditions with soils rich in humus with little disturbance.

== Taxonomy ==
Lilium lophophorum was first described in 1898 by Adrien René Franchet and Édouard Bureau in the Journal de Botanique (Morot).

Lilium lophophorum has had several taxonomic proposals, having been initially considered a member of the genus Fritillaria, Nomocharis, or even as a unique genus altogether. For a while, it was classified as a member of the genus Nomocharis, and placed within the subgenus Oxypetala as one of its four members alongside N. euxantha (now Lilium euxanthum), N. nana (now Lilium nanum), and N. oxypetala (now Lilium oxypetalum). J. Robert Sealy described the four species as "[agreeing] so well in technical characters that they can be considered together," with all comprising dwarf one-flowered plants sporting nodding or horizontal, cupular or funnel-shaped flowers. Sealy highlighted the differences in the perigone, outer sepals, and stamens, which resembled Lilium more than Nomocharis, enough so that he remarked that "their retention in that genus is not justified."

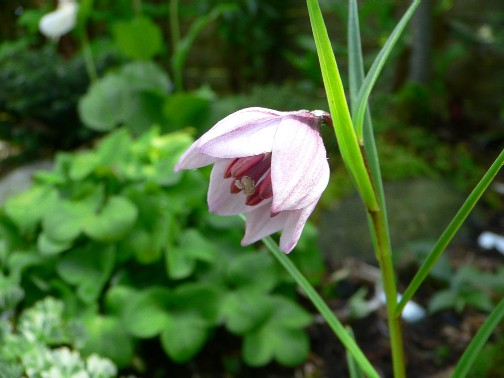
The closely related Lilium nanum inhabits similar environments to L. lophophorum and has developed a similar habit to it, with a campanulate flower to protect reproductive structures from the torrential rains and UV light.

Nomocharis in its entirety was eventually subsumed into the genus Lilium, with those members formed the Lophophorum subgroup in the group Sinomartagon. L. lophophorum was placed into Sinomartagon 5c by Comber in 1949, before being placed into section Oxypetalum by De Jong in 1974, and then into section Lophophorum in Liang and Tamura's 2000 Flora of China. Group Sinomartagon was divided into three clades after genetic research had determined that the group was polyphyletic, with Sinomartagon, Lophophorum, and the Lilium duchartreis clades being made. Through Bayesian analysis, the genome of Lilium lophophorum was determined to be in clade Lophophorum, one of eleven proposed clades of the genus Lilium. Initially erected to comprise members of the genus which possessed campanulate nodding flowers by Wang and Tang, Liang and Haw modified the scope of the group to encompass the Nomocharis-like members of Sinomartagon. The other members of the Lophophorum clade are: L. stewartianum, L. matangense, and L. nanum, the last of which belong in Lophophorum clade I. Further studies by Dan Mei Su et al. noted close phylogenetic relationships between L. lophophorum, the preceding three genera, L. duchartrei, and L. lankongense. Through pollen grain analysis and its restricted distribution, it was inferred by Yan-Ping Zhou et al. that group Lophophorum was relatively among the most primitive of the Lilium groups.

=== Varieties ===
There are two recognized varieties for Lilium lophophorum:

- Lilium lophophorum var. linearifolium (Sealy) S.Yun Liang
- Lilium lophophorum var. lophophorum

For var. lophophorum, the leaves are narrowly lanceolate, lanceolate, or oblong-lanceolate, with the tepals having sparse purple-red spots or they are unspotted. For var. linearifolium, the leaves are linear, having 15-16 linear leaves clustered in the middle of the plant, and the tepals sport obvious purple-red spots. Sealy described two forms for L. lophophorum var. lophophorum, which he referred to as subsp. typicum, forma latifolium and forma wardii.

== Human interactions ==
A study by Yun-peng Du et al. which rated Chinese Lilium on a five-point scale for their economic viability highlighted their potential economic and decorative worth, but had scored lower due to their "small height" and "feeble potency". They highlighted the unique spherical shape of the flowers and yellowish green colouration as highlighting "good breeding potential". This same sentiment was shared by Wu et al., which highlighted the unique floral shape's potential within the scope of lily breeding. The ornamental value was placed at 2.516 (out of 5), utilization potential as 0.916, and ecological adaptability at 0.279, for an overall score of 3.711, placing it at Rank III. The other 3 genera placed in Rank III were: L. amoenum, L. bakerianum var. delavayi, and L. pumilum. Hybrids between L. lophophorum var. linearifolium and Lilium longiflorum was produced in 2009 through ovule culture by Jie Wang et al. Lilium lophophorum var. linearifolium was highlighted by Jie Wang et al. as an important germplasm resource within the horticultural and economical spheres due to its vivid colour, resistance to low temperatures, and disease resistance.

Lilium lophophorum is described as a rare species by Yun-peng Du et al., with a single specimen collected during their survey. The Chinese name for Lilium lophophorum is 尖被百合, jian bei bai he. L. lophophorum var. linearifolium is 线叶百合, xiàn yè bǎi hé.
