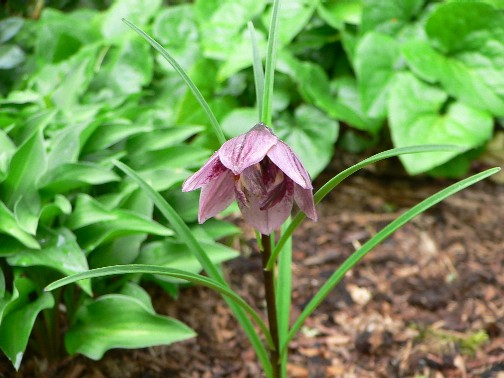

Scientific classification
- Kingdom: Plantae
- Clade: Tracheophytes
- Clade: Angiosperms
- Clade: Monocots
- Order: Liliales
- Family: Liliaceae
- Subfamily: Lilioideae
- Tribe: Lilieae
- Genus: Lilium
- Species: L. nanum

Binomial name
- Lilium nanum Klotzsch

= Lilium nanum =

Species of plant

Lilium nanum is a species belonging to the lily family (Liliaceae). The species is widespread throughout the Himalayas and is one of the genus's smallest species. Lilium nanum was discovered in 1845 on a journey by Prince Waldemar of Prussia. The name was first described in 1860.

== Description ==
Lilium nanum is a perennial herbaceous plant that grows from 8 to 42 cm tall. The oblong-ovate-shaped bulbs have a height of 2 to 4 cm and a diameter of 1 to 2.3 cm. The white, narrowly lanceolate, and overlapping scales, which range from 9 to 22 cm, resemble roof tiles. They generally measure between 2 and 2.5 cm high and between 0.3 and 0.8 cm wide.

The green stem is thin, erect, cylindrical, and hairless, and thickens from 0.15 to 0.3 cm. It is equally covered from the base to almost the end with 8 to 14 spirally arranged stem leaves that range in size from wide to narrow-linear and measure between 5 and 15.5 cm in length and 0.2 to 0.7 cm wide. They consist of three to seven diffuse veins, are glabrous, with a blunt to rounded tip, and are concave adaxially (facing the axis). Lower leaves are significantly smaller, possibly even to the size of membranous stipules.

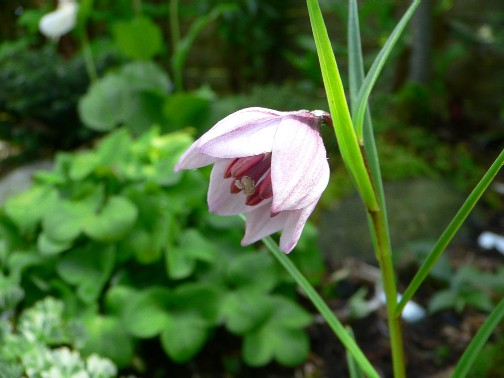
Lilium nanum

In June, the plant develops a terminal, nodding, bell-shaped solitary flower. The pedicel is long and twisted, and it ranges in length from 0.5 to 5.5 cm. The flowers of the flavidum variety are mostly purple to violet with very little pale yellow. The six petals of the outer circle are about the same size and form as the inner circle's six petals, which are a little shorter and wider. Tiny papillae are scattered throughout its tip. The outer bracts are lanceolate, somewhat extended at the tip, 1.2 to 4 cm long, and range in width from 0.3 to 1.2 cm. They also include roundish nectar that is about 0.1 cm in diameter. The base's internal surface is heavily papillose and fringed. The inner petals are oblong-rounded to elliptic, 1.1–3.8 cm long, 0.4–1.6 cm wide, and somewhat expanded at the tip. They each have a base that is more fringed on the inside than the outside and are made up of an expanded elliptical nectary with a 0.3 cm diameter.

The thin, hairless stamens, which vary in length between 0.1 and 1.3 cm long, face one another. After they have opened, the anthers are 0.3 to 0.4 mm long, oblong-round, acuminate, and up to 0.6 mm long. The heavily ribbed ovary is cylindrical or oblong round to cylindrical,0.5 to 1 cm long, and 0.2 to 0.6 mm thick. The stigma is trilobed and 3 to 4 mm in diameter, while the style is 0.3 to 1.1 cm long and glabrous. The yellow seed pods that mature in September have purple ribs and are generally elliptical in shape, measuring 2.5 to 2.7 cm long and 2 cm in diameter. The seeds are flat, almost triangular, thinly winged, 0.4 to 0.5 cm in length, and germinate immediately-epigean.

== Distribution and habitat ==
The species is native to the Himalayas. It occurs in Sikkim, Nepal, Bhutan, southwestern China (Sichuan, Tibet, and Yunnan), as well as northern Myanmar. It inhabits altitudes between 3500 m and 4500 m above sea level, but is also found above the tree line; Turrill cites findings at 5795 m. According to reports from Nepal, Tibet, Sikkim, and Bhutan, it appears to be widespread and flourishing in the monsoon season.

In addition to open, grassy, and frequently rocky hillsides, it also lives in alpine thickets, pine woods, and forest edges. It also occasionally lives in shady, protected areas close to junipers, rhododendrons, and dwarf birch trees.

== Classification ==
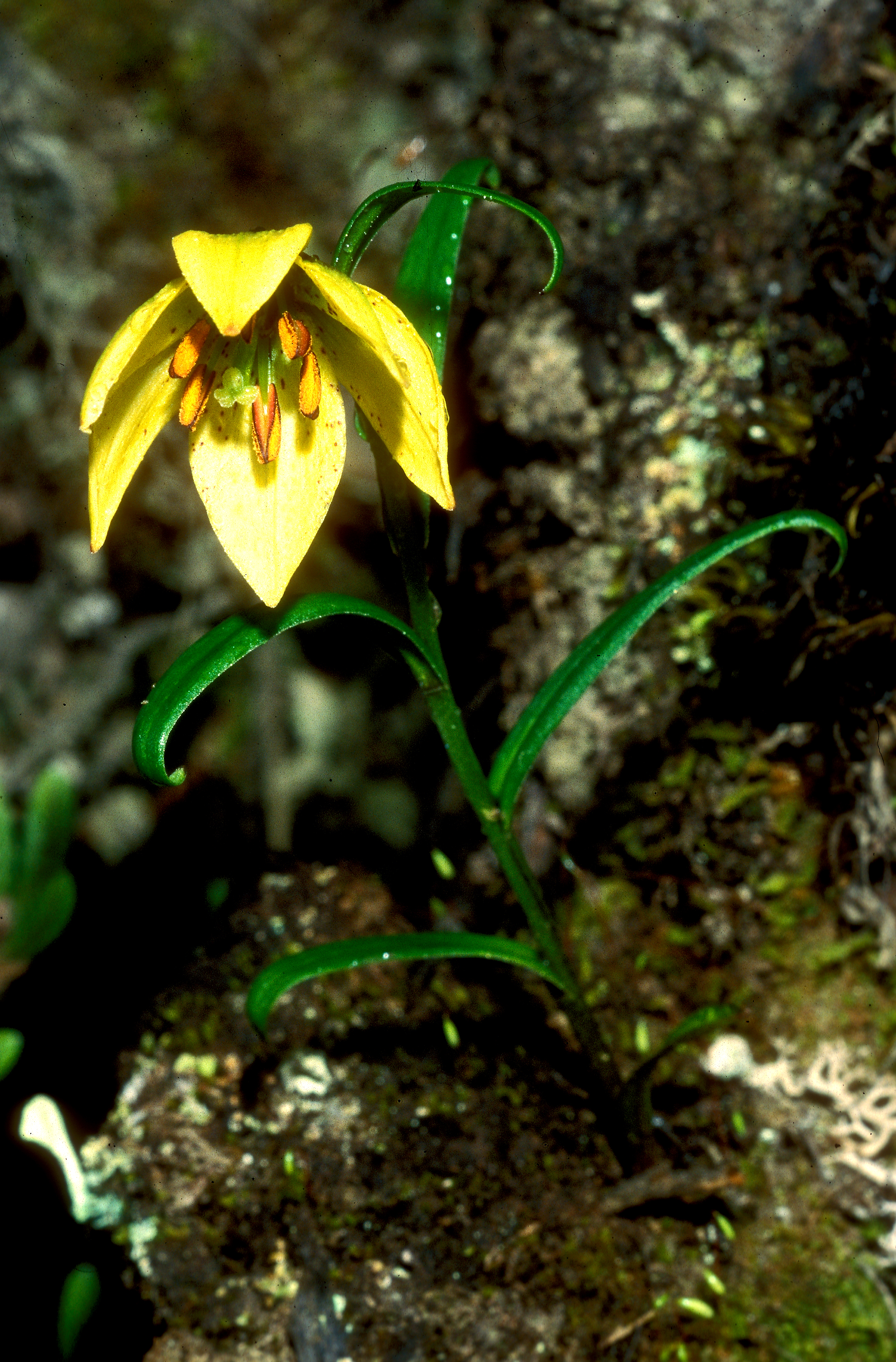
L. nanum var. flavidum, Yunnan

According to Harold Comber, Lilium nanum is a typical instance of a dwarf lily species and, in the traditional categorization approach, it belongs to the genus's largest section, Sinomartagon.

According to recent molecular genetic studies, the section is not monophyletic and is divided into at least two groups, which are not yet clearly broken down. Lilium nanum was provisionally assigned to the "Pseudo-Sinomartagon." The morphologically highly similar Lilium oxypetalum, which is also related to the genus Nomocharis, was found to be the direct sister taxon.

The internal systematics of the species was controversial but are now largely clarified. There are numerous other forms besides the nominate one.

- Lilium nanum var. flavidum: The flowers are yellow in color. The variety occurs exclusively in Tibet, Yunnan, and Myanmar.

== Botanical history ==
Lilium nanum was collected in 1845 by Werner Hoffmeister, the friend, physician, and traveling companion of Prince Waldemar of Prussia during his journey through Asia, but the precise location and date of the gathering are unknown, as Hoffmeister died in the Battle of Ferozeshah on December 21–22, 1845.

The botanical processing of the collected material was done by Johann Friedrich Klotzsch in Berlin. He wrote the initial description but died in 1860 before finishing the manuscript on the entire work. Christian August Friedrich Garcke completed this and published "Die botanischen Ergebnisse der Reise seiner König" in 1862. Klotzsch is the only author because the first description therein was all his own creation. The Latin word "nanus" (which means "dwarf") in the species epithet to the plant's unusually short height.

The type specimen has not been preserved; it was last verifiably seen by John Gilbert Baker in 1875. It is remarkable that the first description with "Bloom...white" and "finely pubescent", are two characteristics that contradict the species' present knowledge.

Starting in 1900, many species variants were redescribed with increasingly frequent specimens, including transfer to other genera. Hooker (1892) and Rendle (1906) classified specimens as Fritillaria, while Ernest Henry Wilson listed the species under the genus Nomocharis in 1925 without providing any further context. Once thought to be a separate species, Lilium euxanthum, the variation flavidum is no longer commonly accepted. However, Lilium nanum var. brevistylum, which was initially identified as a subspecies of Lilium nanum in 1980, was later recognized as a distinct species.

== Evidence ==
- W.B. Turrill. A Supplement to Elwes' Monograph of the Genus Lilium, Part IX, 1962. pp. 9–12.
- Flora of China, Vol. 24, S. 139, Online
- Mark Wood. Lily Species - Notes and Images. CD-ROM, Version from 13. July 2006.
