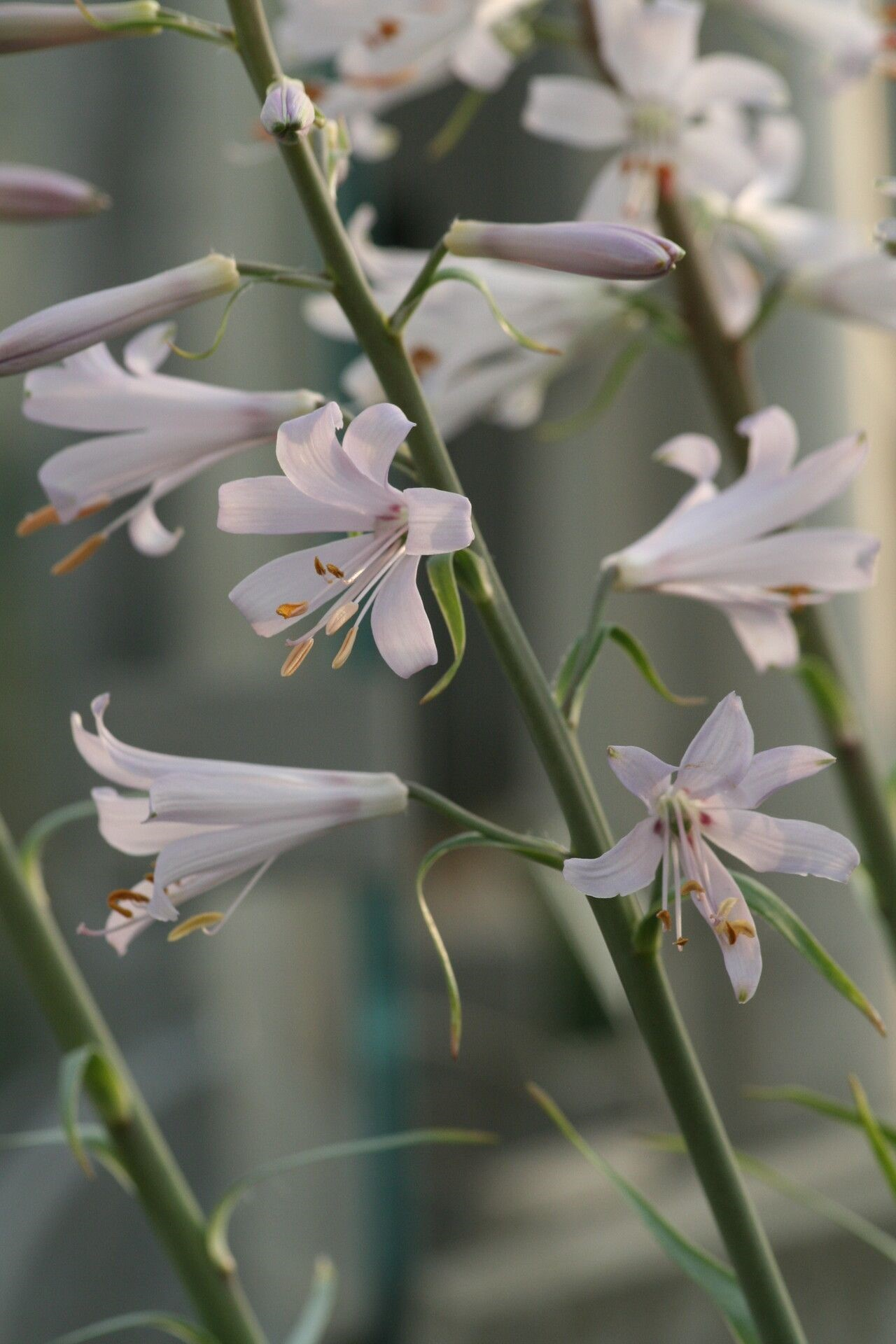
- Notholirion thomsonianum

Scientific classification
- Kingdom: Plantae
- Clade: Tracheophytes
- Clade: Angiosperms
- Clade: Monocots
- Order: Liliales
- Family: Liliaceae
- Subfamily: Lilioideae
- Tribe: Lilieae
- Genus: Notholirion; Wall. ex Boiss.

Type species
- Notholirion thomsonianum (Royle) Stapf

= Notholirion =

Genus of plants

Notholirion is a small Asian genus of bulbous plants in the lily family, Liliaceae. It is closely related to Lilium, but each individual flowers only once, and then dies after producing offsets. The bulb is covered by a tunic. Leaves are basal, produced in autumn and winter.

== Taxonomy ==
Baker (1874) considered Notholirion to be a subgenus of Fritillaria, but Boissier (1884) separated it as a distinct genus. The evolutionary and phylogenetic relationships between the genera currently included in Liliaceae are shown in the following Cladogram:

Cladogram: Phylogeny and biogeography of the genera of the Liliaceae

- Liliaceae
  - - West NA
      - Tricyrtis
      - - Streptopoideae
          - Streptopus
          - - Prosartes
            - Scoliopus
  - - West NA
      Calochortus
    - Lilioideae* East NA EA
      - Medeoleae East NA
        - Clintonia
        - Medeola
      - Lilieae s.l. EA
        - Tulipeae East Asia
          - - Tulipa
            - - Amana
              - Erythronium
          - - Gagea (Lloydia)
        - Lilieae s.s. Himalayas
          - Notholirion
          - - Cardiocrinum
            - - Lilium (Nomocharis)
              - Fritillaria

Phylogenetic tree reflecting relationships based on molecular phylogenetic evidence.
*=Liliaceae sensu Tamura; EA=Eurasia NA=North America

=== Species ===
List of species:

- Notholirion bulbiferum (Lingelsh.) Stearn - Nepal, Bhutan, Sikkim, Assam, Myanmar, Gansu, Shaanxi, Sichuan, Tibet, Yunnan
- Notholirion koeiei Rech.f. - Iran + Iraq
- Notholirion macrophyllum (D.Don) Boiss. - Tibet, Nepal, Sichuan, Yunnan, Bhutan, and Sikkim
- Notholirion thomsonianum (Royle) Stapf - Afghanistan, Himalayas of northern Pakistan + northern India

== Bibliography ==
- Baker, J. G. (1874). "Revision of the Genera and Species of Tulipeae". Botanical Journal of the Linnean Society. xiv (76). Fritillaria pp. 251–275. doi:10.1111/j.1095-8339.1874.tb00314.x.
- Boissier, Pierre Edmond (1884). "Notholirion". Flora Orientalis: sive, Enumeratio plantarum in Oriente a Graecia et Aegypto ad Indiae fines hucusque observatarum. Vol. 5. Geneva: H. Georg. pp. 190–191.
