= Tulipeae =

Tribe of flowering plants

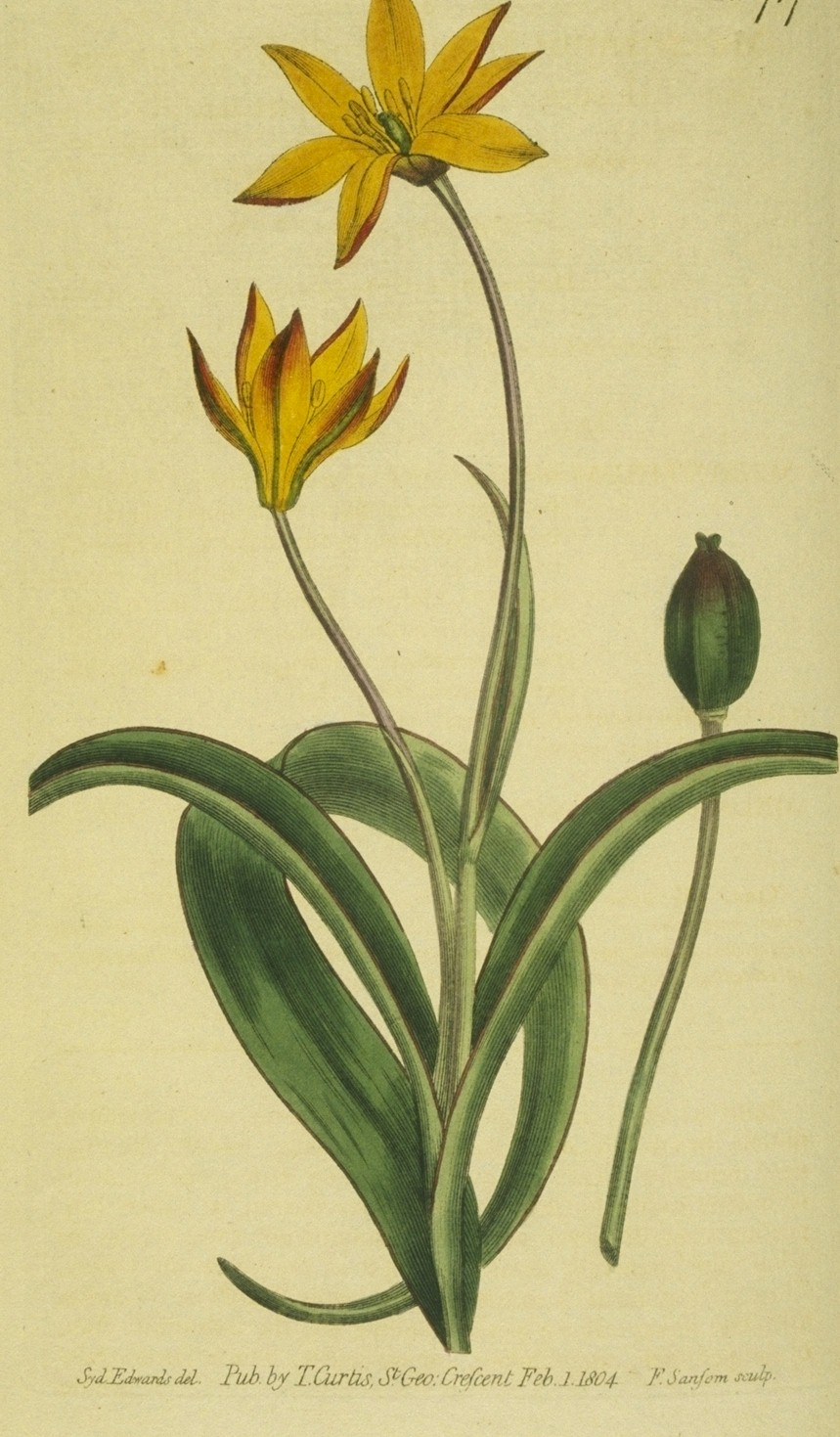
Tulipa sylvestris subsp. australis with seedpod (right), 1804

The Tulipeae (syn. Tulipoideae) Duby is a tribe of monocotyledon perennial, herbaceous mainly bulbous flowering plants in the Liliaceae (lily) family. As originally conceived by Duby (1828), "Tulipaceae" was a tribe within Liliaceae, consisting of the genera Tulipa, Fritillaria and Lilium.

== Description ==
Herbaceous non-climbing bulbous plants. Bulbs consisting of a single scale. Anthers pseudo-basifixed. fruit consists of a loculicidal capsule, seeds not winged. Tetrasporic embryo-sac formation with 7–8 nuclei. Nucella having a short base. Vesicular-arbuscular mycorrhizae (VAM) non-Clintonia type. Chromosomes large - 2–11 μm (1–6 μm in Gagea). Genome size (3)4–25(70) pg, x = (9)12. Polyploidy common.

== Taxonomy ==
Tulipeae remained a core group of the Liliaceae, containing the type genus, Lilium for most of its taxonomic history. For instance, Bentham and Hooker (1883), placed Lilium together with Tulipa and five other genera in Liliaceae tribe Tulipeae.

In the modern era, Takhtadzhi︠an described the tribe as having four genera:

- Tulipa
- Amana (considered by some to be included in Tulipa)
- Holongia (Note: Holongia: A genus only recognised by Takhtadzhi︠an)
- Erythronium

Later only Tulipa and Erythronium were included, and Gagea was added. Tulipeae has been variously constructed, chiefly as either a tribe of the subfamily Lilioideae, or a subfamily of Liliaceae itself (Tulipoideae). However it has been proposed that Gagea should be in its own tribe, the Lloydieae.

The evolutionary and phylogenetic relationships of Tulipeae within Liliaceae are shown in the following Cladogram.

Cladogram: Phylogeny and biogeography of the genera of the Liliaceae

- Liliaceae
  - - West NA
      - Tricyrtis
      - - Streptopoideae
          - Streptopus
          - - Prosartes
            - Scoliopus
  - - West NA
      Calochortus
    - Lilioideae* East NA EA
      - Medeoleae East NA
        - Clintonia
        - Medeola
      - Lilieae s.l. EA
        - Tulipeae East Asia
          - - Tulipa
            - - Amana
              - Erythronium
          - - Gagea (Lloydia)
        - Lilieae s.s. Himalayas
          - Notholirion
          - - Cardiocrinum
            - - Lilium (Nomocharis)
              - Fritillaria

Phylogenetic tree reflecting relationships based on molecular phylogenetic evidence.
*=Liliaceae sensu Tamura; EA=Eurasia NA=North America

Here, Tulipeae is shown as a clade within the broader construction of Lileae (sensu lato), or as a separate biogeographical tribe if the narrow sense of Lileae (sensu stricto) is adopted, with Lileae and Tulipeae as sister groups. The continuing use of Tulipeae as a separate tribe is supported by several authors.

=== Genera ===
Genera (species)

- Amana Honda (5)
- Erythronium L. (15)
- Gagea Salisb. (=Lloydia Salisb.) (ca. 300)
- Tulipa L. (ca. 150)

Gagea is sister to the other three genera.

=== Synonyms ===
- Gageeae Rouy, Fl. France 12: 380. 1910.
- Lloydieae Buxb., Bot. Arch. 38: 389. 1937.
- Tulipoideae Kostel, Allg. Med.-Pharm. Fl. 1: 168. 1831.

== Bibliography ==
- Bentham, G.; Hooker, J.D. (1862–1883). "Tulipeae". Genera plantarum ad exemplaria imprimis in herbariis kewensibus servata definita (in Latin). Vol. 3. London: L Reeve & Co. pp. 759–760.
- Brands, S.J., ed. (25 April 2017). "Tribe Tulipeae". Systema Naturae 2000. The Taxonomicon. Universal Taxonomic Services.
- Duby, Jean Étienne (April 1828). "Tulipaceae". Botanicon Gallicum; seu, Synopsis plantarum in flora Gallica descriptarum 2 vols. Vol. 1 (2nd ed.). pp. 461–463.
- F. Buxbaum (1937), "Die Entwicklungslinien der Lilioideae. II. Die systematische Stellung der gattung Gagea", Botanisches Archiv (in German), vol. 38, pp. 305ff
- Peruzzi, L.; I. J. Leitch; K.F. Caparelli (2009). "Chromosome diversity and evolution in Liliaceae". Annals of Botany. 103 (3): 459–475. doi:10.1093/aob/mcn230. PMC 2707325. PMID 19033282.
- Baker, J. G. (1874). "Revision of the Genera and Species of Tulipeae". Journal of the Linnean Society of London, Botany. xiv (76): 211–310. doi:10.1111/j.1095-8339.1874.tb00314.x.
- Leitch, I. J.; Beaulieu, JM; Cheung, K; Hanson, L; Lysak, MA; Fay, MF (November 2007). "Punctuated genome size evolution in Liliaceae". Journal of Evolutionary Biology. 20 (6): 2296–308. doi:10.1111/j.1420-9101.2007.01416.x. PMID 17956392.
- Kim, Jung Sung; Hong, Jeong-Ki; Chase, Mark W.; Fay, Michael F.; Kim, Joo-Hwan (May 2013). "Familial relationships of the monocot order Liliales based on a molecular phylogenetic analysis using four plastid loci: matK, rbcL, atpB and atpF-H". Botanical Journal of the Linnean Society. 172 (1): 5–21. doi:10.1111/boj.12039.
- Peruzzi, L. (11 January 2016). "A new infrafamilial taxonomic setting for Liliaceae, with a key to genera and tribes". Plant Biosystems. 150 (6): 1341–1347. doi:10.1080/11263504.2015.1115435. S2CID 88042387.
- Takhtadzhi︠a︡n, Armen Leonovich (2009). Flowering Plants. Springer. ISBN 978-1402096099.
- Watson, Sereno (1879). "Revision of the North American Liliaceae: Descriptions of Some New Species of North American Plants". Proceedings of the American Academy of Arts and Sciences. XIV: 213–312. doi:10.2307/25138538. JSTOR 25138538.
