= Cardiocrinum cathayanum =

Scientific classification
- Kingdom: Plantae
- Clade: Tracheophytes
- Clade: Angiosperms
- Clade: Monocots
- Order: Liliales
- Family: Liliaceae
- Subfamily: Lilioideae
- Tribe: Lilieae
- Genus: Cardiocrinum
- Species: C. cathayanum

Binomial name
- Cardiocrinum cathayanum (E.H.Wilson) Stearn

Synonyms
- Lilium cathayanum E.H.Wilson

Species of flowering plant

Cardiocrinum cathayanum is a species of Chinese plants in the lily family, with large showy flowers. It is native to the Provinces of Anhui, Fujian, Henan, Hubei, Hunan, Jiangsu, Jiangxi, and Zhejiang.

Cardiocrinum cathayanum is similar to the more widespread and commonly cultivated C. giganteum, but it C. cathayanum generally has only 3-5 flowers per raceme, as compared to 10-16 flowers in C. giganteum.
