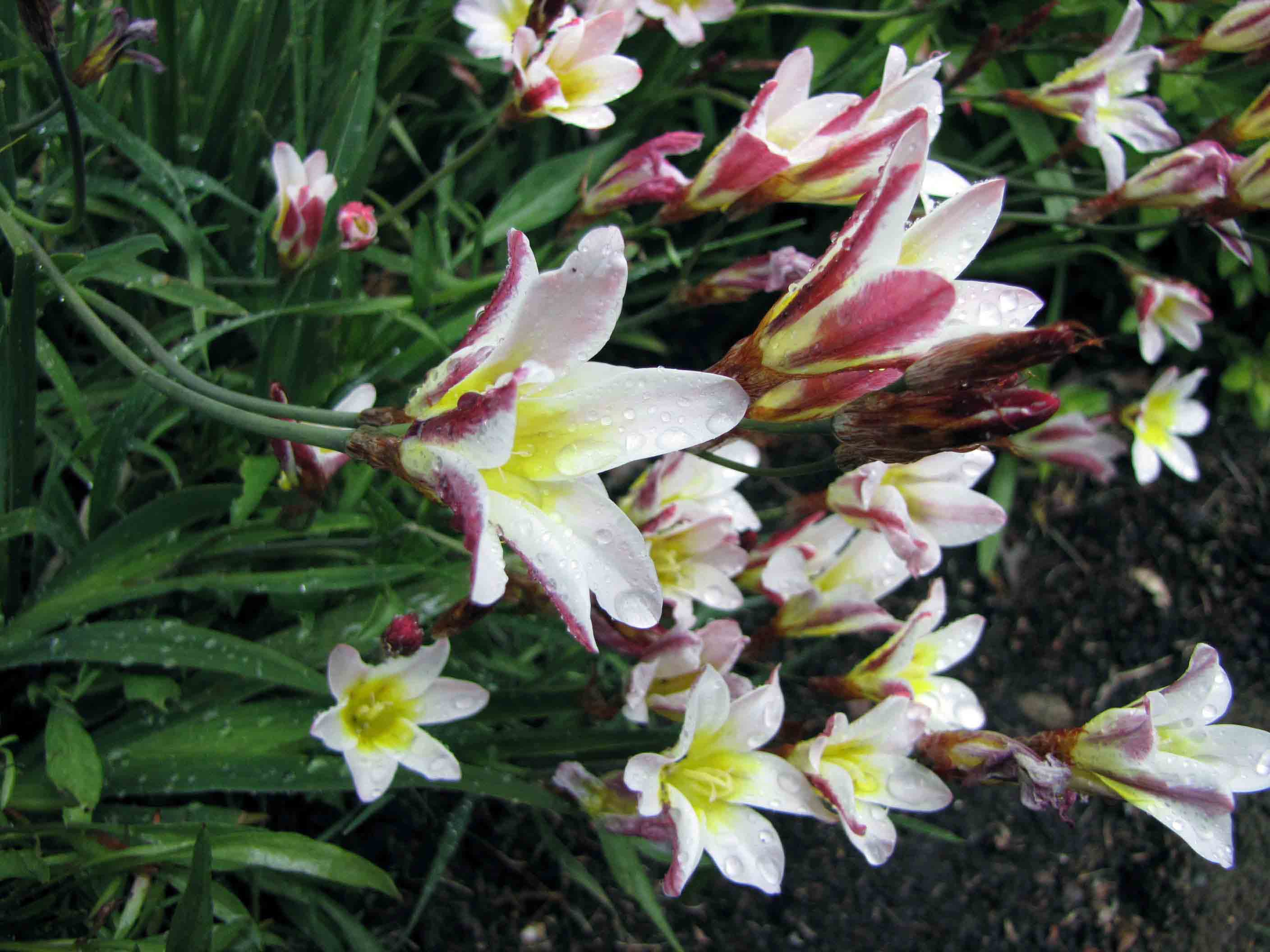

Scientific classification
- Kingdom: Plantae
- Clade: Tracheophytes
- Clade: Angiosperms
- Clade: Monocots
- Order: Liliales
- Family: Liliaceae
- Subfamily: Lilioideae
- Tribe: Lilieae
- Genus: Amana
- Species: A. anhuiensis

Binomial name
- Amana anhuiensis (X.S.Shen) Christenh.

Synonyms
- Tulipa anhuiensis X.S.Shen

= Amana anhuiensis =

Species of flowering plant

Amana anhuiensis is a Chinese plant species in the lily family, native to Anhui Province in eastern China.
