= Giant lily =

Giant lily is a common name for several plants and may refer to:

- Victoria amazonica, a water lily native to the shallow waters of the Amazon River basin
- Cardiocrinum giganteum, a lily native to the Himalayas, China, and Myanmar
