= Amana kuocangshanica =

Scientific classification
- Kingdom: Plantae
- Clade: Tracheophytes
- Clade: Angiosperms
- Clade: Monocots
- Order: Liliales
- Family: Liliaceae
- Subfamily: Lilioideae
- Tribe: Lilieae
- Genus: Amana
- Species: A. kuocangshanica

Binomial name
- Amana kuocangshanica D.Y.Tan & D.Y.Hong

Species of flowering plant

Amana kuocangshanica is a Chinese plant species in the lily family, native to Zhejiang Province in eastern China.

Amana kuocangshanica grows in moist places, frequently in bamboo forests. It is a bulb-forming herb up to 20 cm tall. Flowers are white with a green or spot in the center plus purple veins along the outside.
