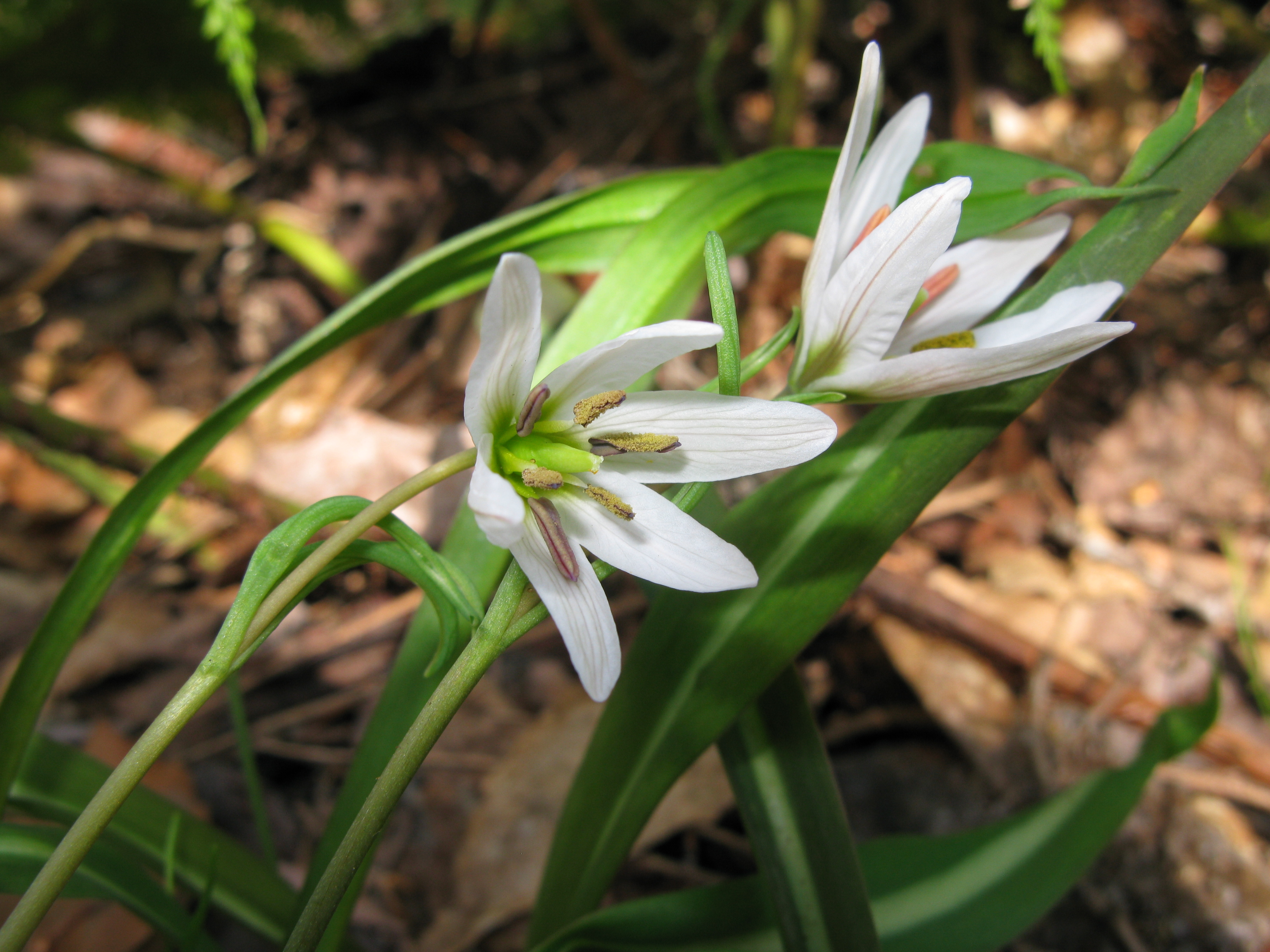

Scientific classification
- Kingdom: Plantae
- Clade: Tracheophytes
- Clade: Angiosperms
- Clade: Monocots
- Order: Liliales
- Family: Liliaceae
- Subfamily: Lilioideae
- Tribe: Lilieae
- Genus: Amana
- Species: A. erythronioides

Binomial name
- Amana erythronioides (Baker) D.Y.Tan & D.Y.Hong

Synonyms
- Tulipa erythronioides Baker; Tulipa edulis var. latifolia Makino; Tulipa latifolia (Makino) Makino; Amana latifolia (Makino) Honda

= Amana erythronioides =

Species of plant

Amana erythronioides (formerly Tulipa erythronioides) is an East Asian species of flowering plant in the lily family, native to China (Anhui, Zhejiang) and Japan (Musashi, Ise).

Amana erythronioides is a bulb-forming perennial up to 20 cm tall. Flowers are white with purple veins.
