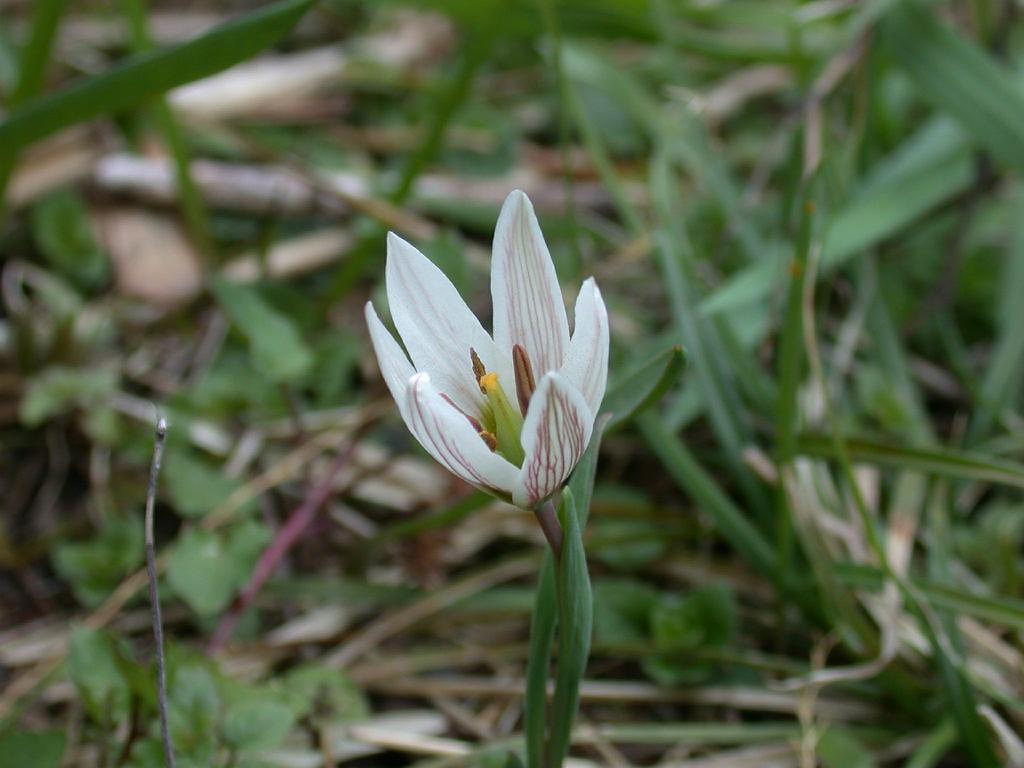

Scientific classification
- Kingdom: Plantae
- Clade: Tracheophytes
- Clade: Angiosperms
- Clade: Monocots
- Order: Liliales
- Family: Liliaceae
- Subfamily: Lilioideae
- Tribe: Lilieae
- Genus: Amana
- Species: A. edulis

Binomial name
- Amana edulis (Miq.) Honda

Synonyms
- Orithyia edulis Miq.; Tulipa edulis (Miq.) Baker; Ornithogalum edule Siebold; Orithyia oxypetala A.Gray 1856, illegitimate homonym not D. Don 1835; Tulipa graminifolia Baker; Gagea argyi H.Lév.; Gagea hypoxioides H.Lév.; Gagea coreana H.Lév.; Amana graminifolia (Baker) A.D.Hall

= Amana edulis =

Species of plant

Amana edulis (formerly Tulipa edulis) is a flowering bulb that is native to China, Japan, and Korea.

Amana edulis is a bulb-forming perennial up to 25 cm tall. The flowers are white, streaked with purplish-red. The bulbs are edible and in some cases have been used medicinally.
