= Royal tour of Nepal by Prince Waldemar of Prussia =

Prince Waldemar of Prussia (1817-1849) visited Nepal between 5 February to mid of March 1845. His diary was published in 1853 in Germany. His travel account consisted of description, drawings and maps and thus is considered significant to understand the society of that period.

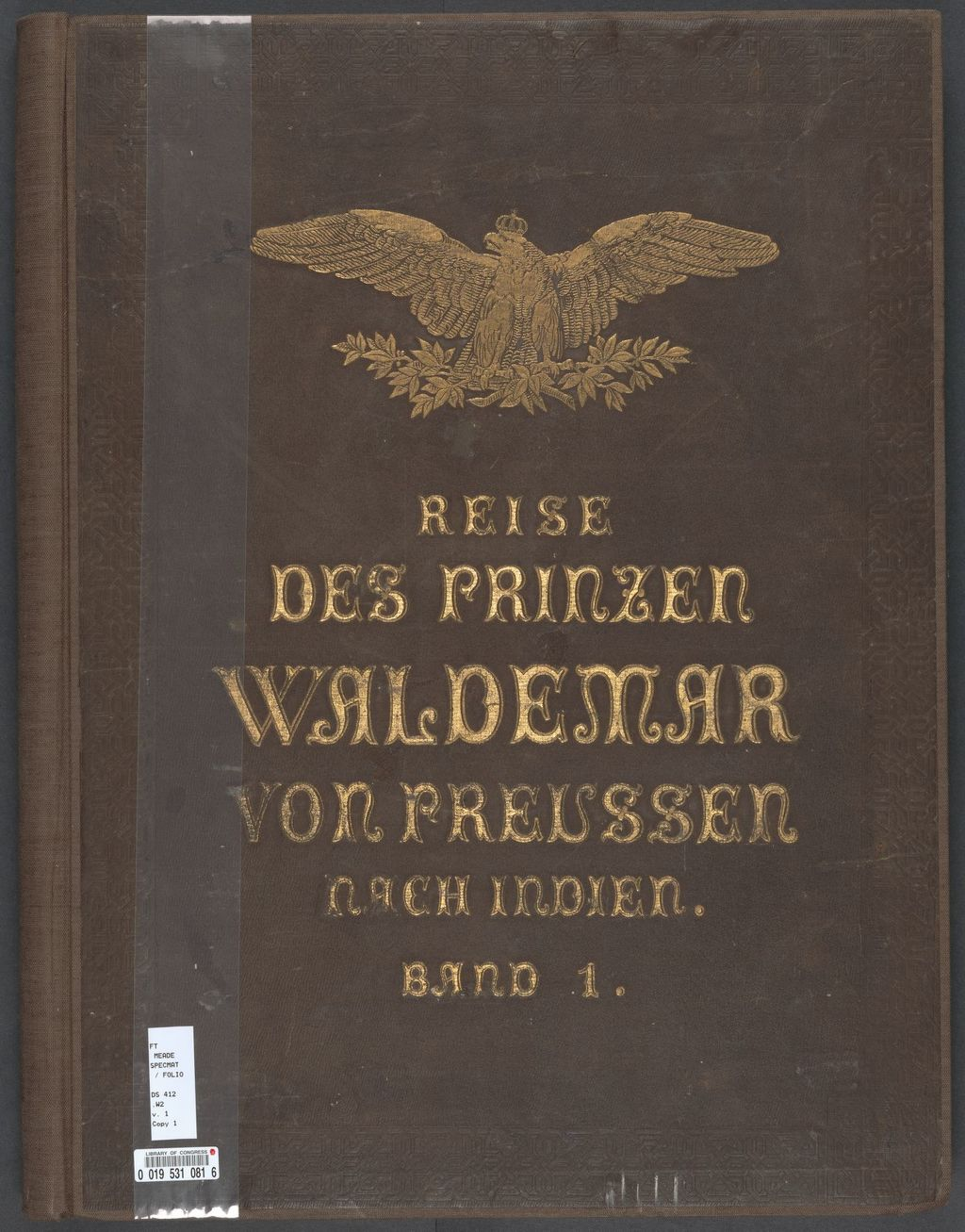
Cover of the travel diary of Prince Waldemar of Prussia in his travels through India and other lands.

== Travel to Kathmandu ==
The Prince came to Kathmandu via Birgunj, Bhimphedi, Chitlang and Chandragiri. His travel arrangements were made by British Major Lawrence. The travel was done in a caravan of elephants, ponies and number of hill palanquins. A group of Nepali soldiers also joined the group serving as a guard of honour.

In Hetauda Prince Waldemar tried to hunt rhino but was not successful. In Bhimphedi he was received by Dil Bikram Thapa, the nephew of the minister Mathbar Singh Thapa. They passed Lama Dangra range, Chitlang and finally stopping at Chandragiri. On the next day, they were received by Prime Minister Mathbar Singh Thapa.

== Time spent in Kathmandu valley ==
The Prince was impressed by the architecture of houses in Kathmandu and assumed it was due to the Chinese influence. He also described the temples and stone sculptures and courtyards (Bahals) in his journal and mentioned the cobbled streets and the gutters in Kathmandu was far better than what he saw in India. Prince Waldemar also visited Pashupatinath and Nagarjun.

In Lalitpur he noticed old houses, most of which was destroyed during Prithvi Narayan Shah’s invasion. When questioned why weren’t the houses repaired, he was told that "anyone who regards himself a man of distinction constructs their own house and let that of his father decay." Later, the Prince was taken to Swayambhunath. He also visited the barracks to see the kind of weapons manufactured in the Kingdom.

On 17 February, he visited Bhaktapur where he saw houses in a poor condition. He writes in his journal that "one of the main reasons for this was that the people here use a lot of wood when building their houses. People don’t seem to use plaster which is why the state of the houses was abysmal." But he liked Bhaktapur because there were a lot more temples and idols.

He was invited to witness a royal wedding where they displayed very good fireworks and a great procession went through the town with soldiers and marching bands. It was wedding of the King's daughter and the son of the King of Bardiya.

He also visited Kirtipur which he described as ".. a good place, a town on top of a hill perfect for defence in battles." He had heard stories about how the people of Kirtipur withstood the forces of Prithvi Narayan Shah for over a year and how to retaliate against that Prithvi Narayan Shah cut of the nose of everyone in the city and left it in ruins. "The people still had their nose, but the place was in ruins with tumbled down walls and a castle that was barely standing."

The Prince wanted to travel around the mountain passes at Chovar but was not permitted, however, he was allowed to reach up to Nuwakot.

== Return ==
On the return, Mathbar Singh Thapa bid him farewell at Chitlang. The prince left in the company of Major Lawrence and Dr. Christie. They left via Bhimphedi, Hetauda and Birgunj. In Birgunj, a tiger hunt was organised with 30 elephants carrying several Englishmen. He succeeded in shooting two tigers in eight days.

== Significance ==
The lithographs and description made by Waldemar has been an important account for rebuilding the historic sites of Kathmandu that were damaged during the Gorkha earthquake in 2015.
