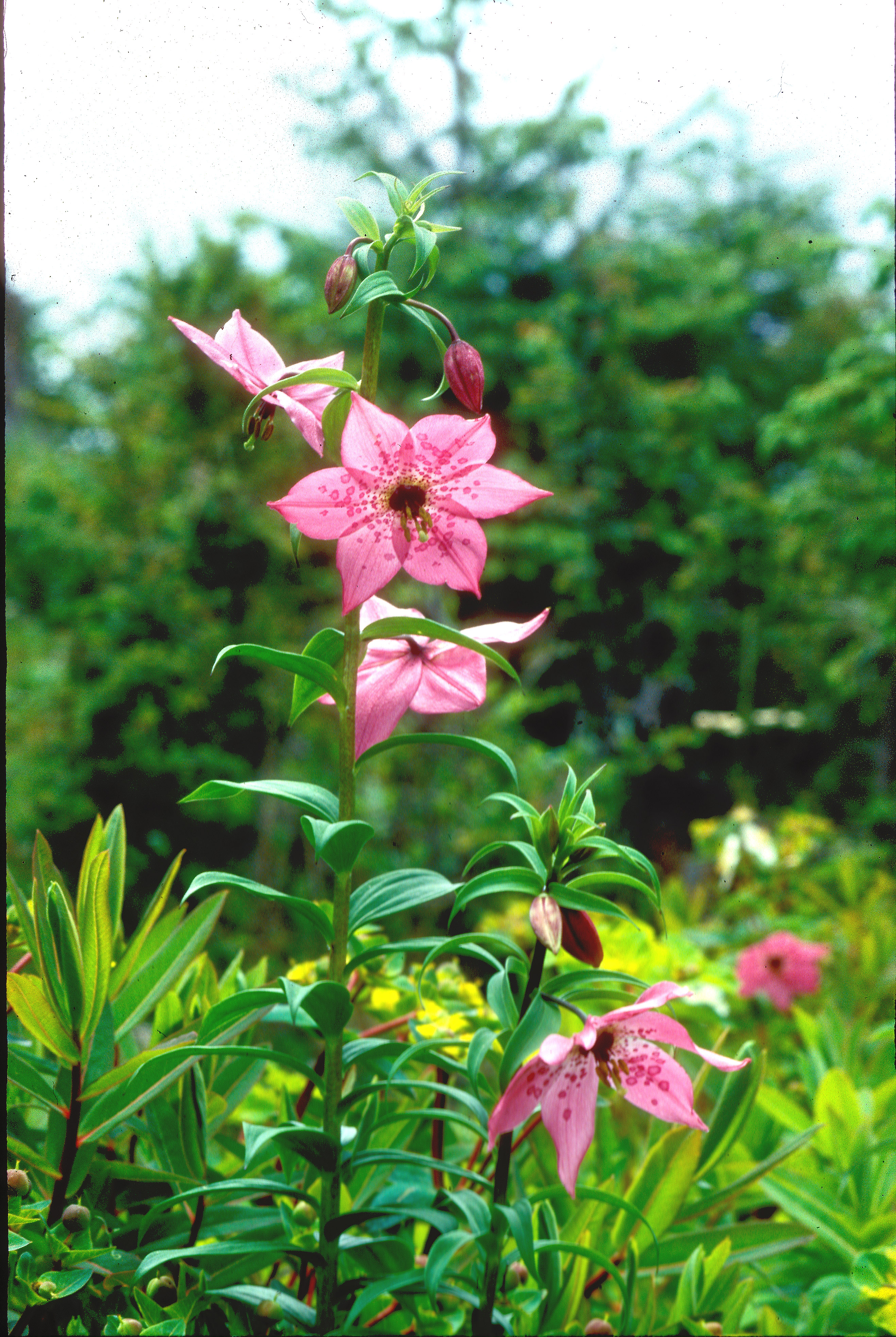
- Flowers of Lilium apertum

Scientific classification
- Kingdom: Plantae
- Clade: Tracheophytes
- Clade: Angiosperms
- Clade: Monocots
- Order: Liliales
- Family: Liliaceae
- Subfamily: Lilioideae
- Tribe: Lilieae
- Genus: Lilium
- Species: L. apertum

Binomial name
- Lilium apertum Franch., 1898

Synonyms
- Nomocharis aperta (Franch.) W.W.Sm. & W.E.Evans (1924); Nomocharis forrestii Balf.f. (1918)

= Lilium apertum =

East Asian species of lily

Lilium apertum is an Asian species of flowering plant in the lily family. It is found in the mountains of southwestern China (Tibet, Yunnan, Sichuan) and Myanmar.

== Description ==
Lilium apertum is a perennial, herbaceous plant reaching heights of between 25 and 50 centimeters. Flowers are rose-colored.
