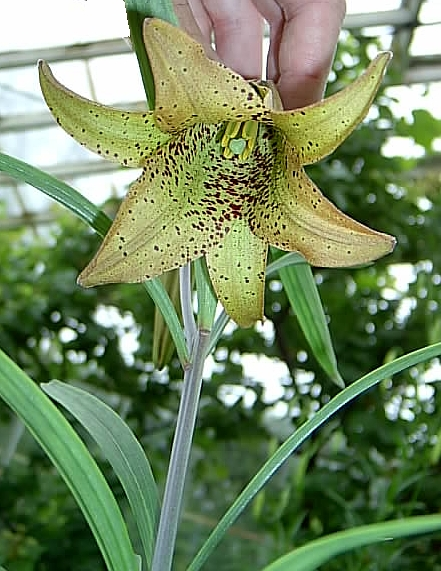

Scientific classification
- Kingdom: Plantae
- Clade: Tracheophytes
- Clade: Angiosperms
- Clade: Monocots
- Order: Liliales
- Family: Liliaceae
- Subfamily: Lilioideae
- Tribe: Lilieae
- Genus: Lilium
- Species: L. bakerianum

Binomial name
- Lilium bakerianum Collett & Hemsl.

= Lilium bakerianum =

Species of plant

Lilium bakerianum is a species of flowering plant in the family Liliaceae. It was described by Henry Collett and William Hemsley. The species is named in honor of botanist John Gilbert Baker.

== Subspecies ==
The species is divided into the following subspecies:

- Lilium bakerianum subsp. aureum
- Lilium bakerianum subsp. bakerianum
- Lilium bakerianum subsp. delavayi
- Lilium bakerianum subsp. rubrum
- Lilium bakerianum subsp. yunnanense
