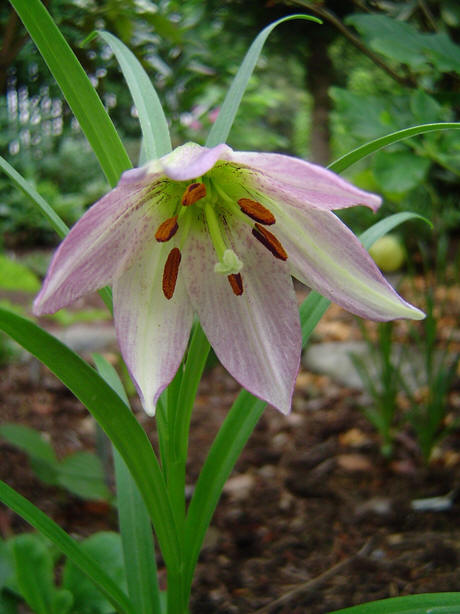

Scientific classification
- Kingdom: Plantae
- Clade: Tracheophytes
- Clade: Angiosperms
- Clade: Monocots
- Order: Liliales
- Family: Liliaceae
- Subfamily: Lilioideae
- Tribe: Lilieae
- Genus: Lilium
- Species: L. oxypetalum

Binomial name
- Lilium oxypetalum (D.Don) Baker

Synonyms
- Lilium triceps Klotzsch; Nomocharis oxypetala (D.Don) E.H.Wilson

= Lilium oxypetalum =

Species of plant

Lilium oxypetalum is a small to medium member of the Liliaceae family which grows to a height of 20–30 cm. It is native to the N. W. Himalayas. It grows as a single stem from a bulb, preferring a cool, shady position in moist, acid soil. The green stem is tinged with purple and supports a scattering of linear to lanceolate leaves, sometimes in a whorl beneath the flowers. The leaves are up to 7 cm long. The yellow, semi-pendant, unscented flowers are produced in early summer in ones or twos on slender stems. The flowers are shaped like a shallow bowl, up to 5 cm across and have a scattering of purple spots near the centre.

Oxypetalum (oxee`pet`alum) means sharp petalled.

The variety insigne produces purple flowers.
