= Werner Hoffmeister =

German physician and botanist (1819–1845)

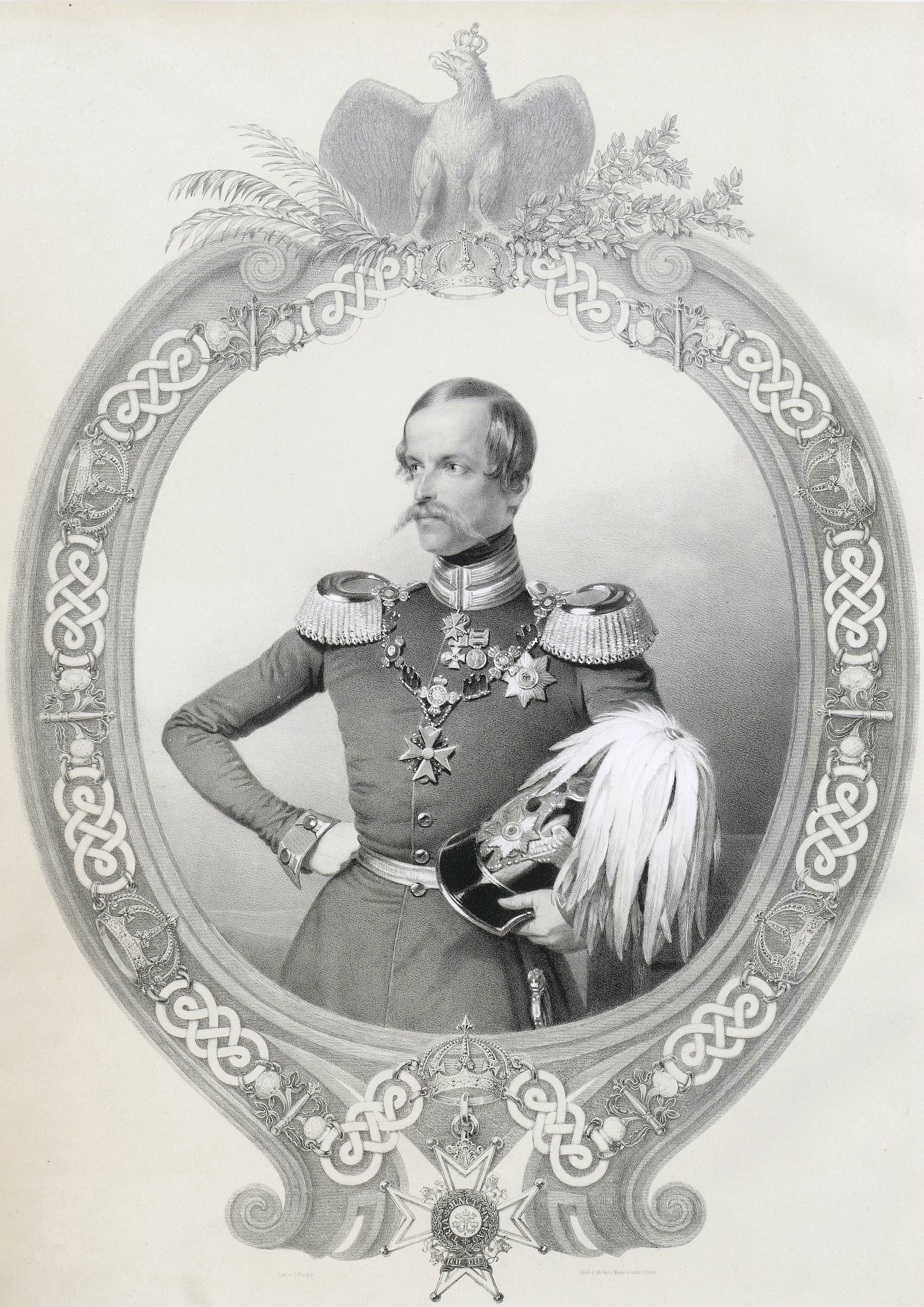
Prince Friedrich Wilhelm Waldemar of Prussia (1817-1849) Childhood friend of Werner Hoffmeister and sponsor of the 1845-46 expedition to India

Werner Friedrich Hoffmeister (14 March 1819 Braunschweig – 21. December 1845 Ferozeshah, Punjab) was a German medical doctor and botanist. He accompanied his childhood friend, Prince Friedrich Wilhelm Waldemar of Prussia, (2 August 1817 – 17 February 1849), son of Prince Wilhelm of Prussia (1783–1851), as a personal physician on an expedition 1845-46 to India and was fatally hit by a bullet in a skirmish with the Sikhs.

Hoffmeister collected plants during the voyage, and when the expedition returned it did so with a comprehensive collection of meticulously pressed and annotated specimens, by Hoffmeister. Of the 456 species and 270 genera, some 108 were new to science. The botanists Johann Friedrich Klotzsch and Christian August Friedrich Garcke were assigned to examine and describe the material collected in India, a task which they completed in 1853, and published in 2 volumes in Berlin as Die Botanischen Ergebnisse der Reise seiner königl. Hoheit des Prinzen Waldemar von Preussen in den Jahren 1845 und 1846.

Hoffmeister lived in Braunschweig until 1827, his father being the pastor at St. Petri, and then in Wolfenbüttel, when his father was appointed to the consistory council there. His interest in natural history dated back to his youth with frequent visits to the Harz Mountains and, after preparatory studies at the Collegium Carolinum in Braunschweig, and from 1839 medical studies in Berlin.

After losing both parents, he was greatly influenced by his uncle, Martin Hinrich Lichtenstein. He continued his studies in Bonn and went on trips to the Rhine Valley, the Netherlands, southern France and Switzerland. In 1841 he was back in Berlin, and received his doctorate in medicine in 1843. He then went to London and Paris, searching for a position as doctor. On the recommendation of Humboldt, Hinrich Lichtenstein and Johann Lukas Schönlein, he became personal physician to Prince Waldemar of Prussia on his journey to India, which began in 1844, and about which he wrote a travelogue and on which he collected plants.
