= Prince Waldemar of Prussia (1817–1849) =

German royal and army officer (1817–1849)

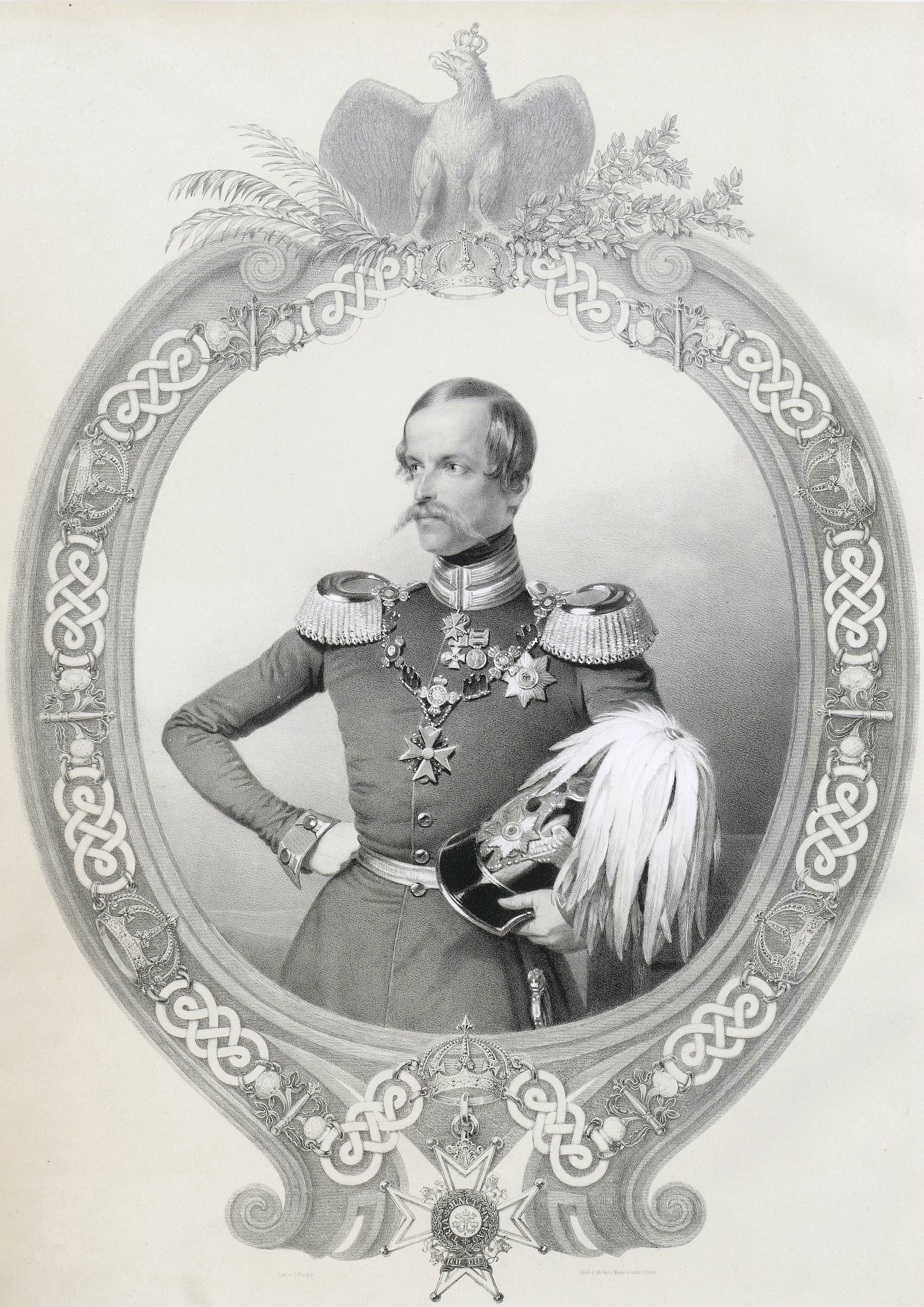
- Born: 2 August 1817; Berlin, Prussia
- Died: 17 February 1849 (aged 31); Münster, Prussia
Names
- English: Frederick William Waldemar; German: Friedrich Wilhelm Waldemar
- House: Hohenzollern
- Father: Prince Wilhelm of Prussia
- Mother: Landgravine Marie Anna of Hesse-Homburg

Prince Waldemar of Prussia (Friedrich Wilhelm Waldemar von Preußen) (Berlin, 2 August 1817 – Münster, 17 February 1849) was the son of Prince Wilhelm of Prussia and Landgravine Marie Anna of Hesse-Homburg. He was a Major general in the Prussian Army and a traveller.

== Biography ==
Waldemar was born in Berlin, the son of Prince William, the youngest brother of King Frederick William III. Of his 4 brothers, only Prince Adalbert survived his childhood. His youngest sister Marie was Queen of Bavaria.

As a young man, Waldemar entered the Prussian army and raised through the ranks to become a Colonel in 1844.

His urge to see distant lands led him to the Mediterranean, to South America and in 1844 to India, where he traveled to the Himalayas via Calcutta and Hindustan. His journey came to an end with the First Anglo-Sikh War. He witnessed the first day of the Battle of Ferozeshah (21/22 December 1845), but when his companion, childhood friend and German physician and botanist Werner Hoffmeister was fatally hit by a bullet, British commander Hugh Gough urged Prince Waldemar to return home.

Back in Germany he became commander of the 13th Cavalry Brigade in Münster on 9 March 1848. But weakened by the hardships of the journey and the Indian climate, he died there on 17 February 1849.

Prince Waldemar maintained a travelogue during his journeys composed of his diaries, sketches of Egypt, Iraq, India, Calcutta, Delhi, Lahore, Bombay, Nepal, and other locations. Zur Erinnerung an die Reise des Prinzen Waldemar von Preußen nach Indien 1844-1846, translated In Memory of the Journey of Prince Waldemar of Prussia to India in the Years 1844-1846, was printed posthumously in two volumes. Prince Waldemar’s diary depicts sacred places, people, and painted lithographs of the sketches. Pastoral Landscapes of the Middle Eastern, Indian, and South Asian countryside, such as the Sri Dalada Maligawa, Temple of the Tooth.

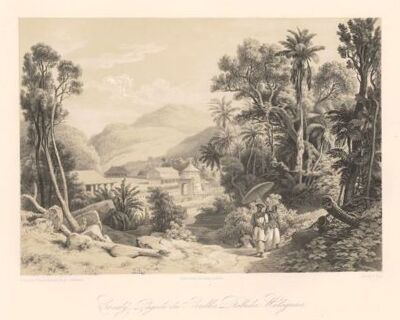
A lithograph from the Travel Diary of Prince Waldemar of Prussia depicting Sri Dalada Maligawa in Sri Lanka

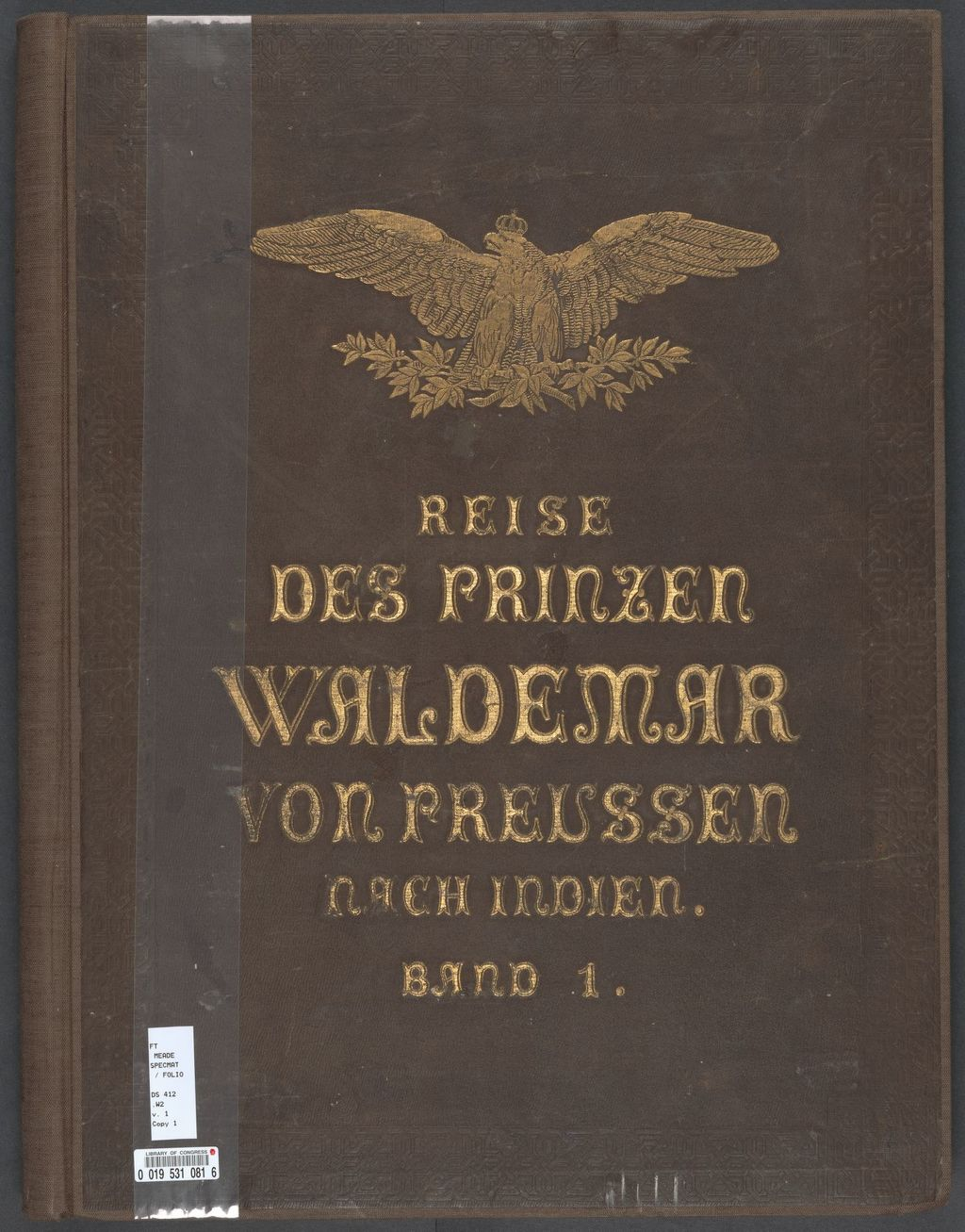
Cover of the travel diary of Prince Waldemar of Prussia in his travels through India and other lands.

Published works of the expedition included writings and sketches of Werner Hoffmeister and others as well, additional record of the journey can be found in Briefe aus Indien. Von Dr. W. Hoffmeister, Arzt im Gefolge Sr. Königl, Hoheit des Prinzen Waldemar von Preußen

== Honours ==
He received the following orders and decorations:

- Kingdom of Prussia:
  - Knight of the Black Eagle, 2 August 1827; with Collar, 1835
  - Pour le Mérite (military), 18 December 1846
- Kingdom of Hanover: Grand Cross of the Royal Guelphic Order, 1843
- Electorate of Hesse: Grand Cross of the Golden Lion
- Hohenzollern: Cross of Honour of the Princely House Order of Hohenzollern, 1st Class
- Russian Empire: Knight of St. Andrew
- United Kingdom: Honorary Grand Cross of the Bath (military), 10 November 1846

== Ancestry ==
Ancestors of Prince Waldemar of Prussia (1817–1849)

16. Frederick William I of Prussia
8. Prince Augustus William of Prussia
17. Princess Sophia Dorothea of Hanover
4. Frederick William II of Prussia
18. Ferdinand Albert II, Duke of Brunswick-Lüneburg
9. Duchess Louise Amalie of Brunswick-Wolfenbüttel
19. Princess Antoinette of Brunswick-Lüneburg
2. Prince William of Prussia
20. Louis VIII, Landgrave of Hesse-Darmstadt
10. Louis IX, Landgrave of Hesse-Darmstadt
21. Countess Charlotte of Hanau-Lichtenberg-Müntzenberg
5. Princess Frederika Louisa of Hesse-Darmstadt
22. Christian III, Count Palatine of Zweibrücken
11. Countess Palatine Caroline of Zweibrücken
23. Countess Caroline of Nassau-Saarbrücken
1. Prince Waldemar of Prussia
24. Landgrave Kasimir of Hesse-Homburg
12. Frederick IV, Landgrave of Hesse-Homburg
25. Countess Christine of Solms-Braunfels
6. Frederick V, Landgrave of Hesse-Homburg
26. Frederick William I, Prince of Solms-Braunfels
13. Princess Ulrica of Solms-Braunfels
27. Countess Sophia of Solms-Utphe-Laubach
3. Landgravine Marie Anna of Hesse-Homburg
28. Louis VIII, Landgrave of Hesse-Darmstadt (= 20)
14. Louis IX, Landgrave of Hesse-Darmstadt (= 10)
29. Countess Charlotte of Hanau-Lichtenberg-Müntzenberg (= 21)
7. Princess Caroline of Hesse-Darmstadt
30. Christian III, Count Palatine of Zweibrücken (= 22)
15. Countess Palatine Caroline of Zweibrücken (= 11)
31. Countess Caroline of Nassau-Saarbrücken (= 23)

== Sources ==
- ADB
- Waldemarstraße
