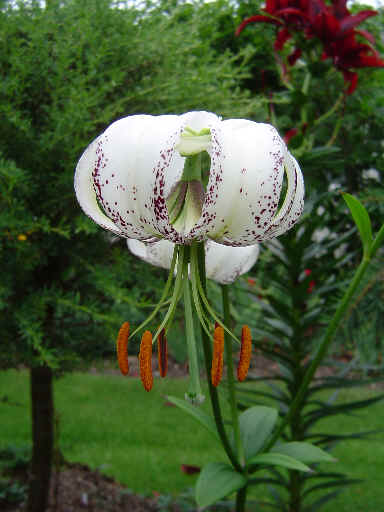
- Flower
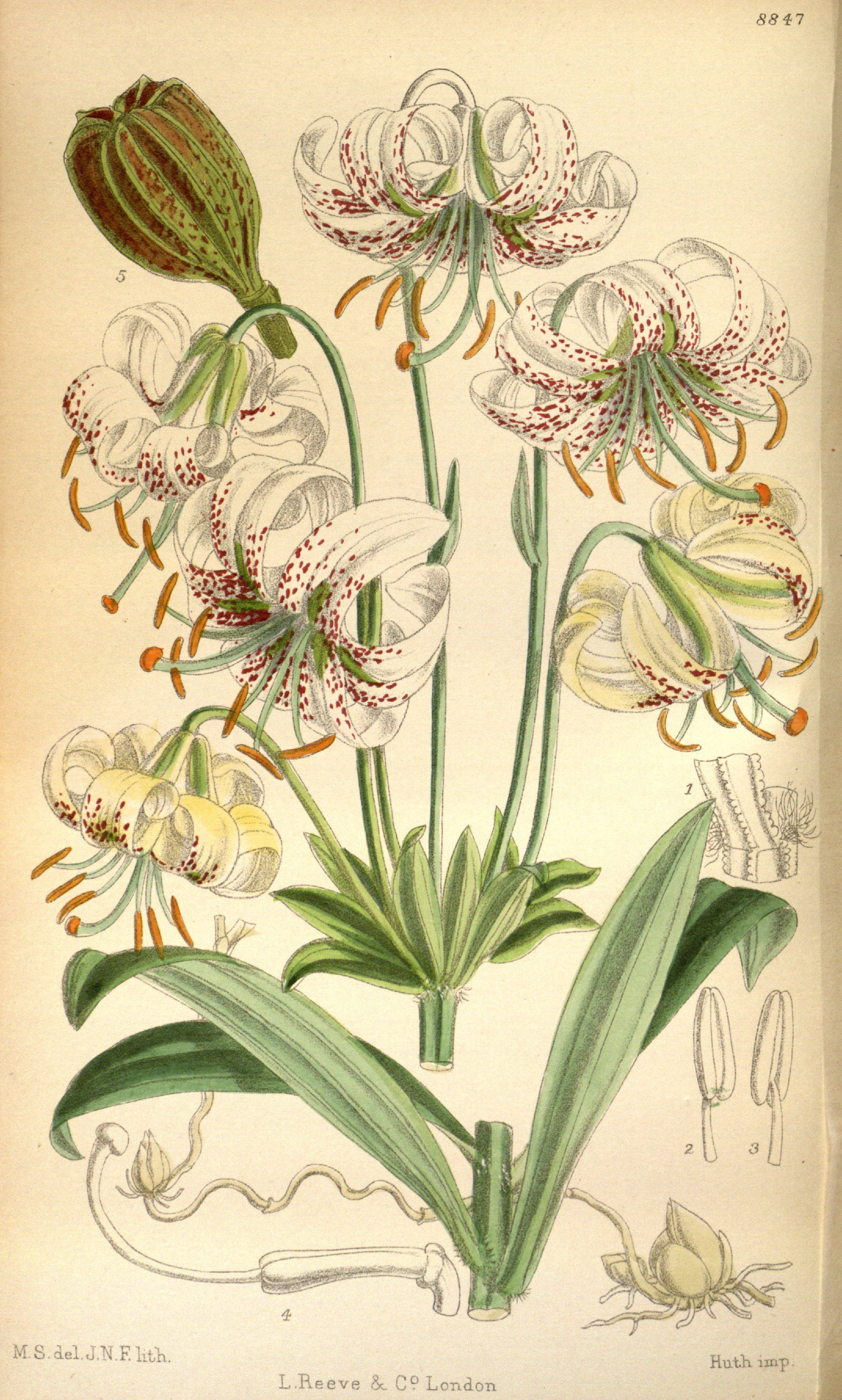
- Botanical illustration

Scientific classification
- Kingdom: Plantae
- Clade: Embryophytes
- Clade: Tracheophytes
- Clade: Spermatophytes
- Clade: Angiosperms
- Clade: Monocots
- Order: Liliales
- Family: Liliaceae
- Subfamily: Lilioideae
- Genus: Lilium
- Species: L. duchartrei

Binomial name
- Lilium duchartrei Franch.

Synonyms
- Lilium duchartrei var. farreri (Turrill) K.Krause; Lilium farreri Turrill; Lilium forrestii W.W.Sm.; Lilium moupinense Franch.

= Lilium duchartrei =

Species of plant

Lilium duchartrei, the marble martagon lily, is a species of flowering plant in the family Liliaceae. It is native to the eastern Himalayas and central China. A bulbous geophyte reaching 0.5 to 1.5 m (2 to 5 ft), it is typically found in forest edges at elevations from 1,500 to 3,800 m (4,900 to 12,500 ft). Occasionally available from commercial suppliers, it is hardy to USDA zone 4.
