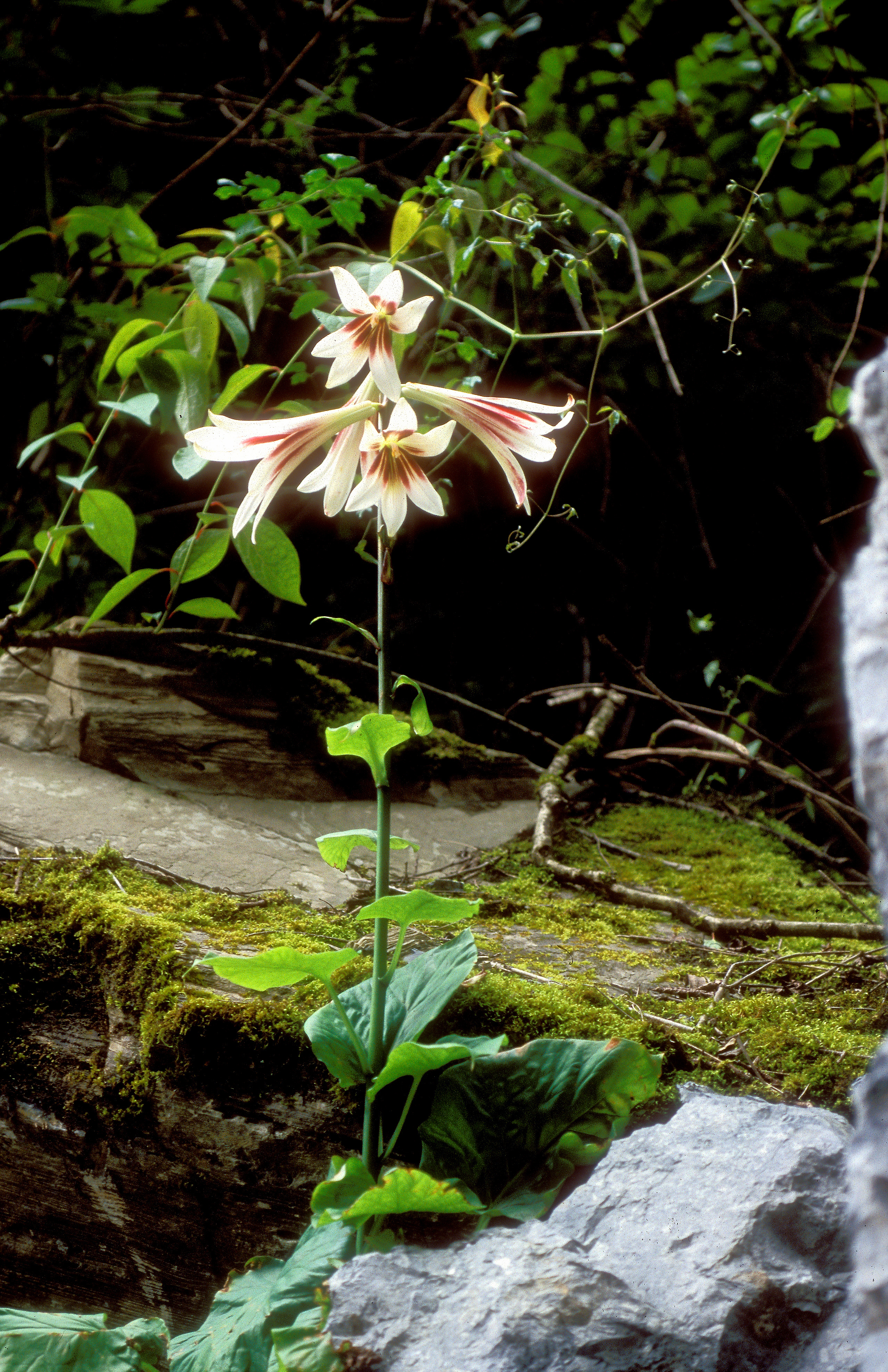
- Cardiocrinum giganteum

Scientific classification
- Kingdom: Plantae
- Clade: Tracheophytes
- Clade: Angiosperms
- Clade: Monocots
- Order: Liliales
- Family: Liliaceae
- Subfamily: Lilioideae
- Tribe: Lilieae
- Genus: Cardiocrinum (Endl.) Lindl.

Type species
- Cardiocrinum cathayanum

Synonyms
- Lilium unranked Cardiocrinum Endl.

= Cardiocrinum =

Genus of flowering plants

Cardiocrinum is a genus of bulbous plants of the lily family first described in 1846. They are native to the Himalaya, China, the Russian Far East, and Japan. The bulbs are usually formed at the soil surface. The preferred habitat is woodland. The plants tend to be monocarpic, dying after flowering.

== Description ==
Cardiocrinum is a genus of monocarpic perennial herbs.

== Taxonomy ==
Cardiocrinum was originally described by Endlicher in 1836 as one of five sections of Lilium, to which it is closely related. Later authors considered it a separate genus. The common name is giant lilies. They differ from Lilium in some characteristics, most notably in the heart shaped leaves. The genus name alludes to these leaves, from the Greek kardia, heart, and krinon, lily.

The Himalayan species Cardiocrinum giganteum is the largest of any of the lily plants, growing up to 3.5 metres high.

=== Species ===
The genus Cardiocrinum is endemic to East Asia and has three species, two of which occur in China.

Image	Scientific name	Distribution
	Cardiocrinum cathayanum (E.H.Wilson) Stearn	E + C China
	Cardiocrinum cordatum (Thunb.) Makino	Japan, Kuril Islands, Sakhalin
	Cardiocrinum giganteum (Wall.) Makino	Gansu, Guangdong, Guangxi, Guizhou, Henan, Hubei, Hunan, Shaanxi, Sichuan, Tibet, Yunnan, Bhutan, Assam, Myanmar, Nepal, Sikkim

== Bibliography ==
=== Books ===
- Bolt, Philip (2018). The Genus Cardiocrinum: its identification and cultivation (PDF). Redhall Garden.
- Endlicher, Stephanus (1836). "Lilium (Cardiocrinum)". Genera plantarum secundum ordines naturales disposita (in Latin). Vienna: Fredericum Beck. p. 141.

=== Articles ===
- Chen, Hong-Na; Zhao, Chun-Hai; Liu, Xiao-Rui; Liu, Jia-Xi (16 June 2012). "Pollen development of Cardiocrinum giganteum (Wall.) Makina in China". Plant Systematics and Evolution. 298 (8): 1557–1565. Bibcode:2012PSyEv.298.1557C. doi:10.1007/s00606-012-0658-9. JSTOR 43558355. S2CID 13347067.
- Hyam, R. & Pankhurst, R.J. (1995). Plants and their names: a concise dictionary. Oxford: Oxford University Press. p. 89. ISBN 978-0-19-866189-4.
- Lu, Rui-Sen; Li, Pan; Qiu, Ying-Xiong (10 January 2017). "The Complete Chloroplast Genomes of Three Cardiocrinum (Liliaceae) Species: Comparative Genomic and Phylogenetic Analyses". Frontiers in Plant Science. 7: 2054. doi:10.3389/fpls.2016.02054. PMC 5222849. PMID 28119727.
- Ohara, Masashi; Narumi, Tadashi; Yoshizane, Tomoko; Okayasu, Tarou; Masuda, Junzo; Kawano, Shoichi (December 2006). "7: Cardiocrinum cordatum (Thunb.) Makino (Liliaceae)". Plant Species Biology. 21 (3): 201–207. doi:10.1111/j.1442-1984.2006.00166.x.
- Pelkonen, Veli-Pekka; Pirttilä, Anna-Maria (2012). "Taxonomy and Phylogeny of the Genus Lilium" (PDF). Floriculture and Ornamental Biotechnology. 6 (Special Issue 2): 1–8.
- Yang, Li-Qin; Hu, Hao-Yu; Xie, Chuan; Lai, Shan-Pan; Yang, Mei; He, Xing-Jin; Zhou, Song-Dong (January 2017). "Molecular phylogeny, biogeography and ecological niche modelling of Cardiocrinum(Liliaceae): insights into the evolutionary history of endemic genera distributed across the Sino-Japanese floristic region". Annals of Botany. 119 (1): 59–72. doi:10.1093/aob/mcw210. PMC 5218382. PMID 27941092.

=== Websites ===
- "Lilium unranked Cardiocrinum Endl.". Tropicos. Missouri Botanical Garden. 2019.
- "Cardiocrinum (Endl.) Lindl". eMonocot. 2014.
- "Cardiocrinum". Encyclopedia of Life.
- WCSP. "Cardiocrinum (Endl.) Lindl., Veg. Kingd., ed. 2: 205 (1847)". World Checklist of Selected Plant Families (WCSP). Royal Botanic Gardens, Kew.
- IPNI (2005). "Cardiocrinum". International Plant Names Index. Royal Botanic Gardens, Kew.
