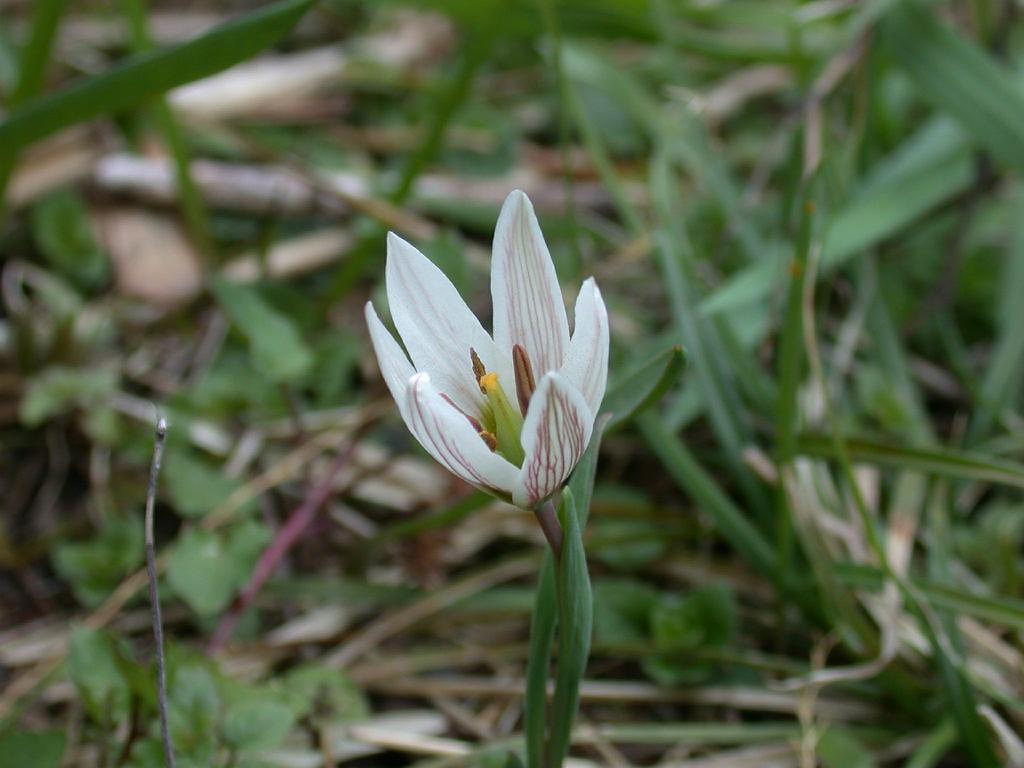
- Amana edulis

Scientific classification
- Kingdom: Plantae
- Clade: Tracheophytes
- Clade: Angiosperms
- Clade: Monocots
- Order: Liliales
- Family: Liliaceae
- Subfamily: Lilioideae
- Tribe: Lilieae
- Genus: Amana; Honda

Type species
- Amana edulis

= Amana (plant) =

Species of plant

Amana is a small genus of flowering bulbs in the lily family, closely related to Erythronium and Tulipa, with some (but not all) genetic data suggesting it may be embedded within Erythronium. Amana is found in China, Japan and Korea. As of April 2026 the Plants of the World Online database accepts 13 species, three of which were formerly placed in the genus Tulipa:

Image	Scientific name	Distribution
	Amana anhuiensis (X.S.Shen) Christenh., syn. Tulipa anhuiensis X.S.Shen	China (Anhui)
	Amana baohuaensis B.X.Han, Long Wang & G.Y.Lu	China (Jiangsu)
	Amana edulis (Miq.) Honda, syn. Tulipa edulis (Miq.) Baker	China, Japan, and Korea
	Amana erythronioides (Baker) D.Y.Tan & D.Y.Hong, syn. Tulipa erythronioides Baker	China (Anhui, Zhejiang) and Japan (Musashi, Ise, Mie).
	Amana hejiaqingii M.Zhen Wang & P.Li	China
	Amana kuocangshanica D.Y.Tan & D.Y.Hong	China (Zhejiang)
	Amana nanyueensis P.Li & L.X.Liu	China
	Amana polymorpha M.Zhen Wang & P.Li	China
	Amana tianmuensis P.Li & M.Zhen Wang	China
	Amana wanyuensis B.X.Han, S.Y.Yi & X.W.Song	China
	Amana wanzhensis Lu Q.Huang, B.X.Han & K.Zhang	China (Anhui)
	Amana yunjuensis B.X.Han & X.W.Song	China
	Amana yunmengensis P.Li, M.Zhen Wang & Zi Yi Wang	China

== Bibliography ==
- Li, Pan; Lu, Rui-Sen; Xu, Wu-Qin; Ohi-Toma, Tetsuo; Cai, Min-Qi; Qiu, Ying-Xiong; Cameron, Kenneth M.; Fu, Cheng-Xin (4 April 2017), "Comparative Genomics and Phylogenomics of East Asian Tulips (Amana, Liliaceae)", Frontiers in Plant Science, 8: 451, doi:10.3389/fpls.2017.00451, PMC 5378804, PMID 28421090
- Tan, Dun-Yan; Zhang, Zhen; Li, Xin-Rong; Hong De-Yuan, De-Yuan (2005), "Restoration of the genus Amana Honda (Liliaceae) based on a cladistic analysis of morphological characters", Acta Phytotaxonomica Sinica (in Chinese), 43 (3): 262–270, doi:10.1360/aps040106 (inactive 11 July 2025)
