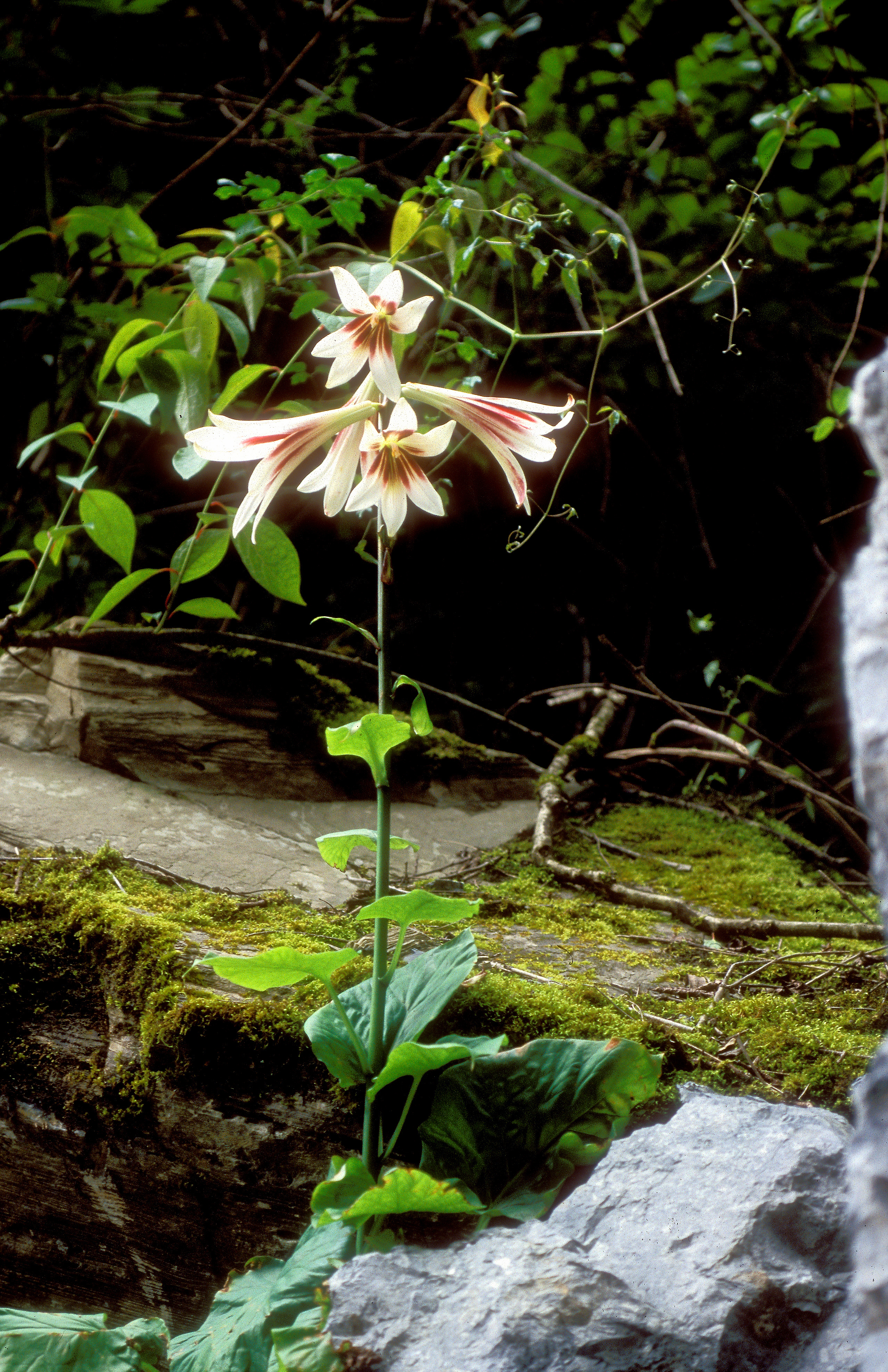

Scientific classification
- Kingdom: Plantae
- Clade: Tracheophytes
- Clade: Angiosperms
- Clade: Monocots
- Order: Liliales
- Family: Liliaceae
- Subfamily: Lilioideae
- Genus: Cardiocrinum
- Species: C. giganteum

Binomial name
- Cardiocrinum giganteum (Wall.) Makino

Synonyms
- Cardiocrinum mirabile (Franch.) Makino; Lilium cordifolium subsp. giganteum (Wall.) Baker; Lilium giganteum Wallich; Lilium mirabile Franch.

= Cardiocrinum giganteum =

Giant Himalayan lily

Species of flowering plant

Cardiocrinum giganteum, the giant Himalayan lily, is the largest species of any of the lily plants, growing up to 3.5 metres high. It is found in the Himalayas, China and Myanmar (Burma).

== Varieties ==
Two varieties are recognized

- C. giganteum var. giganteum - up to 3 metres tall, the outer part of the flower greenish and the inside streaked with purple - Kashmir, Tibet, Bhutan, Assam, Myanmar, Nepal, Sikkim
- C. giganteum var. yunnanense - 1–2 metres tall, the outer part of the flower white and the inside streaked with purplish red - Myanmar, Gansu, Guangdong, Guangxi, Guizhou, Henan, Hubei, Hunan, Shaanxi, Sichuan, Yunnan

== Description ==
Cardiocrinum giganteum is a bulbous perennial. Flowers are white, fragrant, shaped like a trumpet, and 8 in (20 cm) long. Petals have purple streaking and a greenish tinge on the outside. Leaves are medium to dark green, broad-ovate in shape, and 12–15 in (30–38 cm) long. Giganteum means unusually large or tall. It grows in woodland clearings.

== History of cultivation ==
The plant was first described scientifically in 1824 by Nathaniel Wallich. The species was introduced into commercial production (as Lilium giganteum) in Britain in the 1850s. A bulb grown from seed collected by Major Madden flowered in Edinburgh in July 1852, while those collected by Thomas Lobb were first exhibited in flower in May 1853.

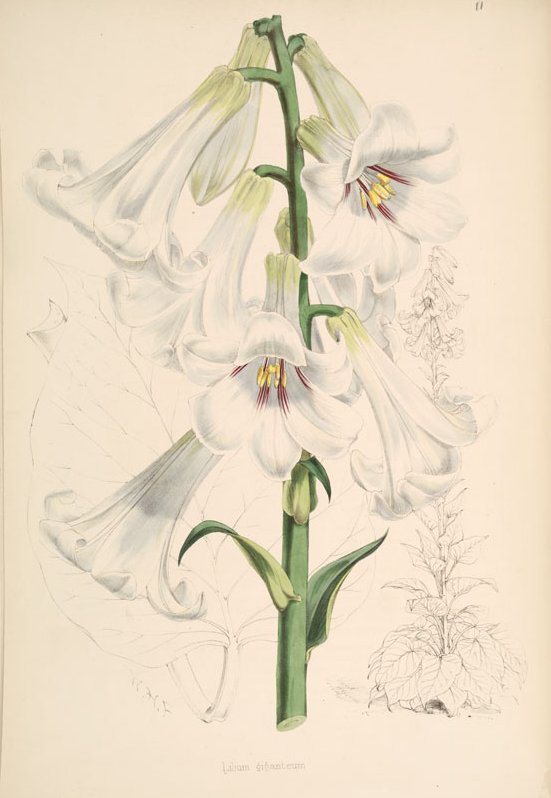
1880 illustration

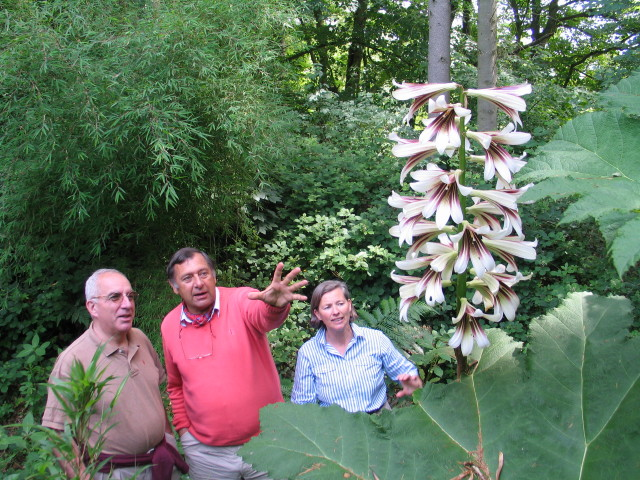
A plant of C. giganteum var. yunnanense growing at Jardin Jungle Karlostachys in France

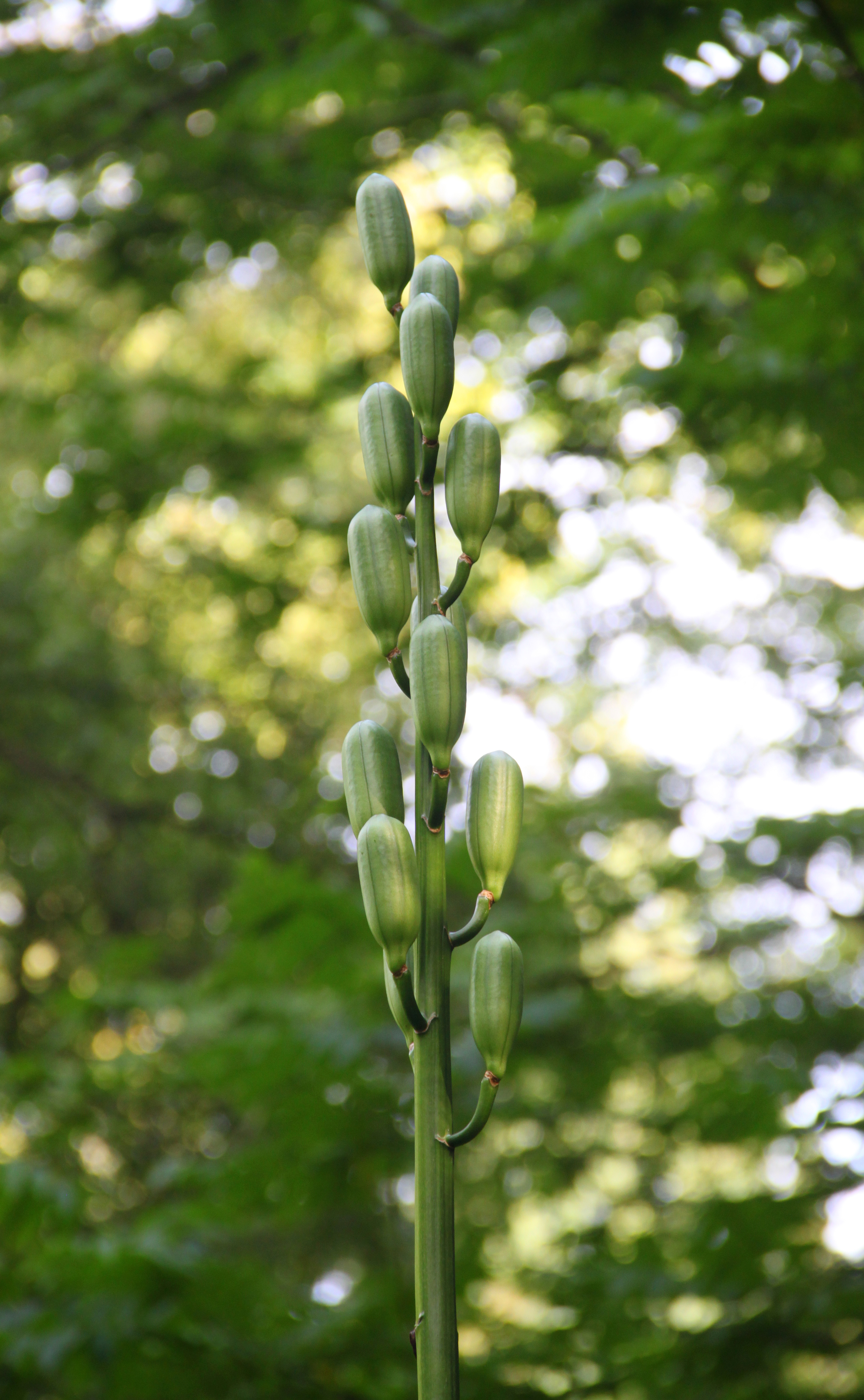
Fruits
