= Nomocharis =

Defunct genus of flowering plants

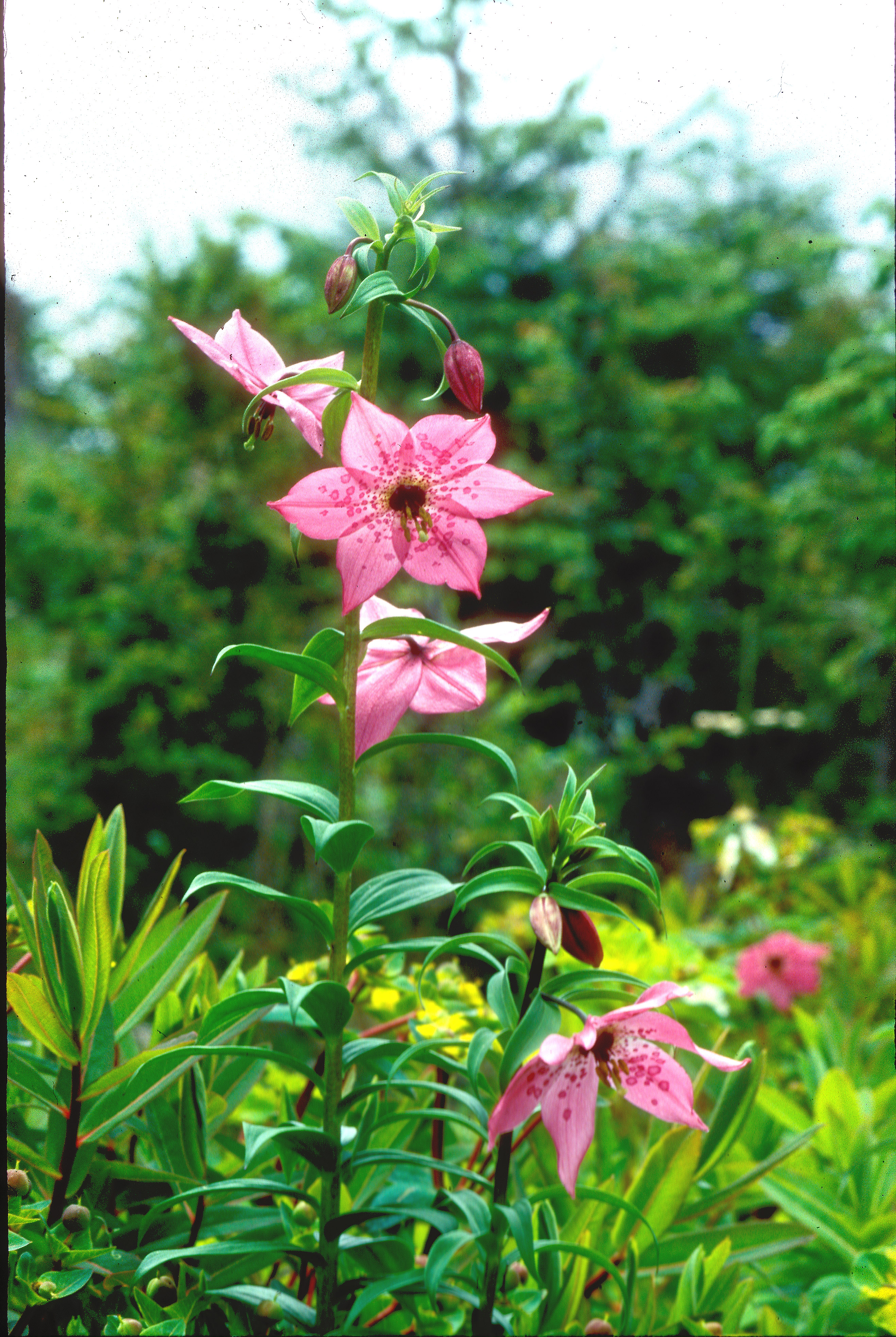
Lilium apertum, formerly Nomocharis aperta

Nomocharis was a genus of flowering plants in the family Liliaceae. It consisted of about 7 species native to montane regions of western China, Myanmar, and northern India. They are similar to Lilium, with one of the more obvious differences being the flowers being more shallow or sometimes flat.

== Taxonomy ==
As of October 2024 it is listed as a synonym of Lilium by Plants of the World Online, World Flora Online, and World Plants. In the early 2000s some authorities were treating Nomocharis as a group embedded within Lilium, rather than as a separate genus. Similarly in 2021 the United States Department of Agriculture and the Agricultural Research Service listed it as "Usually considered a synonym of Lilium."

== Species ==
The 10 species formerly placed in this genus by the World Checklist of Selected Plant Families in 2014 were:

- Nomocharis aperta (Franch.) W.W.Sm. & W.E.Evans
- Nomocharis basilissa Farrer ex W.E.Evans
- Nomocharis farreri (W.E.Evans) Cox
- Nomocharis georgei W.E.Evans
- Nomocharis gongshanensis Y.D.Gao & X.J.He
- Nomocharis meleagrina Franch.
- Nomocharis oxypetala (D.Don) E.H.Wilson
- Nomocharis pardanthina Franch.
- Nomocharis saluenensis Balf.f.
- Nomocharis synaptica Sealy

== Bibliography ==
- Gao, Yun-Dong; Hohenegger, Markus; Harris, AJ; Zhou, Song-Dong; He, Xing-Jin; Wan, Juan (2012). "A new species in the genus Nomocharis Franchet (Liliaceae): evidence that brings the genus Nomocharis into Lilium". Plant Systematics and Evolution. 298 (1): 69–85. Bibcode:2012PSyEv.298...69G. doi:10.1007/s00606-011-0524-1. ISSN 0378-2697. S2CID 16912824.
- Hassler, Michael (9 October 2024). "Synonymic Checklist and Distribution of the World Flora. Version 24.10". World Plants.
- Rønsted, N.; Law, S.; Thornton, H.; Fay, M. F.; Chase, M. W. (2005). "Molecular phylogenetic evidence for the monophyly of Fritillaria and Lilium (Liliaceae; Liliales) and the infrageneric classification of Fritillaria". Molecular Phylogenetics and Evolution. 35 (3): 509–527. Bibcode:2005MolPE..35..509R. doi:10.1016/j.ympev.2004.12.023. PMID 15878122.
- "Genus Nomocharis Franch". GRIN-Global. "Possible synonym of Lilium L."
- "Nomocharis Franch". Plants of the World Online. Royal Botanic Gardens, Kew.
- "Nomocharis", World Checklist of Selected Plant Families, Royal Botanic Gardens, Kew
- "Nomocharis Franch". World Flora Online.
