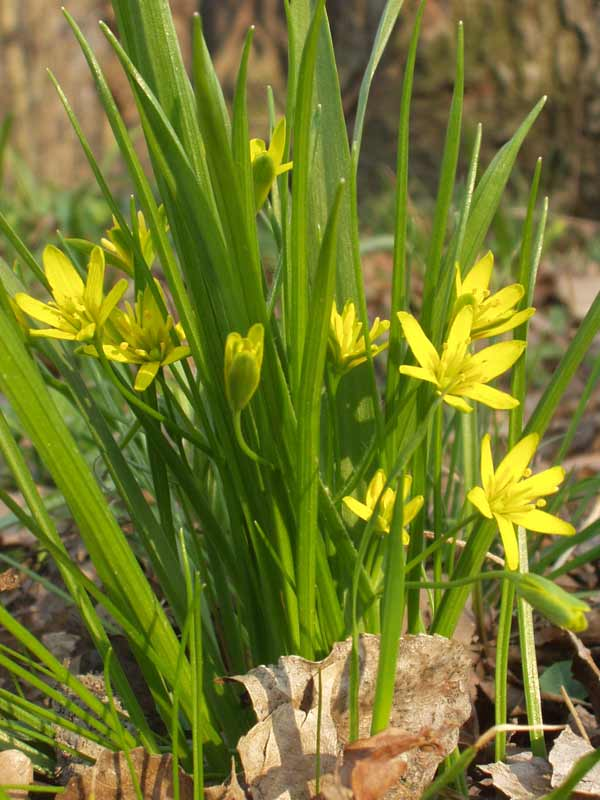
- Gagea lutea

Scientific classification
- Kingdom: Plantae
- Clade: Tracheophytes
- Clade: Angiosperms
- Clade: Monocots
- Order: Liliales
- Family: Liliaceae
- Subfamily: Lilioideae
- Tribe: Lilieae; Ritgen

Genera
- Erythronium; Gagea; Nomocharis; Tulipa; Sensu stricto: Cardiocrinum; Fritillaria; Lilium; Notholirion

= Lilieae =

Tribe of flowering plants in family Liliaceae, including lilies and tulips

The Lilieae are a monophyletic tribe of monocotyledon perennial, herbaceous mainly bulbous flowering plants in the lily family (Liliaceae).

== Taxonomy ==
The term has varied over the years but in modern classification constitutes either a broad circumscription (Lilieae sensu lato, s.l.) with eight genera, placed in the subfamily Lilioideae, or narrower circumscription with four genera (Lilieae sensu stricto, s.s.), excluding Tulipa (which now includes Amana), Erythronium and Gagea (which now includes Lloydia) which are treated as a separate tribe, Tulipeae., and Lilium includes Nomocharis, reducing the number of genera in Lilieae to four, with about 260–300 species.

Distribution of Lilieae genera
Genera	Sensu stricto	Sensu lato
Cardiocrinum	Lilieae	Lilieae
Notholirion	Lilieae	Lilieae
Nomocharis	Lilieae	Lilieae
Fritillaria	Lilieae	Lilieae
Lilium	Lilieae	Lilieae
Gagea	Tulipeae	Lilieae
Lloydia	Tulipeae	Lilieae
Amana	Tulipeae	Lilieae
Tulipa	Tulipeae	Lilieae
Erythronium	Tulipeae	Lilieae

=== Phylogeny ===
The evolutionary and phylogenetic relationships between the genera currently included in Liliaceae are shown in this cladogram.

Cladogram: Phylogeny and biogeography of the genera of the Liliaceae

- Liliaceae
  - - West NA
      - Tricyrtis
      - - Streptopoideae
          - Streptopus
          - - Prosartes
            - Scoliopus
  - - West NA
      Calochortus
    - Lilioideae* East NA EA
      - Medeoleae East NA
        - Clintonia
        - Medeola
      - Lilieae s.l. EA
        - Tulipeae East Asia
          - - Tulipa
            - - Amana
              - Erythronium
          - - Gagea (Lloydia)
        - Lilieae s.s. Himalayas
          - Notholirion
          - - Cardiocrinum
            - - Lilium (Nomocharis)
              - Fritillaria

Phylogenetic tree reflecting relationships based on molecular phylogenetic evidence.
*=Liliaceae sensu Tamura; EA=Eurasia NA=North America

== Distribution and habitat ==
Lilieae s.s. are distributed in temperate Northern Hemisphere areas, with the main centre of diversity in the Qinghai–Tibet Plateau, where about 100 species may be found. Other areas include East Asia, Central and West Asia, the Mediterranean Basin and North America.

== See also ==
- Taxonomy of Liliaceae
- Tulipeae

== Bibliography ==
=== Books ===
- Kamenetsky, Rina; Okubo, Hiroshi, eds. (2012). Ornamental Geophytes: From Basic Science to Sustainable Production. CRC Press. ISBN 978-1-4398-4924-8.
- Meerow, A.W. (2012-09-17). Taxonomy and Phylogeny: Liliaceae. pp. 17–55. ISBN 978-1-4398-4924-8. In Kamenetsky & Okubo (2012)

=== Articles ===
- Gao, Yun-Dong; Zhou, Song-Dong; He, Xing-Jin; Wan, Juan (January 2012). "Chromosome diversity and evolution in tribe Lilieae (Liliaceae) with emphasis on Chinese species". Journal of Plant Research. 125 (1): 55–69. doi:10.1007/s10265-011-0422-1. ISSN 0918-9440. PMID 21559881. S2CID 10185112.
- Huang, Jiao; Yang, Li-Qin; Yu, Yan; Liu, Yan-Mei; Xie, Deng-Feng; Li, Juan; He, Xing-Jin; Zhou, Song-Dong (2 August 2018). "Molecular phylogenetics and historical biogeography of the tribe Lilieae (Liliaceae): bi-directional dispersal between biodiversity hotspots in Eurasia". Annals of Botany. 122 (7): 1245–1262. doi:10.1093/aob/mcy138. PMC 6324749. PMID 30084909.
- Kim, Jung Sung; Hong, Jeong-Ki; Chase, Mark W.; Fay, Michael F.; Kim, Joo-Hwan (May 2013). "Familial relationships of the monocot order Liliales based on a molecular phylogenetic analysis using four plastid loci: matK, rbcL, atpB and atpF-H". Botanical Journal of the Linnean Society. 172 (1): 5–21. doi:10.1111/boj.12039.
- Kim, Jung Sung; Kim, Joo-Hwan; Robinson-Rechavi, Marc (14 June 2013). "Comparative Genome Analysis and Phylogenetic Relationship of Order Liliales Insight from the Complete Plastid Genome Sequences of Two Lilies (Lilium longiflorum and Alstroemeria aurea)". PLoS ONE. 8 (6) e68180. Bibcode:2013PLoSO...868180K. doi:10.1371/journal.pone.0068180. PMC 3688979. PMID 23950788.
- Leitch, I. J.; Beaulieu, JM; Cheung, K; Hanson, L; Lysak, MA; Fay, MF (November 2007). "Punctuated genome size evolution in Liliaceae". Journal of Evolutionary Biology. 20 (6): 2296–308. doi:10.1111/j.1420-9101.2007.01416.x. PMID 17956392.
- Patterson, T. B.; Givnish, T. J. (2002). "Phylogeny, concerted convergence, and phylogenetic niche conservatism in the core Liliales: insights from rbcL and ndhF sequence data". Evolution. 56 (2): 233–252. doi:10.1111/j.0014-3820.2002.tb01334.x. PMID 11926492.
- Peruzzi, L.; Leitch, I.J.; Caparelli, K.F. (2009). "Chromosome diversity and evolution in Liliaceae". Annals of Botany. 103 (3): 459–475. doi:10.1093/aob/mcn230. PMC 2707325. PMID 19033282.
- Vinnersten, A.; Bremer, K. (September 2001). "Age and biogeography of major clades in Liliales". American Journal of Botany. 88 (9): 1695–1703. doi:10.2307/3558415. JSTOR 3558415. PMID 21669704.

=== Websites ===
- Stevens, P.F. (2017) [2001]. "Liliaceae". AP Web v. 14. Missouri Botanical Garden. (see also Angiosperm Phylogeny Website)
