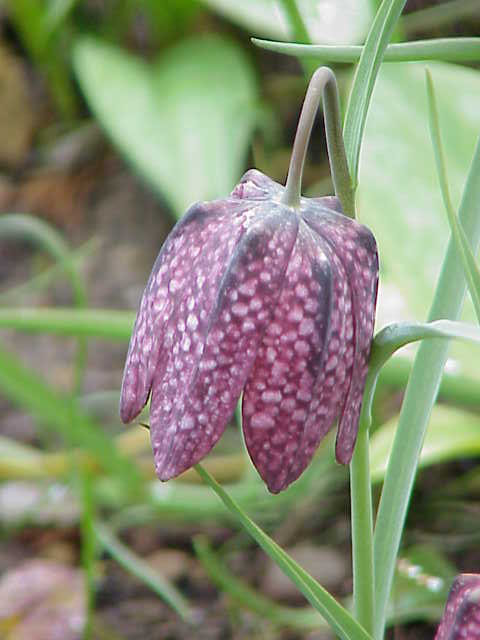
- Fritillaria meleagris

Scientific classification
- Kingdom: Plantae
- Clade: Tracheophytes
- Clade: Angiosperms
- Clade: Monocots
- Order: Liliales
- Family: Liliaceae
- Subfamily: Lilioideae
- Tribe: Lilieae
- Genus: Fritillaria; Tourn. ex L.

Type species
- Fritillaria meleagris L.

Subgenera
- Subgenera (8): Davidii Rix; Fritillaria; Japonica Rix; Korolkowia Rix; Liliorhiza (Kellog) Benth. & Hook.f.; Petilium (L.) Endl.; Rhinopetalum Fisch.; Theresia Koch

Diversity
- About 140 species

Synonyms
- Synonyms: Petilium Ludw.; Imperialis Adans.; Amblirion Raf.; Rhinopetalum Fisch. ex D.Don; Baimo Raf.; Corona Fisch. ex Graham; Melorima Raf.; Eucrinum (Nutt.) Lindl.; Theresia K.Koch; Tozzettia Parl. 1854 (Note: Tozzettia, illegitimate homonym not Savi 1799 (Poaceae)); Liliorhiza Kellogg; Lyperia Salisb. nom. superfl.; Korolkowia Regel; Sarana Fisch. ex Baker; Ochrocodon Rydb.; Monocodon Salisb.

= Fritillaria =

Genus of flowering plants

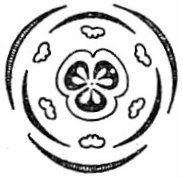
Floral diagram of Fritillaria flower

Fritillaria (fritillaries) is a genus of spring flowering herbaceous bulbous perennial plants in the lily family (Liliaceae). The type species, Fritillaria meleagris, was first described in Europe in 1571, while other species from the Middle East and Asia were also introduced to Europe at that time. The genus has about 130–140 species divided among eight subgenera. The flowers are usually solitary, nodding and bell-shaped with bulbs that have fleshy scales, resembling those of lilies. They are known for their large genome size and genetically are very closely related to lilies. They are native to the temperate regions of the Northern Hemisphere, from the Mediterranean and North Africa through Eurasia and southwest Asia to western North America. Many are endangered due to enthusiastic picking.

The name Fritillaria is thought to refer to the checkered pattern of F. meleagris, resembling a box in which dice were carried. Fritillaries are commercially important in horticulture as ornamental garden plants and also in traditional Chinese medicine, which is also endangering some species. Fritillaria flowers have been popular subjects for artists to depict and as emblems of regions and organizations.

== Description ==
Morphology

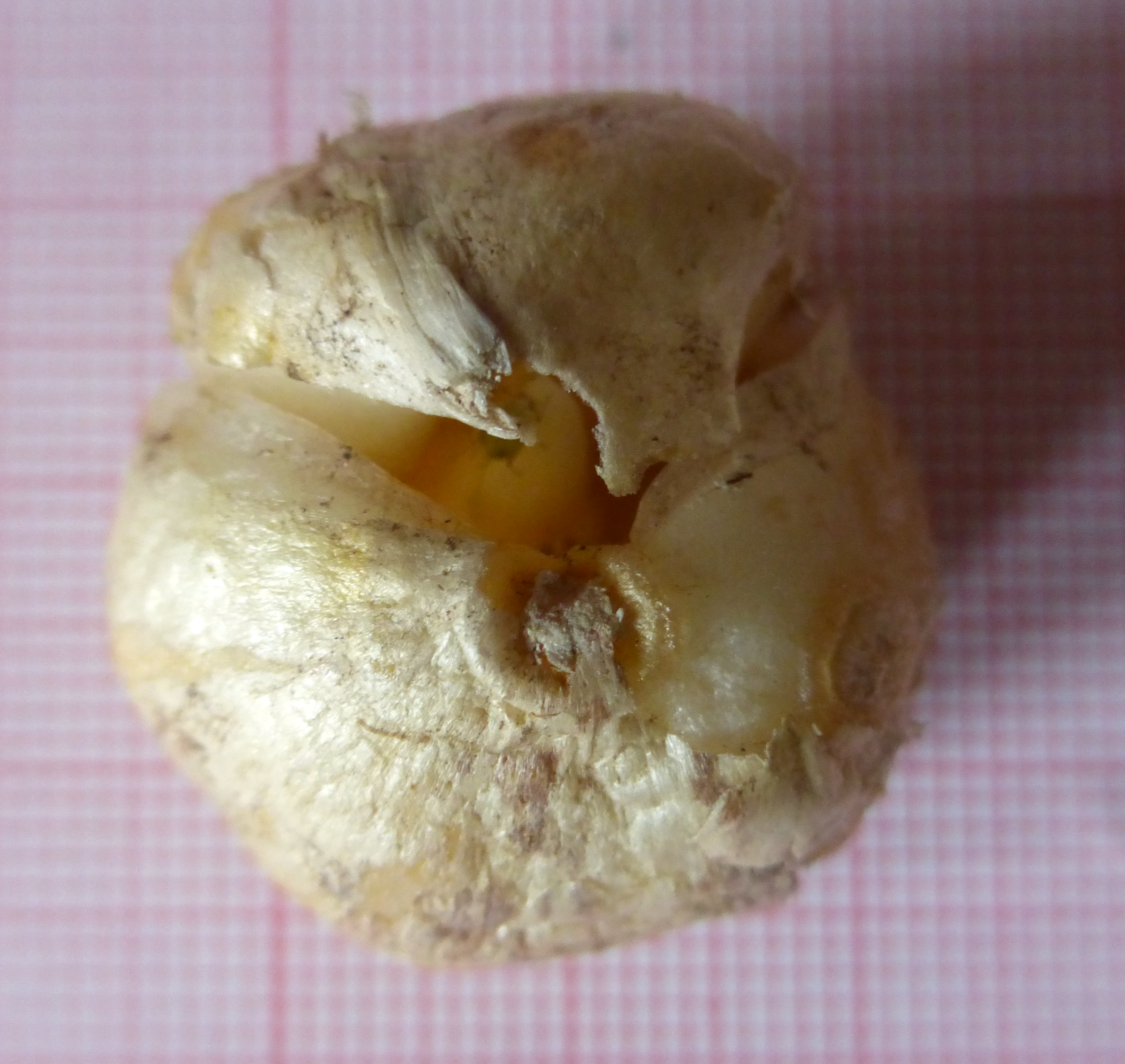
Bulb: F. uva-vulpis

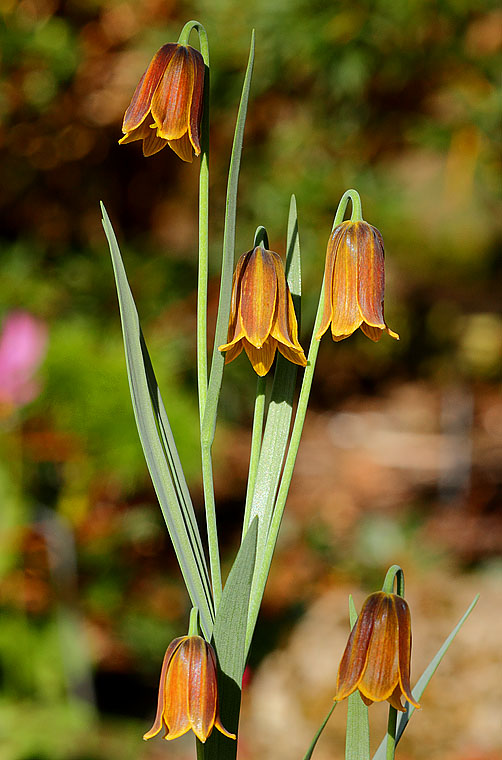
Stem and leaves: F. drenovskii

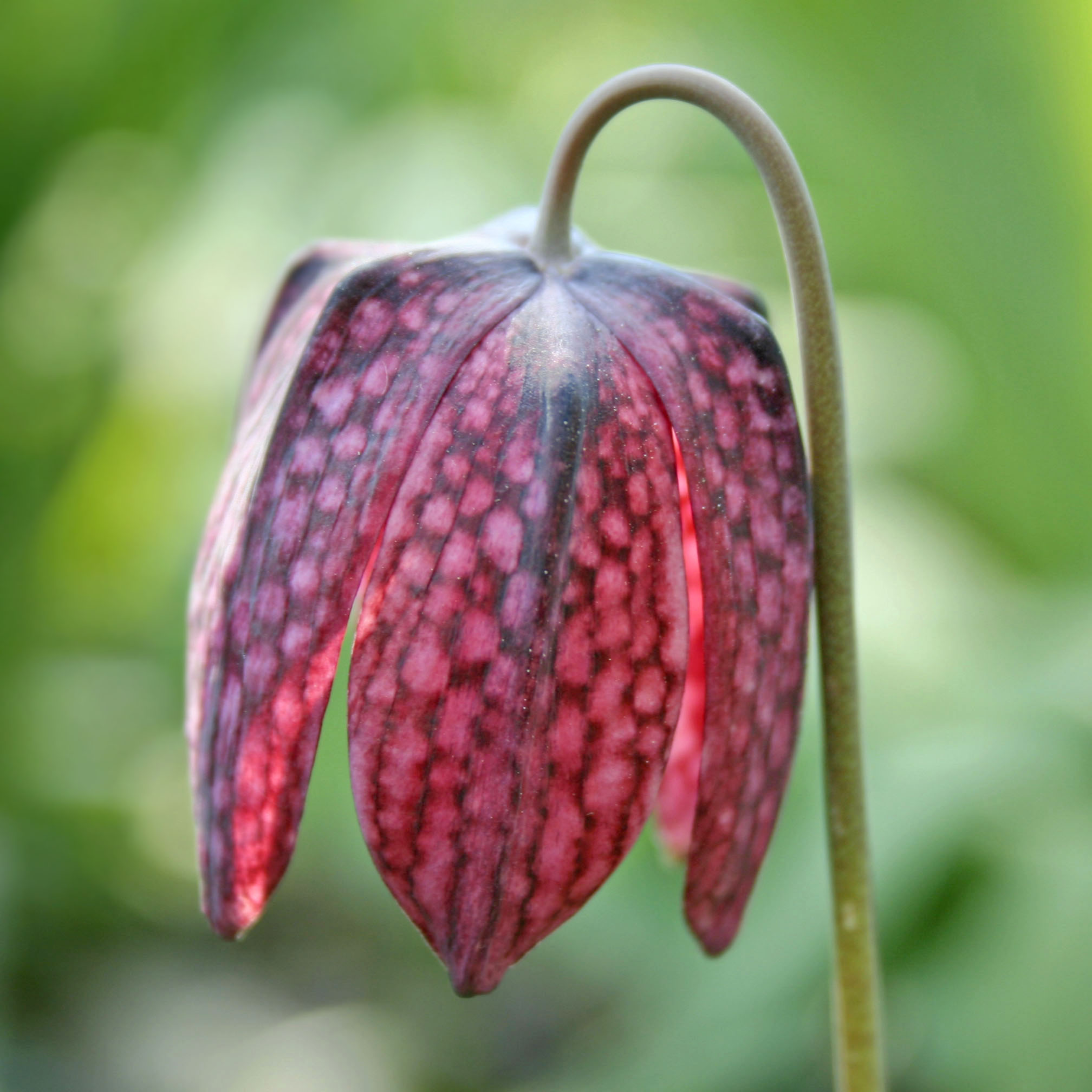
F meleagris with campanulate perianth and tesselated segments

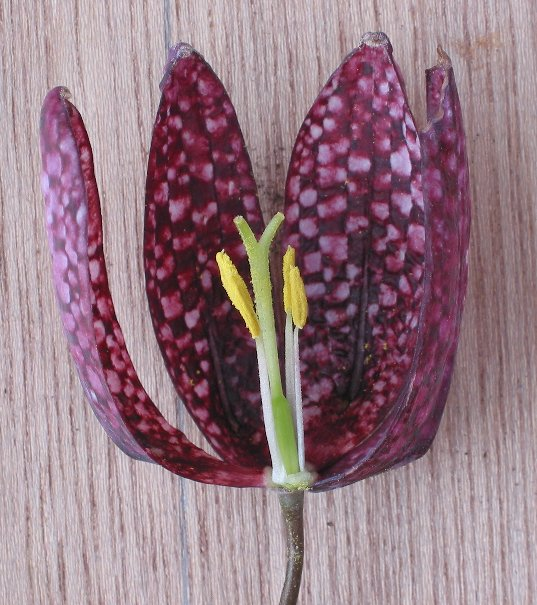
Section through flower of F. meleagris

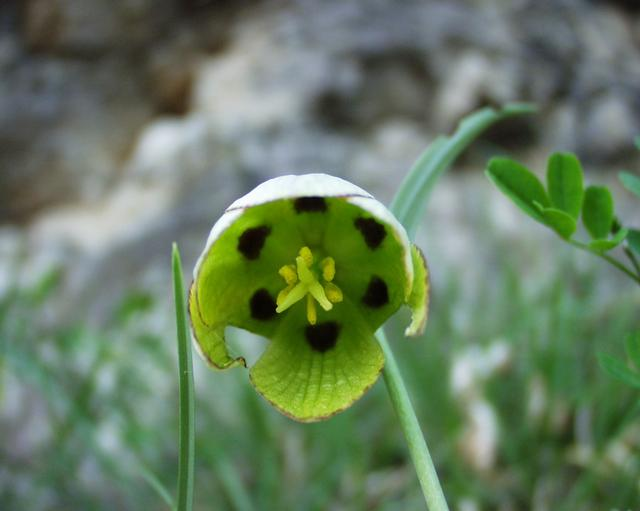
Internal structures: F. involucrata

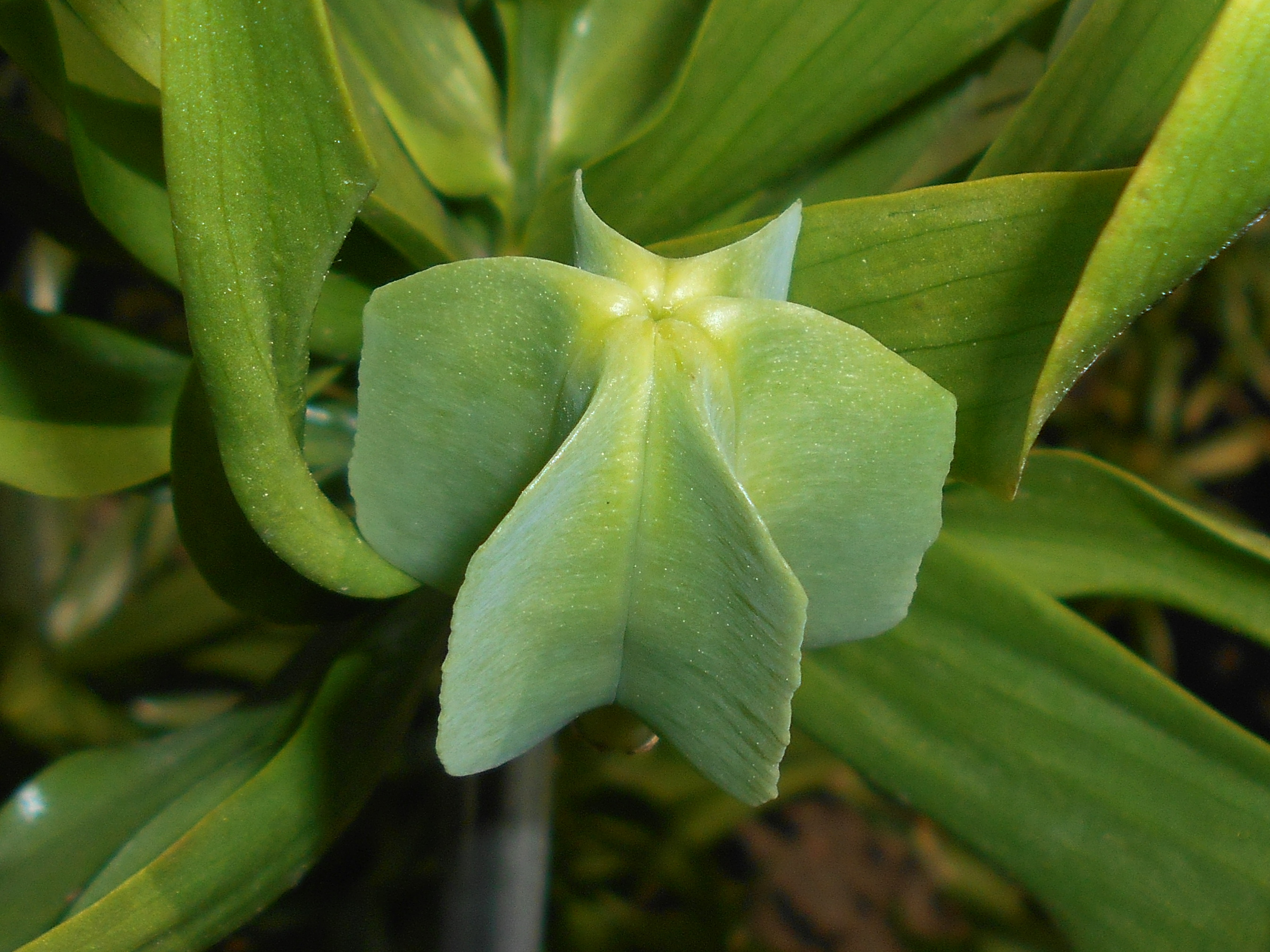
Fruit: F. imperialis

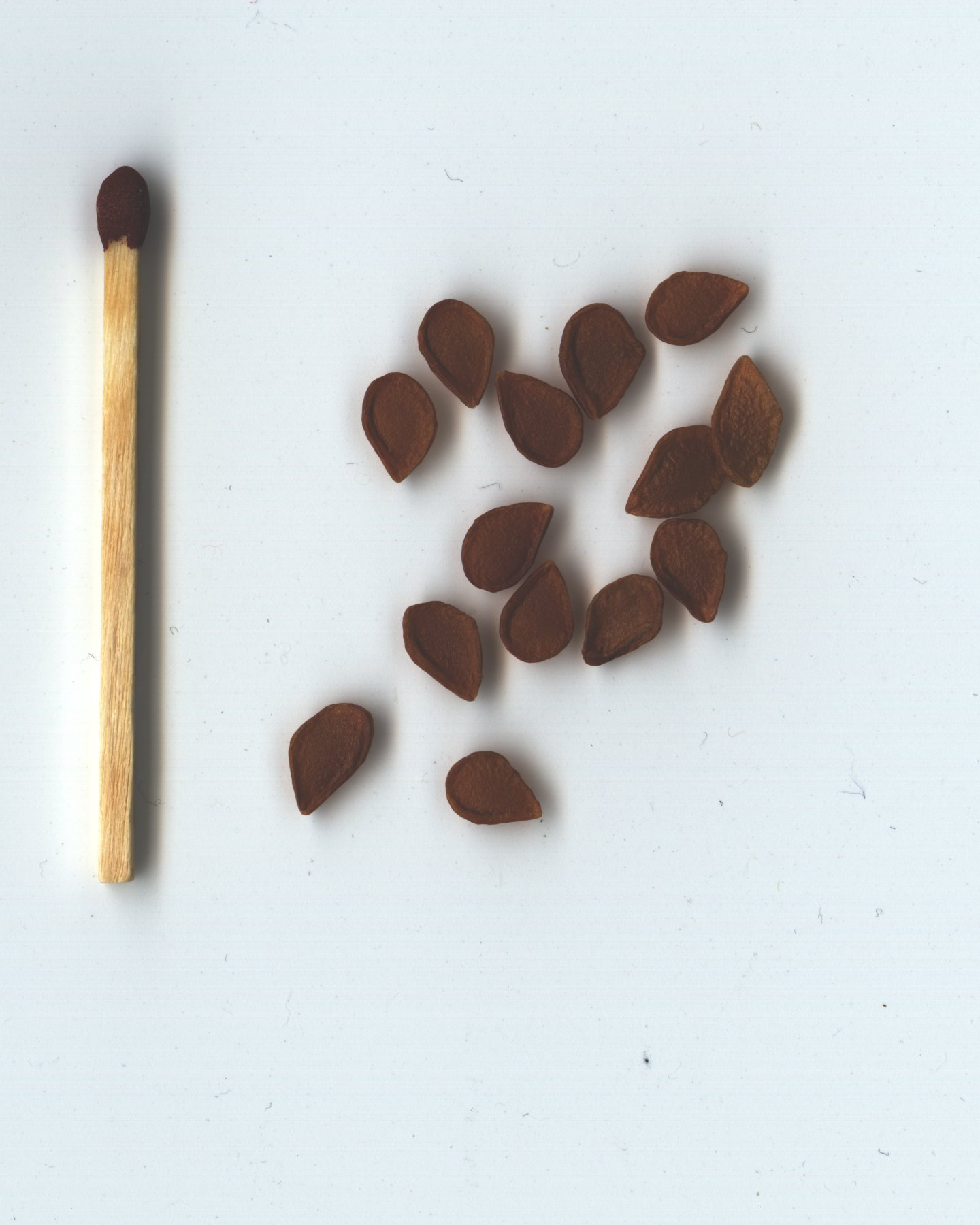
Seeds: F. pallidiflora

=== General ===
Fritillaria is a genus of perennial herbaceous bulbiferous geophytes, dying back after flowering to an underground storage bulb from which they regrow in the following year. It is characterised by nodding (pendant) flowers, perianths campanulate (bell- or cup-shaped) with erect segments in upper part, a nectarial pit, groove or pouch at the base of the tepal, anthers usually pseudobasifixed, rarely versatile, fruit sometimes winged, embryo minute.

=== Specific ===
==== Vegetative ====
Bulbs

The bulbs are typically tunicate, consisting of a few tightly packed fleshy scales with a translucent tunic that disappears with further growth of the bulb. However, some species (F. imperialis, F. persica) have naked bulbs with many scales and loosely attached bulbils, resembling those of the closely related Lilium, although F. persica has only a single scale.

Stems and leaves

The stems have few or many cauline leaves (arising from the stem) that are opposite on the stem or verticillate (arranged in whorls), sometimes with a cirrhose apex (ending in a tendril).

==== Reproductive ====
Inflorescence and flowers

The inflorescence bears flowers that are often solitary and nodding, but some form umbels or have racemes with many flowers. The flowers are usually actinomorphic (radially symmetric), but weakly zygomorphic (single plane of symmetry) in F. gibbosa and F. ariana. The campanulate perianth has six tepals, in two free whorls of three (trimerous), that can be white, yellow, green, purple or reddish. The erect segments are usually tesselated with squares of alternating light and dark colours. While the tepals are usually the same size in both whorls, in F. pallidiflora, the outer tepals are wider. The tepals have nectarial pits, grooves (F. sewerzowii) or pouches at their base. In F. persica the nectarial pouch is developed into a short spur. The perigonal nectaries are large and well developed, and in most species (with the exception of subgenus Rhinopetalum), are linear to lanceolate or ovate and weakly impressed upon the tepals. Extrafloral nectaries are present at least the northwest American species according to Mizell 2004.

Gynoecium

The flowers are bisexual, containing both male (androecium) and female (gynoecium) characteristics. The pistil has three carpels (tricarpellary). The ovaries are hypogynous (superior, that is attached above the other floral parts). The ovule is anatropous in orientation and has two integuments (bitegmic), the micropyle (opening) being formed from the inner integument, while the nucellus is small. The embryo sac or megagametophyte is tetrasporic, in which all four megaspores survive. The style is trilobate to trifid (in 3 parts) and the surface of the stigma is wet.

Androecium

Stamens are six, in two trimerous whorls of three, and diplostemonous (outer whorl of stamens opposite outer tepals and the inner whorl opposite inner tepals). Filaments filiform or slightly flattened, but sometimes papillose and rarely hairy (F. karelinii). Anthers are linear to ellipsoid, but rarely subglobose (F. persica) in shape, and their attachment to the filament is usually pseudobasifixed (connective tissue extends in a tube around the filament tip), rarely attached at the centre and free (dorsifixed versatile; F. fusca and some Liliorhiza species). In contrast, pseudobasifixed anthers can not move freely. The pollen grains are spheroidal and reticulate (net like pattern), with individual brochi (lumina within reticulations) of 4–5 μm.

Fruit and seeds

The capsule is obovoid to globose, loculicidal and six-angled, sometimes with wings. The seeds are flattened with a marginal wing, the seed coat made out of both integuments, but the testa is thin and the endosperm lacks starch. The embryo is small.

=== Phytochemistry ===
Fritillaria, like other members of the family Liliaceae, contain flavonol glycosides and tri- and diferulic-acid sucrose esters, steroidal alkaloids, saponins and terpenoids that have formed the active ingredients in traditional medicine (see Traditional medicine). Certain species have flowers that emit disagreeable odors that have been referred to as phenolic, putrid, sulfurous, sweaty and skunky. The scent of Fritillaria imperialis has been called "rather nasty", while that of F. agrestis, known commonly as stink bells, is reminiscent of canine feces. On the other hand, F. striata has a sweet fragrance. The "foxy" odor of F. imperialis has been identified as 3-methyl-2-butene-1-thiol (dimethylallyl mercaptan), an alkylthiol.

=== Genome ===
Fritillaria represents one of the most extreme cases of genome size expansion in angiosperms. Polyploidy is rare, with nearly all species being diploid and only occasional reports of triploidy. Reported genome size in Fritillaria vary from 1Cx (DNA content of unreplicated haploid chromosome complement) values of 30.15 to 85.38 Gb (Giga base pairs), that is > 190 times that of Arabidopsis thaliana, which has been called the "model plant" and > 860 times that of Genlisea aurea, which represents the smallest land plant genome sequenced to date. Giant genome size is generally defined as >35 pg (34 Gb). The largest genomes in diploid Fritillaria are found in subgenus Japonica, exceeding 85 Gb. At least one species, tetraploid F. assyriaca, has a very large genome. With approximately 127 pg (130 Gb), it was for a long time the largest known genome, exceeding the largest vertebrate animal genome known to date, that of the marbled lungfish (Protopterus aethiopicus), in size. Heterochromatin levels vary by biogeographic region, with very little in Old World and abundant levels in New World species. Most species have a basic chromosome number of x=12, but x=9, 11 and 13 have been reported.

== Taxonomy ==
=== History ===
==== Pre-Linnaean ====
Gerard (1597) states that Fritillaria was unknown to the ancients, but certainly it was appearing in the writings of sixteenth century European botanists, including Dodoens (1574, 1583), Lobelius (1576, 1581), and Clusius (1583) in addition to Gerard, and was mentioned by Shakespeare and other authors of the period (see Culture). Species of Fritillaria were known in Persia (Iran) in the sixteenth century, from where they were taken to Turkey. European travelers then brought back specimens together with many other exotic eastern plants to the developing botanical gardens of Europe. By the middle of the sixteenth century there was already a flourishing export trade of various bulbs from Turkey to Europe. In Persia, the first mention in the literature was by Hakim Mo'men Tonekabon in his Tohfe Al-Mo'menin in 1080 AH (c. 1669 AD), who described the medicinal properties of F. imperialis (laleh sarnegoun).

European fritillaries were documented in the wild amongst the Loire meadows in 1570 by Noël Capperon, (Note: Noel Capperon (Natalis Caperon), was one of the victims of the St Bartholomew's Day massacre of Huguenots in Orleans in 1572. Although not formally trained in botany, he had an international reputation. In the late 1560s, Thomas Penny, the English naturalist, came to visit him and study plant physiology.) an Orléans apothecary. He mentioned them to Clusius in correspondence in 1571, and sent him a specimen of F. meleagris. He also corresponded with Dodoens. Capperon suggested the name Fritillaria to Clusius, rather than the vernacular variegated lily (Lilium ou bulbum variegatum). He stated that the flower was known locally as Fritillaria because of a resemblance to the board used in playing checkers. (Note: Letter from Capperon to Clusius, December 12, 1571: fritillaria ainsi appelions nous la plante que vous demandez pour ce les merques ou taches rouges et blanches sont que cees et posees en ordre comme sont celles de noz damiers et eschiquers aucunes pour ceste raison mesme luy donnent ces noms comme pyrgoides ou rhomboydes. Latruncularium. Dames is the French word for Checkers or Draughts) In recognition of this, the botanical authority is sometimes written Fritillaria (Caperon) L.

The first account in a botanical text is by Dodoens in his Purgantium (1574) and in more detail in Stirpium (1583). In the Purgantium, Dodoens describes and illustrates F. meleagris as Meleagris flos, without mentioning Capperon. He was also aware, through having been sent a picture, of F. imperialis, and decided to include it as well, without making a connection. His term for F. imperialis was Corona imperialis.

Consequently, Lobelius, in his Plantarum (1576), gives Dodoens the credit for describing F. meleagris. He used the word "Fritillaria" for the first time, describing F. meleagris, which he considered to belong to the Lilio-Narcissus plants, including tulips. The term Lilio-Narcissus refers to an appearance of having lily-like flowers, but a narcissus-like bulb. He called it Fritillaria (synonyms Lilio-Narcissus purpurens variegatus or Meleagris flos Dodonaei). Lobelius also included amongst the lilies, but not as Fritillaria, Corona imperialis which he mentions originated in Turkey and added what he referred to as Lilium persicum (Fritillaria persica). In his later vernacular Kruydtboeck (1581) he described two species he considered related, Fritillaria Lilio-Narcissus purpurens variegatus and Lilio-Narcissus variegatus atropurpureus Xanctonicus. He acknowledged that the plant had originally been found near Orleans and then sent to the Netherlands. Fritillaria is ook een soort van lelie narcis die de oorsprong heeft uit het land van Orléans van waar dat ze gebracht is in Nederland. (Note: Lobelius: Fritillaria is also a type of lily narcissus that originates from the land of Orléans from where it was brought to the Netherlands) In his own language he referred to it as Fritillaria of heel bruin gespikkelde Lelie-Narcisse. (Note: Fritillaria, or the very brown speckled lily-narcissus) He also included Corona imperialis and Lilium persicum as before.

Dodoens had proposed the name Meleagris flos or Guinea-fowl flower, for what we now know as Fritillaria meleagris, after a resemblance to that bird's spotted plumage, then known as Meleagris avis. In the seventeenth century, John Parkinson provided an account of twelve species of what he referred to as Fritillaria - the checkered daffodil, in his Paradisus (1635), correctly placing it as closest to the lilies. He provides his version of Capperon's discovery, and suggests that some feel he should be honoured with the name Narcissus Caparonium. Often when these exotic new plants entered the English language literature they lacked common names in the language. While Henry Lyte can only describe F. meleagris as Flos meleagris, Fritillaria or lilionarcissus, it appears that it was Shakespeare who applied the common name of "chequered".

Although Clausius had corresponded with Capperon in 1571, he did not publish his account of European flora (other than Spain) till his Rariorum Pannoniam of 1583, where he gives an account of Capperon's discovery, noting the names, Fritillaria, Meleagris and Lilium variegatum. However he did not consider F. imperialis or F. persica to be related, calling both of them Lilium, Lilium persicum and Lilium susianum respectively.

==== Post-Linnaean ====
Although the first formal description is attributed to Joseph Pitton de Tournefort in 1694, by convention, the first valid formal description is by Linnaeus, in his Species Plantarum (1753),. Therefore, the botanical authority is given as Tourn. ex L.. Linnaeus identified five known species of Fritillaria, and grouped them in his Hexandria Monogynia (six stamens+one pistil), his system being based on sexual characteristics. These characteristics defined the core group of the family Liliaceae for a long time. Linnaeus' original species were F. imperialis, F. regia (now Eucomis regia), F. persica, F. pyrenaica and F. meleagris. The family Liliaceae was first described by Michel Adanson in 1763, placing Fritillaria in section Lilia of that family, but also considering Imperialis as a separate genus to Fritillaria, together with five other genera. The formal description of the family is attributed to Antoine Laurent de Jussieu in 1789, who included eight genera, including Imperialis, in his Lilia.

Although the circumscription of Liliaceae and its subdivisions have undergone considerable revision over the ensuing centuries, the close relationship between Fritillaria and Lilium the type genus of the family, have ensured that the former has remained part of the core group, which constitutes the modern much-reduced family. For instance, Bentham and Hooker (1883), placed Fritillaria and Lilium in Liliaceae tribe Tulipeae, together with five other genera.

=== Phylogeny ===
Fritillaria is generally considered a monophyletic genus, placed within the tribe Lilieae s.s., where it is a sister group to Lilium and the largest member of that tribe. The evolutionary and phylogenetic relationships between the genera currently included in Liliaceae are shown in the following Cladogram:

Cladogram: Phylogeny and biogeography of the genera of the Liliaceae

- Liliaceae
  - - West NA
      - Tricyrtis
      - - Streptopoideae
          - Streptopus
          - - Prosartes
            - Scoliopus
  - - West NA
      Calochortus
    - Lilioideae* East NA EA
      - Medeoleae East NA
        - Clintonia
        - Medeola
      - Lilieae s.l. EA
        - Tulipeae East Asia
          - - Tulipa
            - - Amana
              - Erythronium
          - - Gagea (Lloydia)
        - Lilieae s.s. Himalayas
          - Notholirion
          - - Cardiocrinum
            - - Lilium (Nomocharis)
              - Fritillaria

Phylogenetic tree reflecting relationships based on molecular phylogenetic evidence.
*=Liliaceae sensu Tamura; EA=Eurasia NA=North America

More recently, some larger phylogenetic studies of Lilieae, Lilium and Fritillaria have suggested that Fritillaria may actually consist of two distinct biogeographical clades (A and B), and that these are in a polytomous relationship with Lilium. This could mean that Fritillaria is actually two distinct genera, suggesting that the exact relationship is not yet fully resolved.

Cladogram of polytomy within Lilieae s.s.

- Lilieae s.s.
  - Notholirion
  - - Cardiocrinum
    - - Lilium
      - Fritillaria A
      - Fritillaria B

=== Subdivision ===
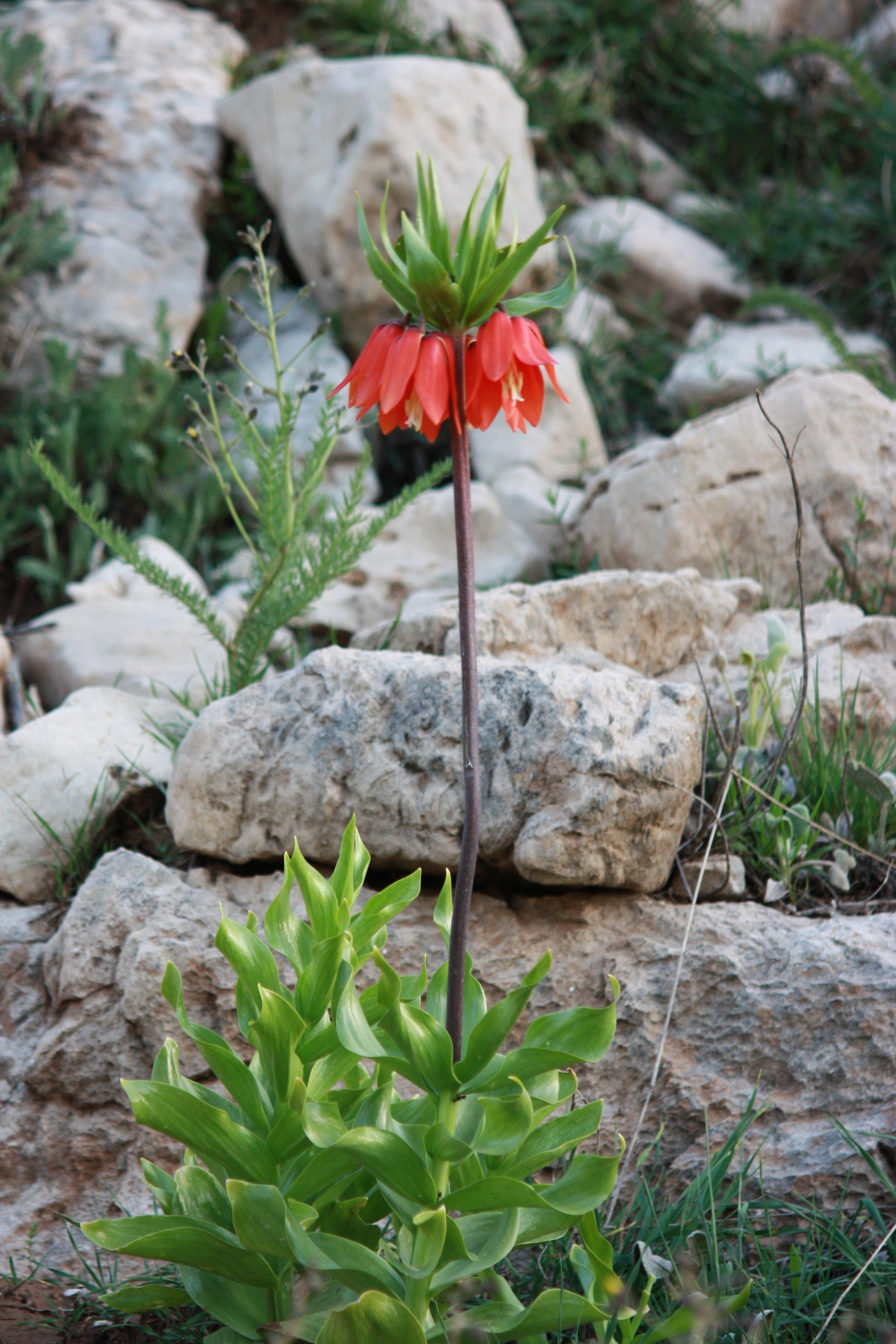
Fritillaria Imperialis in Dena, Iran

The large number of species have traditionally been divided into a number of subgroupings. By 1828, Duby in his treatment of the flora of France, recognized two subgroups, which he called section Meleagris and section Petilium. By 1874, Baker had divided 55 species into ten subgenera:

In the 1880s, both Bentham and Hooker (1883) and Boissier (1884) independently simplified this by reducing nine of these subgenera to five, which they treated as sections rather than subgenera. Bentham and Hooker, who recognized more than 50 species, transferred the tenth of Baker's subgenera, Notholirion to Lilium. Boissier, by contrast, in his detailed account of oriental species, recognized Notholirion as a separate genus, whose status has been maintained since (see cladogram). He also divided Eufritillaria into subsections.

In the post-Darwinian era, Komarov (1935) similarly segregated Rhinopetalum and Korolkowia as separate genera, but Turrill and Sealy (1980) more closely followed Boissier, but further divided Eufritillaria and placed all American species in Liliorhiza. However, the best known and cited of these classification schemes based on plant morphology is that of Martyn Rix, (Note: Martyn Rix's PhD thesis at Cambridge University was on Fritillaria, and he is the botanical authority for 30 species of Fritillaria) produced by the Fritillaria Group of the Alpine Garden Society in 2001. This listed 165 taxa grouped into 6 subgenera, 130 species, 17 subspecies, and 9 varieties. Rix, who described eight subgenera in all, restored both Rhinopetalum and Korolkowia as subgenera. He also used series to further subdivide subgenera, kept Boissier's four sections, renamed Eufritillaria as Fritillaria, and added subgenera Davidii and Japonica. The largest of these is Fritillaria, while Theresia, Korolkowia and Davidii are monotypic (containing a single species).

Comparison of Three Subdivisions of Fritillaria^{1}
Baker (1874) Subgenera	Boissier (1882)^{2} (Note: Boissier: Oriental species only, Lilorhiza excluded) Sections	Rix (2001) Subgenera
Eufritillaria (2)	Eufritillaria (30); 2 subsections	Fritillaria; 2 sections
Monocodon (24)	Eufritillaria (30); 2 subsections	Fritillaria; 2 sections
Goniocarpa (5)	Eufritillaria (30); 2 subsections	Fritillaria; 2 sections
Amblirion (9)	Eufritillaria (30); 2 subsections	Fritillaria; 2 sections
Rhinopetalum (1)	Theresia (2)	Rhinopetalum (5)
Theresia (3)	Theresia (2)	Theresia (1)^{3}
Petilium (1)	Petilium (1)	Petilium (4)^{4}
Liliorhiza (3)		Liliorhiza; 3 series
Korolkowia (1)		Korolkowia (1)^{5}
		Davidii (1)^{6}
		Japonica (5)
Notholirion (2)	Genus	Genus
Notes: 1. Number of species in (parentheses); 2. Boissier's Flora orientalis included only oriental species 3. Theresia: Fritillaria persica 4. Petilium: F. chitralensis, F. eduardii, F. imperialis and F. raddeana.; 5. Korolkowia: F. sewerzowii; 6. Davidii: F. davidii

Baker based his classification on the characteristics of the bulb, style, nectary and capsule valves. The large nectaries of Fritillaria have been the focus of much of the morphological classification, while the distinct form of the nectaries in Rhinopetalum were the basis for considering it a separate genus.

==== Molecular phylogenetics ====
The development of molecular phylogenetics and cladistic analysis has allowed a better understanding of the infrageneric relationships of Fritillaria species. Initial studies showed the major infrageneric split to be by biogeographic region into two clades, North America (clade A) and Eurasia (clade B). Clade A corresponded most closely with subgenus Liliorhiza.

A subsequent study by Rønsted and colleagues (2005), using an expanded pool of taxa of 37 species including all of Rix's subgenera and sections, confirmed the initial split on the basis of geography and supported the broad division of the genus into Rix's eight subgenera but not the deeper relationships (sections and series). Clade A corresponds with subgenus Liliorhiza centred in California, but a number of species (F. camschatcensis - Japan and Siberia), F. maximowiczii and F. dagana - Russia) are also found in Western Asia. These Asian species form a grade with the true North American species, suggesting an origin in Asia followed by later dispersal. Of clade B, the Eurasian species, the largest subgenus, Fritillaria, appeared to be polyphyletic in that F. pallidiflora appeared to segregate in subclade B1, with subgenera Petillium, Korolkowia and Theresia while all other species formed a clade within B2.

The phylogenetic, evolutionary and biogeographical relationships between the subgenera are shown in this cladogram:

Cladogram of infrageneric phylogeny and subgenera of Fritillaria (Rønsted et al 2005)

- Fritillaria
  - A: North America
    Liliorhiza
  - B: Eurasia
    - Davidii
    - - B1
        - Fritillaria 1*
        - - Theresia
          - - Korolkowia
            - Petilium
      - B2
        - Japonica
        - - Rhinopetalum
          - Fritillaria 2

* Fritillaria 1 refers to F. pallidiflora, which segregates in B1, thereby making subgenus Fritillaria polyphyletic

The number of taxa sampled was subsequently enlarged to 92 species (66% of all species), and all species in each subgenus except Rhinopetalum (80%), Liliorhiza and Fritillaria (60%). This expanded study further resolved the evolutionary relationships between the subgenera but also confirmed the polyphyletic nature of subgenus Fritillaria as shown in the following cladogram. The majority of taxa within this subgenus (Fritillaria 2) form a subclade centred in Europe, the Middle East and North Africa, but with some species ranging into China. The remainder (Fritillaria 1), being centred in China and Central Asia, but with some species ranging into North and South Asia. This group is therefore probably a separate subgenus.

Cladogram of infrageneric phylogeny and subgenera of Fritillaria with evolutionary and biogeographical relationships (Rønsted et al 2005) and (Day et al 2014)

- Fritillaria
  - A: N America,<br />NE Asia, China
    Liliorhiza
  - B: Eurasia
    - China
      Davidii
    - - B1: M East,<br />C Asia, China
        - M East
          Theresia
        - C Asia, China
          Fritillaria 1
        - - M East
            Petilium
          - NW Asia
            Korolkowia
      - B2
        - - NW Asia
            Rhinopetalum
          - Japan
            Japonica
        - Europe, N Africa,<br />M East, China
          Fritillaria 2

=== Subgenera ===
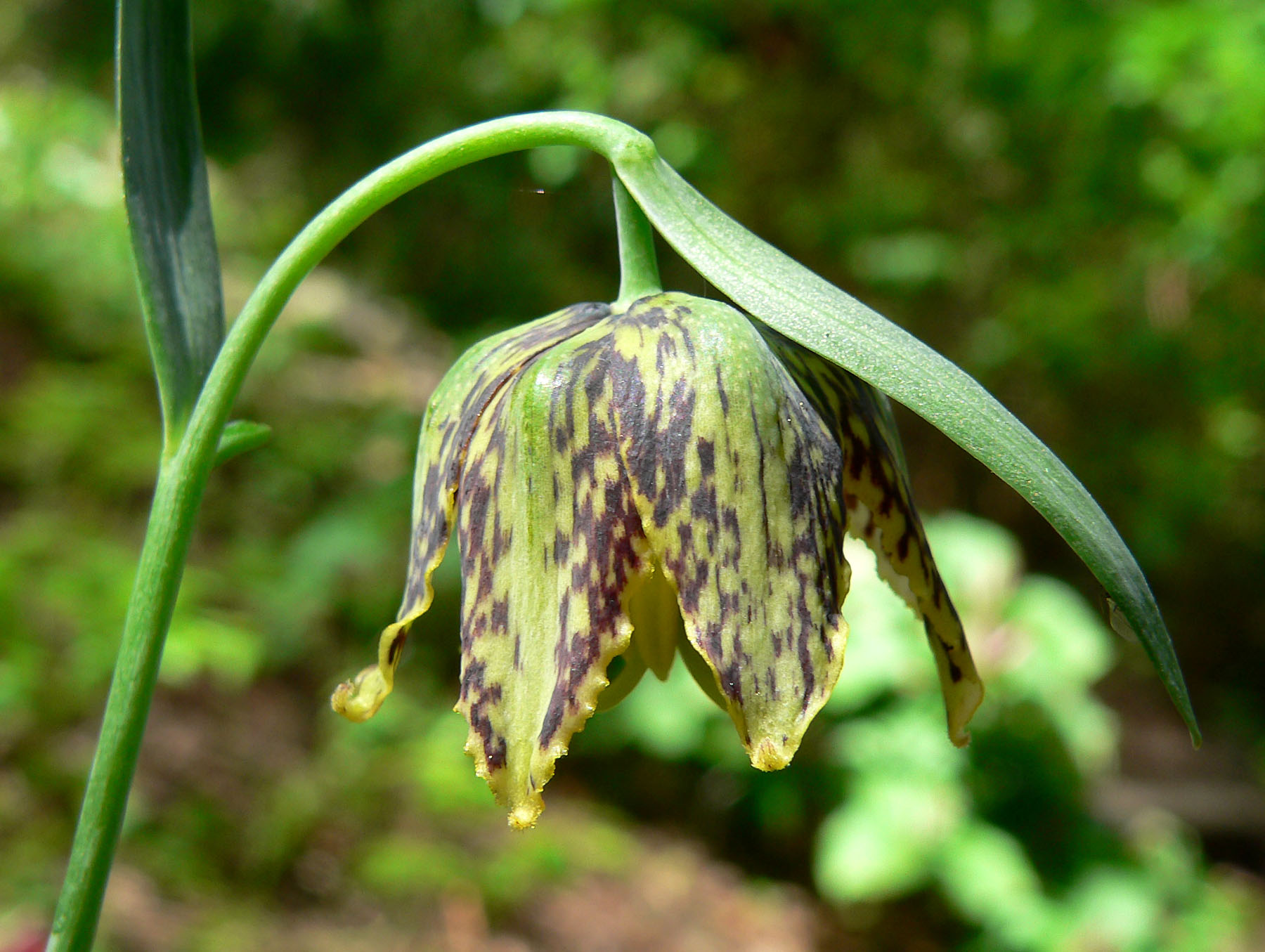
Fritillaria affinis

==== Subgenus Liliorhiza (Kellog) Benth. & Hook.f. ====
This subgenus of North American Fritillaria, centred on California constitutes Clade A and contains more than 20 species. They have distinctive bulbs with several imbricate (overlapping) scales. Their resemblance to the bulbs of Lilium lends this subgenus the name of Liliorhiza, or lily-roots. Most species exhibit loosely attached bulbils, whose size and shape gave them the name of "rice-grain bulbils". These are also seen in subgenus Davidii, but appear to have evolved independently. Stem leaves are whorled.

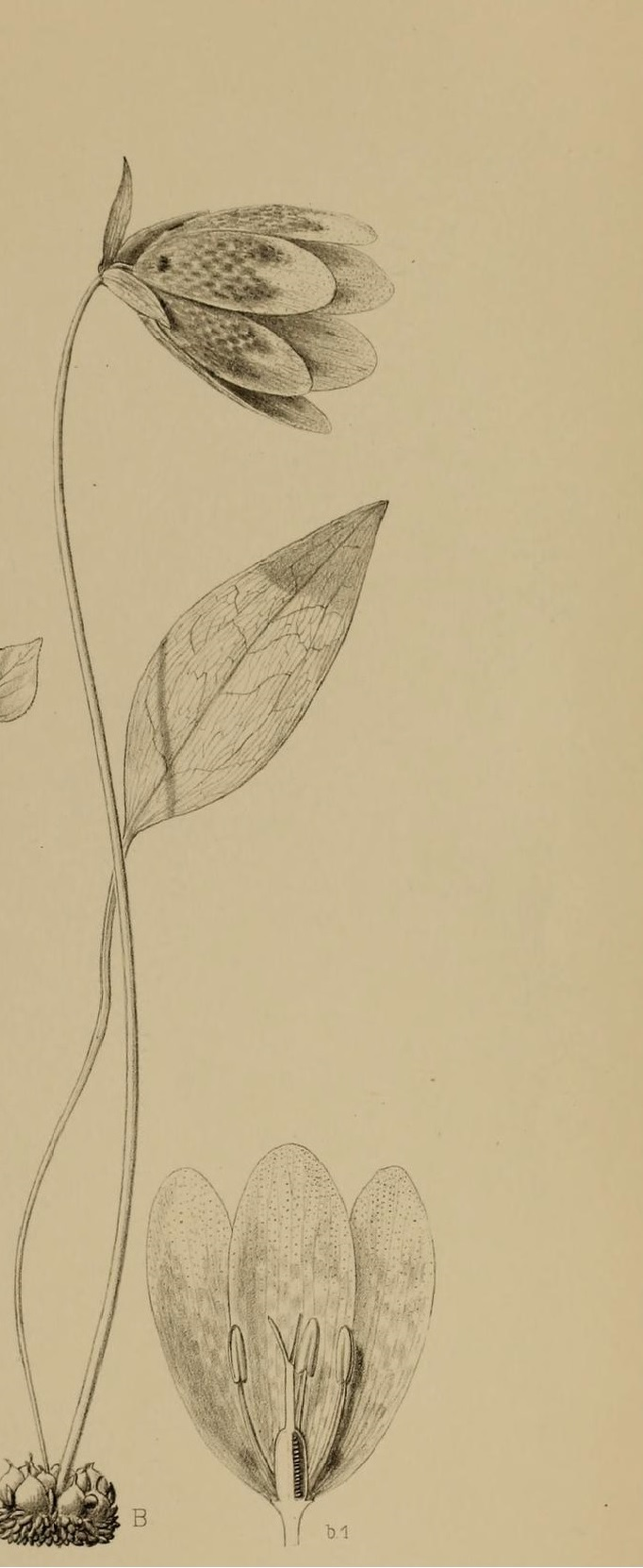
Fritillaria davidii

==== Subgenus Davidii Rix ====
This Chinese subgenus is monotypic for F. davidii. It shares with Liliorhiza the presence of "rice-grain bulbils" but is distinguished from it by only having basal leaves, and no stem leaves.

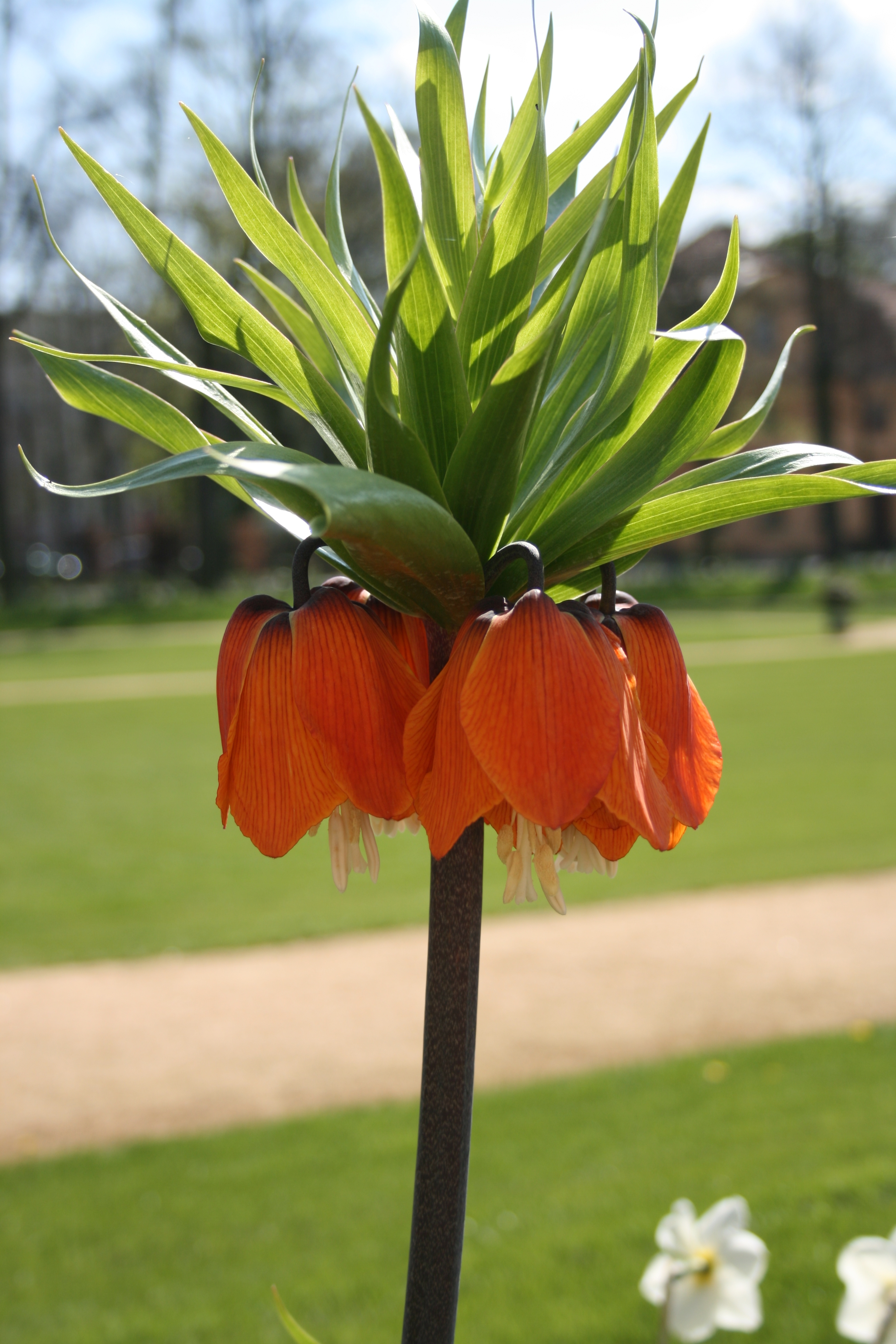
Fritillaria imperialis

==== Subgenus Petilium (L.) Endl. ====
Subgenus Petilium forms a subclade (B1), together with subgenera Korolkowia and Theresia. It is a relatively small subgenus of four species characterized by large (up to 100 cm) sturdy species, with bulbs that are much larger (up to 8 cm) than most Fritillaria with a few large, erect, imbricate and fleshy scales. Flowers are 3–5 in a terminal umbel, in the axils of the lower side of a leaf whorl. They have a trifid (3 lobed) style and winged seeds. The subgenus is found in Turkey, Iraq, Turkestan, Iran, Baluchistan, Afghanistan, and the western Himalayas. The best known example is F. imperialis (crown imperial).

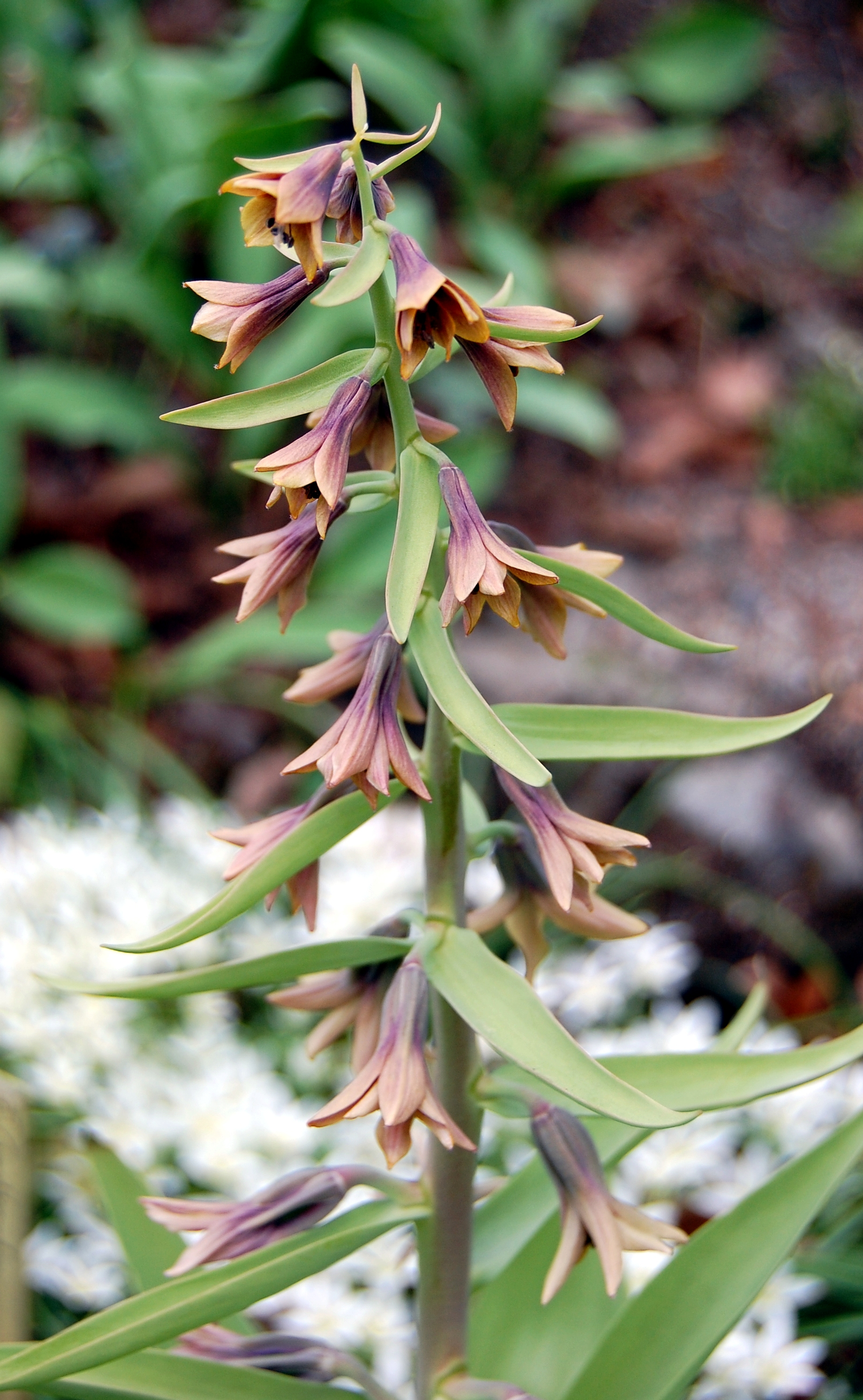
Fritillaria sewerzowii

==== Subgenus Korolkowia Rix ====
Korolkowia is monotypic for F. sewerzowii, a tall sturdy central Asian species, reaching 20–50 cm in height and bearing 8–10 more or less racemose flowers, with a large bulb consisting of a single 3–5 cm scale, and an entire style.

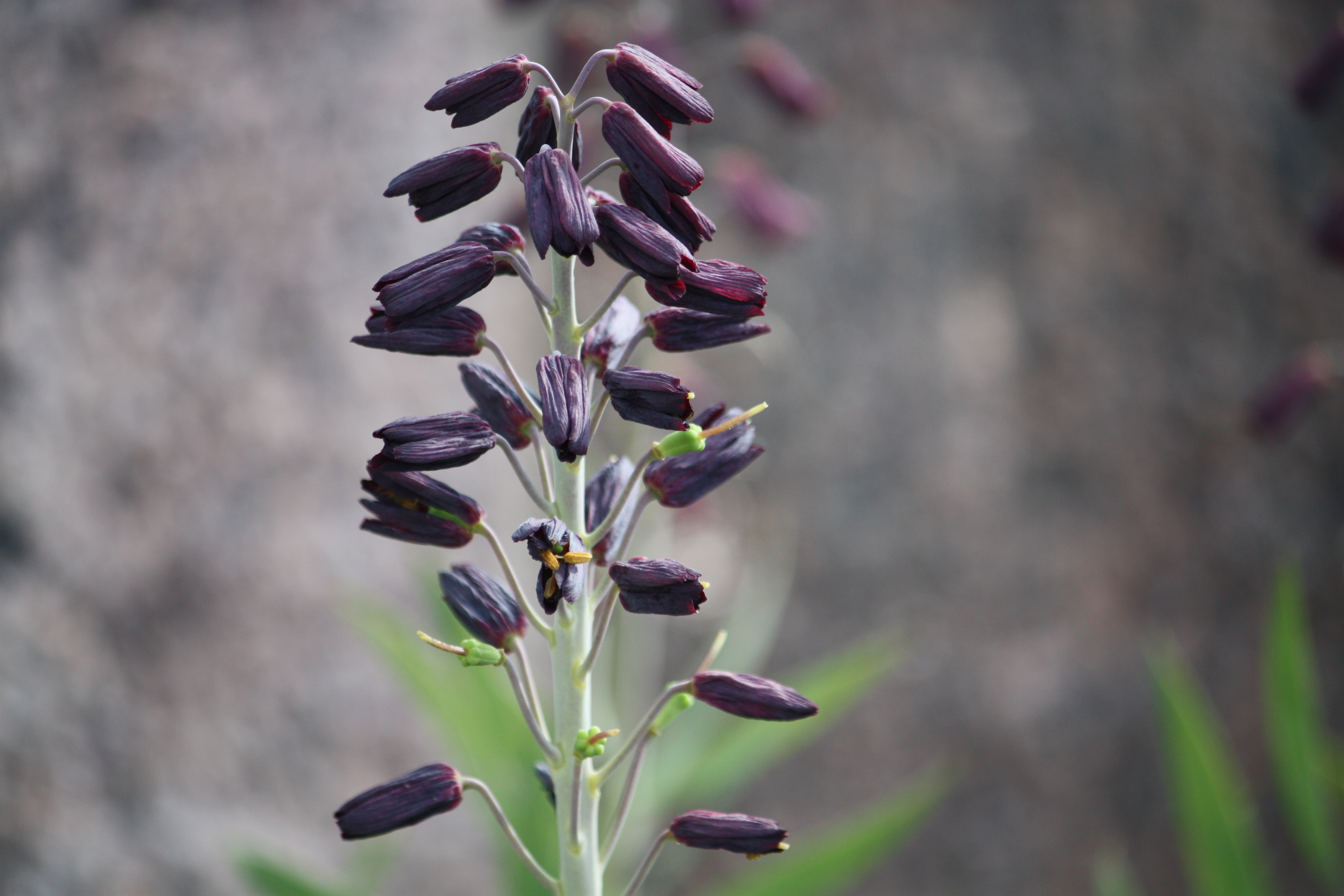
Fritillaria persica

==== Subgenus Theresia Koch ====
Theresia is monotypic for F. persica. This western Asian species, like Korolkowia has a bulb with a single large fleshy scale, second only to F. imperialis in size. It has numerous racemose flowers (over 30) arising from a tall stem which may reach 100 cm. The style is entire.

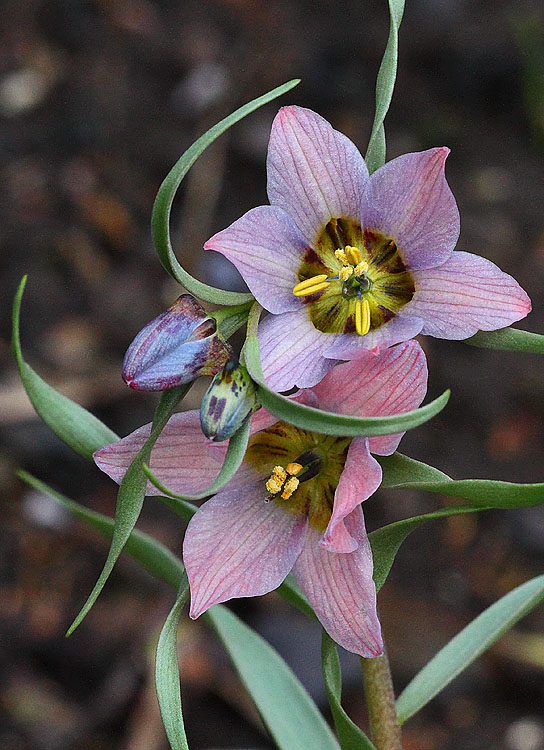
Fritillaria gibbosa

==== Subgenus Rhinopetalum Fisch. ====
Rhinopetalum together with subgenera Japonica and Fritillaria constitute subclade B2. It is a small subgenus of five species. They are characterized by their nectaries, which are deeply impressed and have a slit-like orifice on the tepals.

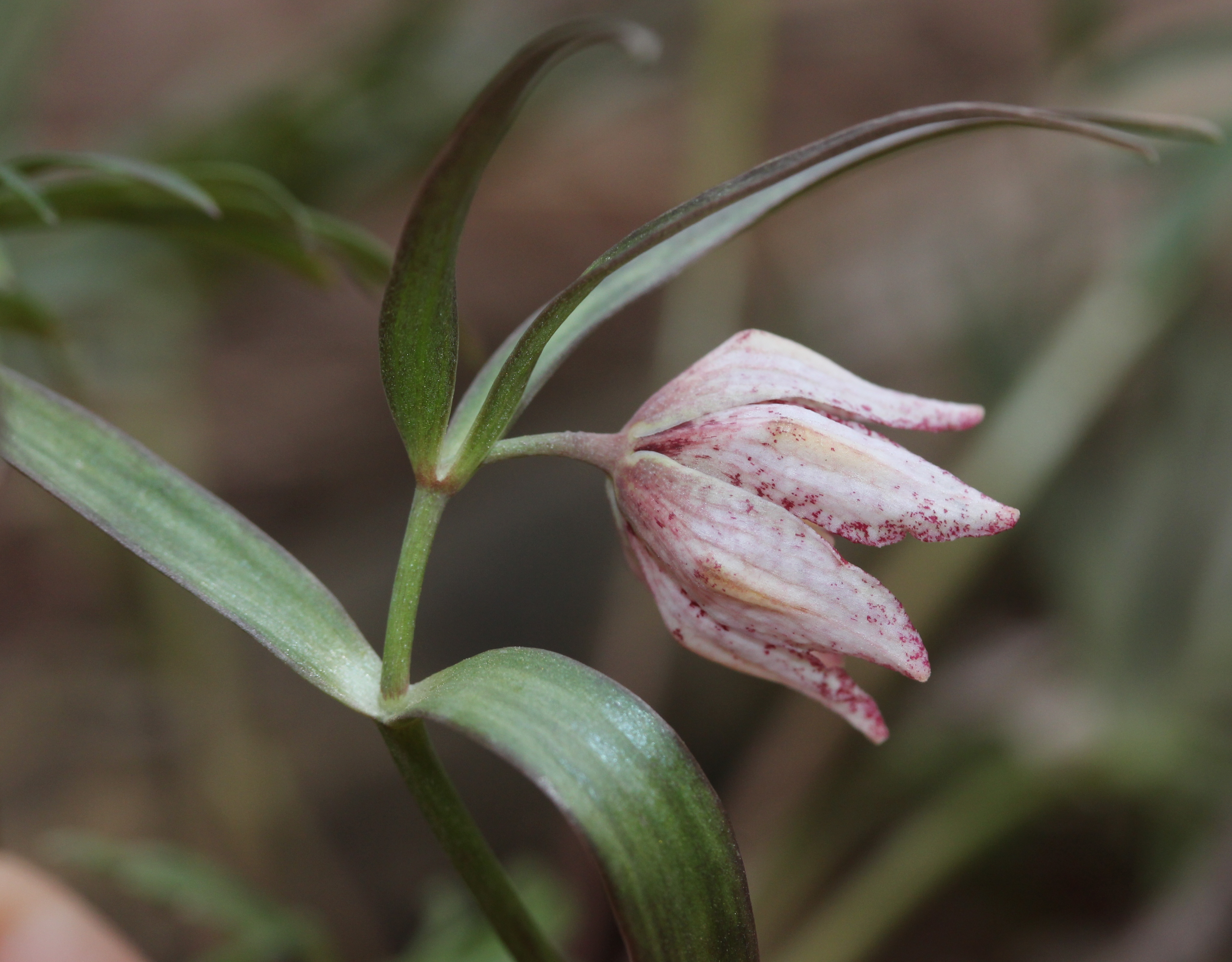
Fritillaria japonica

==== Subgenus Japonica Rix ====
Japonica consists of eight species. Rix characterised the subgenus as follows: "Bulb of 2 or 3 solid scales, without rice grains; plants small and delicate; seeds pear-shaped, Erythronium-like, not flat; stem collapsing when seeds are ripe. Japanese woodland plants".

The species in this subgenus are dwarf fritillaries, endemic to Japan, bearing a single small campanulate flower on a slender stem with three linear verticillate (in one or more whorls) leaves at its top and two broader, oblong to elliptical and opposite leaves about 1 cm below these. The flower is born on a short pedicel amongst the leaves.

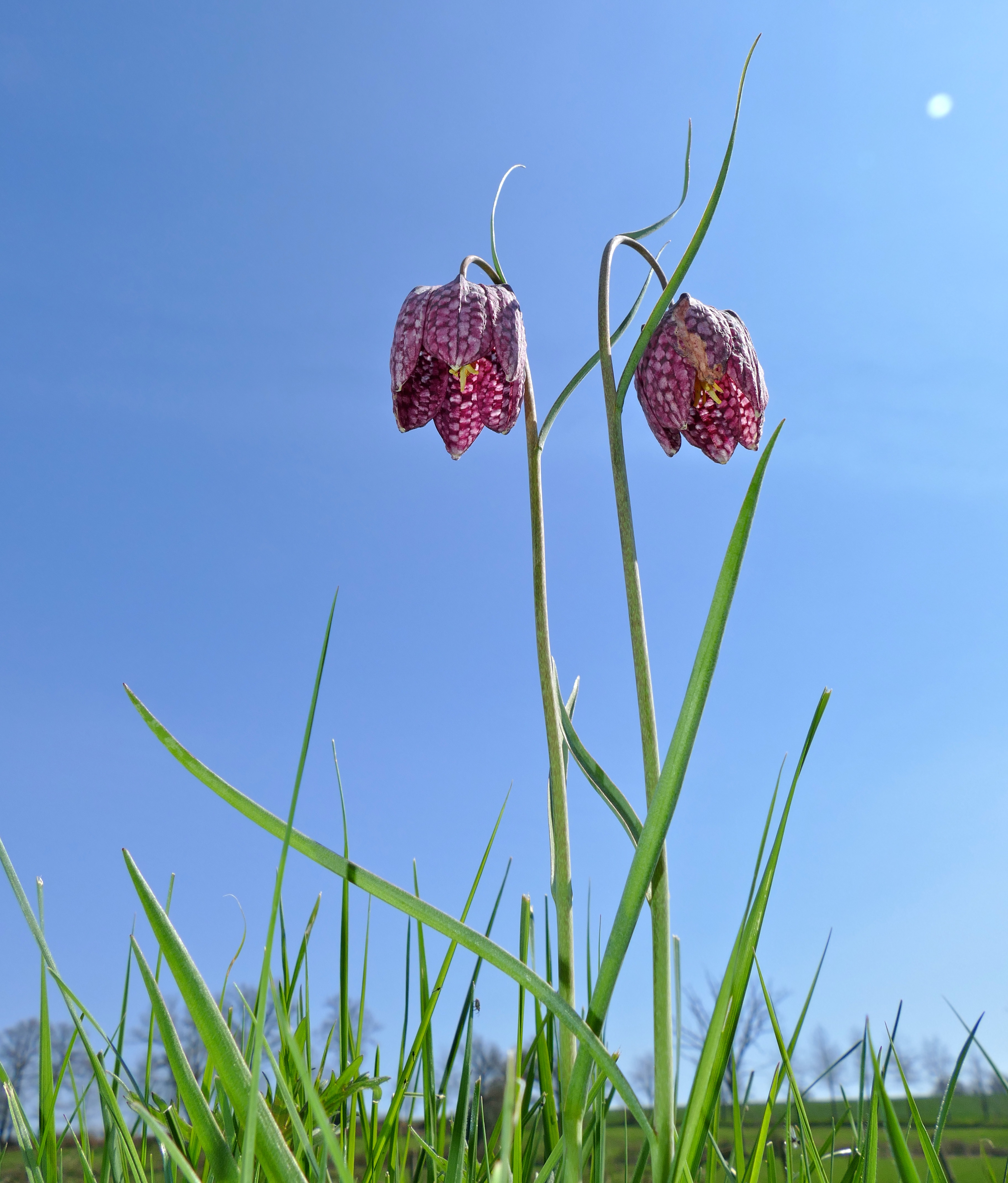
Fritillaria meleagris

==== Subgenus Fritillaria ====
Fritillaria is the largest subgenus, with about 100 species, or more than 70% of the total number of species in the genus, and includes the type species, F. meleagris. They are widely distributed from western Europe and the Mediterranean region to eastern Asia. Their characteristic is the Fritillaria-type bulb. This consists of two fleshy more or less tunicated scales that are subglobose. The tunica is formed by the remains of previous years' scales, but sometimes the previous scales persist leading to more than two scales, sometimes three or four. The style may be trifid or undivided, or only trilobulate at the apex (a characteristic that was previously thought to divide the subgenus into sections).

=== Species ===
The genus Fritillaria includes about 150 subordinate taxa, including species and subspecies. Estimates of the number of species vary from about 100 through 130–140. The Plant List (2013) includes 141 accepted species names, and 156 taxa in total.

== Biogeography and evolution ==
It is likely that two invasions across the Bering Straits to North America took place within the Lileae, one in each genus, Lilium and Fritillaria. Within the Eurasian clade, the two subclades differ in bulb type. In subclade B2 (Fritillaria, Rhinopetalum, and Japonica), the bulb type is described as Fritillaria-type, with 2–3 fleshy scales and the tunica derived from the remnants of previous year's scales. by contrast subclade B2 (Petilium, Theresia and Korolkowia) differ. Those of Theresia and Korolkowia are large, consisting of a single large fleshy scale, while Petilium species have several large erect imbricate scales. In Liliorhiza the bulbs are naked and have numerous scales similar to Lilium, but with numerous "rice-grain bulbils". The location of the bulbils differ from the more common aerial pattern of arising from within the axil of a leaf or inflorescence, as in Lilium and Allium. Similar bulbils are also found in Davidii. These bulbils arise in the axils of the scale leaves. Bulbils confer an evolutionary advantage in vegetative propagation.

== Etymology ==
When Noël Capperon, an Orléans apothecary, discovered F. meleagris growing in the Loire meadows in 1570, he wrote to Carolus Clusius, describing it, and saying that it was known locally as fritillaria, supposedly because the checkered pattern on the flower resembled the board on which checkers was played. Clusius believed this to be an error, in that fritillus is actually the Latin name for the box in which the dice used in the game were kept, not the board itself.

Some North American species are called "mission bells".

== Distribution and habitat ==
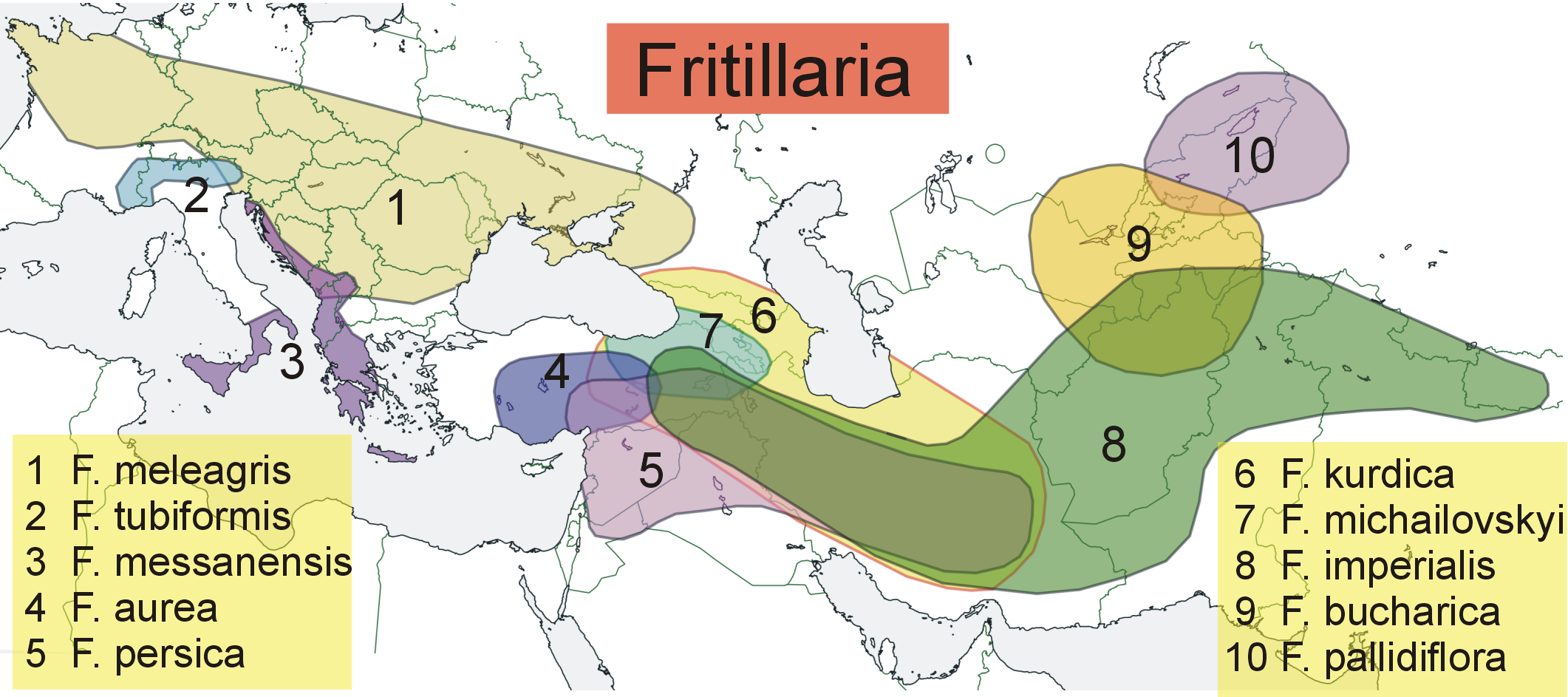
Distribution map of ten Fritillaria species in Europe and western and central Asia

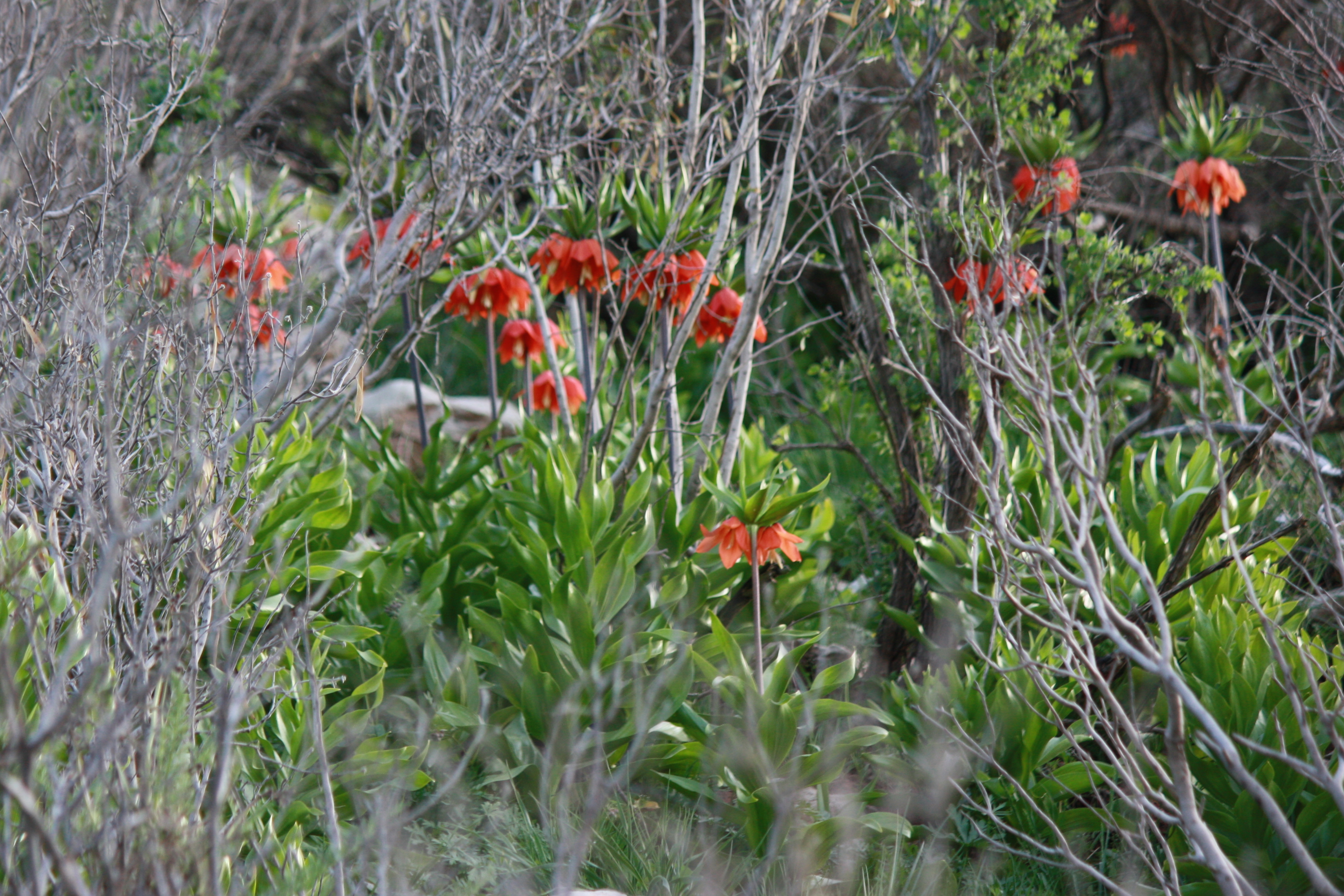
Fritillaria Imperialis in Dena, Iran

Fritillaria are distributed in most temperate zone of the Northern Hemisphere, from western North America, through Europe, the Mediterranean, Middle East and Central Asia to China and Japan. Centres of diversity include Turkey (39 species) and the Zagros Mountains of Iran (14–15 species). Iran is also the centre of diversity of species such as F. imperialis and F. persica. There are five areas of particularly active evolution and clustering of species - California, Mediterranean Greece and Turkey, Anatolia and the Zagros mountains, central Asia from Uzbekistan to western Xinjiang and the eastern Himalayas in southwestern China. Fritillaria species are found in a wide variety of climatic regions and habitats, but about half of them show a preference for full sun in open habitats.

A number of Fritillaria are widely introduced. Cultivated fritillaries (F. meleagris) have been recorded in British gardens since 1578, but only in the wild since 1736, it is likely to be introduced, rather than be endemic. It is greatly diminished there due to loss of habitat, although persistent along the River Thames in Oxfordshire. F. imperialis was introduced into Europe around the 1570s, with Ulisse Aldrovandi sending a drawing to Francesco de' Medici in Florence, famed for his gardens at Villa di Pratolino in 1578. His friend Jacopo Ligozzi (1547–1627) was also including it in his paintings, as well as F. persica. In Britain, F. imperialis was first seen in the London garden of James Nasmyth, surgeon to King James I in April 1605.

== Ecology ==
The majority of species are spring-flowering. Lily beetles (scarlet lily beetle, Lilioceris lilii and Lilioceris chodjaii) feed on fritillaries, and may become a pest where these plants are grown in gardens or commercially.

Fritillaria are entomophilous (insect pollinated). Those species with large nectaries (4–12 x 1–4 mm) and have more fructose than glucose in the nectar are most commonly pollinated by wasps, while those with smaller nectaries (2–10 x 1–2 mm) and a more balanced nectar composition are most commonly pollinated by bumblebees.

== Conservation ==
A number of species of Fritillaria are endangered, from over-harvesting, habitat fragmentation, over-grazing and international demand for herbals. These include many species in Greece, and Fritillaria gentneri in the pacific Northwest of North America. In Japan, five of the eight endemic species (subgenus Japonica) are listed as endangered. In China, the collection of Fritillaria bulbs to make traditional medicine, particularly F. cirrhosa from southwest China and the eastern Himalayas of Bhutan and Nepal and one of the most intensively harvested of the alpine medicinal plants threatens extinction.

In Iran, F. imperialis and F. persica are endangered and F. imperialis is protected. The genus is threatened by irregular grazing, change in pasture usage, pest (primarily Lilioceris chodjaii) migration from pasture destruction, and harvesting by poor people for sale to florists.

One species, F. delavayi, has begun to grow brown, greyish flowers to better camouflage amongst the rock of its habitat. Scientists believe it is evolving to combat its biggest predator—humans. Over-picking has greatly decreased the availability of this species in China and even though there is no known difference between the flowers picked in the wild and those grown commercially, hunters continue to believe the wild flowers offer better medicinal benefit.

== Toxicity ==
Most fritillaries contain poisonous steroidal alkaloids such as imperialin in the bulbs and some may even be deadly if ingested in quantity.

== Uses ==
The bulbs of a few species, such as F. affinis, F. camschatcensis, and F. pudica, are edible if prepared carefully. They were commonly eaten by indigenous peoples of the Pacific Northwest coast of North America. The wild species flowering in areas such as Iran have become important for ecotourism, when in late May people come to the Valley of Roses, near Chelgerd, to see F. imperialis blooming. The area is also rich in F. reuteri and F. gibbosa.

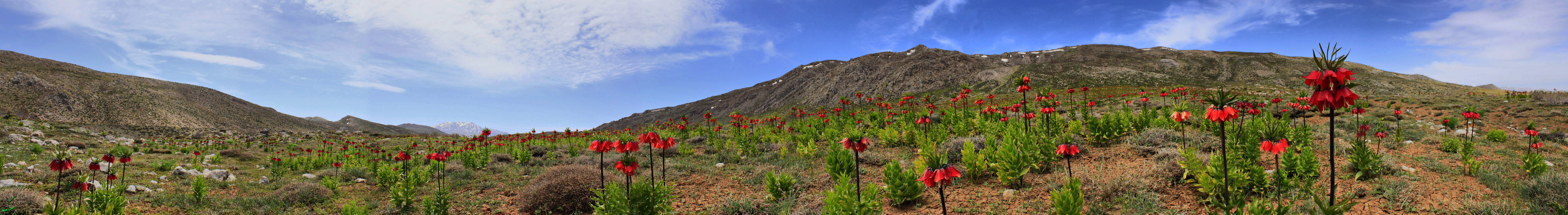
F. imperialis blooming in Sepidan, in the Zagros Mountains, Iran

Because of their large genome size, Fritillaria species are an important source for genomic studies of the processes involved in genome size diversity and evolution. They also have important commercial value both in horticulture and traditional medicine.

=== Horticulture ===
Species of Fritillaria are becoming increasingly popular as ornamental garden plants, and many species and cultivars are commercially available. They are usually grown from dormant bulbs planted in Autumn. As perennials they repeat flower every year, and some species will increase naturally. While Fritillaria is mainly harvested from the wild fields for commercial use, the growing price of the herbal product results in over-exploitation and puts the species at risk of depletion.

The following may be most commonly found in cultivation:-

- Fritillaria acmopetala - pointed-petal fritillary
- Fritillaria imperialis - crown imperial
- Fritillaria meleagris - snake's head fritillary
- Fritillaria pallidiflora - Siberian fritillary
- Fritillaria persica - Persian fritillary
- Fritillaria pyrenaica - Pyrenean fritillary

=== Traditional medicine ===
Species of Fritillaria have been used in traditional medicine in China for over 2,000 years, and are one of the most widely used medicines today. The production of medicines from F. cirrhosa is worth US$400 million per annum. Although some are cultivated for this purpose, most are gathered in the wild. In recent years demand has increased leading to over-harvesting of wild populations. In addition to China, Fritillaria products are used medicinally in the Himalayas, including India, Nepal and Pakistan, as well as Japan, Korea and Southeast Asia. To meet the demand additional countries such as Turkey and Burma are involved in the collection. The products are used mainly as antitussives, expectorants, and antihypertensives. The active ingredients are thought to be isosteroidal and steroidal alkaloid compounds. Chinese sources suggest 16 species as source material, but this may be an overestimate due to the large number of synonyms in Chinese. Of these, 15 are in subgenus Fritillaria (both subclades), but one (F. anhuiensis) is in subgenus Liliorhiza. F. imperialis also has a long history of medicinal usage in China and Iran.

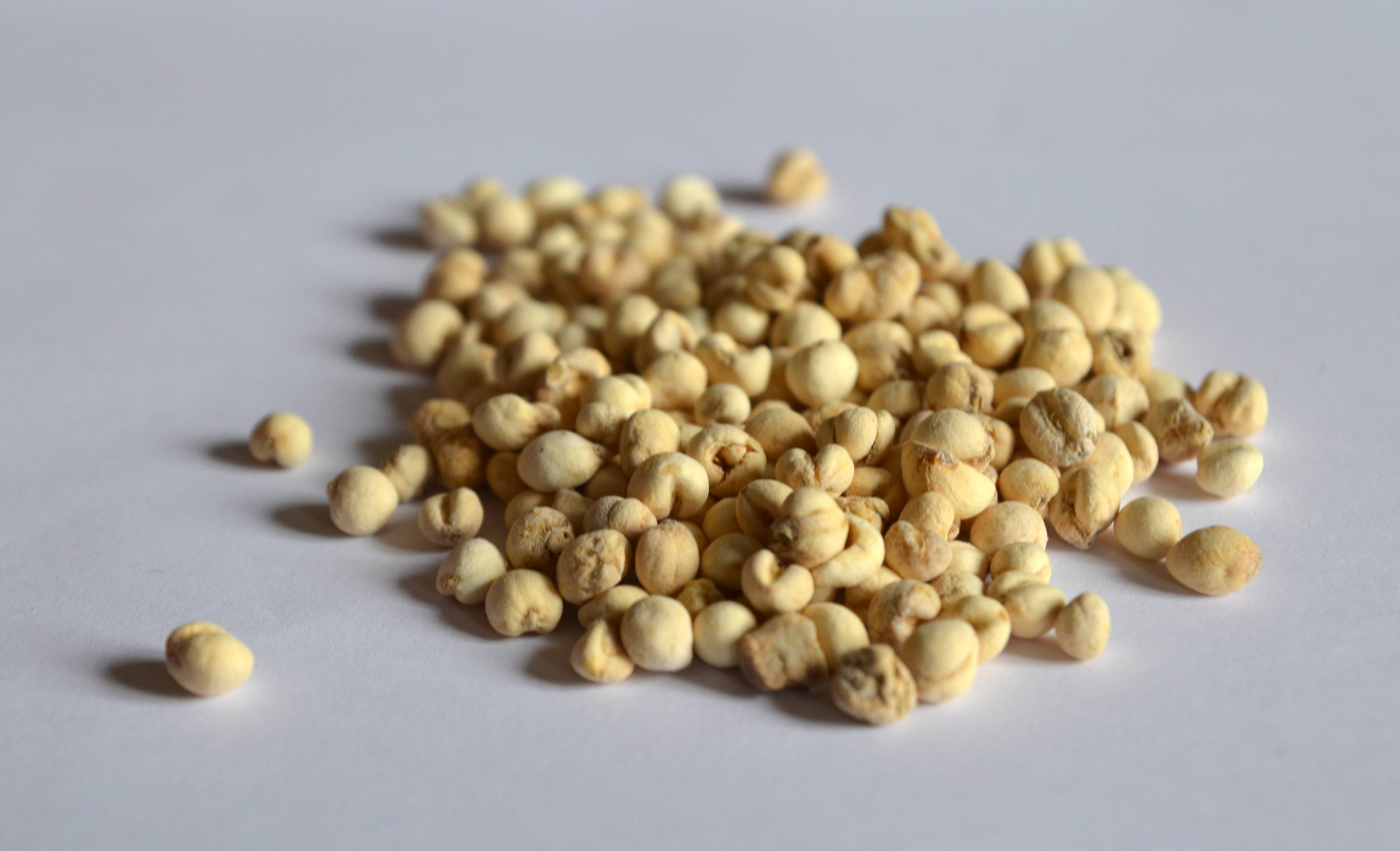
Dried bulbs of F. cirrhosa

Fritillaria extracts (fritillaria in English, bulbus fritillariae cirrhosae in Latin) are used in traditional Chinese medicine under the name chuan bei mu (literally "Shell mother from Sichuan", or just beimu). Species such as F. cirrhosa, F. thunbergii and F. verticillata are used in cough remedies. They are listed as chuān bèi (Chinese: 川貝/川贝) or zhè bèi (Chinese: 浙貝/浙贝), respectively, and are often in formulations combined with extracts of loquat (Eriobotrya japonica). Fritillaria verticillata bulbs are also traded as bèi mǔ or, in Kampō, baimo (Chinese/Kanji: 貝母, Katakana: バイモ). In one study fritillaria reduced airway inflammation by suppressing cytokines, histamines, and other compounds of inflammatory response.

== Popular culture ==
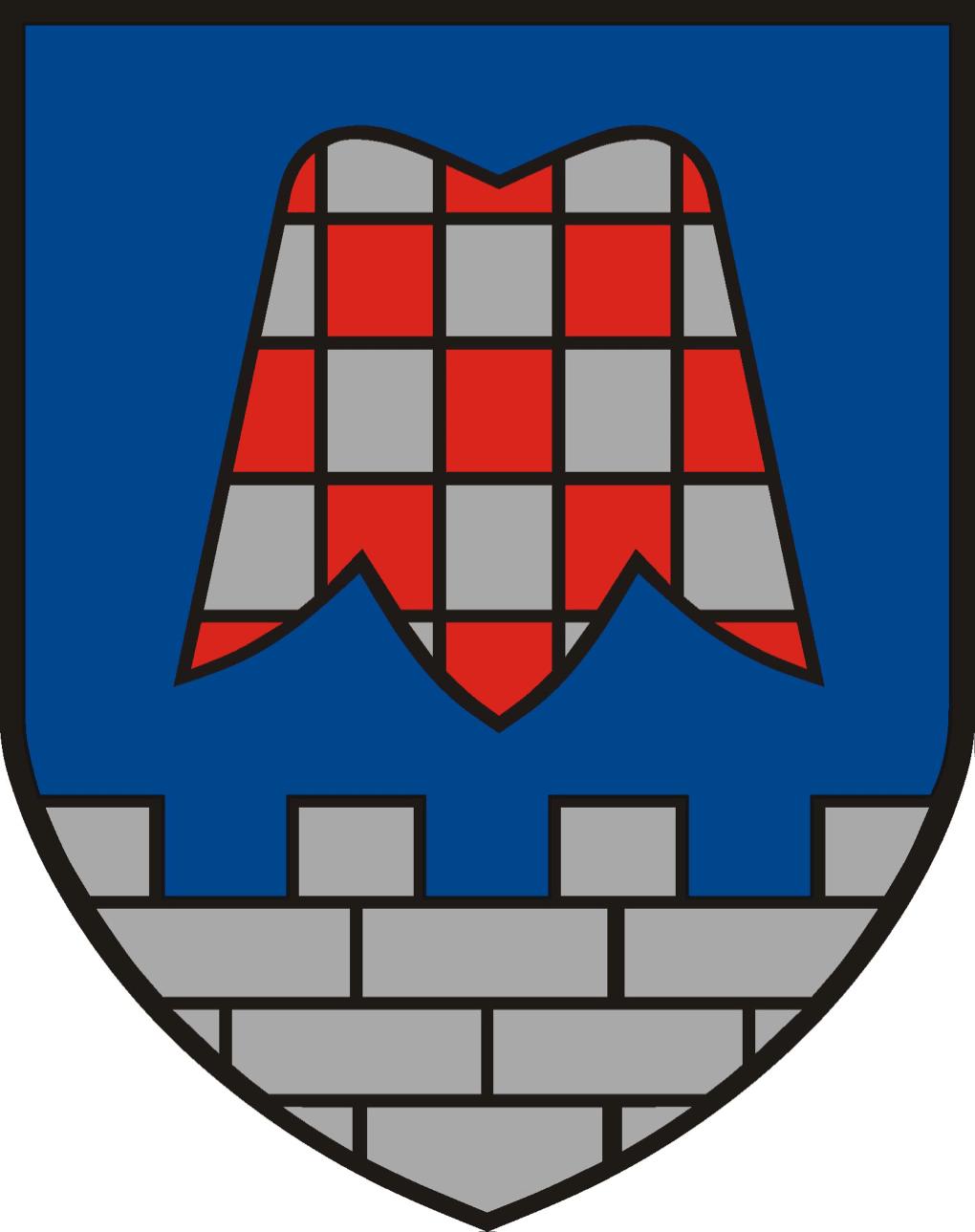
Coat of arms of Großsteinbach, Austria

Shakespeare, Matthew Arnold and George Herbert and more recently Vita Sackville-West (The Land 1927) wrote romantically about fritillaries. Fritillaries were also a favourite of the Dutch flower painters that emerged around 1600, such as Ambrosius Bosschaert and Jacob de Gheyn II, and appeared in Italian art, such as that of Jacopo Ligozzi in the late sixteenth century.

Fritillaries are commonly used as floral emblems. F. meleagris (snake's head fritillary) is the county flower of Oxfordshire, UK, and the provincial flower of Uppland, Sweden, where it is known as kungsängslilja ("Kungsängen lily"). In Germany, F. meleagris appears as a heraldic device in a number of municipalities, such as Hetlingen, Seestermühe and Winseldorf, and also in Austria (Großsteinbach).

In Croatia this species is known as kockavica (from kocka, lit. 'cube'), and the checkerboard pattern of its flowers may have inspired the checkerboard pattern on the nation's coat of arms. F. camschatcensis (Kamchatka fritillary) is the floral emblem of Ishikawa Prefecture and Obihiro City in Japan. Its Japanese name is kuroyuri (クロユリ), meaning "dark lily". Fritillaria montana is the floral emblem of Giardino Botanico Alpino di Pietra Corva, a botanical garden in Italy.

== See also ==
- Taxonomy of Liliaceae
- History of botany

== Bibliography ==
=== Books and theses ===
- Brickell, Christopher, ed. (2016). RHS: A–Z Encyclopedia of garden plants (4th ed.). Dorling Kindersley. ISBN 978-0-241-23912-4.
- Chiang, Nancy (2016). Determination of key aroma active compounds in raw and roasted lily bulbs (bai he) -- an ingredient in chinese cuisine (Thesis). doi:10.7282/T36T0PVQ.
- Da, Hao; Gu, Xiao Jie; Xiao, Pei Gen (2015). Medicinal Plants: Chemistry, Biology and Omics. Elsevier Science. ISBN 978-0-08-100103-5.
- Dahlgren, R.M.; Clifford, H.T.; Yeo, P.F. (1985). The families of the monocotyledons. Berlin: Springer-Verlag. ISBN 978-3-642-64903-5.
- Egmond, Florike (2010). "The Native Flora, the Apothecary and the Nobleman". The World of Carolus Clusius: Natural History in the Making, 1550-1610. Pickering & Chatto. pp. 117–118. ISBN 978-1-317-32421-8.
- Jepson, Willis Linn (1925). A Manual of the Flowering Plants of California. University of California Press. ISBN 978-0-520-00606-5., see also The Jepson Manual
- Kamenetsky, Rina; Okubo, Hiroshi, eds. (2012). Ornamental Geophytes: From Basic Science to Sustainable Production. CRC Press. ISBN 978-1-4398-4924-8.
- Komarov, V. L., ed. (1935). "Korolkowia–Frillaria". Flora of the U.S.S.R. Vol. 4. Leningrad: Botanicheskii institut akademii nauk SSSR. pp. 227–246.
- Kubitzki, Klaus; Huber, Herbert, eds. (1998). The families and genera of vascular plants. Vol. 3. Flowering plants. Monocotyledons: Lilianae (except Orchidaceae). Berlin, Germany: Springer-Verlag. ISBN 978-3-540-64060-8.
- Mabey, Richard (1996). "Fritillary". Flora Britannica. Sinclair-Stevenson. pp. 403–409. ISBN 978-1-85619-377-1.
- Pavord, Anna (1999). The Tulip. London: Bloomsbury Publishing. ISBN 978-0-7475-4296-4.
- Pavord, Anna (2005). The naming of names: the search for order in the world of plants. New York: Bloomsbury Publishing. ISBN 978-1-59691-071-3.
- Raven, Charles E. (1947). English Naturalists from Neckam to Ray: A Study of the Making of the Modern World. Cambridge University Press. p. 162. ISBN 978-1-108-01634-6.
- Rix, E. M. (1971). The taxonomy of the genus Fritillaria in the Eastern Mediterranean region (PhD thesis). Cambridge University.
- Rix, Martyn (2001). Fritillaria: A Revised Classification: Together with an Updated List of Species. Fritillaria Group of the Alpine Garden Society.
- E. M. Rix (1980). "Fritillaria". In Tutin, T. G.; Heywood, V H; Burges, N. A.; Moore, D. M.; Valentine, D. H.; Walters, S. M.; Webb, D. A. (eds.). Flora Europaea. Volume 5, Alismataceae to Orchidaceae (monocotyledones). Cambridge, England: Cambridge University Press. pp. 31–34. ISBN 0-521-20108-X. see also Flora Europaea
- Tang, Weici; Eisenbrand, Gerhard (2013). "Fritillaria spp.". Chinese Drugs of Plant Origin: Chemistry, Pharmacology, and Use in Traditional and Modern Medicine. Springer Science & Business Media. pp. 525–538. ISBN 978-3-642-73739-8.

==== Historical sources (chronological) ====
- Dodoens, Rembert (1574). Purgantium aliarumque eo facientium, tam et radicum, convolvulorum ac deletariarum herbarum historiae libri IIII.... Accessit appendix variarum et quidem rarissimarum nonnullarum stirpium, ac florum quorumdam peregrinorum elegantissimorumque icones omnino novas nec antea editas, singulorumque breves descriptiones continens... [On purgatives] (in Latin). Antwerp: Christophe Plantin.
- l'Obel, Matthias de (1576). Plantarum, seu, Stirpium historia (in Latin). Antwerp: Christophori Plantini.
- l'Obel, Matthias de (1581). Kruydtboeck oft beschry¨uinghe van allerleye ghewassen, kruyderen, hesteren, ende gheboomten (in Dutch). Antwerp: Christoffel Plantyn.
- Clusius, Carolus (1583). "De Fritillaria". Rariorum aliquot stirpium, per Pannoniam, Austriam, & vicinas quasdam provincias observatarum historia, quatuor libris expressa ... . Antwerp: Christophori Plantini. pp. 169–173.
- Dodonaei, Remberti (1583) [1554]. "De meleagride". Stirpium historiae pemptades sex, sive libri XXX [Crvyd-boeck] (in Latin). Antwerp: Plantini. pp. 232–233.
- Gerard, John (1597). "Of Turkie or Ginnie-hen flower". The Herball or Generall Historie of Plantes (1st ed.). London: John Norton. pp. 122–123.
- Parkinson, John (1635) [1629]. "Fritillaria". Paradisi in Sole Paradisus Terrestris, Or A Garden of All Sorts of Pleasant Flowers which Our English Ayre Will Permit to be Noursed Up ... Together with the Right Ordering, Planting, and Preserving of Them; and Their Uses and Vertues. London: Tho. Cotes and are to be sold by Robert Allot. pp. 40–45.
- Bauhin, Johann; Cherler, Johann Heinrich (1651). "Fritillaria". Historia plantarum universalis, nova et absolutissima cum consensu et dissensu circa eas (in Latin). Yverdon. pp. 681–684.
- Tournefort, Joseph Pitton de (1694). "Fritillaria". Éléments de botanique ou methode pour connaître les plantes (Élémens de botanique ou methode pour connoître les plantes) (in French). Paris: Imprimerie Royale. p. 300., trans. as
  - Tournefort, Joseph Pitton de (1719) [1700]. "Fritillaria". Josephi Pitton Tournefort Aquisextiensis, doctoris medici Parisiensis, Academiae regiae scientiarum socii, et in horto regio botanices professoris, Institutiones rei herbariae (in Latin). Vol. I. Paris: Typographia regia. pp. 376–377.
- Linnaeus, Carl (1753). "Fritillaria". Species Plantarum: exhibentes plantas rite cognitas, ad genera relatas, cum differentiis specificis, nominibus trivialibus, synonymis selectis, locis natalibus, secundum systema sexuale digestas. Stockholm: Impensis Laurentii Salvii. pp. 303–304., see also Species Plantarum
- Adanson, Michel (1763). Familles des plantes. Paris: Vincent.
- Jussieu, Antoine Laurent de (1789). Genera Plantarum, secundum ordines naturales disposita juxta methodum in Horto Regio Parisiensi exaratam (in Latin). Paris: apud viduam Herissant et Theophilum Barrois. OCLC 5161409.
- Duby, Jean Étienne (April 1828). "Fritillaria". Botanicon Gallicum; seu, Synopsis plantarum in flora Gallica descriptarum 2 vols. Vol. 1 (2nd ed.). p. 462.
- Yates, James (1859). "Fritillus". In Smith, William (ed.). A Dictionary of Greek and Roman Antiquities (2nd ed.). Boston: Little, Brown, and Company. p. 548.
- Bentham, G.; Hooker, J.D. (1862–1883). "Fritillaria". Genera plantarum ad exemplaria imprimis in herbariis kewensibus servata definita (in Latin). Vol. 3. London: L Reeve & Co. pp. 817–818.
- Boissier, Pierre Edmond (1884). "Fritillaria". Flora Orientalis: sive, Enumeratio plantarum in Oriente a Graecia et Aegypto ad Indiae fines hucusque observatarum. Vol. 5. Geneva: H. Georg. pp. 176–190.
- Franchet, A. (1885). "La botanique en Loire-et-Cher". Flore de Loir-et-Cher. Blois. p. v. ISBN 978-5-88176-800-3.
- Ellacombe, Henry Nicholson (1895). "April". In a Gloucestershire Garden. Edward Arnold. pp. 45–56.

==== Fritillaria in culture ====
- Helden, Albert Van; Dupré, Sven; Gent, Rob van, eds. (2010). The Origins of the Telescope. Amsterdam University Press. ISBN 978-90-6984-615-6.
- Jacobson, Miriam (2014). Barbarous Antiquity: Reorienting the Past in the Poetry of Early Modern England. University of Pennsylvania Press. pp. 117–119. ISBN 978-0-8122-9007-3.
- Scarry, Elaine (2016). Naming Thy Name: Cross Talk in Shakespeare's Sonnets. Farrar, Straus and Giroux. ISBN 978-0-374-71386-7.
- Thomas, Vivian; Faircloth, Nicki (2014). Shakespeare's Plants and Gardens: A Dictionary. Bloomsbury Publishing. ISBN 978-1-4725-5858-9.
- Tomasi, Lucia Tongiorgi; Hirschauer, Gretchen A. (2002). The flowering of Florence: botanical art for the Medici. 3 March-27 May (PDF) (Exhibition catalogue). Washington: National Gallery of Art. ISBN 978-0-85331-857-6.

=== Chapters ===
- Meerow, A.W. (2012-09-17). Taxonomy and Phylogeny: Liliaceae. CRC Press. pp. 17–55. ISBN 978-1-4398-4924-8., in Kamenetsky & Okubo (2012)
- van Berkel, Klaas (2010). The city of Middelburg, cradle of the telescope. Amsterdam University Press. pp. 45–72. ISBN 978-90-6984-615-6., in Helden et al (2010)
- Tamura, M. N. (1998). "Liliaceae". Flowering Plants · Monocotyledons. pp. 343–353. doi:10.1007/978-3-662-03533-7_41. ISBN 978-3-642-08377-8. S2CID 243791987., in Kubitzki & Huber (1998). additional excerpt

=== Articles ===
- Ardakani, Abbas Salahi (2014). "Intensive damage of Lilioceris chodjaii on Fritillaria imperialis in Kohgiluyeh va Boyerahmad province, Iran". Advances in Environmental Biology. 8 (22): 791–795.
- Baker, J. G. (1874). "Revision of the Genera and Species of Tulipeae". Botanical Journal of the Linnean Society. xiv (76). Fritillaria pp. 251–275. doi:10.1111/j.1095-8339.1874.tb00314.x.
- Boom, Florence Hopper (1975). "An Early Flower Piece by Jacques de Gheyn II". Simiolus: Netherlands Quarterly for the History of Art. 8 (4): 195–198. doi:10.2307/3780384. JSTOR 3780384.
- Brown, Mark (19 May 2015). "Shakespeare: writer claims discovery of only portrait made during his lifetime". The Guardian.
- Day, Peter D.; Berger, Madeleine; Hill, Laurence; Fay, Michael F.; Leitch, Andrew R.; Leitch, Ilia J.; Kelly, Laura J. (November 2014). "Evolutionary relationships in the medicinally important genus Fritillaria L. (Liliaceae)". Molecular Phylogenetics and Evolution. 80: 11–19. Bibcode:2014MolPE..80...11D. doi:10.1016/j.ympev.2014.07.024. PMID 25124097.
- Fay, Michael F.; Chase, Mark W. (August 2000). "Modern concepts of Liliaceae with a focus on the relationships of Fritillaria". Curtis's Botanical Magazine. 17 (3): 146–149. doi:10.1111/1467-8748.00258.
- Griffiths, Mark (25 August 2015). "The true face of Shakespeare: Dioscorides and the Fourth Man". Country Life.
- Helsper, Johannes Petrus Franciscus Gerardus; Bücking, Mark; Muresan, Sorel; Blaas, Jan; Wietsma, Willem Anne (July 2006). "Identification of the Volatile Component(s) Causing the Characteristic Foxy Odor in Various Cultivars of Fritillaria imperialis L (Liliaceae)". Journal of Agricultural and Food Chemistry. 54 (14): 5087–5091. Bibcode:2006JAFC...54.5087H. doi:10.1021/jf0605594. PMID 16819920.
- Huang, Jiao; Yang, Li-Qin; Yu, Yan; Liu, Yan-Mei; Xie, Deng-Feng; Li, Juan; He, Xing-Jin; Zhou, Song-Dong (2 August 2018). "Molecular phylogenetics and historical biogeography of the tribe Lilieae (Liliaceae): bi-directional dispersal between biodiversity hotspots in Eurasia". Annals of Botany. 122 (7): 1245–1262. doi:10.1093/aob/mcy138. PMC 6324749. PMID 30084909.
- Kelly, Laura J.; Renny-Byfield, Simon; Pellicer, Jaume; Macas, Jiří; Novák, Petr; Neumann, Pavel; Lysak, Martin A.; Day, Peter D.; Berger, Madeleine; Fay, Michael F.; Nichols, Richard A.; Leitch, Andrew R.; Leitch, Ilia J. (October 2015). "Analysis of the giant genomes of Fritillaria (Liliaceae) indicates that a lack of DNA removal characterizes extreme expansions in genome size". New Phytologist. 208 (2): 596–607. Bibcode:2015NewPh.208..596K. doi:10.1111/nph.13471. PMC 4744688. PMID 26061193.
- Kim, Jung Sung; Hong, Jeong-Ki; Chase, Mark W.; Fay, Michael F.; Kim, Joo-Hwan (May 2013). "Familial relationships of the monocot order Liliales based on a molecular phylogenetic analysis using four plastid loci: matK, rbcL, atpB and atpF-H". Botanical Journal of the Linnean Society. 172 (1): 5–21. doi:10.1111/boj.12039.
- Kim, Jung Sung; Kim, Joo-Hwan; Robinson-Rechavi, Marc (14 June 2013). "Comparative Genome Analysis and Phylogenetic Relationship of Order Liliales Insight from the Complete Plastid Genome Sequences of Two Lilies (Lilium longiflorum and Alstroemeria aurea)". PLoS ONE. 8 (6) e68180. Bibcode:2013PLoSO...868180K. doi:10.1371/journal.pone.0068180. PMC 3688979. PMID 23950788.
- Leitch, I. J.; Beaulieu, JM; Cheung, K; Hanson, L; Lysak, MA; Fay, MF (November 2007). "Punctuated genome size evolution in Liliaceae". Journal of Evolutionary Biology. 20 (6): 2296–308. doi:10.1111/j.1420-9101.2007.01416.x. PMID 17956392. S2CID 25766640.
- McGary, Jane (April 2012). "Fritillaria and the Pacific Garden". Pacific Horticulture. 73 (2). Archived from the original on 1 November 2014.
- Patterson, T. B.; Givnish, T. J. (2002). "Phylogeny, concerted convergence, and phylogenetic niche conservatism in the core Liliales: insights from rbcL and ndhF sequence data" (PDF). Evolution. 56 (2): 233–252. doi:10.1111/j.0014-3820.2002.tb01334.x. PMID 11926492. S2CID 39420833. Archived from the original (PDF) on April 21, 2004.
- Peruzzi, L.; Leitch, I.J.; Caparelli, K.F. (2009). "Chromosome diversity and evolution in Liliaceae". Annals of Botany. 103 (3): 459–475. doi:10.1093/aob/mcn230. PMC 2707325. PMID 19033282.
- Rix, Edward M.; Rast, Dora (February 1975). "Nectar sugars and subgeneric classification in Fritillaria". Biochemical Systematics and Ecology. 2 (3–4): 207–209. Bibcode:1975BioSE...2..207R. doi:10.1016/0305-1978(75)90063-0.
- Rønsted, N.; Law, S.; Thornton, H.; Fay, M. F.; Chase, M. W. (2005). "Molecular phylogenetic evidence for the monophyly of Fritillaria and Lilium (Liliaceae; Liliales) and the infrageneric classification of Fritillaria". Molecular Phylogenetics and Evolution. 35 (3): 509–527. Bibcode:2005MolPE..35..509R. doi:10.1016/j.ympev.2004.12.023. PMID 15878122.
- Türktaş, Mine; Aslay, Meral; Kaya, Erdal; Ertuğrul, Fahriye (2012). "Molecular characterization of phylogenetic relationships in Fritillaria species inferred from chloroplast trnL-trnF sequences". Turkish Journal of Biology. 36: 552–560. doi:10.3906/biy-1201-30.
- Turner, Nancy J.; Kuhnlein, Harriet V. (November 1983). "Camas (Camassia spp.) and riceroot (Fritillaria spp.): two Liliaceous "root" foods of the Northwest Coast Indians". Ecology of Food and Nutrition. 13 (4): 199–219. Bibcode:1983EcoFN..13..199T. doi:10.1080/03670244.1983.9990754.
- Turrill, William Bertram; Sealy, J. Robert (1980). "Studies in the Genus Fritillaria (Liliaceae)". Hooker's Icones Plantarum. 39: 1–2.
- Vinnersten, Annika; Bremer, Kåre (September 2001). "Age and biogeography of major clades in Liliales". American Journal of Botany. 88 (9): 1695–1703. Bibcode:2001AmJB...88.1695V. doi:10.2307/3558415. JSTOR 3558415. PMID 21669704.

==== Regional ====
- Ali, S. I. (2007). "A taxonomic study of the genus Fritillaria L. (Liliaceae) from Pakistan and Kashmir" (PDF). Portugaliae Acta Biol. 22: 221–230.
- Ebrahimie, Esmaeil; Mohammadi-Dehcheshmeh, Manijeh; Sardari, Manoochehr (July 2006). "Fritillaria Species Are at Risk of Extinction in Iran: Study on Effective Factors and Necessity of International Attention". HortScience. 41 (4): 1002B–1002. doi:10.21273/HORTSCI.41.4.1002B.
- Karakaş Meti̇n, Özge; Türktaş, Mine; Aslay, Meral; Kaya, Erdal (2013). "Evaluation of the genetic relationship between Fritillaria species from Turkey's flora using fluorescent-based AFLP". Turkish Journal of Biology. 37: 273–279. doi:10.3906/biy-1207-62.
- Khaniki, Gholamreza Bakhshi; Persson, Karin (December 1997). "Nectary morphology in South West Asian Fritillaria (Liliaceae)". Nordic Journal of Botany. 17 (6): 579–611. Bibcode:1997NorJB..17..579K. doi:10.1111/j.1756-1051.1997.tb00355.x.
- Kiani, Mahmoud; Mohammadi, Shirin; Babaei, Alireza; Sefidkon, Fatemeh; Naghavi, Mohamad Reza; Ranjbar, Mojtaba; Razavi, Seyed Ali; Saeidi, Keramatollah; Jafari, Hadi; Asgari, Davoud; Potter, Daniel (September 2017). "Iran supports a great share of biodiversity and floristic endemism for Fritillaria spp. (Liliaceae): A Review". Plant Diversity. 39 (5): 245–262. Bibcode:2017PlDiv..39..245K. doi:10.1016/j.pld.2017.09.002. PMC 6112302. PMID 30159518.
- Khourang, Mahmoud; Babaei, Alireza; Sefidkon, Fatemeh; Naghavi, Mohamad Reza; Asgari, Davood; Potter, Daniel (December 2014). "Phylogenetic relationship in Fritillaria spp. of Iran inferred from ribosomal ITS and chloroplast trnL-trnF sequence data". Biochemical Systematics and Ecology. 57: 451–457. Bibcode:2014BioSE..57..451K. doi:10.1016/j.bse.2014.10.001.
- Namazi, Fatemeh; Sharifi-Tehrani, Majid; Shabani, Leila (March 2017). "Anatomical study on Fritillaria species in Iran" (PDF). Bangladesh J. Bot. 46 (1): 93–101. Archived from the original (PDF) on 2017-10-18.
- Rix, E. M. (1974). "Notes on Fritillaria (Liliaceae) in the Eastern Mediterranean Region, I & II". Kew Bulletin. 29 (4): 633–654. Bibcode:1974KewBu..29..633R. doi:10.2307/4108130. JSTOR 4108130.
- Sharifi-Tehrani, Majid; Advay, Mahfouz (September 2015). "Assessment of relationships between Iranian Fritillaria (Liliaceae) Species Using Chloroplast trnh-psba Sequences and Morphological Characters". Journal of Genetic Resources. 1 (2). doi:10.22080/JGR.2015.1168.
- Tekşen, Mehtap; Aytaç, Zeki (2011). "The revision of the genus Fritillaria L. (Liliaceae) in the Mediterranean region (Turkey)". Turkish Journal of Botany. 35: 447–478. doi:10.3906/bot-0812-9. S2CID 83989735.
- Wallis, B; Wallis, R (2009). "Fritillaries in Iran". The Plantsman. 8 (3): 184–188.
- Weber, Marjorie G.; Keeler, Kathleen H. (2012-10-18). "The phylogenetic distribution of extrafloral nectaries in plants". Annals of Botany. 111 (6): 1251–1261. doi:10.1093/aob/mcs225. eISSN 1095-8290. PMC 3662505. PMID 23087129.

==== Traditional medicine and pharmacology ====
- Bonyadi, Afsaneh; Mozaffarpur, Seyyedali; Azadbakht, Mohammad; Mojahed, Mortaza (2017). "The Emergence of Fritillaria imperialis in Written References of Traditional Persian Medicine: a Historical Review". Herbal Medicines Journal. 2 (1): 39–42. doi:10.22087/HMJ.V1I2.585.
- Hao, Da-Cheng; Gu, Xiao-Jie; Xiao, Pei-Gen; Peng, Yong (1 July 2013). "Phytochemical and biological research of Fritillaria Medicine Resources". Chinese Journal of Natural Medicines. 11 (4): 330–344. doi:10.1016/S1875-5364(13)60050-3. ISSN 1875-5364. PMID 23845541.
- Wang, Dongdong; Du, Qingdan; Li, Houcong; Wang, Shu (2016). "The Isosteroid Alkaloid Imperialine from Bulbs of Fritillaria cirrhosa Mitigates Pulmonary Functional and Structural Impairment and Suppresses Inflammatory Response in a COPD-Like Rat Model". Mediators of Inflammation. 2016 4192483. doi:10.1155/2016/4192483. PMC 4971319. PMID 27524867.
- Wang, Dongdong; Chen, Xiong; Atanasov, Atanas G.; Yi, Xiao; Wang, Shu (7 August 2017). "Plant Resource Availability of Medicinal Fritillaria Species in Traditional Producing Regions in Qinghai-Tibet Plateau". Frontiers in Pharmacology. 8 502. doi:10.3389/fphar.2017.00502. PMC 5545572. PMID 28824427.
- Yeum, Hyun-Shiek; Lee, Young-Cheol; Kim, Seung-Hyung; Roh, Seong-Soo; Lee, Jang-Cheon; Seo, Young-Bae (March 2007). "Fritillaria cirrhosa, Anemarrhena asphodeloides, Lee-Mo-Tang and Cyclosporine a Inhibit Ovalbumin-Induced Eosinophil Accumulation and Th2-Mediated Bronchial Hyperresponsiveness in a Murine Model of Asthma". Basic & Clinical Pharmacology & Toxicology. 100 (3): 205–213. doi:10.1111/j.1742-7843.2007.00043.x. PMID 17309526.

==== Subgenera ====
- Advay, Mahfouz; Sharifi-Tehrani, Majid (2016). "Taxonomic Relationships of Ten Fritillaria Species of Subgenera Fritillaria and Theresia Based on Analysis of Flower Qualitative and Quantitative Morphological Characters". Journal of Genetic Resources. 2 (1): 10–20. doi:10.22080/jgr.2016.1476.
- Hill, Laurence (2011). "A taxonomic history of Japanese endemic Fritillaria (Liliaceae)". Kew Bulletin. 66 (2): 227–240. Bibcode:2011KewBu..66..227H. doi:10.1007/s12225-011-9285-9. JSTOR 23044676. S2CID 23262059.
- Khaniki, Gholamreza Bakhshi (2003). "Fruit and seed morphology in Iranian species of Fritillaria subgenus Fritillaria (Liliaceae)" (PDF). Pak. J. Bot. 35 (3): 313–322.
- Wietsma, Willem A.; Deinum, Daniël; Teunissen, Hedwich A. S.; van den Berg, Ronald G. (17 August 2014). "Phylogenetic relationships within Fritillaria section Petilium based on AFLP fingerprints". Plant Systematics and Evolution. 301 (3): 1043–1054. doi:10.1007/s00606-014-1135-4. S2CID 17616523.

==== Species ====
- Alp, Şevket; Arslan, Neşet; Koyuncu, Mehmet (2009). "Established forms of Fritillaria imperialis L. - A naturally growing species in Turkey". Pakistan Journal of Botany. 41 (4): 1573–1576. CiteSeerX 10.1.1.576.4986.
- Badfar-Chaleshtori, Sajad; Shiran, Behrouz; Kohgard, Masoomeh; Mommeni, Hassan; Hafizi, Akram; Khodambashi, Mahmood; Mirakhorli, Neda; Sorkheh, Karim (June 2012). "Assessment of genetic diversity and structure of Imperial Crown (Fritillaria imperialis L.) populations in the Zagros region of Iran using AFLP, ISSR and RAPD markers and implications for its conservation". Biochemical Systematics and Ecology. 42: 35–48. Bibcode:2012BioSE..42...35B. doi:10.1016/j.bse.2011.12.027.
- Byfield, Andy (26 April 2013). "A chequered history". The Guardian.
- Peruzzi, Lorenzo; Innangi, Michele; Tatino, Filippo; Santangelo, Annalisa (23 May 2017). "Fritillaria messanensis subsp. gracilis (Liliaceae), a new record for the Italian flora (S Italy)". Phytotaxa. 307 (2): 167. Bibcode:2017Phytx.307..167P. doi:10.11646/phytotaxa.307.2.11.
- Rix, Martyn; Strange, Kit (September 2014). "791. Fritillaria sororum". Curtis's Botanical Magazine. 31 (3): 214–222. doi:10.1111/curt.12075.
- Samaropoulou, Sofia; Bareka, Pepy; Kamari, Georgia (1 December 2016). "Karyomorphometric analysis of Fritillaria montana group in Greece". Comparative Cytogenetics. 10 (4): 679–695. Bibcode:2016ComCy..10..679S. doi:10.3897/CompCytogen.v10i4.10156. PMC 5240518. PMID 28123688.
- Stpiczyńska, M.; Nepi, M.; Zych, M. (3 March 2012). "Secretion and composition of nectar and the structure of perigonal nectaries in Fritillaria meleagris L. (Liliaceae)". Plant Systematics and Evolution. 298 (5): 997–1013. Bibcode:2012PSyEv.298..997S. doi:10.1007/s00606-012-0609-5. S2CID 14113722.
- Zaharof, Eugenia (September 1989). "Karyotype variation of Fritillaria graeca and F. davisii from Greece". Nordic Journal of Botany. 9 (4): 367–373. Bibcode:1989NorJB...9..367Z. doi:10.1111/j.1756-1051.1989.tb01013.x.
- Zhang, De-Quan; Gao, Lian-Ming; Yang, Yong-Ping (April 2010). "Genetic diversity and structure of a traditional Chinese medicinal plant species, Fritillaria cirrhosa (Liliaceae) in southwest China and implications for its conservation". Biochemical Systematics and Ecology. 38 (2): 236–242. Bibcode:2010BioSE..38..236Z. doi:10.1016/j.bse.2009.12.029.

=== Documents ===
- Gisler, Steven D.; Meinke, Robert J. (2003). "Recovery Plan for Fritillaria gentneri (Gentner's fritillary)" (PDF). Portland, Oregon: U.S. Fish and Wildlife Service.

=== Websites ===
- Hill, Laurence (2019). "Fritillaria Icones".
  - Hill, Laurence (2016). "Fritillaria A List of Published Names" (PDF). Fritillaria Icones.
  - Hill, Laurence (2019). "Classification". Fritillaria Icones.
- "Fritillary". Oxford English Dictionary. Oxford University Press. Archived from the original on September 25, 2016.
- Leitch, Andrew. "Fritillaria". Leitch Lab: Plant Evolutionary Genetics and Genomics. Queen Mary College, University of London.
- "Valley of Flowers". Iran. Lonely Planet. 2017.
  - see also Lonely Planet Iran. Lonely Planet. 2017. ISBN 978-1-78657-536-4.
- "Iran: The Zagros Mountains". Natural History Holidays: Middle East. Buxton, UK: Greentours. Archived from the original on 21 October 2017.
- "Rare Japanese plant has largest genome known to science". Science Daily. 7 October 2010.
- Lenz, Erika; Frey, Rebecca (2005). "Fritillaria". Gale Encyclopedia of Alternative Medicine. Encyclopedia.com.
- Capperon, Noel (12 December 1571). "Letter from Capperon, Noël to Clusius, Carolus, 1571-12-12". Clusius Correspondence (Letter). University of Leiden.
- "Fritillaria, keizerskroon, kievitsbloem, soorten". Volkoomen (in Dutch). Archived from the original on 10 November 2017.

Botanic gardens and herbaria

- Botts, Beth (2017). "Fritillaria". Plant information. Chicago Botanic Garden.
- Larkin, Deidre (8 April 2011). "Checkered History". The Medieval Garden Enclosed. The Metropolitan Museum of Art: The Cloisters Museum and Gardens.
- "Fritillaria". Jepson eFlora. Jepson Herbarium, University of California, Berkeley. 2017.
- "Fritillaria (European species)". Cambridge University Botanic Garden.
- "Fritillaria michailovskyi". Plant Finder. Missouri Botanical Garden.
- "Giardino Botanico Alpino di Pietra Corva: Cenni storici". L'orto botanico d'Italia. Società botanica italiana. see also Giardino Botanico Alpino di Pietra Corva

Databases

- "Fritillaria Tourn. ex L." eMonocot. 2014. Archived from the original on 20 August 2019.
- "Fritillaria". Encyclopedia of Life.
- Stevens, P.F. (2017) [2001], Angiosperm Phylogeny Website, Missouri Botanical Garden, see also Angiosperm Phylogeny Website
- TPL (2013). "The Plant List Version 1.1". Royal Botanic Gardens, Kew and Missouri Botanical Garden.
- WCSP. "Fritillaria". World Checklist of Selected Plant Families (WCSP). Royal Botanic Gardens, Kew.
- IPNI (2005). "Fritillaria L." International Plant Names Index.
- IPNI. List of plant names with authority Rix.
- POTWO. "Fritillaria Tourn. ex L." Plants of the World Online. Royal Botanic Gardens, Kew.
- WFO (2019). "Fritillaria L." World Flora Online.

Flora

- Ness, Bryan (2003). "Fritillaria". Flora of North America Volume 26. p. 164.
- Xinqi, Chen; Mordak, Helen V. "Fritillaria". Flora of China. Volume 24. p. 127.

Organisations

- "The Fritillaria Group". Alpine Garden Society.
  - AGS (2011). "Fritillaria". Plant Encyclopaedia. Alpine Garden Society.
- "Fritillaria meleagris". Pacific Bulb Society. 5 May 2015.

Posters

- Day, Peter D; Kelly, Laura J; Berger, Madeleine R; Hill, Laurence; Fay, Michael F; Leitch, Andrew R (2012). "Elucidating evolutionary relationships in Fritillaria (Liliaceae)" (PDF) (poster). Royal Botanic Gardens, Kew, Queen Mary, University of London.
- Ryan, Sean; Simpson, Michael G (2011). "Molecular Phylogenetic Relationships and Character Evolution of Fritillaria subgenus Liliorhiza" (PDF) (poster). San Diego State University.
