= Fritillaria anhuiensis =

Scientific classification
- Kingdom: Plantae
- Clade: Tracheophytes
- Clade: Angiosperms
- Clade: Monocots
- Order: Liliales
- Family: Liliaceae
- Subfamily: Lilioideae
- Tribe: Lilieae
- Genus: Fritillaria
- Species: F. anhuiensis

Binomial name
- Fritillaria anhuiensis S.C. Chen & S.F. Yin in S.F. Yin

Synonyms
- Synonymy: Fritillaria anhuiensis var. albiflora S.C.Chen & S.F.Yin; Fritillaria anhuiensis f. jinzhaiensis Y.K.Yang & J.Z.Shao; Fritillaria ebeiensis G.D.Yu & G.Q.Ji; Fritillaria ebeiensis var. purpurea G.D.Yu & P.Li; Fritillaria hupehensis var. dabieshanensis M.P.Deng & K.Yao; Fritillaria shuchengensis Y.K.Yang, D.Q.Wang & J.Z.Shao; Fritillaria wuyangensis Z.Y.Gao

Species of flowering plant

Fritillaria anhuiensis is a Chinese species of bulb-forming flowering plant in the lily family Liliaceae. It is native to Anhui and Henan Provinces in China.

Fritillaria anhuiensis produces bulbs up to 20 mm in diameter. Stem is up to 50 cm long, supporting usually 1 or 2 flowers but occasionally 3 or 4. Flowers are nodding (hanging downwards), usually yellowish with purple spots but sometimes white or purple.
