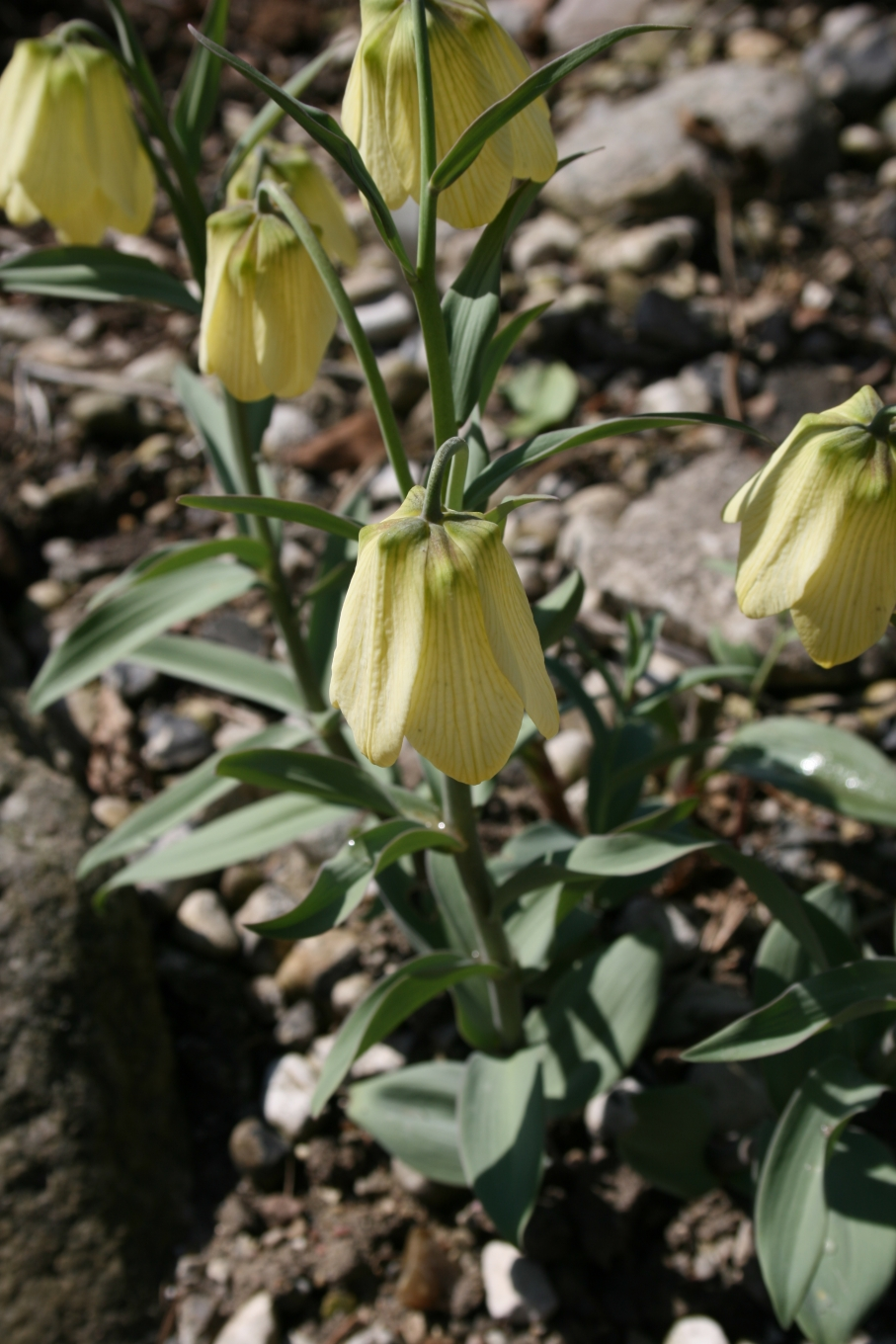

Scientific classification
- Kingdom: Plantae
- Clade: Tracheophytes
- Clade: Angiosperms
- Clade: Monocots
- Order: Liliales
- Family: Liliaceae
- Subfamily: Lilioideae
- Genus: Fritillaria
- Species: F. pallidiflora

Binomial name
- Fritillaria pallidiflora Schrenk

Synonyms
- List of synonyms: Fritillaria bolensis G.Z.Zhang & Y.M.Liu; Fritillaria halabulanica X.Z.Duan & X.J.Zheng; Fritillaria pallidiflora var. halabulanica (X.Z.Duan & X.J.Zheng) G.J.Liu; Fritillaria pallidiflora var. plena X.Z.Duan & X.J.Zheng; Fritillaria pallidiflora var. pluriflora Regel; Fritillaria pallidiflora var. uniflora Regel

= Fritillaria pallidiflora =

Species of flowering plant

Fritillaria pallidiflora is an Asian species of bulbous flowering plant in the lily family Liliaceae, native to Xinjiang, Kyrgyzstan and Kazakhstan. The common name frequently used is Siberian fritillary, a misnomer because the species does not grow in the wild in Siberia.

The Latin specific epithet pallidiflora means "pale flowered".

Fritillaria pallidiflora reaches up to 38 cm (15 in) in height and bears pale yellow, nodding bell-shaped flowers.

In cultivation in the UK this plant has gained the Royal Horticultural Society's Award of Garden Merit. It is hardy down to −15 °C (5 °F)
