= Imperialin =

Names
- IUPAC name 3β,20β-Dihydroxy-5α,17β-cevan-6-one
- Systematic IUPAC name (3S,4aS,6aS,6bS,8aR,9S,9aS,12S,15aS,15bR,16aS,16bR)-3,9-Dihydroxy-9,12,16b-trimethyldocosahydrobenzo[4,5]indeno[1,2-h]pyrido[1,2-b]isoquinolin-5(1H)-one
- Other names Imperialine; Sipeimine; Kashmirine; (3β,5α,17β)-3,20-Dihydroxycevan-6-one

Identifiers
CAS Number	61825-98-7
3D model (JSmol)	Interactive image
ChEMBL	ChEMBL1623724
ChemSpider	391280
PubChem CID	442977
UNII	JKN43410XZ
CompTox Dashboard (EPA)	DTXSID001031589
- InChI: InChI=1S/C27H43NO3/c1-15-4-7-25-27(3,31)21-6-5-17-18(20(21)14-28(25)13-15)11-22-19(17)12-24(30)23-10-16(29)8-9-26(22,23)2/h15-23,25,29,31H,4-14H2,1-3H3/t15-,16-,17+,18+,19-,20-,21+,22-,23+,25-,26+,27-/m0/s1 Key: IQDIERHFZVCNRZ-LRCDAWNTSA-N
- SMILES: C[C@H]1CC[C@H]2[C@@]([C@@H]3CC[C@@H]4[C@H]([C@@H]3CN2C1)C[C@H]5[C@H]4CC(=O)[C@@H]6[C@@]5(CC[C@@H](C6)O)C)(C)O

Properties
Chemical formula	C_{27}H_{43}NO_{3}
Molar mass	429.645 g·mol^{−1}
- Except where otherwise noted, data are given for materials in their standard state (at 25 °C [77 °F], 100 kPa). Infobox references

Imperialin (imperialine or peiminine) is an alkaloid found in the bulbs of species of the genus Fritillaria, where it occurs to the extent of 0.1 - 2.0%. In humans it may cause spasms, vomiting, hypotension and cardiac arrest.

== Management ==
Inducing vomiting and administering activated charcoal. Spasmolytics may be required.
