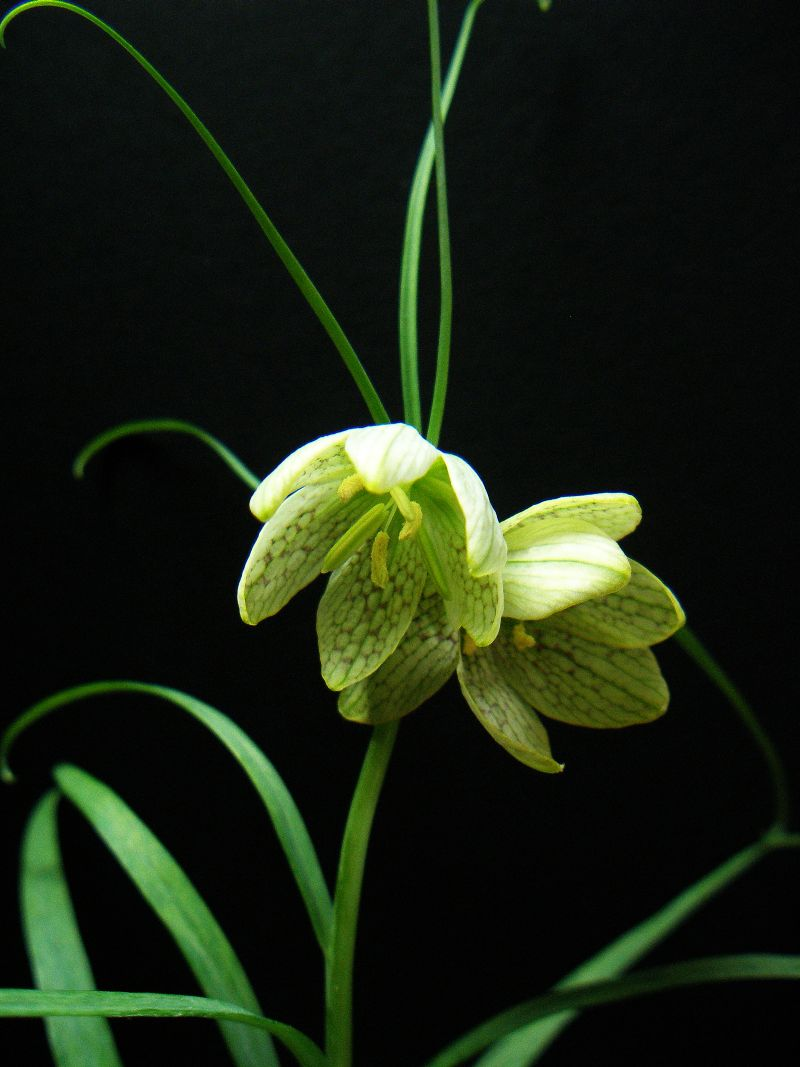

Scientific classification
- Kingdom: Plantae
- Clade: Embryophytes
- Clade: Tracheophytes
- Clade: Spermatophytes
- Clade: Angiosperms
- Clade: Monocots
- Order: Liliales
- Family: Liliaceae
- Subfamily: Lilioideae
- Genus: Fritillaria
- Species: F. verticillata

Binomial name
- Fritillaria verticillata Willd.

Synonyms
- Synonymy: Corona verticillata (Willd.) Fisch. ex Graham; Fritillaria albidiflora X.Z.Duan & X.J.Zheng; Fritillaria albidiflora var. jimunaica (X.Z.Duan & X.J.Zheng) X.Z.Duan & X.J.Zheng; Fritillaria albidiflora var. purpurea X.Z.Duan & X.J.Zheng; Fritillaria albidiflora var. rhodanthera X.Z.Duan & X.J.Zheng; Fritillaria albidiflora var. viridicaulina (X.Z.Duan & X.J.Zheng) X.Z.Duan & X.J.Zheng; Fritillaria altaica Lam. ex Schult. & Schult.f.; Fritillaria amoena Y.C.Yang; Fritillaria borealixingjiangensis Y.K.Yang, S.X.Zhang & G.J.Liu; Fritillaria heboksarensis X.Z.Duan & X.J.Zheng; Fritillaria leucantha Fisch. ex Graham; Fritillaria parvialbiflora var. viridicaulina X.Z.Duan & X.J.Zheng; Fritillaria scandens Fisch. ex Schult. & Schult.f.; Fritillaria tortifolia var. albiflora X.Z.Duan & X.J.Zheng; Fritillaria tortifolia var. citrina X.Z.Duan & X.J.Zheng; Fritillaria tortifolia var. parviflora X.Z.Duan & X.J.Zheng; Fritillaria verticillata var. albidiflora (X.Z.Duan & X.J.Zheng) G.J.Liu; Fritillaria verticillata var. jimunaica X.Z.Duan & X.J.Zheng; Imperialis leucantha Fisch. ex Graham

= Fritillaria verticillata =

Species of flowering plant

Fritillaria verticillata is a flowering plant in the lily family Liliaceae, native to Japan, Korea, Mongolia, Xinjiang, Kazakhstan and the Altay region of Siberia.

It can grow to 60 cm (23.5 in) tall, usually with one flower at the top, but sometimes with as many as five. The leaves are mostly in whorls, with 4-7 leaves per node, each up to 10 cm long but rarely more than 10 mm across. The flowers are pendent, nodding, bell-shaped, white or pale yellow, sometimes with purple spots.

It formerly included the variety Fritillaria verticillata var. thunbergii - now called Fritillaria thunbergii.
