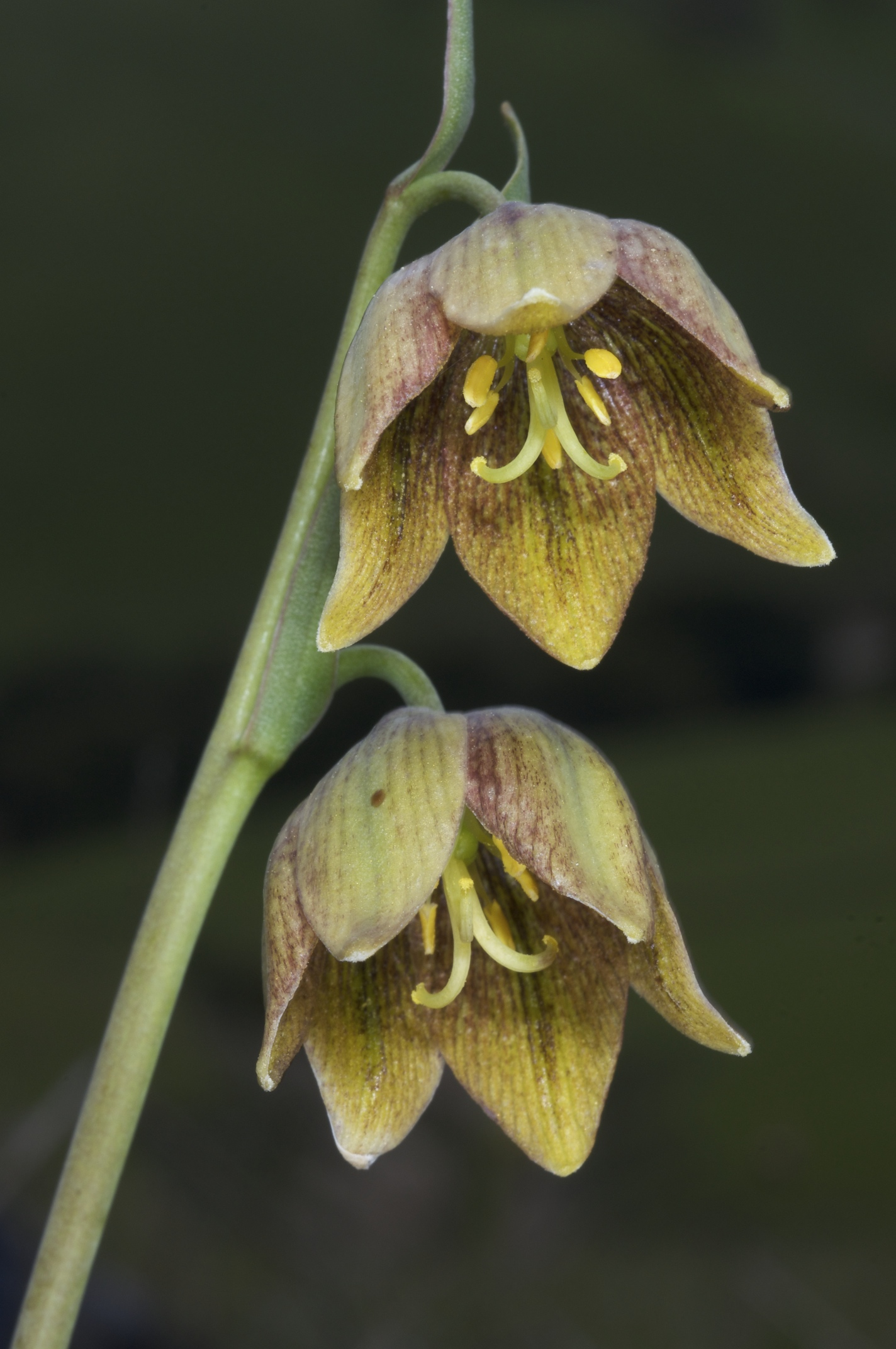

Scientific classification
- Kingdom: Plantae
- Clade: Tracheophytes
- Clade: Angiosperms
- Clade: Monocots
- Order: Liliales
- Family: Liliaceae
- Subfamily: Lilioideae
- Tribe: Lilieae
- Genus: Fritillaria
- Species: F. agrestis

Binomial name
- Fritillaria agrestis (Greene) Greene

Synonyms
- Fritillaria biflora var. agrestis Greene

= Fritillaria agrestis =

Species of flowering plant

Fritillaria agrestis is a species of fritillary known by the common name stinkbells. It is endemic to California, where it is found in scattered populations from Mendocino County and Butte County to Ventura County. It grows in heavy soils, particularly clay. It is not common.

== Description ==
Fritillaria agrestis grows an erect stem reaching about half a meter in height with a clump of 5 to 12 long, narrow leaves clustered around its base. The nodding flower is a cup of six tepals, each one to three centimeters long and sometimes curved at the tips. They are white with greenish to pinkish markings on the outer surface and purple-brown on the inner surface. The nectaries inside the flower are long and prominent. The flower has an unpleasant odor.
