= Fritillaria maximowiczii =

Scientific classification
- Kingdom: Plantae
- Clade: Tracheophytes
- Clade: Angiosperms
- Clade: Monocots
- Order: Liliales
- Family: Liliaceae
- Subfamily: Lilioideae
- Tribe: Lilieae
- Genus: Fritillaria
- Species: F. maximowiczii

Binomial name
- Fritillaria maximowiczii Freyn

Synonyms
- Fritillaria maximowiczii f. flaviflora Q.S.Sun & H.C.Luo

Species of flowering plant

Fritillaria maximowiczii is a plant species known from northeastern China (Hebei, Heilongjiang, Jilin, Liaoning) and eastern Russia (Zabaykalsky Krai, Amur, Khabarovsk, Primorye).

Fritillaria maximowiczii is a bulb-producing perennial up to 60 cm (24 in) tall. Leaves are whorled, linear to lanceolate, up to 10 cm long. Flowers are nodding, reddish-purple with yellow markings.
