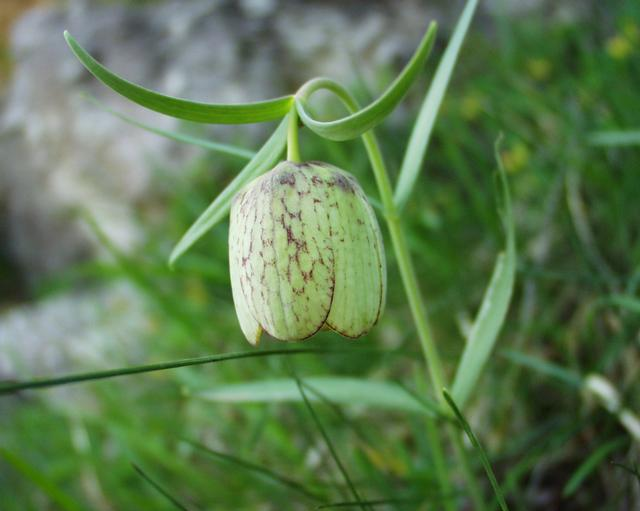

Scientific classification
- Kingdom: Plantae
- Clade: Tracheophytes
- Clade: Angiosperms
- Clade: Monocots
- Order: Liliales
- Family: Liliaceae
- Subfamily: Lilioideae
- Tribe: Lilieae
- Genus: Fritillaria
- Species: F. involucrata

Binomial name
- Fritillaria involucrata All.

Synonyms
- Fritillaria involucrata var. versicolor Baker; Fritillaria involucrata subsp. versicolor (Baker) K.Richt.

= Fritillaria involucrata =

Species of plant

Fritillaria involucrata is a plant species native to the Alps of southeastern France and northwestern Italy.
