= Giardino Botanico Alpino di Pietra Corva =

Botanical garden in Italy

Coordinates: 44°50′N 9°20′E

The Giardino Botanico Alpino di Pietra Corva (3 hectares) is a botanical garden located at 950 meters elevation on the side of Pietra di Corvo mountain, just east of Romagnese, Province of Pavia, Lombardy, Italy. It is open daily except Mondays in the warmer months; an admission fee is charged.

The garden was established by the municipality of Romagnese in 1967 as a reserve for mountain plants from the Alps and around the world. It is now managed directly by the province, and currently contains a small museum plus about 1300 taxa, including Fritillaria tenella (the garden's symbol), Primula rosea, and Sarracenia purpurea. The surrounding forests are primarily beech and oak, with black pine, larch, and spruce.

== See also ==
- List of botanical gardens in Italy
