= Turkish Journal of Biology =

- Discipline: Biology
- Language: English
- Edited by: Prof. Dr. Alaattin ŞEN

Publication details
- Former name: Doğa: Turkish Journal of Biology
- History: 1977-present
- Publisher: TÜBİTAK (Turkey)
- Frequency: Bimonthly
- Open access: Yes
- Impact factor: 0.716 (2019)

Standard abbreviations
- ISO 4: Turk. J. Biol.

Indexing
- CODEN: TJBIEZ
- ISSN: 1300-0152 (print); 1303-6092 (web)
- LCCN: 98648003
- OCLC no.: 60638785

Links
- Journal homepage; Online access; Online archive

The Turkish Journal of Biology is a peer-reviewed scientific journal covering all aspects of biology. It was established in 1977 as Doğa: Turkish Journal of Biology before obtaining its current name in 1994. Since 2001, the journal is published in English, earlier it also contained articles in Turkish. It is published by the Scientific and Technological Research Council of Turkey and the editor-in-chief is Ekrem Gürel (Abant Izzet Baysal University). The journal is indexed by the Science Citation Index Expanded. Its 2019 impact factor is 0.716.
