= List of Fritillaria species =

List of species in the genus Fritillaria

There are about 100 to 130 accepted species names within the genus Fritillaria.

== Alphabetical list of species ==
- Fritillaria acmopetala – Lebanese fritillary - northwest Turkey, Cyprus, Lebanon, Israel
- Fritillaria affinis – checker lily, chocolate lily syn. F. lanceolata - western USA + British Columbia
- Fritillaria agrestis – stinkbells - California
- Fritillaria alburyana - Turkey
- Fritillaria alfredae - Turkey, Syria, Lebanon
- Fritillaria amabilis - Japan
- Fritillaria amana - Turkey
- Fritillaria anhuiensis S.C.Chen & S.F.Yin - China
- Fritillaria ariana - Iran, Afghanistan, Central Asia
- Fritillaria assyriaca - Iran, Iraq, Turkey
- Fritillaria atrolineata - Iran
- Fritillaria atropurpurea – purple fritillary, spotted fritillary, spotted mountainbells, spotted missionbells - western + central USA
- Fritillaria aurea - Turkey
- Fritillaria ayakoana - Honshu in Japan
- Fritillaria baskilensis - Turkey
- Fritillaria biflora – chocolate lily - Baja California, California
- Fritillaria bithynica - Turkey, Aegean Islands
- Fritillaria brandegeei Eastw. - California
- Fritillaria bucharica - Afghanistan, Tajikistan, Uzbekistan
- Fritillaria byfieldii - Denizli Province in Turkey
- Fritillaria camschatcensis – Kamchatka fritillary, rice lily, chocolate lily, Indian rice - Japan, Russian Far East, Alaska, British Columbia, Washington, Oregon
- Fritillaria carica - Turkey, Aegean Islands
- Fritillaria caucasica Adams - Caucasus, Iran, Turkey
- Fritillaria chitralensis - Pakistan, Afghanistan
- Fritillaria chlorantha - Iran
- Fritillaria chlororhabdota - Iran
- Fritillaria cirrhosa D.Don - China, Himalayas, Myanmar
- Fritillaria collina - Caucasus, Turkey
- Fritillaria conica Boiss. - Greece
- Fritillaria crassicaulis S.C.Chen - Sichuan, Yunnan
- Fritillaria crassifolia Boiss. & A. Huet - Iran, Iraq, Turkey, Syria, Lebanon
- Fritillaria dagana Turcz. ex Trautv. - Siberia, Mongolia
- Fritillaria dajinensis S.C.Chen - Sichuan
- Fritillaria davidii Franch. - Sichuan
- Fritillaria davisii Turrill - Greece
- Fritillaria delavayi Franch. - China, Sikkim
- Fritillaria drenovskii Degen & Stoj. - Bulgaria, Greece
- Fritillaria dzhabavae A.P.Khokhr. - Caucasus
- Fritillaria eastwoodiae – Butte County fritillary, Eastwood's ritillary - Oregon, California
- Fritillaria eduardii Regel - Central Asia
- Fritillaria ehrhartii Boiss. & Orph. - Greek Islands
- Fritillaria elwesii - Turkey
- Fritillaria epirotica Turrill ex Rix - Greece
- Fritillaria euboeica Rix - Evvoia (Euboea) Island in Greece
- Fritillaria falcata – talus fritillary - San Benito Co in California
- Fritillaria ferganensis - Kazakhstan, Uzbekistan
- Fritillaria fleischeriana - Turkey
- Fritillaria forbesii - Mugla Province in Turkey
- Fritillaria frankiorum - Turkey, Syria
- Fritillaria fusca Turrill - Tibet
- Fritillaria gentneri – Gentner's fritillary - Oregon
- Fritillaria gibbosa Boiss. - Caucasus, Iran, Afghanistan, Pakistan, Turkmenistan
- Fritillaria glauca – Siskiyou fritillary, Siskiyou missionbells - Oregon, California
- Fritillaria graeca - Albania, Bulgaria, Greece, North Macedonia
- Fritillaria grandiflora Grossh. - Caucasus
- Fritillaria gussichiae (Degen & Dörfl.) Rix - Albania, Bulgaria, Greece, North Macedonia, Serbia
- Fritillaria hermonis - Syria, Lebanon
- Fritillaria imperialis – kaiser's crown, crown imperial - Turkey, Iraq, Iran, Afghanistan, Pakistan, Himalayas
- Fritillaria involucrata All. - France, Italy
- Fritillaria japonica - Honshu in Japan
- Fritillaria kaiensis - Honshu in Japan
- Fritillaria karelinii Fischer ex D.Don - Xinjiang, Central Asia
- Fritillaria kittaniae Sorger - Antalya Province in Turkey
- Fritillaria koidzumiana - Iran
- Fritillaria kotschyana Herb. - Iran
- Fritillaria kurdica Boiss. & Noë - Iran, Iraq, Turkey, Caucasus
- Fritillaria lagodechiana - Caucasus
- Fritillaria latakiensis - Turkey, Syria
- Fritillaria latifolia Willd. - Caucasus, Turkey
- Fritillaria legionensis - Spain
- Fritillaria liliacea – fragrant fritillary - California
- Fritillaria lusitanica Wikstr. - Spain, Portugal
- Fritillaria macedonica Bornm. - Albania, North Macedonia
- Fritillaria macrocarpa - Morocco
- Fritillaria maximowiczii Freyn - Russian Far East, China, Zabaykalsky Krai
- Fritillaria meleagris L. Type species - snake's head fritillary, checkered daffodil, frog-cup, Guinea-hen flower, leper lily, - Eurasia from Britain to Altay Krai
- Fritillaria meleagroides Patrin ex Schult.f. - Eurasia from Bulgaria to Xinjiang
- Fritillaria messanensis Raf. - Greece, Italy, Balkans
- Fritillaria michailovskyi Fomin - Turkey
- Fritillaria micrantha – brown fritillary, brown bells - California
- Fritillaria milasensis - Mugla Province in Turkey
- Fritillaria minima - Turkey
- Fritillaria minuta - Turkey, Iran
- Fritillaria monantha Migo - China
- Fritillaria montana Hoppe - Europe from France to Ukraine
- Fritillaria mughlae - Mugla Province in Turkey
- Fritillaria muraiana - Shikoku in Japan
- Fritillaria mutabilis - Greece
- Fritillaria obliqua Ker Gawl. - Greece
- Fritillaria ojaiensis – Ojai fritillary (sometimes included in F. affinis) - California
- Fritillaria olgae Vved. - Tajikistan, Uzbekistan
- Fritillaria olivieri - Iran
- Fritillaria oranensis - North Africa
- Fritillaria orientalis - Caucasus, Turkey, southern + southeastern Europe
- Fritillaria pallidiflora - Kazakhstan, Kyrgyzstan, Xinjiang
- Fritillaria persica - Middle East
- Fritillaria pinardii - Middle East
- Fritillaria pinetorum – pinewoods fritillary, Davidson's fritillary - California
- Fritillaria pluriflora – adobe lily - California
- Fritillaria pontica Wahlenb. - Albania, Bulgaria, Greece, Turkey
- Fritillaria przewalskii Maxim. - China
- Fritillaria pudica – yellow fritillary, yellowbells - western USA + British Columbia
- Fritillaria purdyi Eastw. - Oregon, California
- Fritillaria pyrenaica - Pyrenees in France + Spain
- Fritillaria raddeana Regel - Turkmenistan, Iran, Kashmir
- Fritillaria recurva – scarlet fritillary - Oregon, California, Nevada
- Fritillaria regelii Losinsk. - Tajikistan
- Fritillaria reuteri - Turkey, Iran
- Fritillaria rhodia A.Hansen - Rodhos (Rhodes) Island in Greece
- Fritillaria rhodocanakis Orph. ex Baker - Idhra Island (Hydra) in Greece
- Fritillaria rixii - Greece
- Fritillaria ruthenica - Belarus, Ukraine, Russia, Kazakhstan
- Fritillaria serpenticola - Eskisehir + Antalya Provinces in Turkey
- Fritillaria sewerzowii Regel - Central Asia
- Fritillaria shikokiana - Shikoku + Kyushu in Japan
- Fritillaria sibthorpiana - Turkey, Symi Island in Greece
- Fritillaria sichuanica S.C.Chen - China
- Fritillaria sinica S.C.Chen - Sichuan
- Fritillaria skorpili Velen. - Bulgaria
- Fritillaria sonnikovae - Krasnoyarsk in Russia
- Fritillaria sororum - Turkey
- Fritillaria spetsiotica - Greece
- Fritillaria stenanthera - Central Asia
- Fritillaria straussii - Turkey, Iran
- Fritillaria striata – striped adobe lily - California
- Fritillaria stribrnyi Velen. - Bulgaria, European Turkey
- Fritillaria taipaiensis P.Y.Li - China
- Fritillaria thunbergii Miq. - Tar Bagatai Mountains in Xinjiang + Kazakhstan
- Fritillaria × tokushimensis - Shikoku in Japan
- Fritillaria tortifolia X.Z.Duan & X.J.Zheng - Xinjiang
- Fritillaria tubiformis Gren. & Godr. - Alps in France + Italy
- Fritillaria unibracteata P.K.Hsiao & K.C.Hsia - China
- Fritillaria ussuriensis - Korea, Primorye, northeastern China
- Fritillaria uva-vulpis - Iran, Iraq, Turkey
- Fritillaria verticillata - Japan, Korea, Mongolia, Xinjiang, Kazakhstan, Altay Krai
- Fritillaria viridea Kellogg - California
- Fritillaria viridiflora - Turkey
- Fritillaria walujewii Regel - Xinjiang, Kazakhstan, Kyrgyzstan
- Fritillaria whittallii - Turkey
- Fritillaria yuminensis X.Z.Duan - Xinjiang
- Fritillaria yuzhongensis G.D.Yu & Y.S.Zhou - China

Formerly included

Numerous names have been coined using the name Fritillaria but referring to species now considered better suited to other genera (Calochortus Disporum Erythronium Eucomis Lilium Notholirion). We provide links to help you find appropriate information.

- Fritillaria autumnalis, now called Eucomis autumnalis
- Fritillaria barbata, now called Calochortus barbatus
- Fritillaria biflora Sessé & Moc 1894 not Lindl. 1834, now called Calochortus barbatus
- Fritillaria cantoniensis, now called Disporum cantoniense
- Fritillaria cuprea, now called Calochortus barbatus
- Fritillaria flavida, now called Lilium nanum var. flavidum
- Fritillaria gardneriana, now called Lilium nanum var. nanum
- Fritillaria hookeri, now called Notholirion macrophyllum
- Fritillaria longifolia Hill 1768 not Steven ex Ledeb. 1852, now called Eucomis autumnalis
- Fritillaria lophophora, now called Lilium lophophorum
- Fritillaria macrophylla, now called Notholirion macrophyllum
- Fritillaria multiscapoidea, now called Erythronium multiscapideum
- Fritillaria nana, now called Eucomis regia
- Fritillaria oxypetala, now called Nomocharis oxypetala
- Fritillaria punctata, now called Eucomis comosa
- Fritillaria purpurea, now called Calochortus purpureus
- Fritillaria regia, now called Eucomis regia
- Fritillaria souliei, now called Lilium souliei
- Fritillaria stracheyi, now called Lilium nanum
- Fritillaria thomsoniana, now called Notholirion thomsonianum

== Subgenera ==
The species of Fritillaria are divided amongst eight subgenera. A partial list (Note: Complete list, with exception of Rhinopetalum, Liliorhiza and Fritillaria which are at least 60% complete) of species by subgenera is shown here:

=== Fritillaria ===
- F. acmopetala Boiss.
- F. alburyana Rix
- F. alfredae Post
- F. amana (Rix) R.Wallis & R.B.Wallis
- F. assyriaca Baker
- F. aurea Schott
- F. bithynica Baker
- F. carica Rix
- F. caucasica Adam
- F. cirrhosa D. Don
- F. conica Boiss.
- F. crassifolia Boiss & Huet.
- F. davisii Turrill
- F. drenovskii Degen & Stoj.
- F. ehrhartii Boiss. & Orph.
- F. elwesii Boiss.
- F. fleischeriana Steud. & Hochst. ex Schult.f.
- F. forbesii Baker
- F. frankiorum R.Wallis & R.B.Wallis
- F. graeca Boissier & Spruner
- F. gussichiae (Degen & Dorfler) Rix
- F. hermonis Fenzl
- F. involucrata Allioni
- F. kotschyana Herbert
- F. latakiensis Rix
- F. latifolia Willd.
- F. lusitanica Wikstr.
- F. meleagris L.
- F. meleagroides Patrin ex Schult.f
- F. messanensis Rafin
- F. michailovskyi Fomin
- F. minuta Boiss. & Nöe
- F. montana Hoppe ex W. D. J. Koch
- F. mutabilis Kamari
- F. obliqua Ker Gawl.
- F. olivieri Baker
- F. oranensis Pomel
- F. orientalis Adam
- F. pallidiflora Schrenk
- F. pinardii Boiss.
- F. poluninii (Rix) G.Bakhshi Khaniki & K.Persson
- F. pontica Wahlenb.
- F. pyrenaica L
- F. reuteri Boiss.
- F. rixii Zaharof
- F. ruthenica Wikstr.
- F. sibthorpiana Baker
- F. sororum Jimmy Persson & K.Persson
- F. stribrnyi Velen.
- F. tenella M.Bieb.
- F. theophrasti Kamari & Phitos
- F. thessala (Boiss.) Kamari
- F. thunbergii Miq.
- F. tortifolia X.Z.Duan & X.J.Zheng
- F. tubiformis Gren. & Godr.
- F. usuriensis Maxim.
- F. uva-vulpis Rix
- F. verticillata Willd.
- F. walujewii Regel
- F. whittallii Baker
- F. zagrica Stapf

=== Rhinopetalum Fisch. ===
5 species

- F. ariana (Loz.-Lozinsk. & Vved.) E.M.Rix
- F. bucharica Regel
- F. gibbosa Boiss.
- F. karelini (Fisher ex D.Don) Baker
- F. stenanthera Regel

=== Theresia Koch ===
Monotypic

- F. persica L.

=== Petilium (L.) Endl. ===
4 species

- F. chitraensis B. Mathew
- F. eduardii Regel
- F. imperialis L.
- F. raddeana Regel

=== Liliorhiza (Kellog) Benth. & Hook.f. ===
- F. affinis (Schult.) Sealy
- F. agrestis Greene
- F. atropurpurea Nutt.
- F. camschatcensis (L.). Ker-Gawl.
- F. dagana Turcz.
- F. eastwoodae Macfarl.
- F. falcata (Jepson) Beetle
- F. gentneri Gilkey
- F. glauca Greene
- F. liliacea Lindl.
- F. maximowiczii Freyn.
- F. micrantha Heller
- F. phaeanthera Purdy
- F. pluriflora Torr. ex Benth.
- F. pudica (Pursh) Spreng.
- F. recurva Benth.
- F. striata Eastw.

=== Korolkowia Rix ===
Monotypic

- F. sewerzowii Regel

=== Davidii Rix ===
Monotypic

- F. davidii Franchet

=== Japonica Rix ===
8 species

- F. amabilis Koidzumi
- F. ayakoana I.Maruyama & N. Naruhashi
- F. japonica Miq.
- F. kaiensis N.Naruhashi
- F. koidzumiana Ohwi
- F. muraiana Ohwi
- F. shikokiana N. Narushi
- F. tokushimensis Akasawa, Katayama & T.Naito

== Bibliography ==
- Day, Peter D.; Berger, Madeleine; Hill, Laurence; Fay, Michael F.; Leitch, Andrew R.; Leitch, Ilia J.; Kelly, Laura J. (November 2014). "Evolutionary relationships in the medicinally important genus Fritillaria L. (Liliaceae)". Molecular Phylogenetics and Evolution. 80: 11–19. doi:10.1016/j.ympev.2014.07.024. PMID 25124097.
- Rønsted, N.; Law, S.; Thornton, H.; Fay, M. F.; Chase, M. W. (2005). "Molecular phylogenetic evidence for the monophyly of Fritillaria and Lilium (Liliaceae; Liliales) and the infrageneric classification of Fritillaria". Molecular Phylogenetics and Evolution. 35 (3): 509–527. doi:10.1016/j.ympev.2004.12.023. PMID 15878122.
- "Fritillaria meleagris". Pacific Bulb Society. 5 May 2015.
- "Fritillaria michailovskyi". Plant Finder. Missouri Botanical Garden.
- Ness, Bryan (2003). "Fritillaria". Flora of North America Volume 26. p. 164.
- Xinqi, Chen; Mordak, Helen V. "Fritillaria". Flora of China. Volume 24. p. 127.
- WCSP. "Fritillaria". World Checklist of Selected Plant Families (WCSP). Royal Botanic Gardens, Kew.
