= Calochortus fuscus =

Scientific classification
- Kingdom: Plantae
- Clade: Tracheophytes
- Clade: Angiosperms
- Clade: Monocots
- Order: Liliales
- Family: Liliaceae
- Genus: Calochortus
- Species: C. fuscus

Binomial name
- Calochortus fuscus Schult.f.

Synonyms
- Calochortus hintonii Bullock ex Ownbey; Cyclobothra fusca (Schult.f.) Lindl.

Species of flowering plant

Calochortus fuscus is a bulbous plant in the lily family native to Mexico. It is sometimes known by the common name Hinton's cyclobothra and belongs to subsection Ghiesbreghtiani within section Cyclobothra in the genus Calochortus. It occurs in the mountainous regions of the Mexican Plateau.

== Description ==
Calochortus fuscus is a bulbous perennial plant with small, dark-red flowers. Its upright glaucous stem, 30–60 cm in height, bears a basal leaf 20–20 cm in length, as well as cauline leaves, bracts, and two to four blooms. The flowers are erect and shallowly bowl-shaped or nearly flat, around 2–2.5 cm across. The sepals are pointed and slightly shorter than the petals, although the two floral whorls are much closer in size compared to other Calochortus species. The petals are slightly pointed to nearly truncate with smooth or slightly toothed margins. Each petal bears a nectary gland surrounded by a sparse to dense dusting of cream-yellow trichomes. The petals themselves, as well as the sepals, are dark red. The anthers are reddish and oblong in shape. Calochortus fuscus blooms in the late summer and early autumn from mid-August through September. Populations at higher elevations flower later.

Like other members of section Cyclobothra, C. fuscus forms thick and coarsely hairy bulb coats appearing like a fibrous net. It also lacks bulbils in its leaf axils, which is characteristic of members of subsection Ghiesbreghtiani.

== Distribution and habitat ==
Calochortus fuscus occurs in the Mexican states of Chihuahua, Jalisco, Mexico, Michoacán, and Oaxaca. It prefers volcanic soils and gros in oak and pine forests at elevations of 900–2300 m. It experiences cool, dry winters and rainy summers.

== Taxonomy and naming ==
Calochortus fuscus was first collected in central Mexico by Alexander von Humboldt and subsequently described under the genus Fritillaria in 1816, along with a different Calochortus species, C. barbatus. In 1828, David Don transferred the latter species, then known as Fritillaria barbata, to a new genus named Cyclobothra. Subsequently, both species were transferred by Julius Hermann Schultes to Calochortus. In a 1911 paper on section Cyclobothra, Joseph H. Painter labeled C. fuscus as a species inquirenda, meaning it was of doubtful identity, as Painter could not match any species with the original description. Further taxonomic confusion occurred when Marion Ownbey conflated C. fuscus with a different species,C. spatulatus, and described the former under a new name, C. hintonii, in 1940. Later, in 1963, Ownbey synonymized C. hintonii with the earlier-described C. fuscus upon realizing the two entities were the same.

== Cultivation ==
Calochortus fuscus is rare in cultivation. Based on its habitat, its care likely requires a well-drained medium watered in the summer and kept cool and dry during winter dormancy, similar to other Mexican Calochortus.
