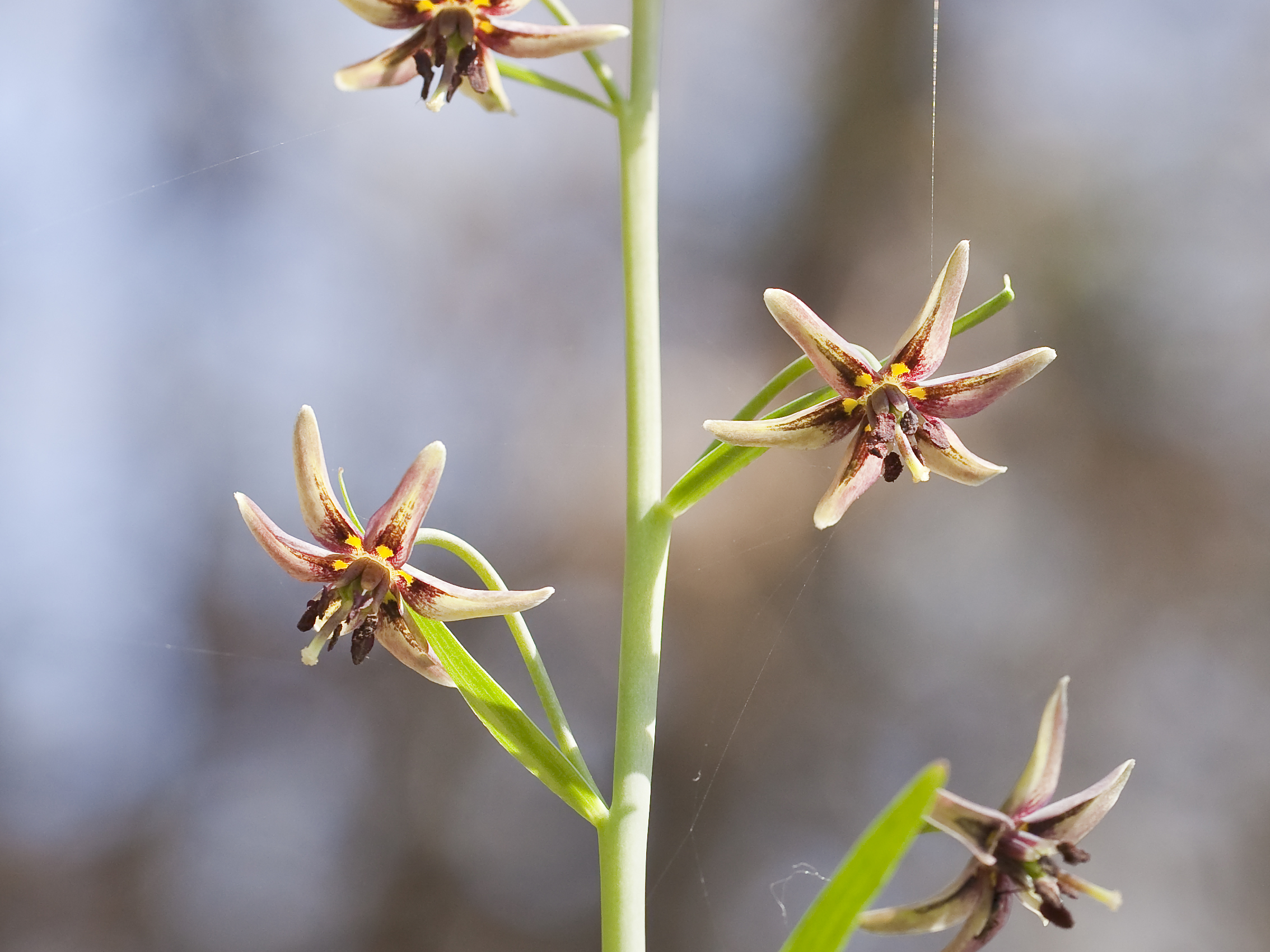

Conservation status
- Imperiled (NatureServe)

Scientific classification
- Kingdom: Plantae
- Clade: Tracheophytes
- Clade: Angiosperms
- Clade: Monocots
- Order: Liliales
- Family: Liliaceae
- Subfamily: Lilioideae
- Tribe: Lilieae
- Genus: Fritillaria
- Species: F. brandegeei

Binomial name
- Fritillaria brandegeei Eastw.

Synonyms
- Fritillaria hutchinsonii Davidson

= Fritillaria brandegeei =

Species of flowering plant

Fritillaria brandegeei, the Greenhorn fritillary, is a plant species endemic to California, USA.

== Description ==
Fritillaria brandegeei is a bulb-forming perennial up to 100 cm tall. Leaves are in 1-2 whorls of 4-8 leaves per node. Flowers are nodding, pinkish purple.

== Distribution ==
It is known from only the Greenhorn Mountains, a subrange of the southern Sierra Nevada, within Kern and Tulare counties. It grows in open areas of yellow pine forest habitats, at elevations of 1,500–2,100 metres (4,900–6,900 ft).
