= Fritillaria sororum =

Scientific classification
- Kingdom: Plantae
- Clade: Tracheophytes
- Clade: Angiosperms
- Clade: Monocots
- Order: Liliales
- Family: Liliaceae
- Subfamily: Lilioideae
- Tribe: Lilieae
- Genus: Fritillaria
- Species: F. sororum

Binomial name
- Fritillaria sororum Jim.Persson & K.Persson

Species of flowering plant

Fritillaria sororum is a species of bulb-forming flowering plant in the lily family Liliaceae, found only in the Taurus Mountains of southern Turkey.

Some authorities consider this the same species as Fritillaria acmopetala.
