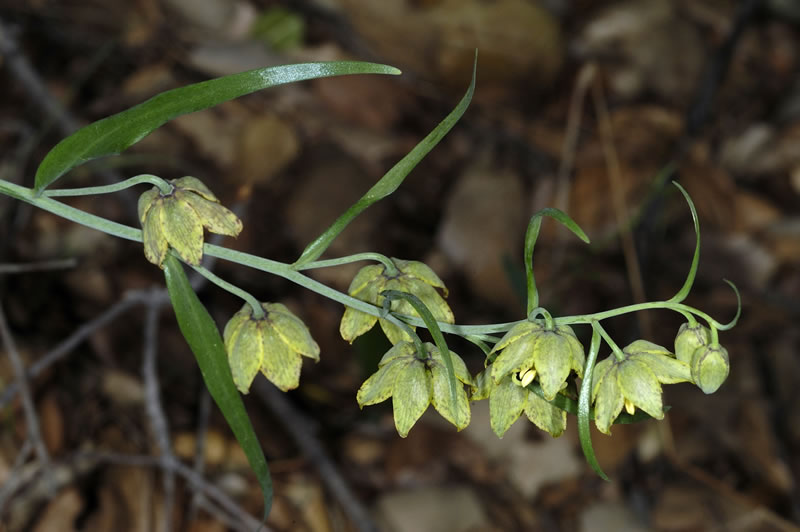

Conservation status
- Vulnerable (NatureServe)

Scientific classification
- Kingdom: Plantae
- Clade: Tracheophytes
- Clade: Angiosperms
- Clade: Monocots
- Order: Liliales
- Family: Liliaceae
- Subfamily: Lilioideae
- Genus: Fritillaria
- Species: F. ojaiensis

Binomial name
- Fritillaria ojaiensis Davidson

= Fritillaria ojaiensis =

Plant species in the lily family

Fritillaria ojaiensis is a rare species of fritillary known by the common name Ojai fritillary.

This wildflower is endemic to California, USA, with a discontinuous distribution in northwestern and west-central parts of the state. It occurs in the western Transverse Ranges of Monterey, San Luis Obispo, Santa Barbara, and Ventura Counties, including the Santa Ynez Mountains, and the southern Santa Lucia Mountains. Additional populations have been found along the coast of Mendocino County approximately 400 miles to the north.

The plant is named for the City of Ojai in Ventura County.

== Description ==
Fritillaria ojaiensis produces an erect stem reaching maximum heights near 0.5 metres (1.6 ft). The long, straight, very narrow leaves grow in whorls on the lower stem and in pairs near the top.

Flowers are produced at intervals. Each pendent, nodding flower has six tepals one to three centimeters long and is greenish yellow to purple in color with purple mottling. At the center is a large nectary surrounded by stamens with large yellow anthers.

== Taxonomy ==
Fritillaria ojaiensis was first scientifically described and named by Anstruther Davidson in 1922. It is part of the Fritillaria genus which is classified in the Liliaceae family. The species is quite similar to Fritillaria affinis and is sometimes considered the same species. The species has no synonyms.
