= Fritillaria przewalskii =

Scientific classification
- Kingdom: Plantae
- Clade: Tracheophytes
- Clade: Angiosperms
- Clade: Monocots
- Order: Liliales
- Family: Liliaceae
- Subfamily: Lilioideae
- Tribe: Lilieae
- Genus: Fritillaria
- Species: F. przewalskii

Binomial name
- Fritillaria przewalskii Maxim. ex Batalin 1893

Synonyms
- Synonymy: Fritillaria gansuensis S.C.Chen & G.D.Yu; Fritillaria przewalskii var. discolor Y.K.Yang & Y.S.Zhou; Fritillaria przewalskii f. emacula Y.K.Yang & J.K.Wu; Fritillaria przewalskii var. tessellata Y.K.Yang & Y.S.Zhou; Fritillaria przewalskii var. gannanica Y.K.Yang & J.Z.Ren

Species of flowering plant

Fritillaria przewalskii is a Chinese flowering plant species in the lily family Liliaceae. It is found only in China, in the Provinces of Gansu, Qinghai and Sichuan.

It produces bulbs up to 15 mm in diameter. The stem is up to 50 cm tall, with pendent, nodding flowers which are yellow with deep purple spots.

The species is named for Polish-Russian explorer Colonel Nikolai Przhevalsky, 1839–1888.

formerly included

- Fritillaria przewalskii var. longistigma Y.K.Yang & J.K.Wu, now called Fritillaria sichuanica S.C.Chen
