= Fritillaria fusca =

Scientific classification
- Kingdom: Plantae
- Clade: Tracheophytes
- Clade: Angiosperms
- Clade: Monocots
- Order: Liliales
- Family: Liliaceae
- Subfamily: Lilioideae
- Tribe: Lilieae
- Genus: Fritillaria
- Species: F. fusca

Binomial name
- Fritillaria fusca Turrill

Synonyms
- Fritillaria himalaica Y.K.Yang & al.

Species of flowering plant

Fritillaria fusca is an Asian species of herbaceous plant in the lily family Liliaceae, native to Tibet in China.

Fritillaria fusca is up to 22 cm tall. There is usually only one flower, bell-shaped, yellowish with purplish-brown markings.
