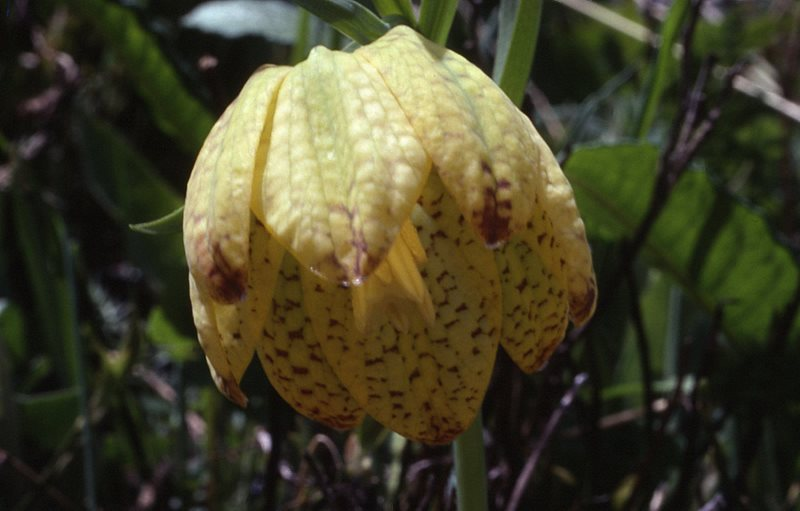
- Fritillaria tubiformis var. moggridgei,

Scientific classification
- Kingdom: Plantae
- Clade: Tracheophytes
- Clade: Angiosperms
- Clade: Monocots
- Order: Liliales
- Family: Liliaceae
- Subfamily: Lilioideae
- Tribe: Lilieae
- Genus: Fritillaria
- Species: F. tubiformis

Binomial name
- Fritillaria tubiformis Gren. & Godr

Synonyms
- Fritillaria tubaeformis, misspelling; Fritillaria delphinensis Gren.; Fritillaria tubiformis var. delphinensis (Gren.) Rouy

= Fritillaria tubiformis =

Species of flowering plant

Fritillaria tubiformis is a bulbous perennial plant in the lily family Liliaceae, native to Alpine regions of southeastern France and northern Italy.

Subspecies

- Fritillaria tubiformis var. burnatii (Planch.) Rouy
- Fritillaria tubiformis subsp. moggridgei (Boiss. & Reut. ex Planch.) Rix
- Fritillaria tubiformis subsp. tubiformis
