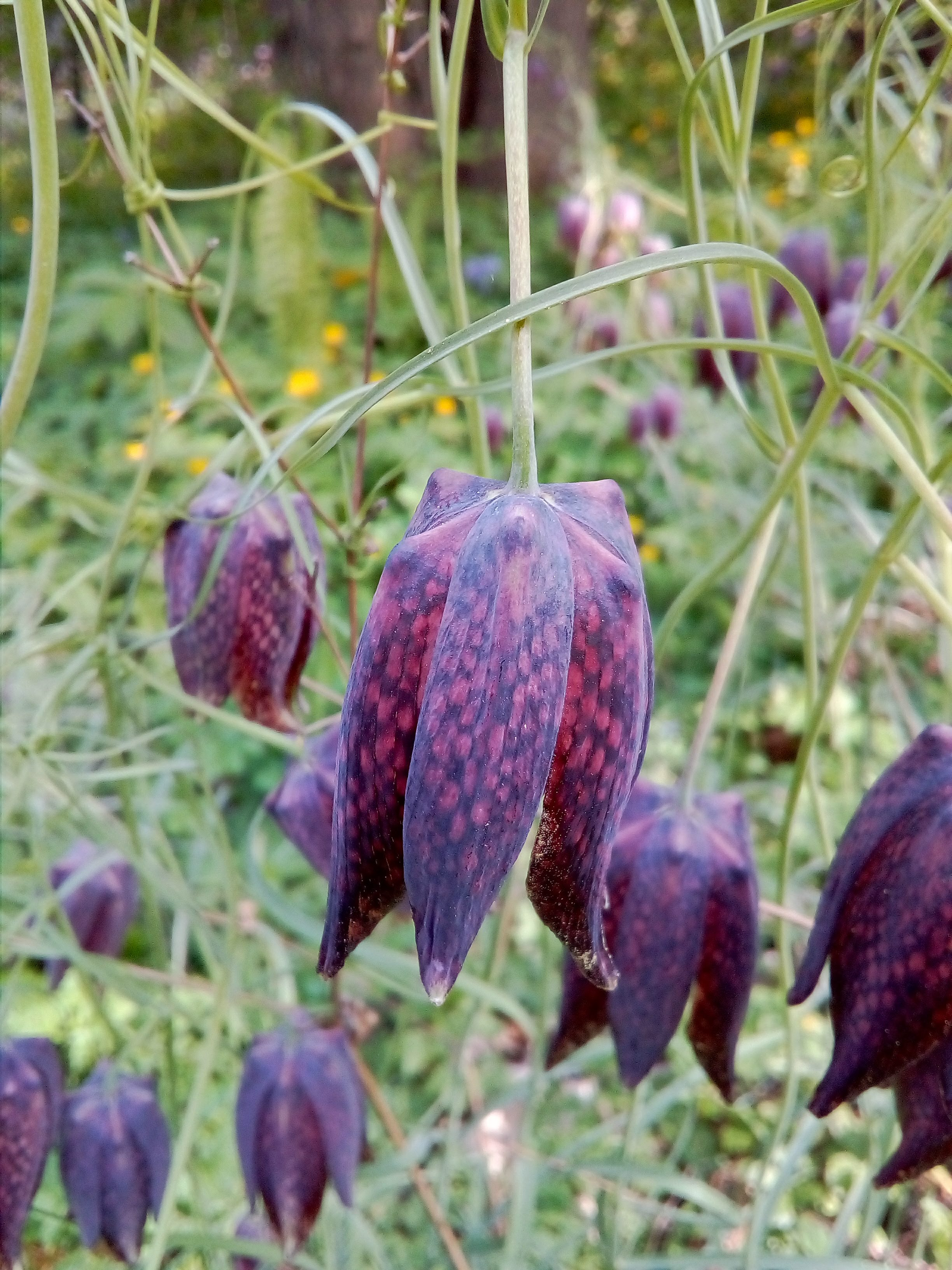

Scientific classification
- Kingdom: Plantae
- Clade: Tracheophytes
- Clade: Angiosperms
- Clade: Monocots
- Order: Liliales
- Family: Liliaceae
- Subfamily: Lilioideae
- Tribe: Lilieae
- Genus: Fritillaria
- Species: F. ussuriensis

Binomial name
- Fritillaria ussuriensis Maxim.

Synonyms
- Fritillaria usuriensis, alternate spelling, e.g. in World Checklist and IPNI

= Fritillaria ussuriensis =

Species of flowering plant

Fritillaria ussuriensis is a species of flowering plant in the lily family Liliaceae, native to Korea, the Primorye Region of Russia, and northeastern China (Heilongjiang, Jilin, Liaoning).

It is a bulb-forming perennial up to 100 cm (39 in) tall. The flowers are pendent, nodding, bell-shaped, brownish-purple with yellowish markings.
