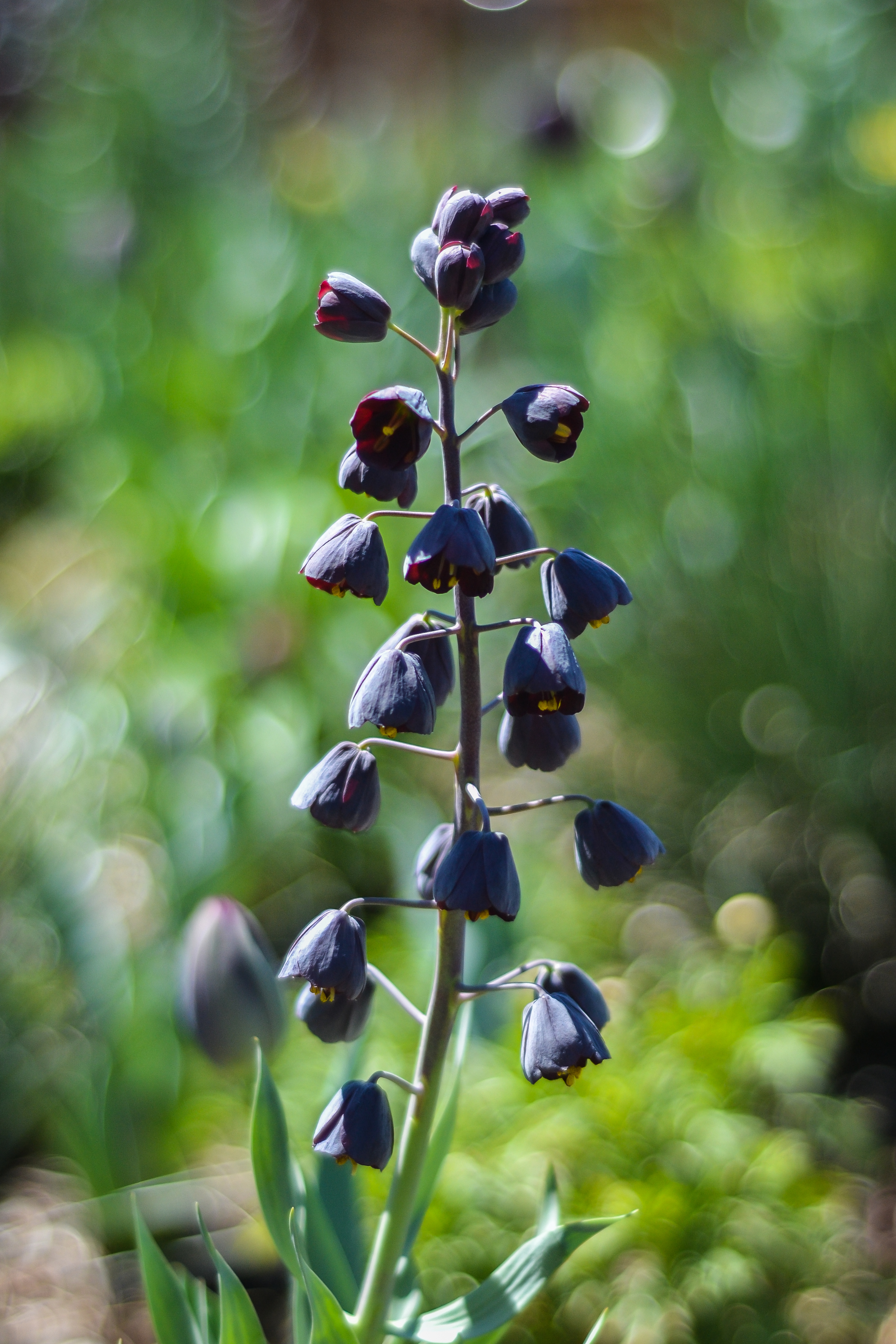
- Inflorescence

Scientific classification
- Kingdom: Plantae
- Clade: Tracheophytes
- Clade: Angiosperms
- Clade: Monocots
- Order: Liliales
- Family: Liliaceae
- Subfamily: Lilioideae
- Genus: Fritillaria
- Species: F. persica

Binomial name
- Fritillaria persica L.

Synonyms
- Synonymy: Fritillaria arabica Gand.; Fritillaria eggeri Bornm.; Fritillaria libanotica (Boiss.) Baker; Fritillaria nobilis Salisb.; Theresia libanotica Boiss.; Theresia persica (L.) K.Koch; Tozzettia persica (L.) Parl.

= Fritillaria persica =

Species of flowering plant

Fritillaria persica is a Middle Eastern species of flowering plant in the lily family Liliaceae, native to southern Turkey, Iran, Iraq, Lebanon, Syria, Cyprus and Israel. It is widely cultivated as an ornamental and naturalized in the Lazio region of Italy. It is the sole species in Fritillaria subgenus Theresia.

The Latin specific epithet persica means "Persian", referring to the modern country of Iran.

Fritillaria persica is a robust bulbous perennial growing 30–60 cm (12–24 in) tall. Each plant may bear up to 30, conical, narrow, bell-shaped flowers, up to 0.75 in (1.9 cm) long, ranging in colour from deep purple to greenish brown.

A plant commonly found in cultivation outside its range is the cultivar 'Adiyaman', which is taller and more free-flowering than populations of the species inside its native range. This cultivar has gained the Royal Horticultural Society's Award of Garden Merit.
