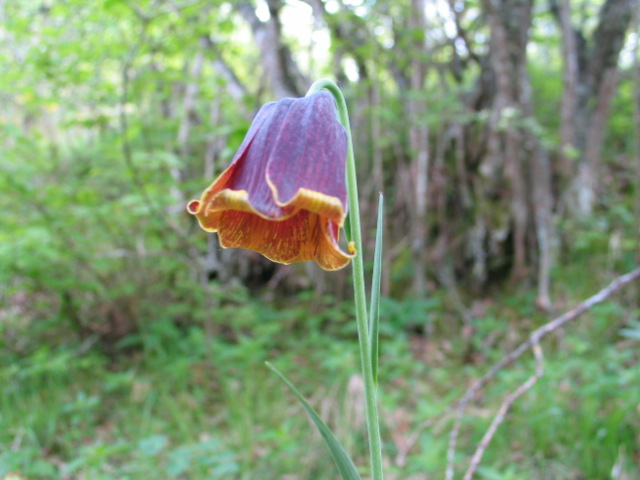

Scientific classification
- Kingdom: Plantae
- Clade: Tracheophytes
- Clade: Angiosperms
- Clade: Monocots
- Order: Liliales
- Family: Liliaceae
- Subfamily: Lilioideae
- Genus: Fritillaria
- Species: F. pyrenaica

Binomial name
- Fritillaria pyrenaica L.

Synonyms
- Fritillaria aquitanica Mill.; Fritillaria linophylla Doumenjou ex Nyman; Fritillaria lurida Salisb.; Fritillaria nervosa Willd.; Fritillaria nigra Mill.; Fritillaria pyrenaea Gren.; Fritillaria pyrenaica var. lutescens Lindl. ex Baker; Fritillaria tardiflora Lehm. ex Schult. & Schult.f.; Fritillaria umbellata Mill.

= Fritillaria pyrenaica =

Pyrenean fritillary

Species of flowering plant

Fritillaria pyrenaica is a species of flowering plant in the lily family Liliaceae, native to the Pyrenees in Spain and France. Common names include Pyrenean fritillary and Pyrenean snake's-head. It is a bulbous perennial growing to 45 cm (18 in). The pendent, bell-shaped flowers are borne in spring. They have recurved tepals which are purple tinged with brown and yellow. Like other species in this genus, notably F. meleagris, they are strongly chequered.

== Subspecies ==
Two subspecies are currently recognized:

Fritillaria pyrenaica subsp. boissieri (Costa) Vigo & Valdés

Fritillaria pyrenaica subsp. pyrenaica

== Cultivation ==
In cultivation in the UK Fritillaria pyrenaica has gained the Royal Horticultural Society's Award of Garden Merit. It grows in any open place, such as a flower border or meadow, in full sun. Like all the Liliaceae, it is subject to predation by the scarlet lily beetle and its larvae.

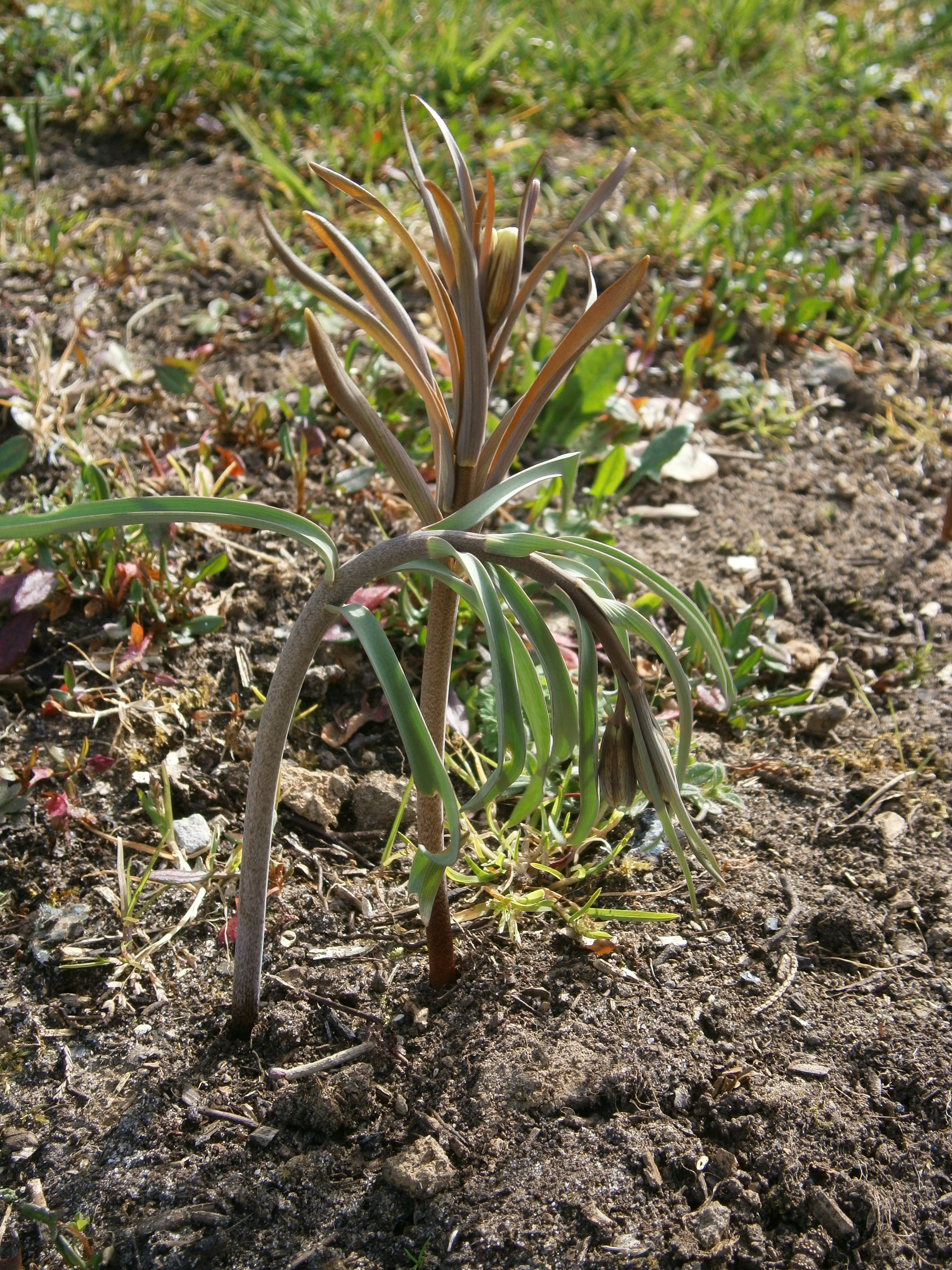
Arising

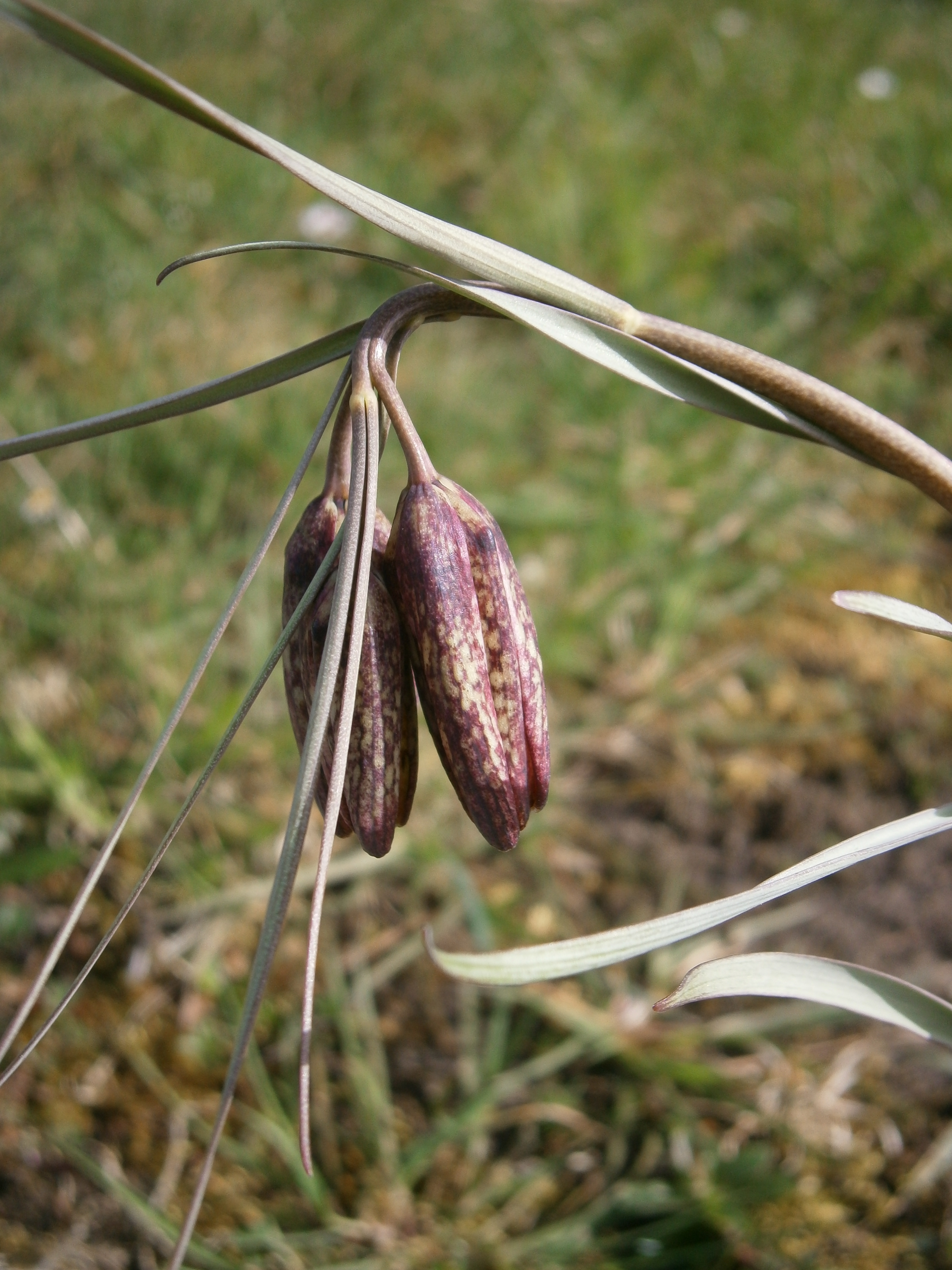
Flower buds

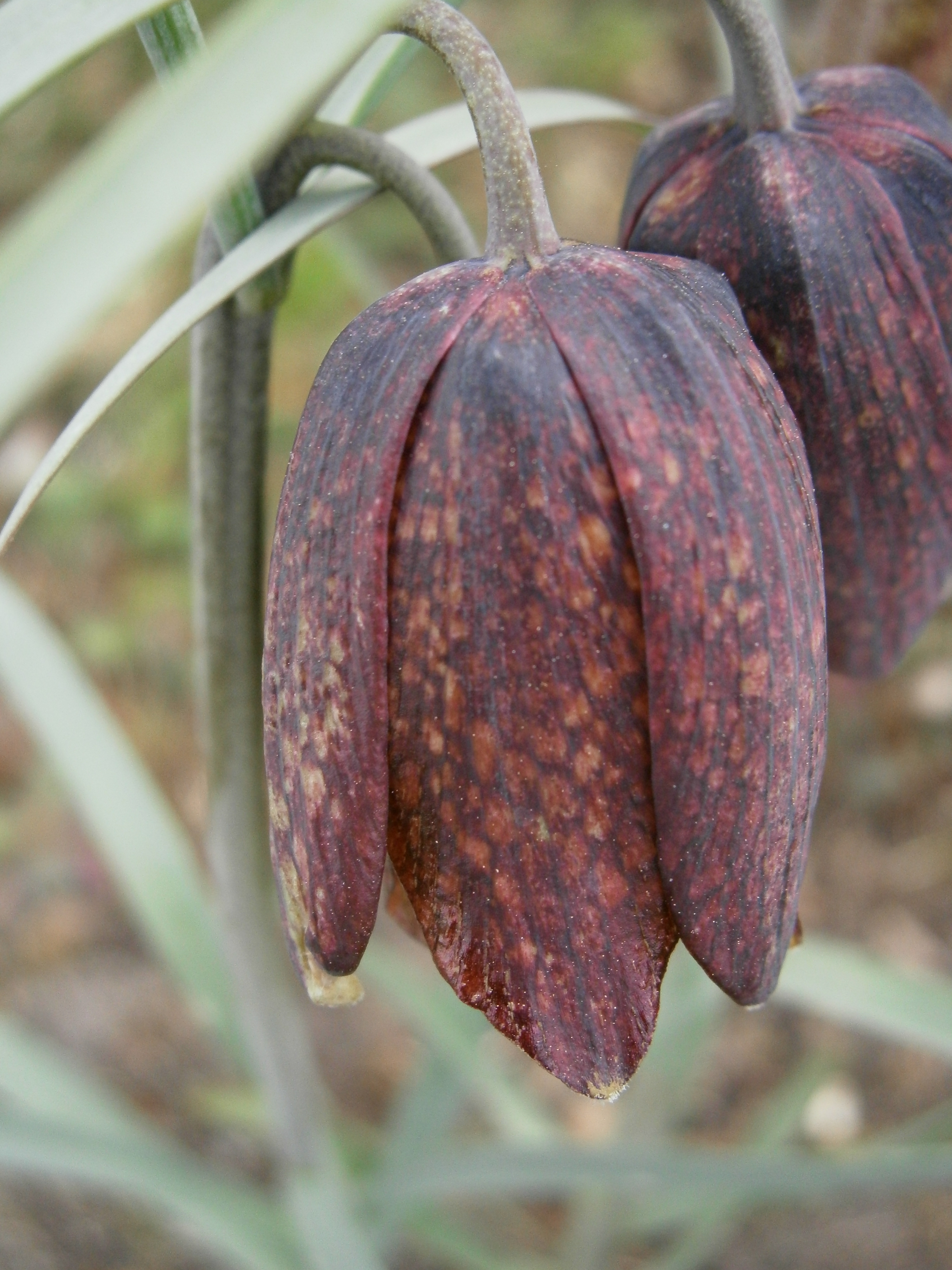
Flower (outer side)

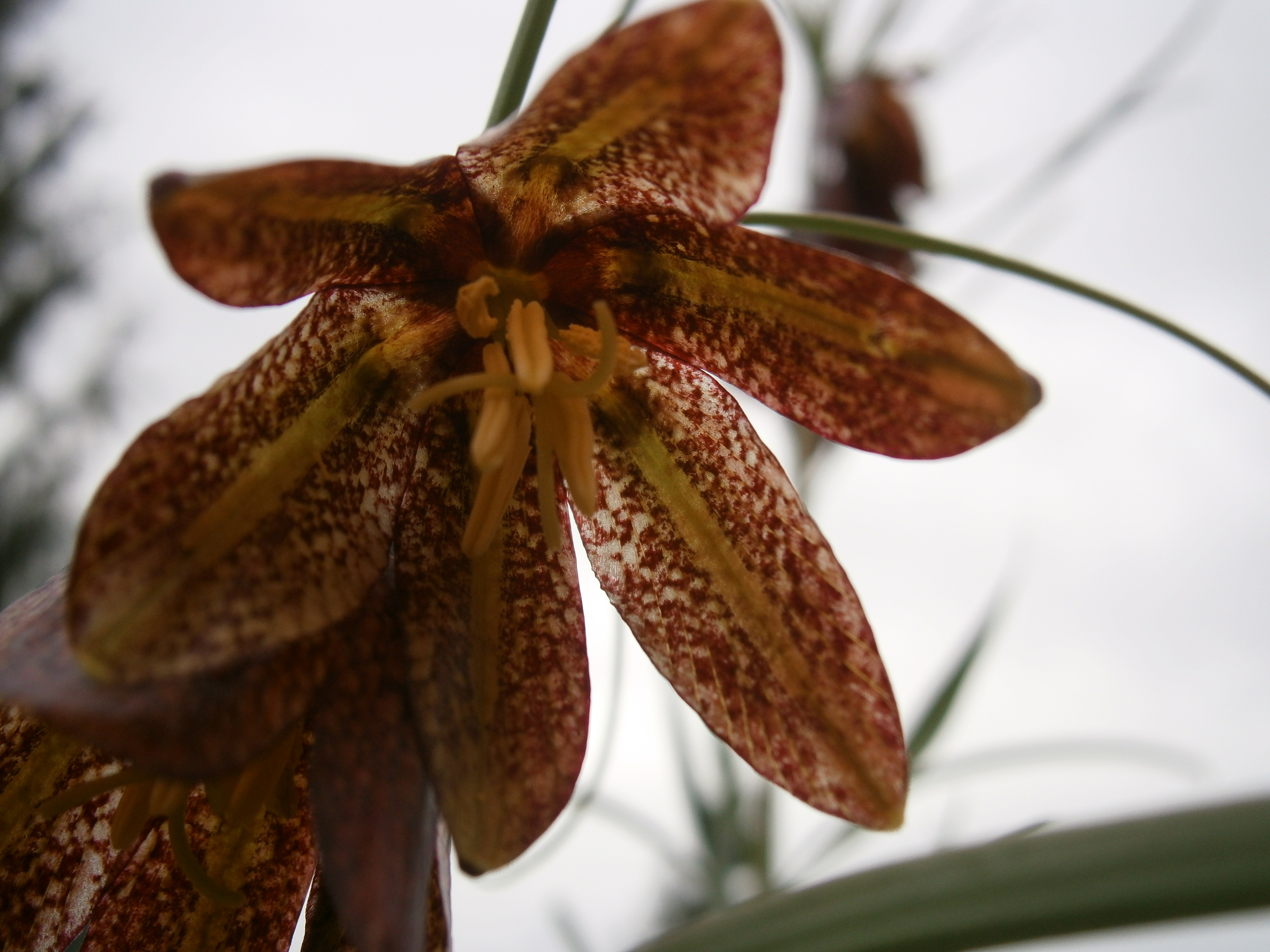
Flower (inner side)

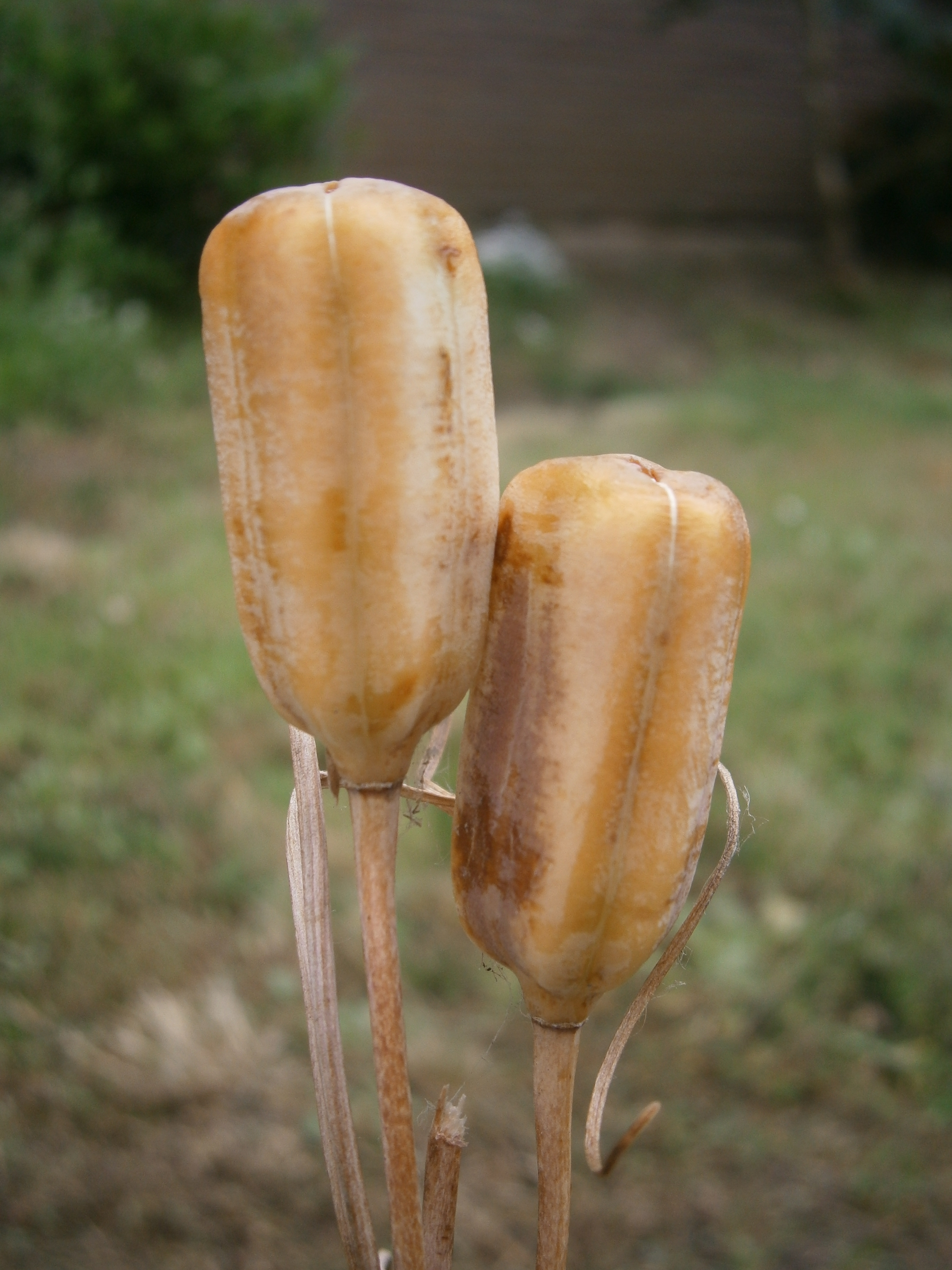
Mature seed capsules
