= Fritillaria walujewii =

Scientific classification
- Kingdom: Plantae
- Clade: Tracheophytes
- Clade: Angiosperms
- Clade: Monocots
- Order: Liliales
- Family: Liliaceae
- Subfamily: Lilioideae
- Tribe: Lilieae
- Genus: Fritillaria
- Species: F. walujewii

Binomial name
- Fritillaria walujewii Regel

Synonyms
- Synonymy: Fritillaria xinyuanensis Y.K.Yang & J.K.Wu; Fritillaria tianshanica Y.K.Yang & L.R.Hsu; Fritillaria walujewii var. plena X.Z.Duan & X.J.Zheng; Fritillaria walujewii var. shawanensis X.Z.Duan & X.J.Zheng

Species of flowering plant

Fritillaria walujewii is a species of flowering plant in the lily family Liliaceae, native to Kazakhstan, Kyrgyzstan, and Xinjiang Province in western China.

It is a bulb-forming herbaceous perennial up to 50 cm tall. The flowers are hanging, bell-shaped, usually dark purple with white or darker purple markings but sometimes pale green.

The species is named in honor of P.A. von Walujew, one-time Russian Imperial Minister of the Interior.
