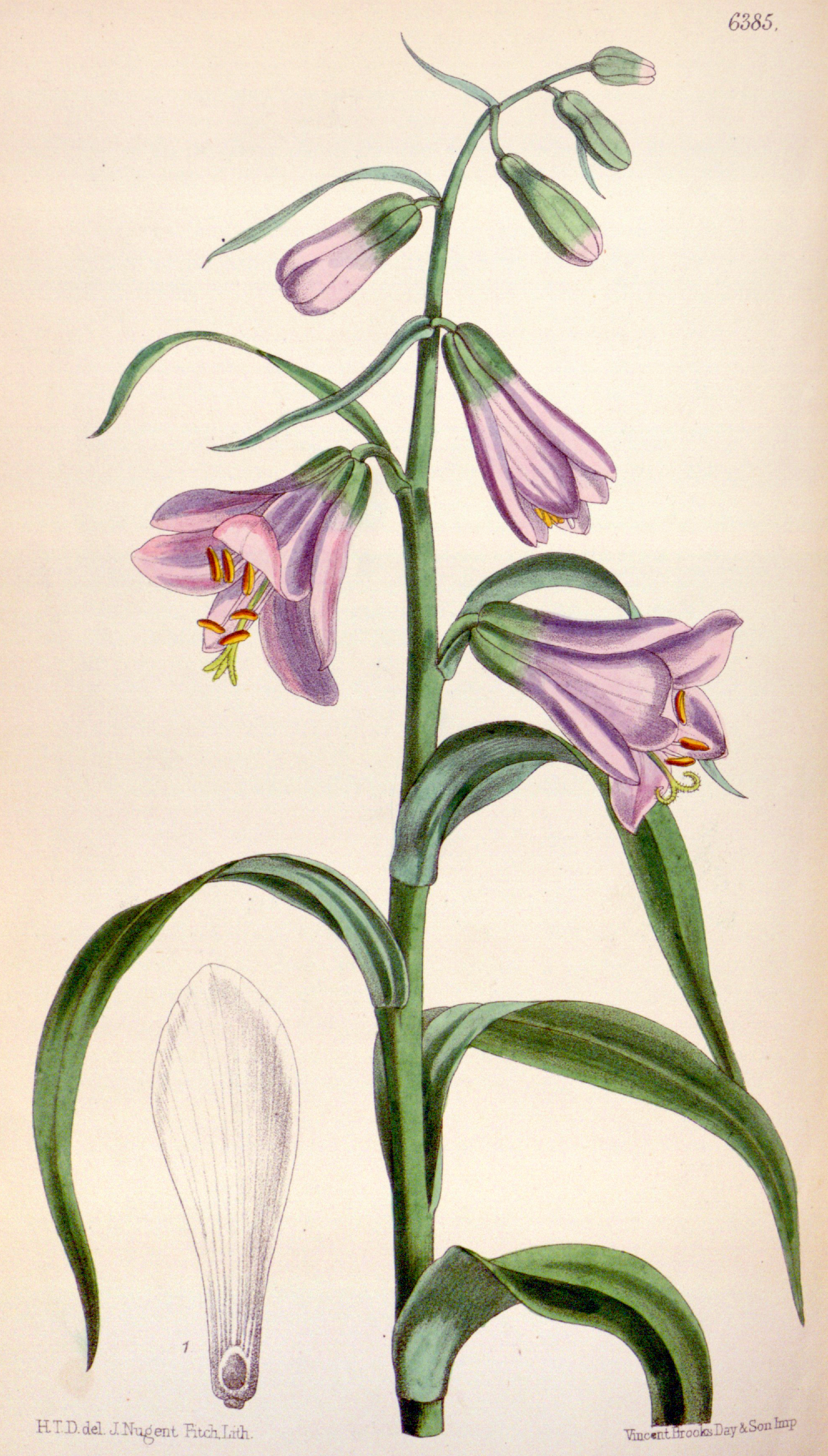
- Notholirion macrophyllum

Scientific classification
- Kingdom: Plantae
- Clade: Tracheophytes
- Clade: Angiosperms
- Clade: Monocots
- Order: Liliales
- Family: Liliaceae
- Subfamily: Lilioideae
- Tribe: Lilieae
- Genus: Notholirion
- Species: N. macrophyllum

Binomial name
- Notholirion macrophyllum (D.Don) Boiss.

Synonyms
- Fritillaria hookeri (Baker) Baker; Fritillaria macrophylla D.Don; Lilium hookeri Baker; Lilium macrophyllum (D.Don) Voss

= Notholirion macrophyllum =

Species of plant in the family Liliaceae

Notholirion macrophyllum is a species of flowering plant in the lily family, Liliaceae. They are bulbous flowering plants originating in Asia. N. macrophyllum is the smallest species in the family, with a height of 20–25 cm. The leaves are basal, 30–40 cm long and about 2 cm wide. from June to August N. macrophyllum produces a racemose inflorescence bearing 2–4 (occasionally 6) pale violet to purple or red, bell-shaped, hermaphrodite, flowers with dark purple flecks in the throat, about 5 cm in length. After flowering the plant produces a capsular fruit.

== Distribution ==
The area of distribution includes Tibet, Nepal, Sichuan, Yunnan, Bhutan, and Sikkim, where it is found in oak forests, and on grassy slopes and meadows at altitudes from 2800 to 3400 m.

== Bibliography ==
- Stephen Haws: The Lilies of China, 1986, pp. 153–154, ISBN 0881920347
