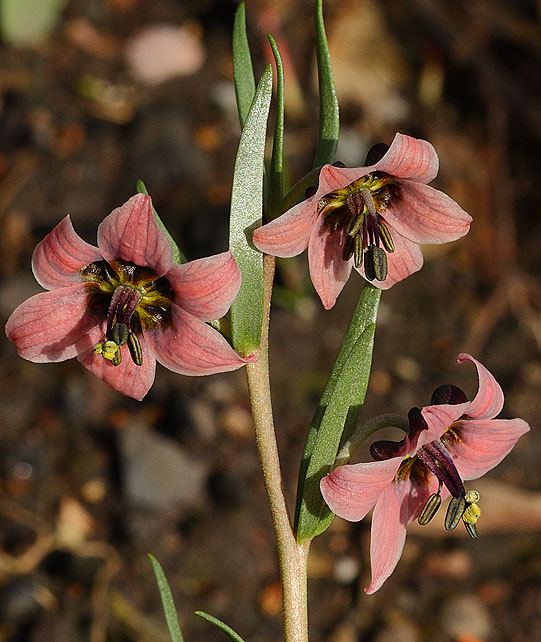

Scientific classification
- Kingdom: Plantae
- Clade: Tracheophytes
- Clade: Angiosperms
- Clade: Monocots
- Order: Liliales
- Family: Liliaceae
- Subfamily: Lilioideae
- Tribe: Lilieae
- Genus: Fritillaria
- Species: F. karelinii

Binomial name
- Fritillaria karelinii (Fisch. ex D.Don) Baker

Synonyms
- Rhinopetalum karelinii Fisch. ex D.Don; Fritillaria karelinii var. albiflora X.Z.Duan & X.J.Zheng

= Fritillaria karelinii =

Species of plant

Fritillaria karelinii is an Asian species of herbaceous perennial plant in the lily family Liliaceae, native to Kazakhstan, Kyrgyzstan, Tajikistan, Uzbekistan, Turkmenistan, Iran, Pakistan, and Xinjiang.

Fritillaria karelinii grows up to 35 cm (14 in) tall. Flowers of the wild populations are rose-violet with darker markings; flowers of cultivars may be different.

formerly included

- Fritillaria karelinii f. gibbosa (Boiss.) Bornm., now called Fritillaria gibbosa Boiss.
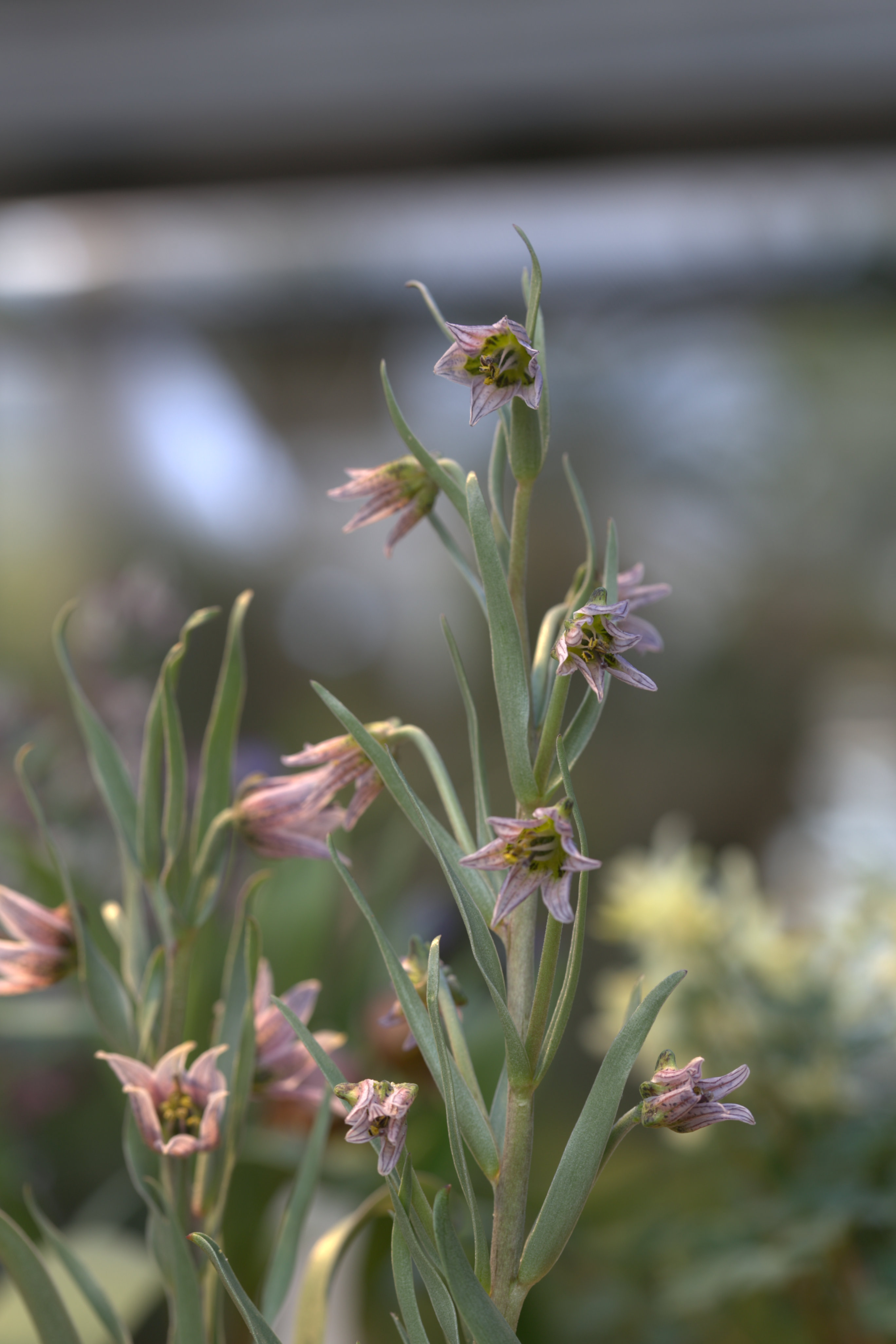

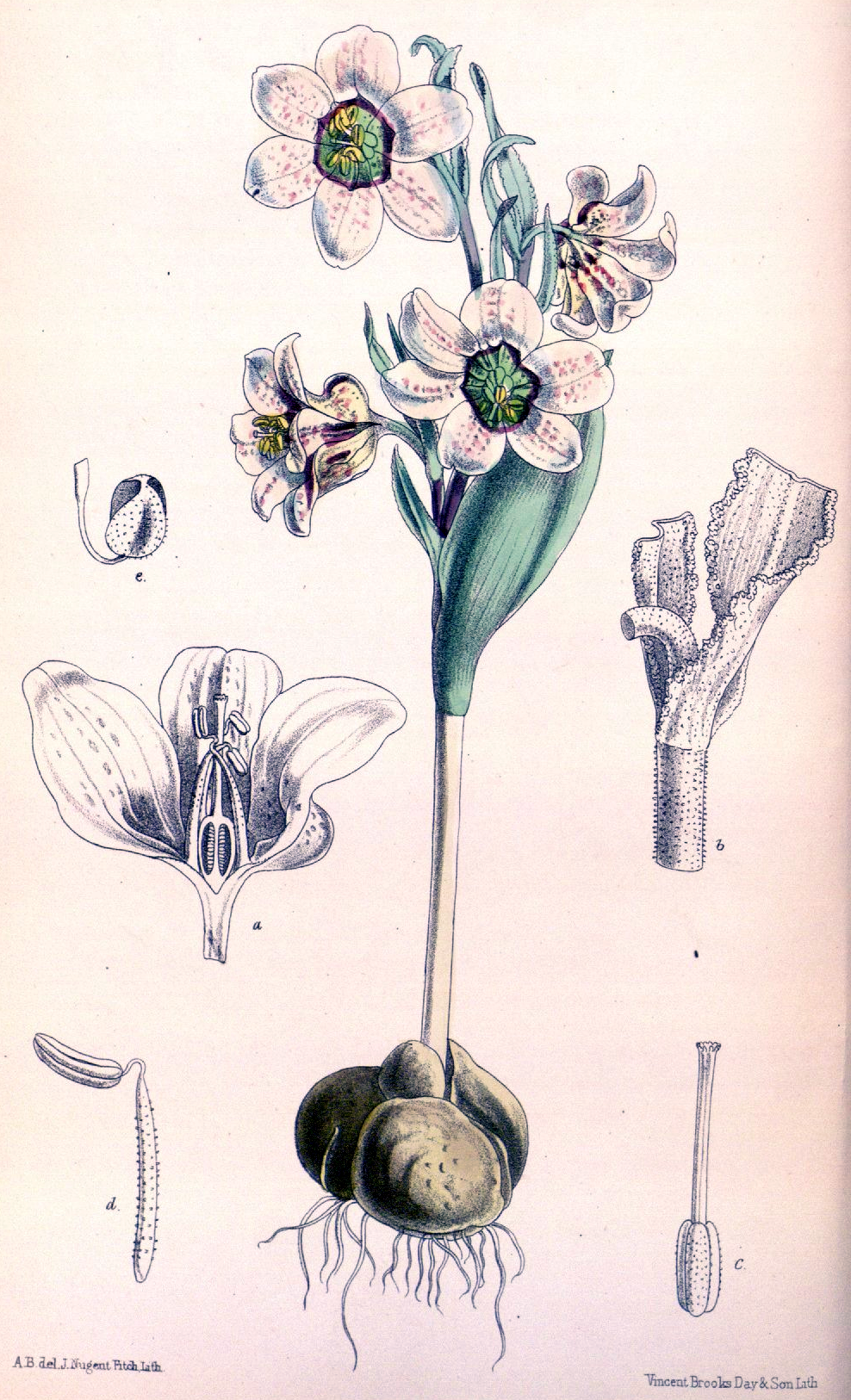
