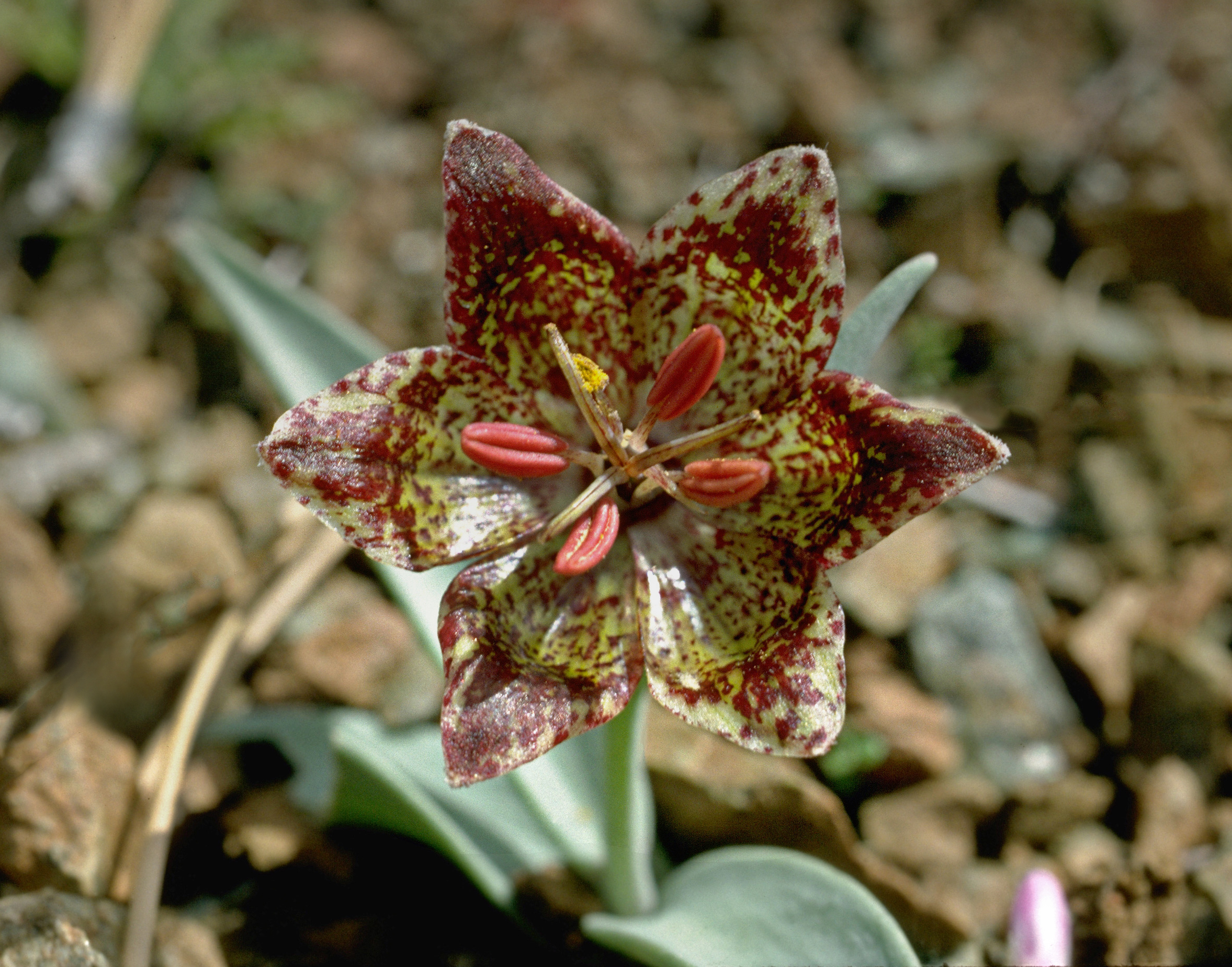

Conservation status
- Imperiled (NatureServe)

Scientific classification
- Kingdom: Plantae
- Clade: Tracheophytes
- Clade: Angiosperms
- Clade: Monocots
- Order: Liliales
- Family: Liliaceae
- Subfamily: Lilioideae
- Tribe: Lilieae
- Genus: Fritillaria
- Species: F. falcata

Binomial name
- Fritillaria falcata (Jeps.) D.E.Beetle

Synonyms
- Fritillaria atropurpurea var. falcata Jeps.

= Fritillaria falcata =

Talus fritillary

Species of flowering plant

Fritillaria falcata is a species of fritillary known by the common name talus fritillary. It is endemic to California, USA, known only from 5 counties south and east of San Francisco Bay (Monterey, San Benito, Stanislaus, Alameda and Santa Clara). It grows in the Coast Ranges at elevations of 300–1200 m, mostly on serpentine talus. It is sometimes considered a subspecies of Fritillaria atropurpurea.

== Description ==
Fritillaria falcata grows a short stem about 10 to 20 centimeters tall surrounded by two to six flat, sickle-shaped leaves up to about 8 centimeters in length. The erect, star-shaped flower has six tepals one to two centimeters long which are greenish outside and yellow mottled with purple-brown inside.
