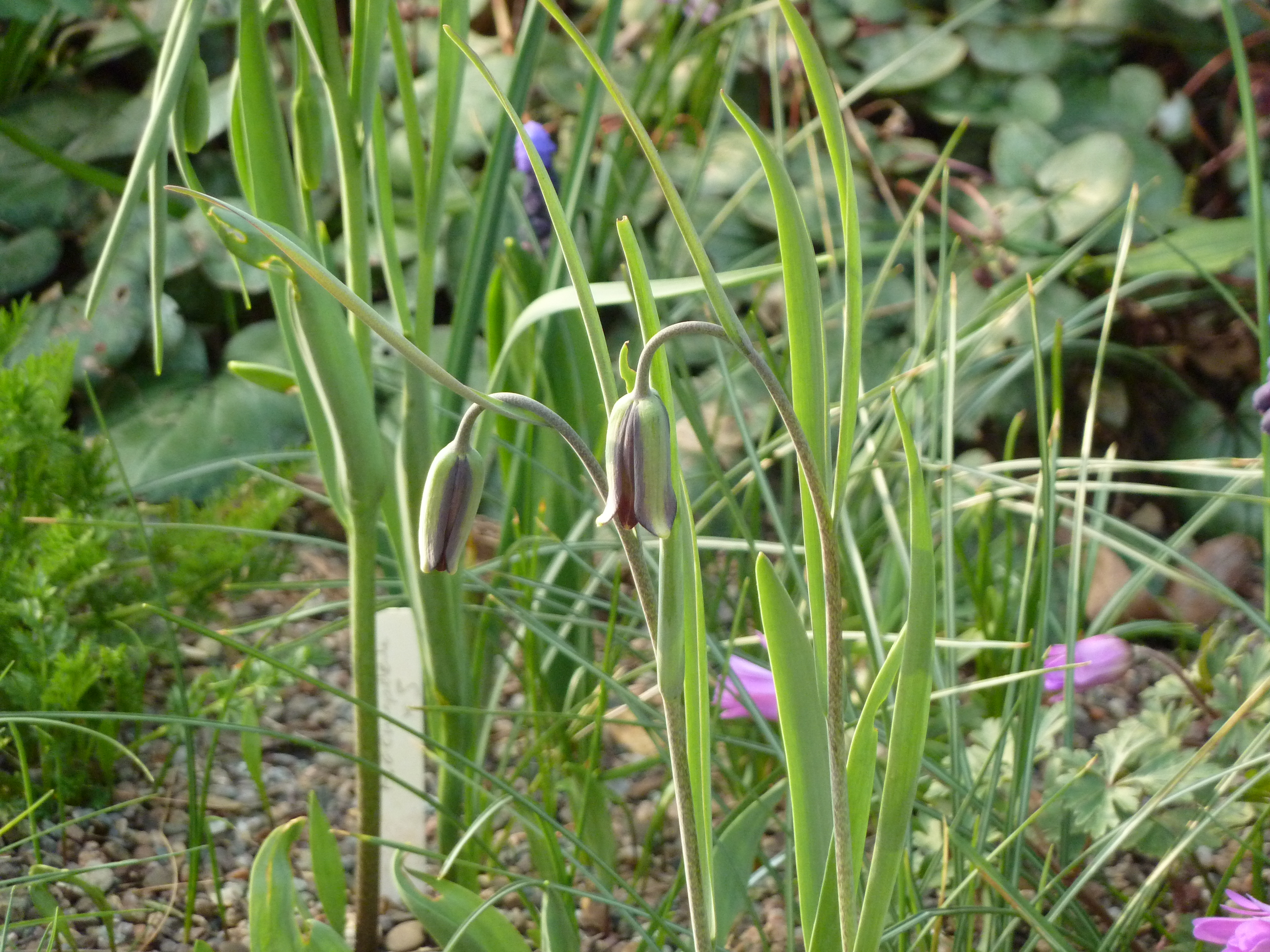

Scientific classification
- Kingdom: Plantae
- Clade: Tracheophytes
- Clade: Angiosperms
- Clade: Monocots
- Order: Liliales
- Family: Liliaceae
- Subfamily: Lilioideae
- Tribe: Lilieae
- Genus: Fritillaria
- Species: F. sinica

Binomial name
- Fritillaria sinica S.C. Chen

= Fritillaria sinica =

Species of flowering plant

Fritillaria sinica is a Chinese flowering plant species in the lily family Liliaceae. It is found in the wild only in the Province of Sichuan in southwestern China, although it is sometimes cultivated as an ornamental in other regions.

Fritillaria sinica produces bulbs up to 15 mm in diameter. The stem is up to 30 cm tall. The flowers are olive-green with deep purple markings.
