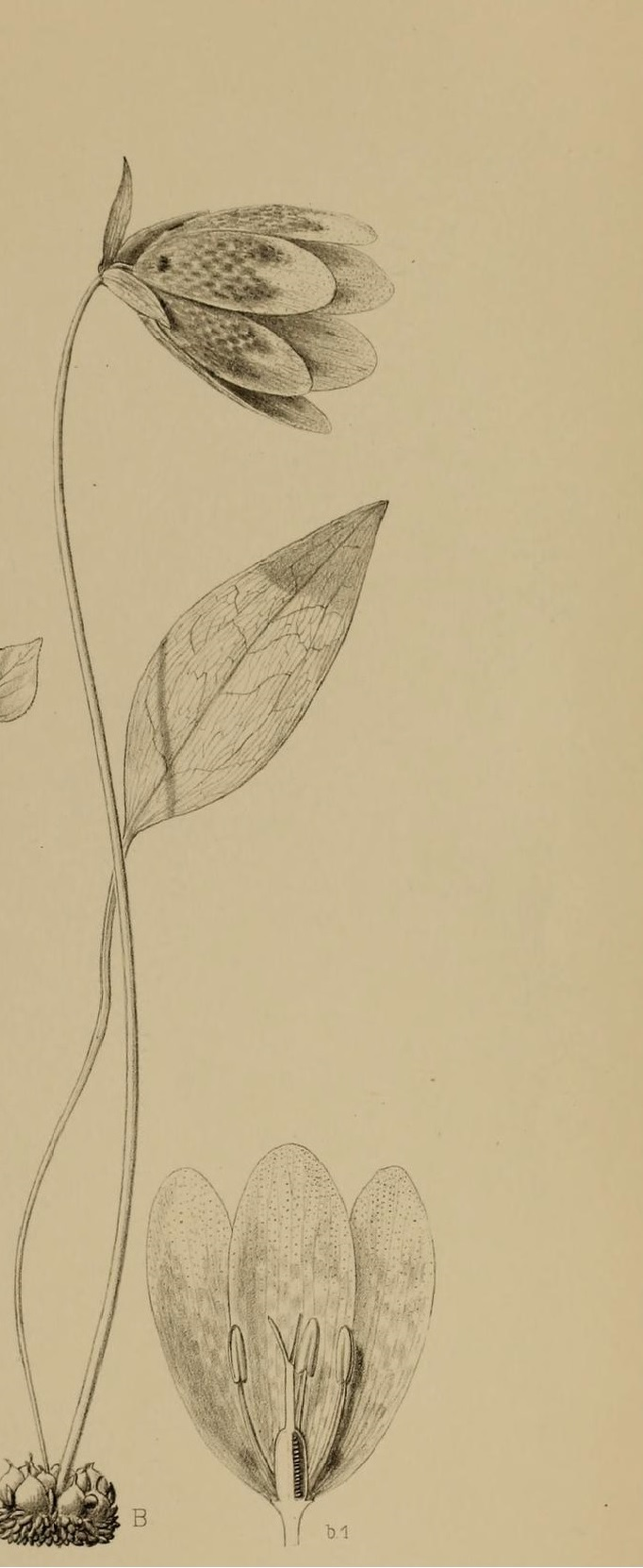
- Franchet Fdavidi

Scientific classification
- Kingdom: Plantae
- Clade: Tracheophytes
- Clade: Angiosperms
- Clade: Monocots
- Order: Liliales
- Family: Liliaceae
- Subfamily: Lilioideae
- Tribe: Lilieae
- Genus: Fritillaria
- Species: F. davidii

Binomial name
- Fritillaria davidii Franch.

= Fritillaria davidii =

Species of flowering plant

Fritillaria davidii is an Asian species of herbaceous plant in the lily family, native to Sichuan Province in China.

Fritillaria davidii is a bulb-forming perennial up to 30 cm tall. Flowers are nodding (hanging downward), bell-shaped, yellow with purple parkings.

The species is named for Père David (1826–1900), French missionary and amateur naturalist.
