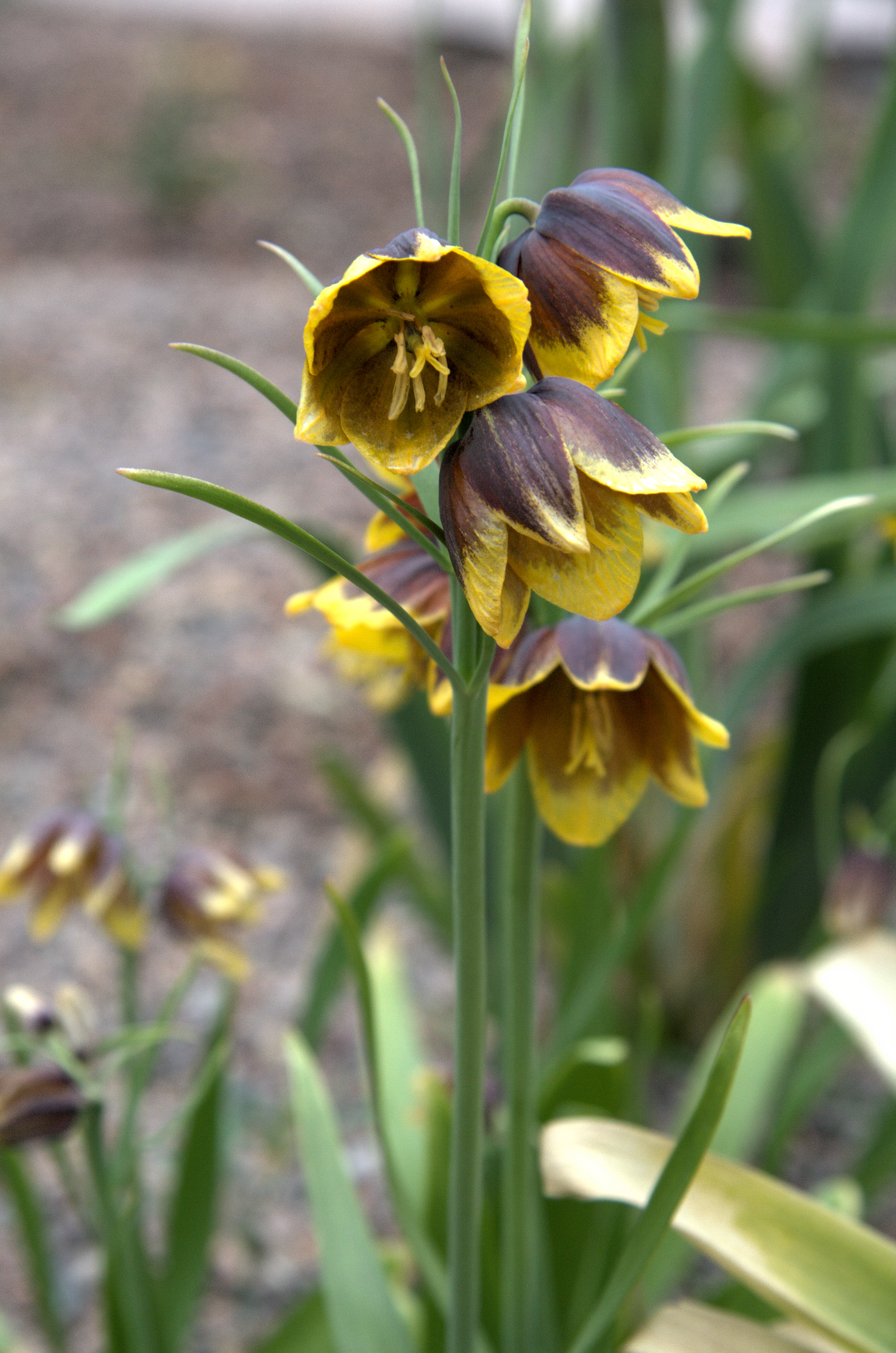

Scientific classification
- Kingdom: Plantae
- Clade: Embryophytes
- Clade: Tracheophytes
- Clade: Angiosperms
- Clade: Monocots
- Order: Liliales
- Family: Liliaceae
- Subfamily: Lilioideae
- Genus: Fritillaria
- Species: F. reuteri

Binomial name
- Fritillaria reuteri Boiss.

= Fritillaria reuteri =

Species of flowering plant

Fritillaria reuteri is a perennial herbaceous bulbous plant, distributed in Turkey and Iran. It is a species in the genus Fritillaria, in the family Liliaceae. It is placed in the subgenus Fritillaria.

== Description ==
Fritillaria reuteri is characterised by purplish-brown flowers, tall stems, and narrow leaves. Each pedicel bears two bracts at the base. It flowers from May to June.

== Taxonomy ==
It was described by Boissier in 1844, Baker (1874), who divided Fritillaria into subgenera, placed F. reuteri in subgenus Monocodon, a subgenus later subsumed into Fritillaria. Modern classifications, based on molecular phylogenetics, confirm this placement.

== Distribution and habitat ==
This plant inhabits high mountainous areas west of Esfahan, Iran, in wet soil or running water.

== Bibliography ==
- Baker, J. G. (1874). "Revision of the Genera and Species of Tulipeae". Botanical Journal of the Linnean Society. XIV (76). F. reuteri p. 256. doi:10.1111/j.1095-8339.1874.tb00314.x.
- Boissier, E (1844). "Liliaceae: Fritillaria reuteri". Diagnoses Plantarum Orientalium Novarum. 5: 57–58.
- Day, Peter D.; Berger, Madeleine; Hill, Laurence; Fay, Michael F.; Leitch, Andrew R.; Leitch, Ilia J.; Kelly, Laura J. (November 2014). "Evolutionary relationships in the medicinally important genus Fritillaria L. (Liliaceae)". Molecular Phylogenetics and Evolution. 80: 11–19. doi:10.1016/j.ympev.2014.07.024. PMID 25124097.
- Kiani, Mahmoud; Mohammadi, Shirin; Babaei, Alireza; Sefidkon, Fatemeh; Naghavi, Mohamad Reza; Ranjbar, Mojtaba; Razavi, Seyed Ali; Saeidi, Keramatollah; Jafari, Hadi; Asgari, Davoud; Potter, Daniel (September 2017). "Iran supports a great share of biodiversity and floristic endemism for Fritillaria spp. (Liliaceae): A Review". Plant Diversity. 39 (5): 245–262. doi:10.1016/j.pld.2017.09.002. PMC 6112302. PMID 30159518.

=== Databases ===
- TPL (2013). "The Plant List 1.1: Fritillaria reuteri Boiss". Royal Botanic Gardens, Kew and Missouri Botanical Garden.
- WCSP. "Fritillaria reuteri Boiss.". World Checklist of Selected Plant Families (WCSP). Royal Botanic Gardens, Kew.
- IPNI (2005). "Fritillaria reuteri Boiss.". International Plant Names Index.
- "Fritillaria reuteri". Fritillaria species: R-S. Fritillaria Group, Alpine Garden Society.
- Roskov Y.; Kunze T.; Orrell T.; Abucay L.; Paglinawan L.; Culham A.; Bailly N.; Kirk P.; Bourgoin T.; Baillargeon G.; Decock W.; De Wever A.; Didžiulis V., eds. (2014). "Fritillaria reuteri Boiss". Species 2000 & ITIS Catalogue of Life: 2014 Annual Checklist. Naturalis, Leiden, the Netherlands: ITIS, Royal Botanic Gardens, Kew.
- "Fritillaria reuteri Boiss". eMonocot. Royal Botanic Gardens, Kew.
