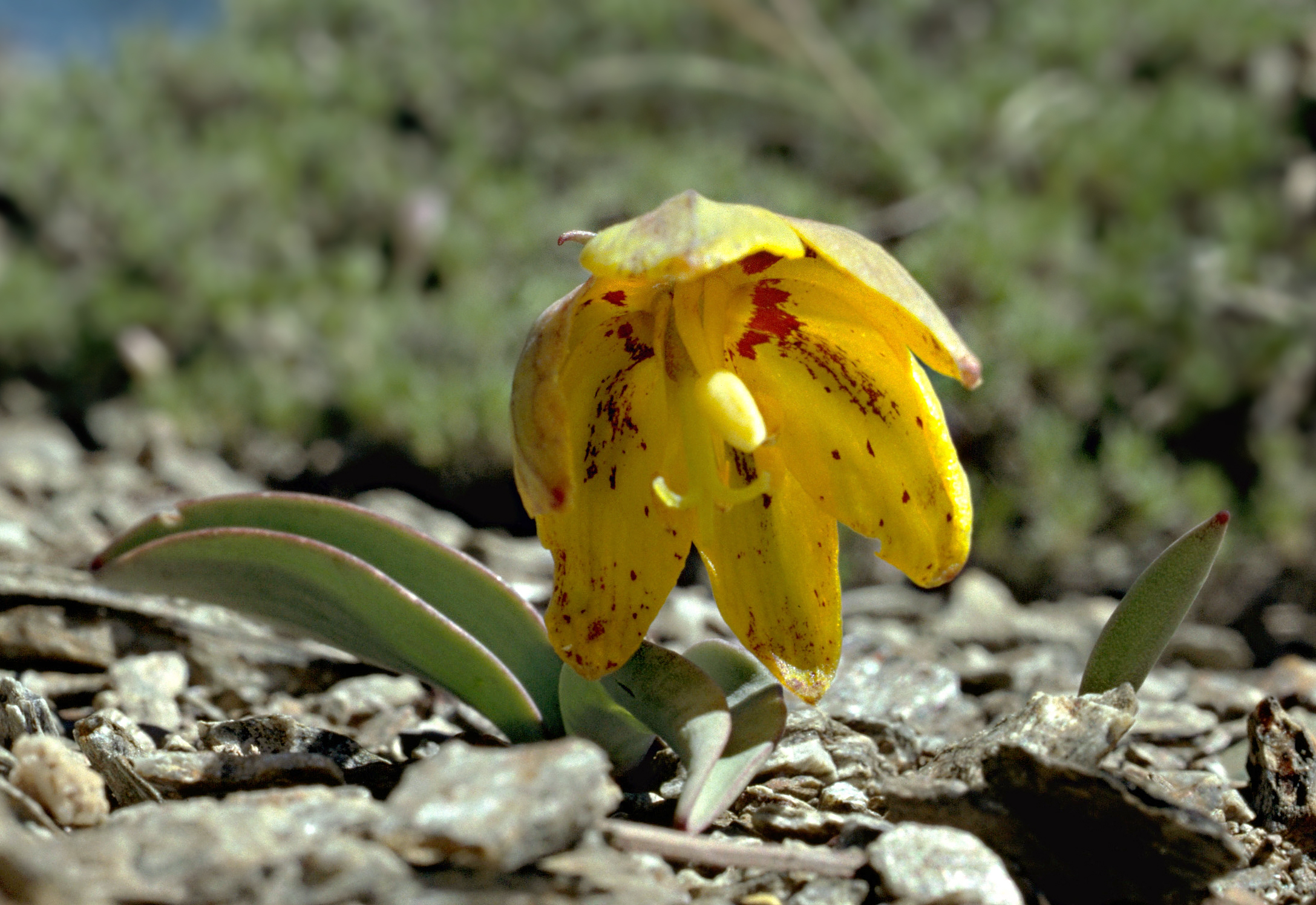

Scientific classification
- Kingdom: Plantae
- Clade: Tracheophytes
- Clade: Angiosperms
- Clade: Monocots
- Order: Liliales
- Family: Liliaceae
- Subfamily: Lilioideae
- Tribe: Lilieae
- Genus: Fritillaria
- Species: F. glauca

Binomial name
- Fritillaria glauca Greene

= Fritillaria glauca =

Species of plant

Fritillaria glauca is a species of fritillary known by the common names Siskiyou fritillary and Siskiyou missionbells.

It is native to northern California, USA (as far south as Lake County) and southern Oregon (as far north as Lane County), where it is found in the serpentine talus on the slopes of the local mountains.

== Description ==
This uncommon wildflower has a short stem reaching 5–20 cm (2.0–7.9 in) tall and is surrounded by two to four thick, sickle-shaped leaves. It is sometimes stunted-looking with a curled or warped stem; it often grows in exposed mountainous areas. The flower is nodding and has six thick tepals 1–2 cm long. They are yellow to purple and densely mottled. The fruits are winged.
