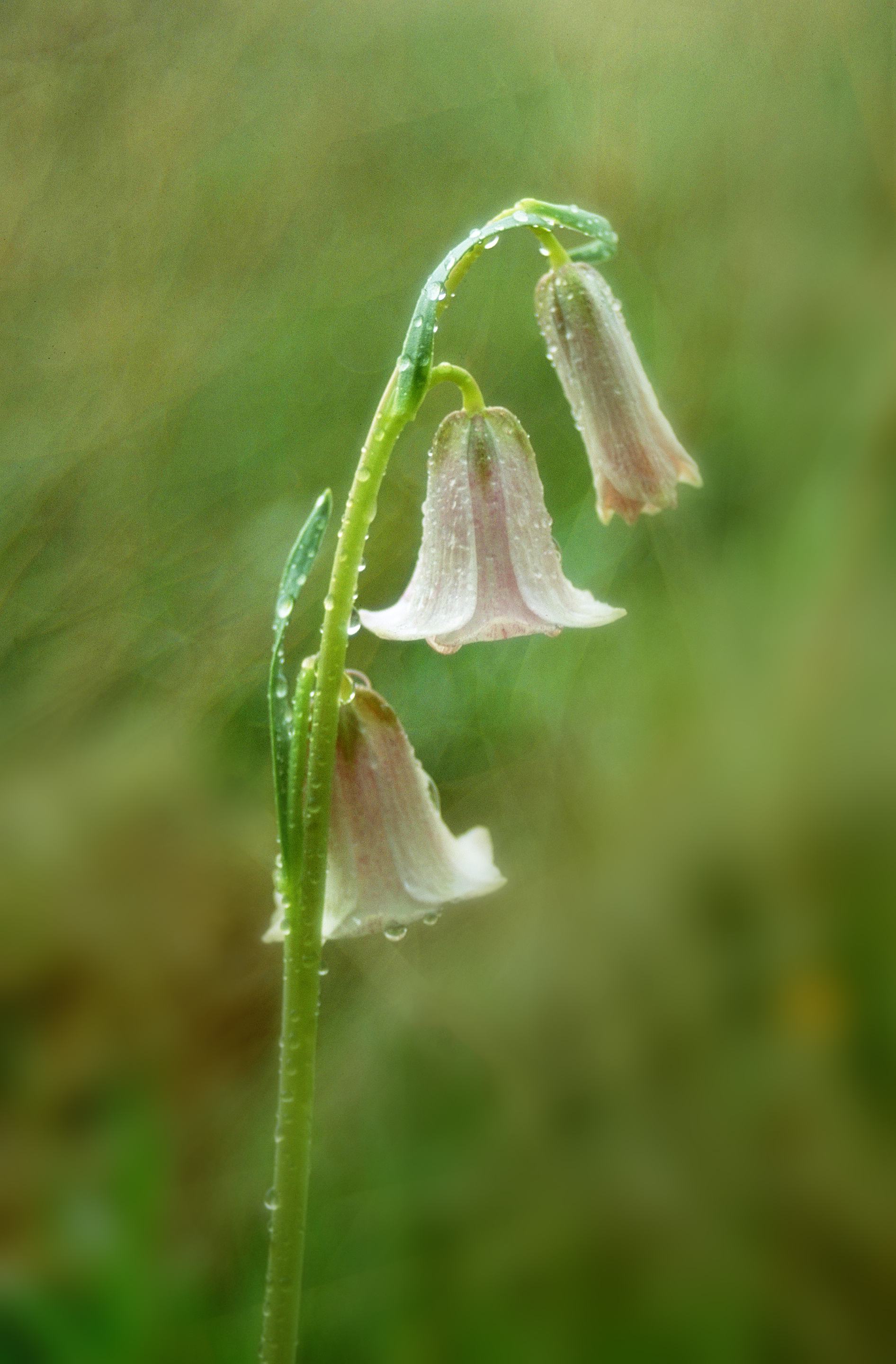

Conservation status
- Critically Imperiled (NatureServe)

Scientific classification
- Kingdom: Plantae
- Clade: Tracheophytes
- Clade: Angiosperms
- Clade: Monocots
- Order: Liliales
- Family: Liliaceae
- Subfamily: Lilioideae
- Tribe: Lilieae
- Genus: Fritillaria
- Species: F. striata

Binomial name
- Fritillaria striata Eastw.

= Fritillaria striata =

Species of flowering plant

Fritillaria striata, the striped adobe lily, is an uncommon species of fritillary.

== Distribution ==
The plant is endemic to California, USA, where it is known only from the southern Sierra Nevada foothills in Kern County and Tulare County, and east of the Tejon Hills in the Tehachapi Mountains foothills, on the Tejon Ranch in Kern County. It grows in adobe clay soils.

== Description ==
Fritillaria striata produces an erect stem 25 to 40 centimeters tall, bearing pairs of long oval-shaped leaves 6 to 7 centimeters long.

The nodding flower is a bell-shaped, fragrant bloom with six light pink tepals each striped with darker pink. The tips roll back. In the darker center of the flower is a greenish-yellow nectary surrounded by yellow anthers.

== Conservation ==
The main threat to the plant is cattle grazing, wild pigs, and invasive species of grasses. Fritillaria striata is listed by the State of California as a threatened species, and is on the California Native Plant Society Inventory of Rare and Endangered Plants of California, listed as seriously endangered in California.
