= Fritillaria tortifolia =

Scientific classification
- Kingdom: Plantae
- Clade: Tracheophytes
- Clade: Angiosperms
- Clade: Monocots
- Order: Liliales
- Family: Liliaceae
- Subfamily: Lilioideae
- Tribe: Lilieae
- Genus: Fritillaria
- Species: F. tortifolia

Binomial name
- Fritillaria tortifolia X.Z.Duan & X.J.Zheng

Synonyms
- Synonymy: Fritillaria tortifolia var. barlikensis X.Z.Duan & X.J.Zheng; Fritillaria tortifolia var. plena X.Z.Duan & X.J.Zheng; Fritillaria tortifolia var. wusunica X.Z.Duan & X.J.Zheng

Species of flowering plant

Fritillaria tortifolia is a flowering plant species in the lily family Liliaceae. It is found only in the northwestern part of Xinjiang Province, the extreme northwestern corner of China.

Fritillaria tortifolia produces bulbs up to 30 mm in diameter. The stem is up to 100 cm tall. The flowers are pendent, nodding, bell-shaped, whitish or very pale yellow with purple or brown markings.

formerly included

In 1989, Duan & Zheng recognized several taxa at the varietal level, none of which is accepted in more recent sources. Some are now regarded as synonymous with Fritillaria tortifolia (see synonym list at right). Three others are now considered synonyms of Fritillaria verticillata:

- Fritillaria tortifolia var. albiflora
- Fritillaria tortifolia var. citrina
- Fritillaria tortifolia var. parviflora
