= Fritillaria viridea =

Conservation status
- Imperiled (NatureServe)

Scientific classification
- Kingdom: Plantae
- Clade: Tracheophytes
- Clade: Angiosperms
- Clade: Monocots
- Order: Liliales
- Family: Liliaceae
- Subfamily: Lilioideae
- Tribe: Lilieae
- Genus: Fritillaria
- Species: F. viridea

Binomial name
- Fritillaria viridea Kellogg

Species of flowering plant

Fritillaria viridea is a rare species of flowering plant in the lily family Liliaceae, known by the common name San Benito fritillary. It is endemic to the Central Coast Ranges of California, USA, where it belongs to the chaparral and serpentine soils flora. There are confirmed records of this species from San Benito and Monterey Counties plus unconfirmed reports from Fresno and San Luis Obispo Counties.

== Description ==
This bulbous herbaceous perennial produces an erect stem 30–65 cm (12–26 in) tall, surrounded by several lance-shaped leaves up to 10 cm (3.9 in) long. The smooth stem is topped with a raceme inflorescence of one or nodding bell-shaped flowers. Each flower has six tepals 1–2 cm (0.39–0.79 in) long, which are pale to very dark green.
