= Fritillaria grandiflora =

Scientific classification
- Kingdom: Plantae
- Clade: Tracheophytes
- Clade: Angiosperms
- Clade: Monocots
- Order: Liliales
- Family: Liliaceae
- Subfamily: Lilioideae
- Tribe: Lilieae
- Genus: Fritillaria
- Species: F. grandiflora

Binomial name
- Fritillaria grandiflora Grossh.

Synonyms
- Fritillaria kotschyana subsp. grandiflora (Grossh.) Rix

Species of flowering plant

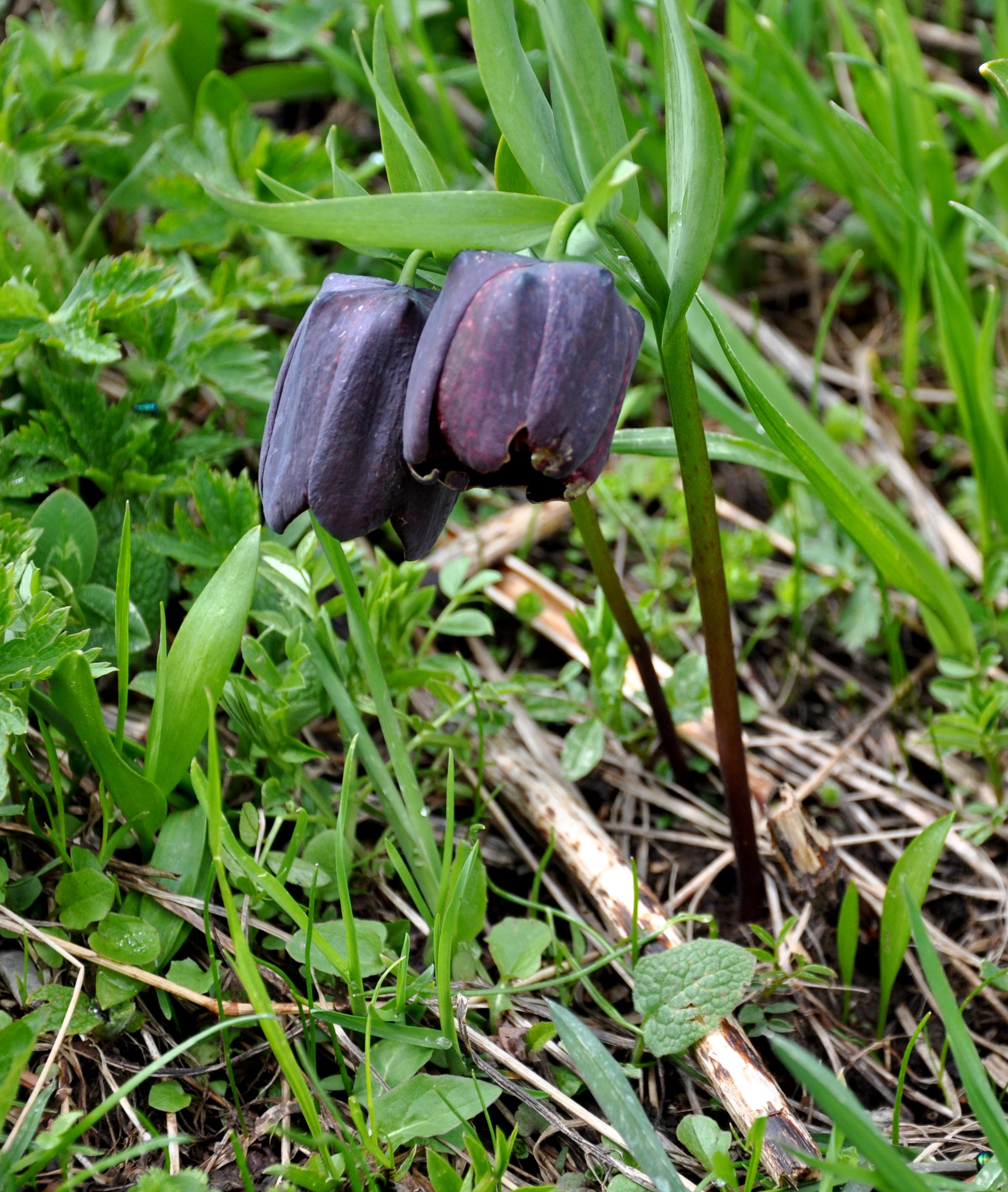
Fritillaria caucasica

Fritillaria grandiflora is a species of fritillary native to Azerbaijan and Georgia. It grows in temperate mixed forests. The species is listed in the Red Data Book of Azerbaijan, having been previously listed in the Red Data Book of the Soviet Union.
