= Fritillaria dajinensis =

Scientific classification
- Kingdom: Plantae
- Clade: Tracheophytes
- Clade: Angiosperms
- Clade: Monocots
- Order: Liliales
- Family: Liliaceae
- Subfamily: Lilioideae
- Tribe: Lilieae
- Genus: Fritillaria
- Species: F. dajinensis

Binomial name
- Fritillaria dajinensis S.C.Chen

Species of flowering plant

Fritillaria dajinensis is an Asian species of herbaceous plant in the lily family, native to Sichuan Province in China.

Fritillaria dajinensis is a bulb-forming perennial up to 50 cm tall. Flowers are nodding (hanging downward), greenish yellow, with purple spots.
