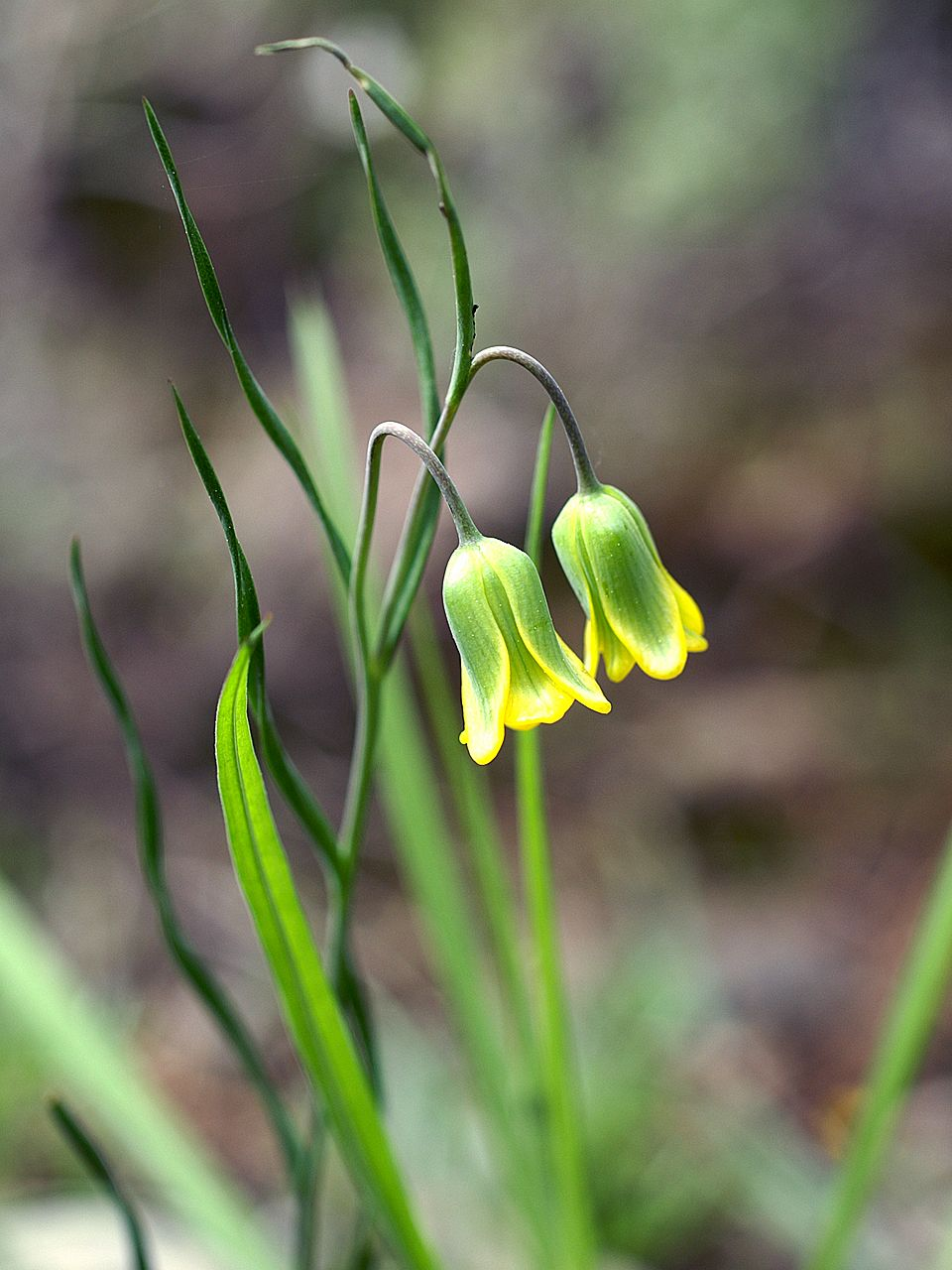

Scientific classification
- Kingdom: Plantae
- Clade: Tracheophytes
- Clade: Angiosperms
- Clade: Monocots
- Order: Liliales
- Family: Liliaceae
- Subfamily: Lilioideae
- Tribe: Lilieae
- Genus: Fritillaria
- Species: F. rhodia

Binomial name
- Fritillaria rhodia Velen.

= Fritillaria rhodia =

Rhodian fritillary

Species of flowering plant

Fritillaria rhodia, called the Rhodian fritillary, is a Greek species of plant in the lily family Liliaceae. The only known wild populations are on the Island of Rhodes in the Aegean Sea, although the species has been cultivated elsewhere.
