= Fritillaria alburyana =

Scientific classification
- Kingdom: Plantae
- Clade: Embryophytes
- Clade: Tracheophytes
- Clade: Angiosperms
- Clade: Monocots
- Order: Liliales
- Family: Liliaceae
- Subfamily: Lilioideae
- Genus: Fritillaria
- Species: F. alburyana

Binomial name
- Fritillaria alburyana Rix

Synonyms
- Fritillaria erzurumica Kasapligil; Fritillaria erzurumica var. abortivus Kasapligil

Species of flowering plant

Fritillaria alburyana is a plant native to eastern Turkey. It grows mainly in temperate climates.
