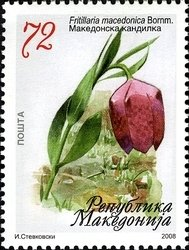

Scientific classification
- Kingdom: Plantae
- Clade: Tracheophytes
- Clade: Angiosperms
- Clade: Monocots
- Order: Liliales
- Family: Liliaceae
- Subfamily: Lilioideae
- Tribe: Lilieae
- Genus: Fritillaria
- Species: F. macedonica

Binomial name
- Fritillaria macedonica Bornm.

= Fritillaria macedonica =

Species of flowering plant

Fritillaria macedonica is a European species of flowering plant in the lily family Liliaceae, native to Albania, North Macedonia, Greece and Serbia.
