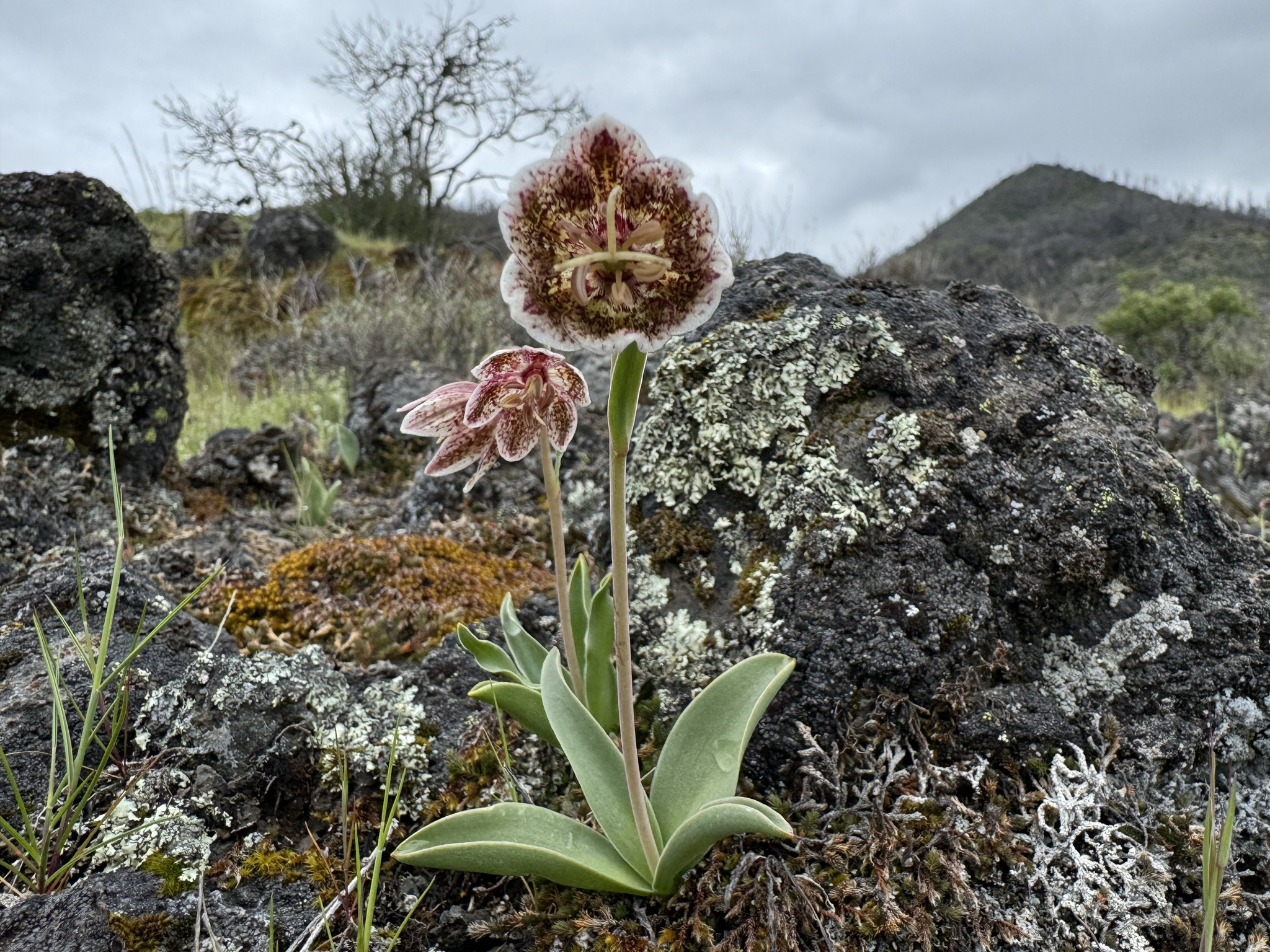

Scientific classification
- Kingdom: Plantae
- Clade: Tracheophytes
- Clade: Angiosperms
- Clade: Monocots
- Order: Liliales
- Family: Liliaceae
- Subfamily: Lilioideae
- Tribe: Lilieae
- Genus: Fritillaria
- Species: F. purdyi

Binomial name
- Fritillaria purdyi Eastw.

= Fritillaria purdyi =

Species of flowering plant

Fritillaria purdyi, the Purdy's fritillary, is a rare species of flowering plant in the lily family Liliaceae.

It is endemic to northwestern California, USA, from San Francisco Bay north, where it grows in the serpentine soils of the coastal and inland California Coast Ranges.

== Description ==
Fritillaria purdyi is a bulb-forming herbaceous perennial with an erect stem 10 to 40 centimeters tall. The leaves are ovate, up to 10 centimeters long.

The smooth stem is topped with a raceme inflorescence of one or more cup- or bell-shaped flowers. Each flower has 6 white tepals heavily shaded with brownish-purple streaks or marks and pink tinting.
