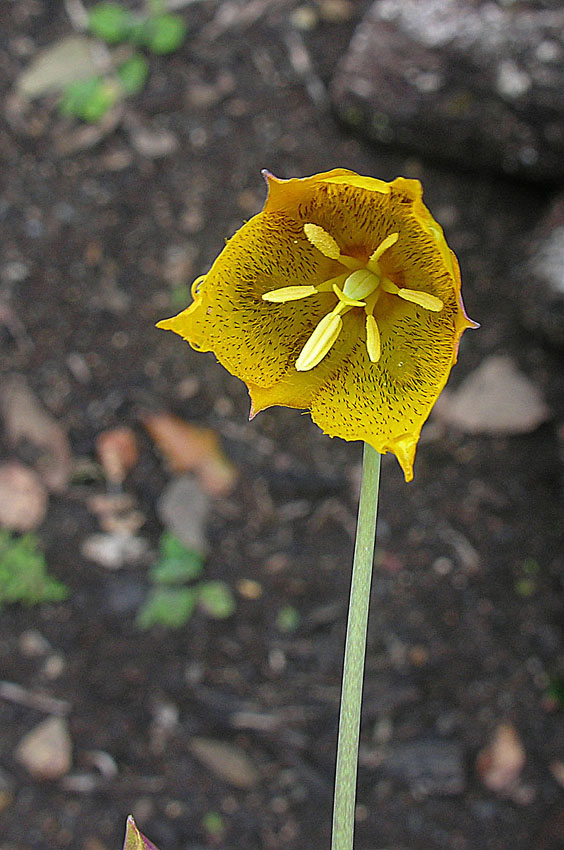
- Photo taken in Oaxaca

Scientific classification
- Kingdom: Plantae
- Clade: Tracheophytes
- Clade: Angiosperms
- Clade: Monocots
- Order: Liliales
- Family: Liliaceae
- Genus: Calochortus
- Species: C. barbatus

Binomial name
- Calochortus barbatus (Kunth) Painter

Synonyms
- Synonymy: Fritillaria barbata Kunth; Cyclobothra barbata (Kunth) D.Don; Calochortus flavus Schult.f.; Calochortus pallidus Schult.f.; Cyclobothra flava (Schult.f.) Lindl.; Cyclobothra pallida (Schult.f.) Lindl.; Fritillaria cuprea Graham; Cyclobothra propinqua S.Schauer; Fritillaria biflora Sessé & Moc. 1894, illegitimate homonym not Lindl. 1834; Calochortus barbatus subsp. chihuahuanus Painter; Calochortus barbatus var. chihuahuanus (Painter) J.F.Macbr.

= Calochortus barbatus =

Species of flowering plant

Calochortus barbatus is a species of mariposa lilies in the lily family. It is endemic to Mexico.

== Distribution ==
The bulb is widespread across much of montane Mexico, from Chihuahua in the northeast to Oaxaca in the southeast.

It is found in grasslands, and open oak and pine woods below 2,500 metres (8,200 ft) in elevation.

== Description ==
Calochortus barbatus is a bulb-forming perennial with branching stems up to 50 cm tall.

Flowers are nodding (hanging), and are yellow with yellow or purple hairs. The flowers are hermaphrodite, and are pollinated by insects.

== See also ==
- Sierra Madre de Oaxaca pine-oak forests
