= Fritillaria sichuanica =

Scientific classification
- Kingdom: Plantae
- Clade: Tracheophytes
- Clade: Angiosperms
- Clade: Monocots
- Order: Liliales
- Family: Liliaceae
- Subfamily: Lilioideae
- Tribe: Lilieae
- Genus: Fritillaria
- Subgenus: F. subg. Fritillaria
- Species: F. sichuanica

Binomial name
- Fritillaria sichuanica S.C. Chen

Synonyms
- Synonymy: Fritillaria chuanbeiensis Y.K. Yang et al.; Fritillaria chuanbeiensis var. huyabeimu Y.K. Yang & D.H. Jiang; Fritillaria cirrhosa var. ecirrhosa Franchet; Fritillaria fujiangensis Y.K. Yang et al.; Fritillaria glabra var. qingchuanensis (Y.K. Yang & J.K. Wu) S.Y. Tang & S.C. Yueh; Fritillaria mellea S.Y. Tang & S.C. Yueh; Fritillaria pingwuensis Y.K. Yang & J.K. Wu; Fritillaria przewalskii var. longistigma Y.K. Yang & J.K. Wu; Fritillaria qingchuanensis Y.K. Yang & J.K. Wu; Fritillaria taipaiensis var. zhouquensis S.C. Chen & G.D. Yu; Fritillaria wenxianensis Y.K. Yang & J.K. Wu; Fritillaria xibeiensis Y.K. Yang et al.

Species of flowering plant

Fritillaria sichuanica is a Chinese plant species of the lily family. It is found only in China, found in the Provinces of Gansu, Qinghai, and Sichuan. It belongs to subgenus Fritillaria.

Fritillaria sichuanica produces bulbs up to 20 mm in diameter. Stem is up to 50 cm tall. Flowers are nodding (hanging downwards), yellow-green with deep purple spots the spots sometimes so dense that the flower appears from a distance to be more purple than yellow-green.
