= Anstruther Davidson =

Botanist and naturalist (1860–1932)

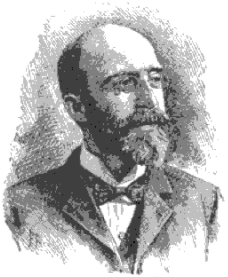
- Born: February 19, 1860; Watten, Highland, Scotland
- Died: April 3, 1932 (aged 72); Los Angeles
- Scientific career
- Fields: Dermatology, botany, and entomology
- Author abbrev. (botany): Davidson

Anstruther Davidson (1860–1932) was a Scottish-American physician, professor of medicine, botanist, and entomologist.

== Biography ==
Born in Scotland, Davidson attended the University of Glasgow, where he graduated CM MB in 1881 and received his higher MD in 1887. He served a medical internship in the Glasgow Western Infirmary and then went into private practice at Thornhill, Dumfriesshire. After some time spent in Vienna, he emigrated in 1889 to the United States. He practiced medicine in Los Angeles and published papers in medical journals. He became an associate professor of dermatology at the University of Southern California, while simultaneously studying natural history and publishing papers on botany and entomology.

After an extended stay in Clifton, Arizona, he published the first floristic account for that state and in 1923 collaborated with George L. Moxley to produce a flora of southern California. Davidson was particularly interested in the weeds of the Los Angeles area and published works such as "Changes in our weeds" (1907).

In 1897 he married Alice Jane Merritt (1859–1931), author of California Plants in Their Homes: A Botanical Reader for Children (1898).

Anstruther Davidson died at Good Samaritan Hospital in Los Angeles on April 3, 1932.

== Selected publications ==
- Catalogue of the plants of Los Angeles County. Part 1. Phanerogamia. 1896.
- Davidson, A. (1913). "Pellagra". California State Journal of Medicine. 11 (10): 420. PMC 1640845. PMID 18736069.
- with George L. Moxley: Flora of southern California. Times-mirror press. 1923.

== Eponyms ==
- Acmispon decumbens var. davidsonii (Greene) Govaerts
- Malvastrum davidsonii B.L.Rob.
