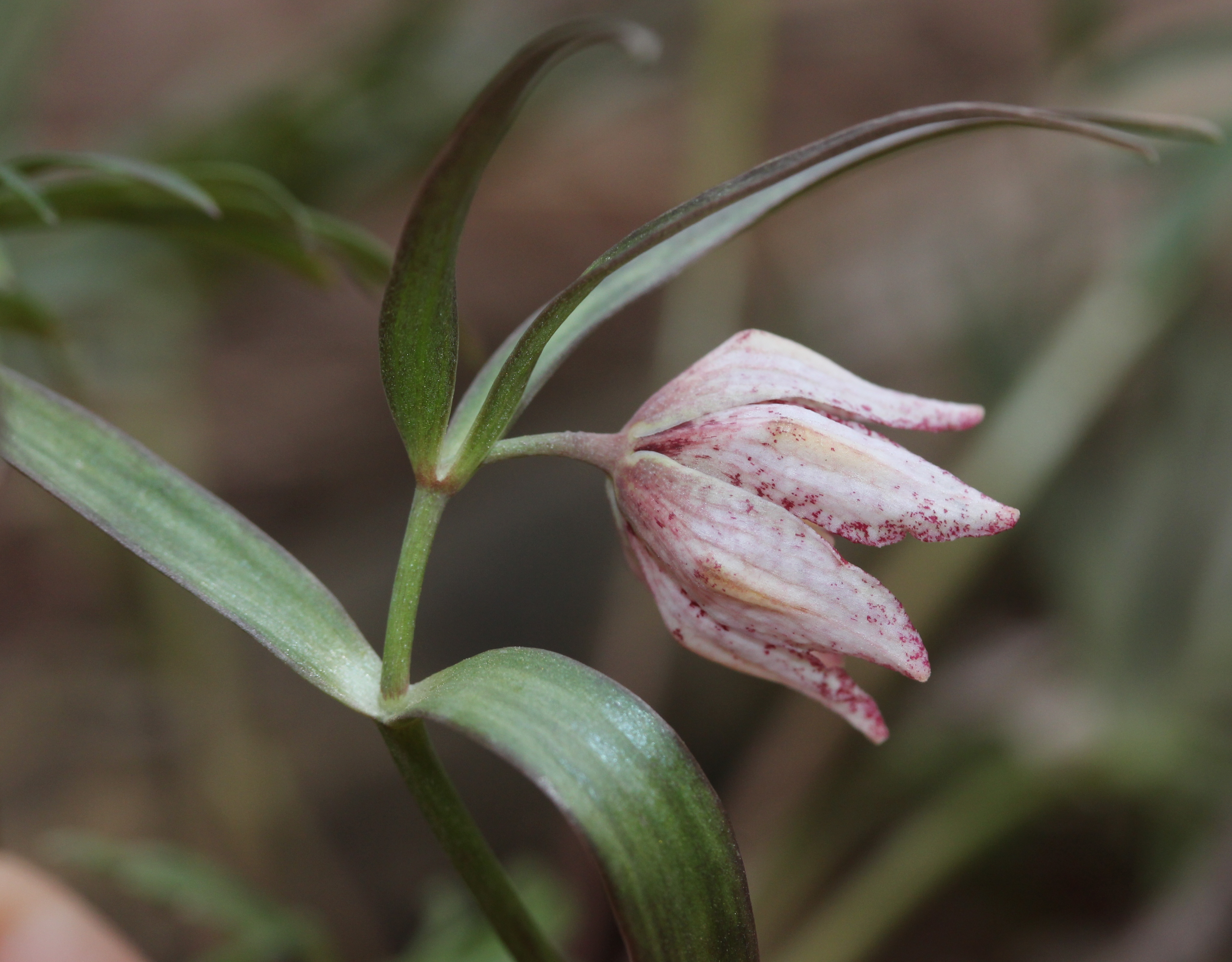

Scientific classification
- Kingdom: Plantae
- Clade: Tracheophytes
- Clade: Angiosperms
- Clade: Monocots
- Order: Liliales
- Family: Liliaceae
- Subfamily: Lilioideae
- Genus: Fritillaria
- Species: F. japonica

Binomial name
- Fritillaria japonica Miq.

= Fritillaria japonica =

Species of flowering plant

Fritillaria japonica (ミノコバイモ, minokobaimo) is a perennial herbaceous bulbous plant, endemic to Japan. It is a species in the genus Fritillaria, in the family Liliaceae. It is placed in the subgenus Japonica.

== Description ==
Fritillaria japonica is characterised by the presence of a distinctly divided style, having smooth tepal margins and nectaries and white anthers. The flower is campanulate.

Bulb c. 1 cm, stem 6–12 cm in height. Leaves lanceolate, about 6 cm in length. The lower leaves are opposite, the upper in a whorl of three. Flowers single, broad, campanulate, white with brown marking, unscented. Tepals 1.5–2 cm in length, nectaries yellow and 5–8 mm long, from angle of bell to apex. Style trifid (three-lobed) ovidistal 2 mm. Fruit a capsule not winged, tapering, apex to base, pendant at maturity. Seeds pear-shaped.

== Taxonomy ==
Fritillaria japonica was first described by Miquel in 1867, in his Prolusio Florae Japonicae. He provides the following description (in Latin) (Note: Caulis 5-pollicaris e bulbo vix maiore basi pauci-squamoso nudus, ....) — "Stem 5 thumb breadths, arising from a bulb of few scales and scarcely larger than a pea, with 4–5 leaves at its apex, lanceolate and tapering to a point at both ends; single nodding spreading-campanulate flower born on a pedicel; perigonium half a thumb breadth, pointed and recurved at the tip, the outside pale lilac and dotted, the inside dotted lemon yellow and blood red; anthers yellow and elliptical-oblong; stigma with three linear lobes." He ends with Ad iconem libri iaponici determinavi, alluding to the fact he had examined the illustration in Iinuma's Somoku-zusetsubook (1856).

When Baker (1874) divided Fritillaria into subgenera, he was unsure where to place F. japonica and listed it under Species dubiae. From then on there was considerable confusion as to the exact nature of the species and its taxonomic placement. It was not till 2001 that Rix placed all the endemic species of Japan into one subgenus, Japonica, a decision subsequently validated by molecular phylogenetic analysis. Long considered a variety of Fritillaria koidzumiana, it continues to be sold in horticulture as Fritillaria japonica koidzumiana.

== Distribution and habitat ==
Central and southwest Honshu, Japan. Found in peaty woodland soil.

== Bibliography ==
- Baker, J. G. (1874). "Revision of the Genera and Species of Tulipeae". Botanical Journal of the Linnean Society. XIV (76). F. sewerzowii p. 267. doi:10.1111/j.1095-8339.1874.tb00314.x.
- Hill, Laurence (2011). "A taxonomic history of Japanese endemic Fritillaria (Liliaceae)". Kew Bulletin. 66 (2): 227–240. doi:10.1007/s12225-011-9285-9. JSTOR 23044676. S2CID 23262059.
- Miquel, Friedrich Anton Wilhelm (1867). "Fritillaria japonica". Annales Musei botanici lugduno-batavi. 3 (5): 158.
- Rix, Martyn (2001). Fritillaria: A Revised Classification: Together with an Updated List of Species. Fritillaria Group of the Alpine Garden Society.
- Rønsted, N.; Law, S.; Thornton, H.; Fay, M. F.; Chase, M. W. (2005). "Molecular phylogenetic evidence for the monophyly of Fritillaria and Lilium (Liliaceae; Liliales) and the infrageneric classification of Fritillaria". Molecular Phylogenetics and Evolution. 35 (3): 509–527. doi:10.1016/j.ympev.2004.12.023. PMID 15878122.
- TPL (2013). "The Plant List 1.1: Fritillaria japonica Miq". Royal Botanic Gardens, Kew and Missouri Botanical Garden.
- WCSP. "Fritillaria japonica Miq.". World Checklist of Selected Plant Families (WCSP). Royal Botanic Gardens, Kew.
- IPNI (2005). "Fritillaria japonica Miq.". International Plant Names Index.
- Roskov Y.; Kunze T.; Orrell T.; Abucay L.; Paglinawan L.; Culham A.; Bailly N.; Kirk P.; Bourgoin T.; Baillargeon G.; Decock W.; De Wever A.; Didžiulis V., eds. (2014). "Fritillaria japonica Miq". Species 2000 & ITIS Catalogue of Life: 2014 Annual Checklist. Naturalis, Leiden, the Netherlands: ITIS, Royal Botanic Gardens, Kew.
- "Fritillaria japonica Miq". eMonocot. Royal Botanic Gardens, Kew.
- "Fritillaria japonica". Fritillaria species: A. Fritillaria Group, Alpine Garden Society.
  - AGS (2011). "Fritillaria japonica". Plant Encyclopaedia. Alpine Garden Society.
- PBS (25 July 2015). "Fritillaria japonica". Asian Fritillaria. Pacific Bulb Society.
