= Coins of the Rhodesian pound =

The coins of the Rhodesian pound were part of the currency of Southern Rhodesia, which changed its name to Rhodesia, following the break-up of the Federation of Rhodesia and Nyasaland, when the Rhodesian pound replaced the Rhodesia and Nyasaland pound, which had replaced the Southern Rhodesian pound.

== Pre-UDI colonial coinage ==
In 1964, a series of coins was struck for the Reserve Bank of Rhodesia at the South African Mint in Pretoria.

They consisted of the following;

- sixpence (6^{d}) bearing a flame lily design on the reverse
- shilling (1/-) bearing the Rhodesian shield on the reverse
- florin (2/-) bearing the Zimbabwe Bird on the reverse
- half crown (2/6) bearing a Sable Antelope on the reverse

These coins are interesting in two respects. First, Rhodesia was the first of two countries to utilise Arnold Machin's portrait of Queen Elizabeth II on pre-decimal coinage (the other country was The Gambia in 1966 and 1970). Secondly, the coins were dual-denominated (with 5c, 10c, 20c and 25c, representing their equivalents in South African rand). This was not only to familiarise the public with the decimal system, but also to allow the coins to remain legal tender after the forthcoming change over to decimal currency.

All these coins had the title of Queen Elizabeth II in English, rather than in Latin, as had been the case on the coins of Rhodesia and Nyasaland and Southern Rhodesia.

Tommy Sasseen was the designer of the reverses of these coins - and the designer of both sides of the coins of the Rhodesian dollar as well.

== UDI-period coinage ==
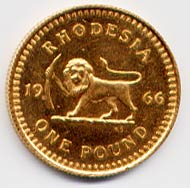
Gold £1 coin, Rhodesia, 1966.

On November 11, 1965, Rhodesia was declared by Prime Minister Ian Smith to be an independent Dominion. This led to sanctions being imposed by both the British Commonwealth and the United Nations, as the Unilateral Declaration of Independence (UDI) was not recognized as legitimate.

In 1966, the 'rebel' Rhodesian Government decided to issue a set of gold coins to commemorate the first anniversary of the UDI. These consisted of three denominations:

- ten shillings (bearing a sable antelope on the reverse) (click for obverse image) (click for reverse image);

- one pound - 5000 minted (bearing the "lion and tusk" armorial crest of Rhodesia on the reverse)

(click for obverse image) (click for reverse image); and

- five pounds - 3000 minted (bearing the coat of arms of Rhodesia on the reverse)

(click for obverse image) (click for reverse image);

all of which were identical in weight, size and gold content to the British sovereign, half-sovereign and five pound coin. These coins were issued singly and in a set of three, in cases inscribed RESERVE BANK OF RHODESIA. These coins, like the 1964 issue, were struck at the South African Mint in Pretoria.

In 1968, the Rhodesian threepence (or tickey) was struck. This was not dual-denominated. This coin was replaced by the 2-1/2 Cents in 1970.

== See also ==
- Coins of the Rhodesian dollar
