= Bulb =

Short plant stem with fleshy leaves or leaf bases for food storage and water

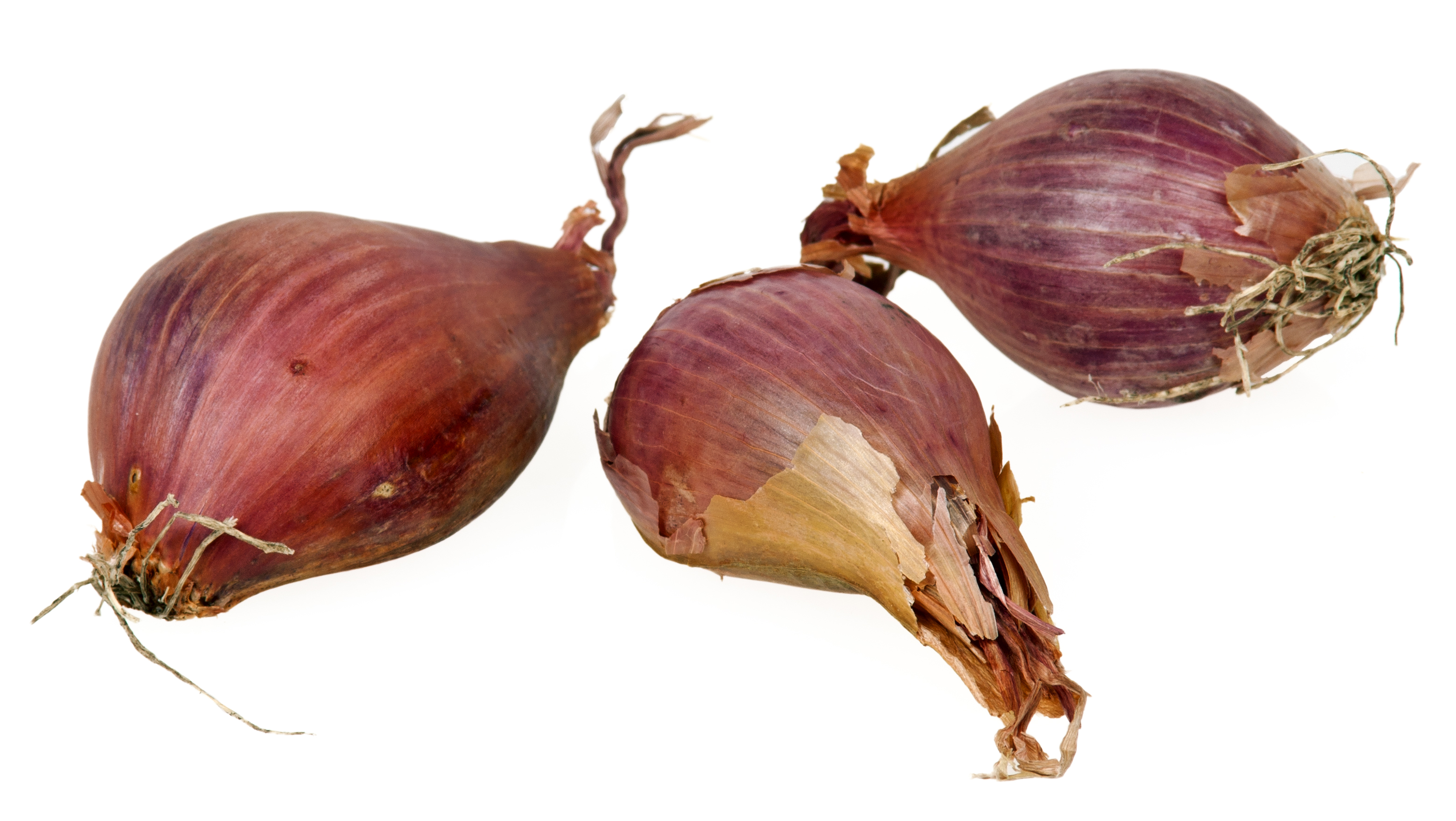
Shallot bulbs

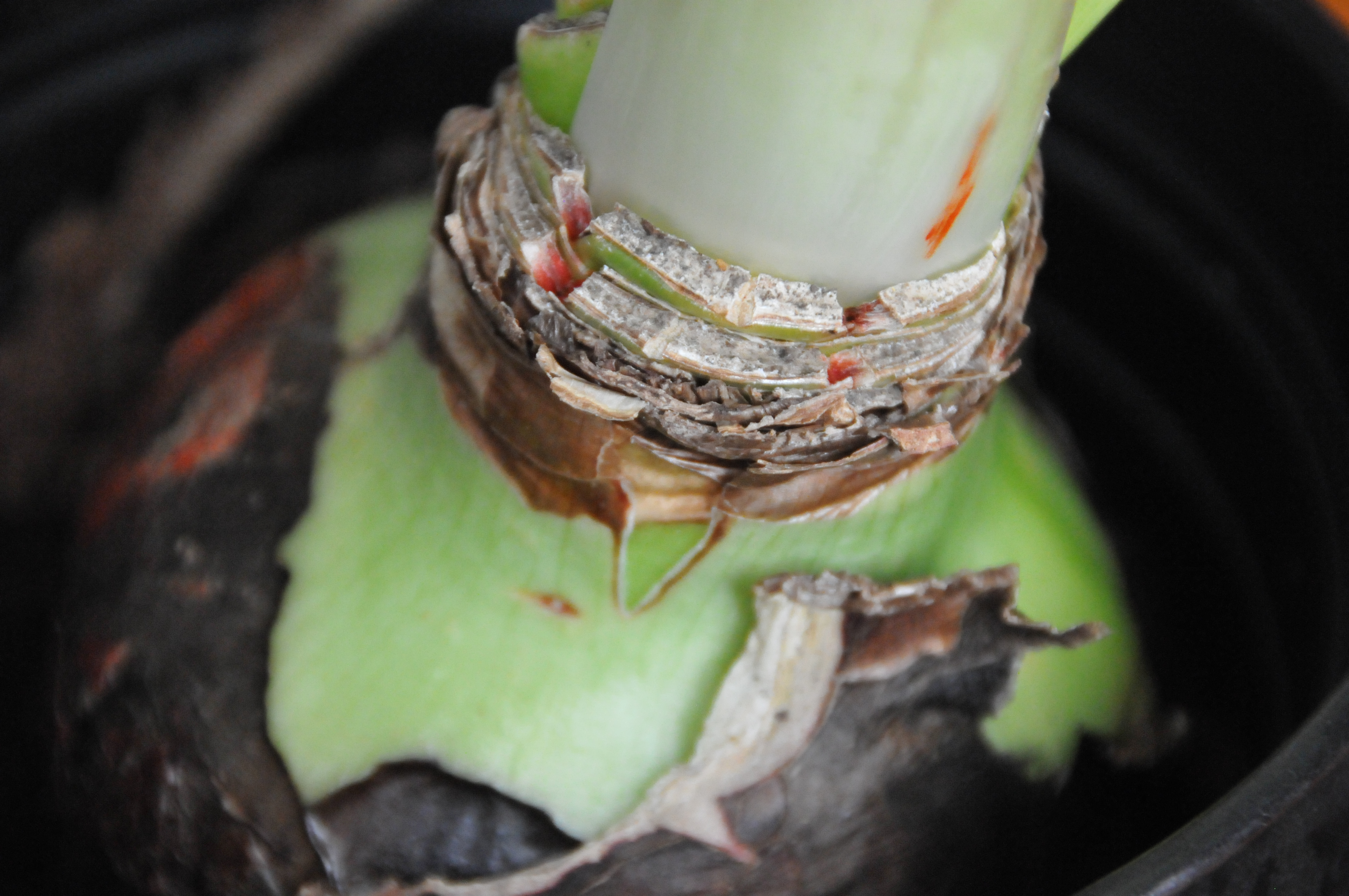
Hippeastrum (amaryllis) bulb

In botany, a bulb is a short underground stem with fleshy leaves or leaf bases that function as food storage organs during dormancy. In gardening, plants with other kinds of storage organs are also called ornamental bulbous plants or just bulbs.

== Description ==
Longitudinal section through bulb

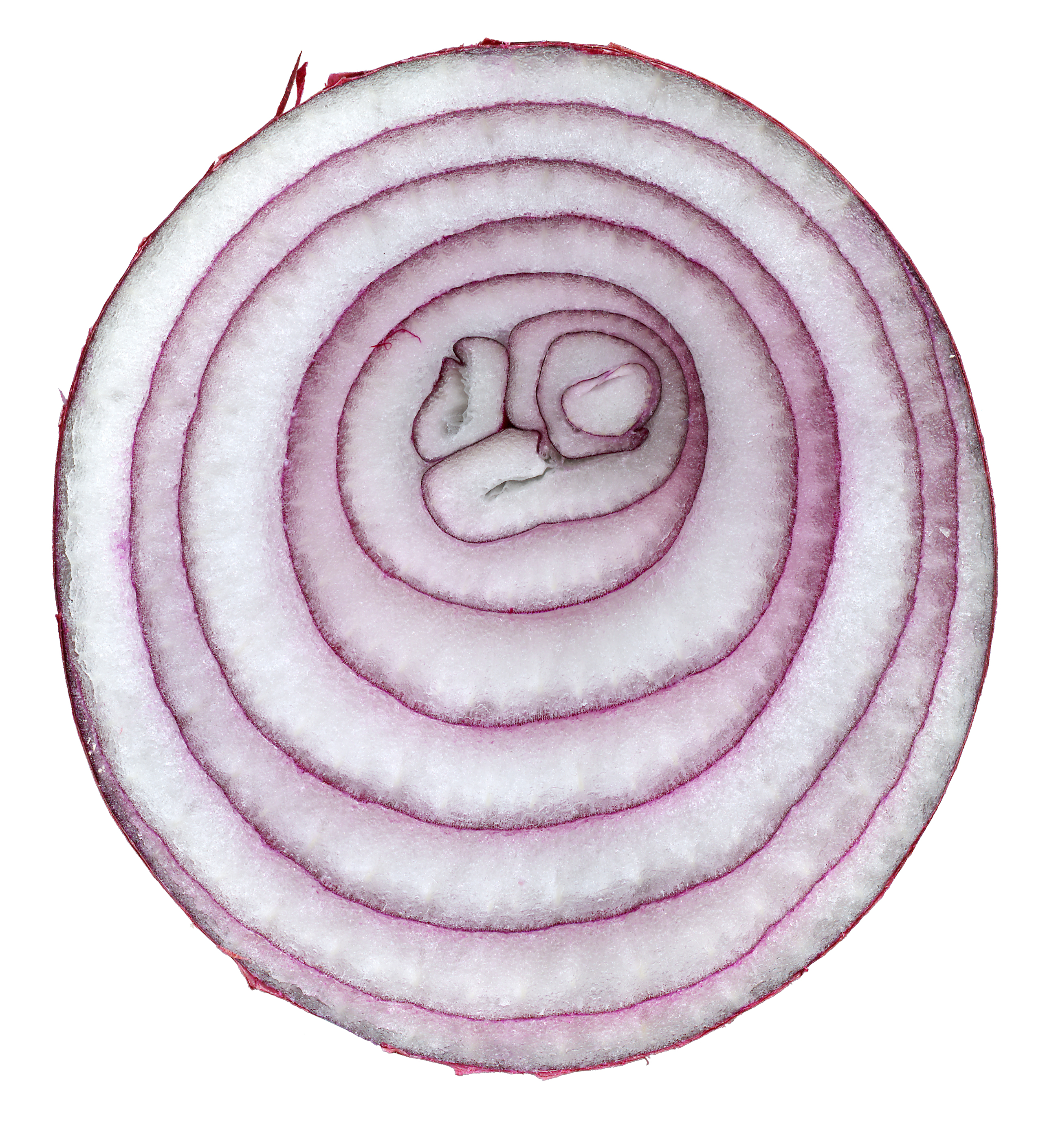
Cross section of onion bulb

The bulb's leaf bases, also known as scales, generally do not support leaves, but contain food reserves to enable the plant to survive adverse conditions. At the center of the bulb is a vegetative shoot. The base is formed by a reduced stem, and plant growth occurs from this basal plate. Roots emerge from the underside of the base, and new stems and leaves from the upper side. Tunicate bulbs have dry, membranous outer scales that protect the continuous lamina of fleshy scales. Species in the genera Allium, Hippeastrum, Narcissus, and Tulipa all have tunicate bulbs. Non-tunicate bulbs, such as Lilium and Fritillaria species, lack the protective tunic and have looser scales.

Bulbous plant species cycle through vegetative and reproductive growth stages; the bulb grows to flowering size during the vegetative stage and the plant flowers during the reproductive stage. Certain environmental conditions are needed to trigger the transition from one stage to the next, such as the shift from a cold winter to spring. Once the flowering period is over, the plant enters a foliage period of about six weeks during which time the plant absorbs nutrients from the soil and energy from the sun for setting flowers for the next year. Vegetative bulbs may be planted like seeds and will sprout into plants. Bulbs dug up before the foliage period is completed will not bloom the following year but then should flower normally in subsequent years.

== Plants that form bulbs ==
Plants that form underground storage organs, including bulbs as well as tubers and corms, are called geophytes. Some epiphytic orchids (family Orchidaceae) form above-ground storage organs called pseudobulbs, that superficially resemble bulbs.

Nearly all plants that form true bulbs are monocotyledons, and include:

- Amaryllis, Crinum, Hippeastrum, Narcissus, and several other members of the amaryllis family Amaryllidaceae. This includes onion, garlic, and other alliums, members of the Amaryllid subfamily Allioideae.
- Lily, tulip, and many other members of the lily family Liliaceae.
- Two groups of Iris species, family Iridaceae: subgenus Xiphium (the "Dutch" irises) and subgenus Hermodactyloides (the miniature "rock garden" irises).

The only eudicot plants that produce true bulbs are just a few species in the genus Oxalis, such as Oxalis latifolia.

== Bulbil ==
A bulbil is a small bulb, and may also be called a bulblet, bulbet, or bulbel.

Small bulbs can develop or propagate a large bulb. If one or several moderate-sized bulbs form to replace the original bulb, they are called renewal bulbs. Increase bulbs are small bulbs that develop either on each of the leaves inside a bulb, or else on the end of small underground stems connected to the original bulb.

Some lilies, such as the tiger lily Lilium lancifolium, form small bulbs, called bulbils, in their leaf axils. Several members of the onion family, Alliaceae, including Allium sativum (garlic), form bulbils in their flower heads, sometimes as the flowers fade, or even instead of the flowers (which is a form of apomixis). The so-called tree onion (Allium × proliferum) forms small onions which are large enough for pickling.

Some ferns, such as the hen-and-chicken fern, produce new plants at the tips of the fronds' pinnae that are sometimes referred to as bulbils.

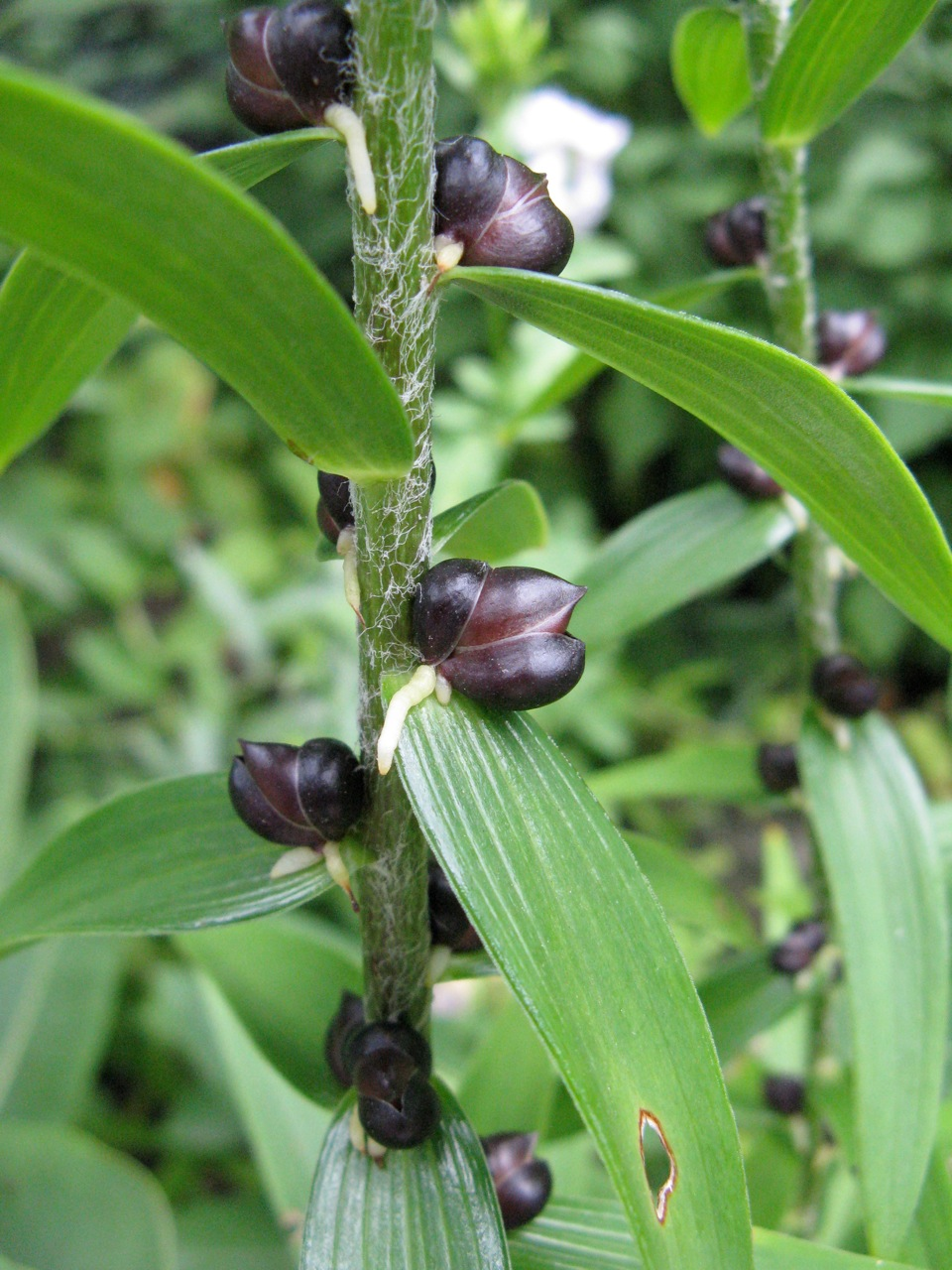
Bulbils form in the leaf axils of Lilium lancifolium

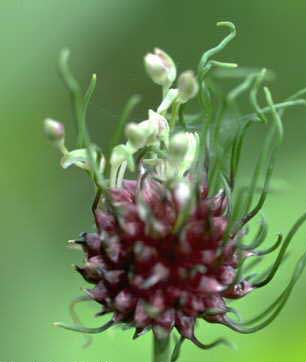
Wild garlic (Allium vineale) bulbils sprouting

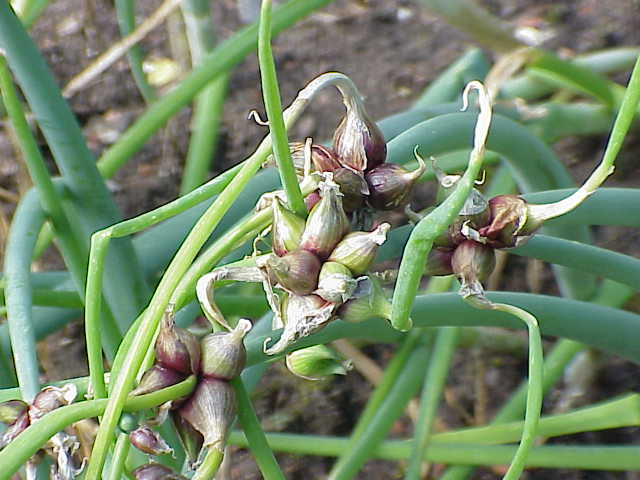
"Tree onions" form clusters of small bulbs instead of flowers

== See also ==
- List of flower bulbs
