= List of flower bulbs =

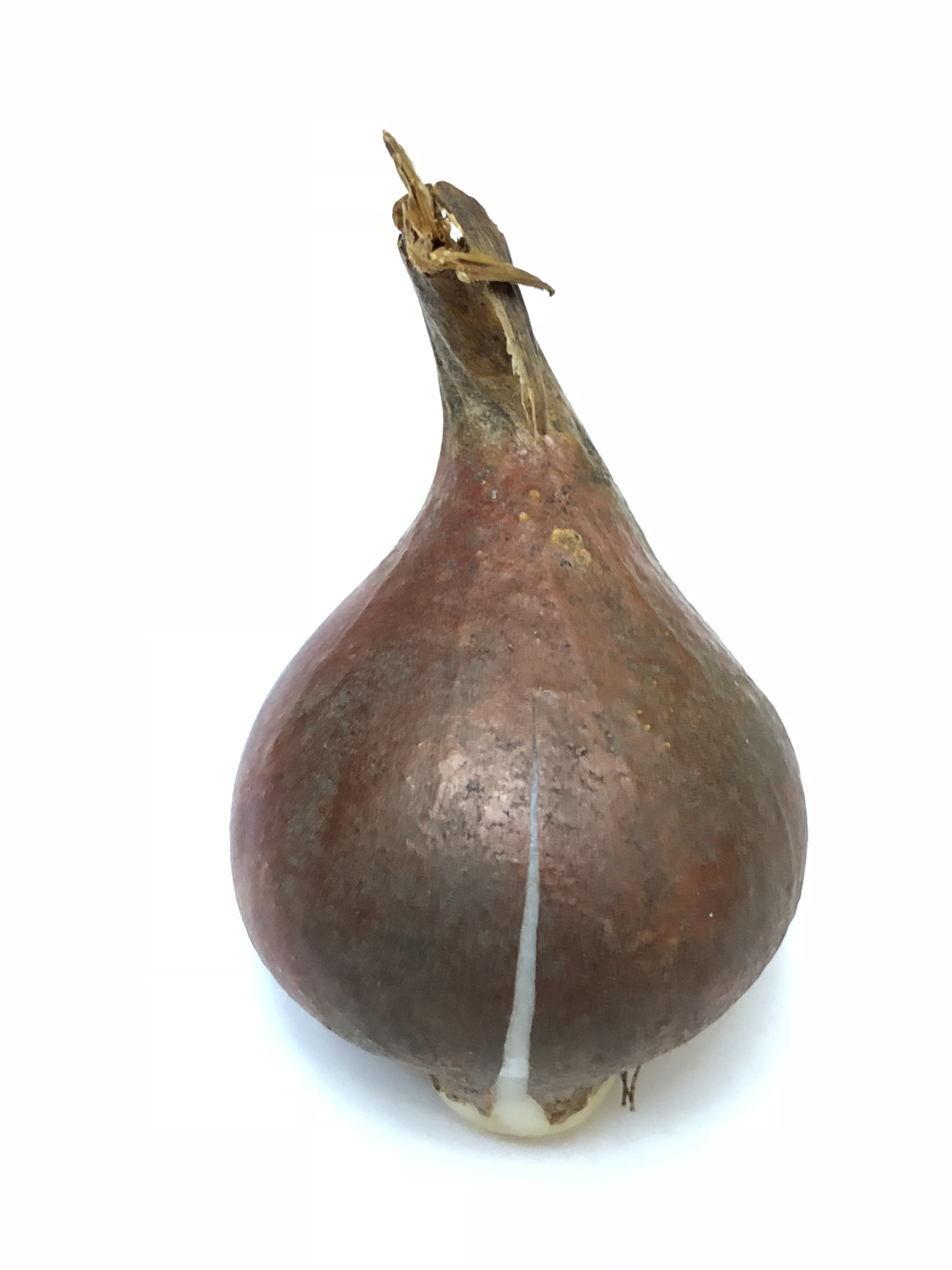
Tulip bulb

List of flower bulbs is a list of flowering plants which come from ornamental bulbs. Most flower bulbs produce perennial flowers and in cold zones the bulbs are left in the ground year-round.

== Bulb planting ==
Flowering plant bulbs are planted beneath the surface of the earth. The bulbs need some exposure to cold temperatures for 12 to 14 weeks in order to bloom. Flower bulbs are generally planted in the fall in colder climates. The bulbs go dormant in the winter but they continue to absorb water and nutrients from the soil and they develop roots. Most bulbs produce perennial flowers. Occasionally certain bulbs become crowded in the ground and they must be removed and separated. These include: amaryllis (Hippeastrum spp.) and cyclamen (Cyclamen persicum).

=== Warm weather ===
Some flower bulbs do well in hot climates: Lilies, Caladiums, Dahlias, Gladiolus, Narcissus (plant) and daffodils. To grow cold weather flower bulbs like Tulips and crocus in hot climates, gardeners must dig up the bulbs and store them in the cold for 3-4 months before replanting.

== A ==
- Allium siculum
- Agapanthus (Blue White and Dwarf)
- Albuca nelsonii
- Allium tuberosum
- Alocasia (Elephants Ears)
- Alrawia
- Alstroemeria (Peruvian Lily)
- Amarcrinum (Amaryllis x Crinum)
- Amaryllis belladonna
- Amorphophallus
- Androstephium
- Anemone (Wood Anemone)
- Anomatheca
- Anthericum (St Bernards Lily)
- Arisaema
- Arum
- Asarum
- Autonoe

== B ==
- Babiana (Baboon Flower)
- Begonia
- Bessera
- Bletilla (Chinese Ground Orchid)
- Boophone
- Bomarea
- Bowiea (Sea Onion)
- Brunsvigia
- Bulbinella

== C ==
- Caladium
- Calochortus
- Cardiocrinum giganteum (Giant Himalayan Lily)
- Ceropegia (String of hearts)
- Chlidanthus
- Scilla luciliae
- Colocasia (Elephants Ears)
- Convallaria (Lily of the Valley)
- Corydalis
- Crinum
- Crocosmia
- Crocus
- Cyclamen
- Curtonus

== D ==
- Dahlia Tubers
- Daffodils
- Dierama
- Disporopsis
- Dracunculus vulgaris
- Drimiopsis
- Dodecatheon (Shooting Stars)

== E ==
- Eremurus (Foxtail Lily)
- Eucomis (Pineapple Lily)

== F ==
- Ferraria
- Freesia
- Fritillaria

== G ==
- Galanthus (Snowdrops)
- Galtonia (summer hyacinth)
- Geissorhiza
- Geranium
- Gladiolus
- Gloriosa (plant) (Glory lily)
- Gloxinia

== H ==
- Haemanthus
- Haemodorum
- Habenaria (Egret orchid or Bog Orchid)
- Hedychium (Ginger Lily)
- Hesperantha (Evening Flower)
- Hippeastrum
- Hyacinth
- Hyacinthoides (Bluebells)
- Hymenocallis (Spider Lily)

== I ==
- Incarvillea (Garden Gloxinia)
- Iris
- Ixia

== J ==
- Jonquils

== K ==
- Kohleria

== L ==
- Lachenalia
- Ledebouria
- Leucojum (Snowflakes)
- Liatris (Blazing Star or Gay Feather)
- Lilium (Asiatic)
- Littonia
- Lycoris

== M ==
- Mirabilis (Four o’clock flower)
- Moraea (Cape Tulips)
- Muscari

== N ==
- Narcissus (plant)
- Nerine

== O ==
- Ornithogalum
- Oxalis

== P ==
- Pasithea
- Pelargonium
- Pleione (Rockery Orchid)
- Polianthes (Tuberosa)
- Puschkinia

== R ==
- Ranunculus
- Resnova
- Rhodohypoxis

== S ==
- Sandersonia
- Sauromatum
- Saxifraga
- Scadoxus
- Schizostylis (Kaffir Lilies)
- Scilla
- Sinningia
- Sisyrinchium
- Sparaxis (Harlequin Flower)
- Sprekelia (Jacobean Lily)
- Sternbergia (Winter Daffodil)

== T ==
- Tacca (Bat Plant)
- Tigridia
- Trillium
- Triteleia
- Tropaeolum
- Tulbaghia
- Tulip

== U ==
- Uvularia
- Urceolina

== V ==
- Veltheimia

== W ==
- Watsonia (plant)

== Z ==
- Zantedeschia
- Zephyranthes

== Other ==
In addition to flowers, some vegetables have bulbs and they include, garlic, Onions and shallots. Some other plant roots which bear a similarity to bulbs include: corms, tubers, tuberous roots and rhizomes.

== See also ==
- Ornamental bulbous plant
