= Coins of the Rhodesian dollar =

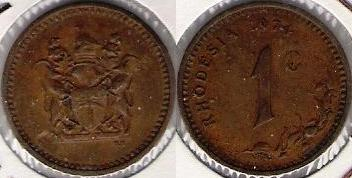
Rhodesian one cent piece, minted in 1974

The historical Rhodesian dollar was subdivided into a number of smaller values that were issued as coins. All Rhodesian decimal coins were designed by Tommy Sasseen and struck at the South African Mint in Pretoria. They replaced the coins of the Rhodesian pound.

In late June 1969, Rhodesian voters agreed to adopt a new constitution which would establish a republic (1969 Rhodesian constitutional referendum); the country had previously been in the Commonwealth of Nations under the British monarchy. On 17 February 1970, Rhodesia changed over to decimal currency. The Federation of Rhodesia and Nyasaland halfpenny and penny were withdrawn from circulation and replaced with the 1/2 cent coin, 1 cent coin (click for image) (their values were not exactly equal) and a 2 1/2 cent (3d) tickey. The new coins depicted the Rhodesian coat of arms on the obverse instead of Queen Elizabeth II's portrait, reflecting the de facto constitutional change. The 1964 coinage issue remained in circulation. The sixpence (6d) became 5 cents, the shilling (1/-) became 10 cents, the florin (2/-) became 20 cents, and the half-crown (2/6) became 25 cents.

In 1973, a new cupronickel five cent coin was issued. This coin had the Rhodesian coat of arms alone on the obverse, to which the legend RHODESIA was added for the 1975–77 strikings. In 1975 a new ten cent and 25 cent piece appeared; it was struck in this year only. A new 20 cent coin was struck in 1975 and again in 1977.

The last Rhodesian coins were struck in 1977. The 1977 1/2 cent coin is extremely rare, with 10 pieces known. Following independence under majority rule in 1980 as Zimbabwe, the Rhodesian dollar was withdrawn in late 1980 and replaced by the Zimbabwean dollar at par.

== See also ==
- Coins of the Rhodesian pound
