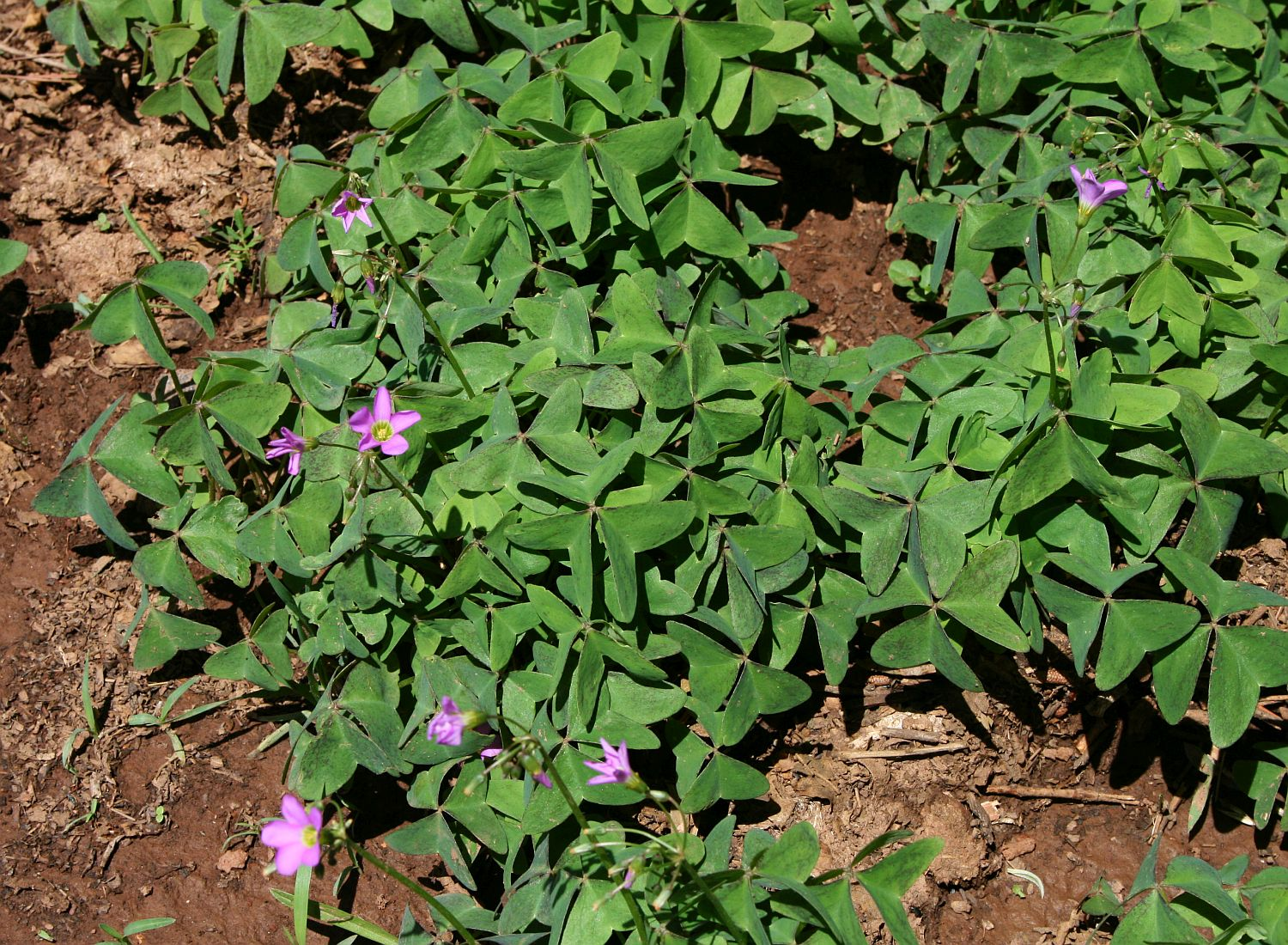

Scientific classification
- Kingdom: Plantae
- Clade: Embryophytes
- Clade: Tracheophytes
- Clade: Spermatophytes
- Clade: Angiosperms
- Clade: Eudicots
- Clade: Rosids
- Order: Oxalidales
- Family: Oxalidaceae
- Genus: Oxalis
- Species: O. latifolia

Binomial name
- Oxalis latifolia Kunth

= Oxalis latifolia =

Species of flowering plant

Oxalis latifolia is a species of flowering plant in the woodsorrel family known by the common names garden pink-sorrel and broadleaf woodsorrel. It is native to Mexico and parts of Central and South America. However, it has propagated to other parts of the world.

== Description ==
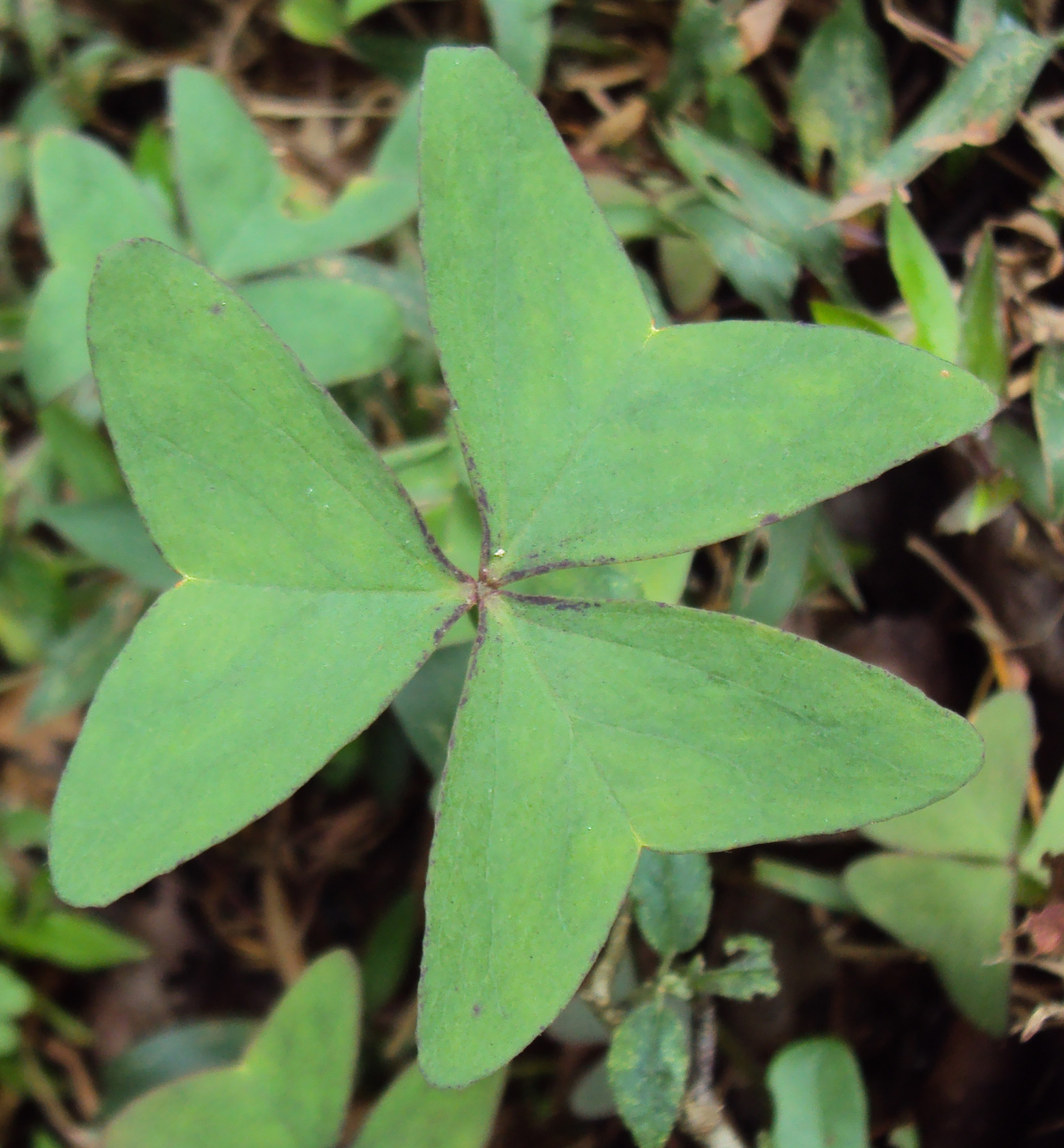
Leaf detail

This is a perennial herb growing from a system of small bulbs and spreading via stolons. There is no stem. The leaves arise on long petioles from ground level, each made up of three widely heart-shaped leaflets about 4.5 centimeters wide.

The inflorescence is an array of several flowers, each with five pink petals (some varieties have white flowers).

=== Invasive species ===
It is known on most other continents as an introduced species and a noxious weed and invasive species, as it infests many types of agricultural crops.

In south-eastern Australia, it is found in gardens, on roadsides, disturbed sites and is most likely a garden escape. It is spread by conveyance of soils containing the plant’s bulbils, as well as by runoffs, ants, and by larger animals like dogs and birds.

== Gallery ==
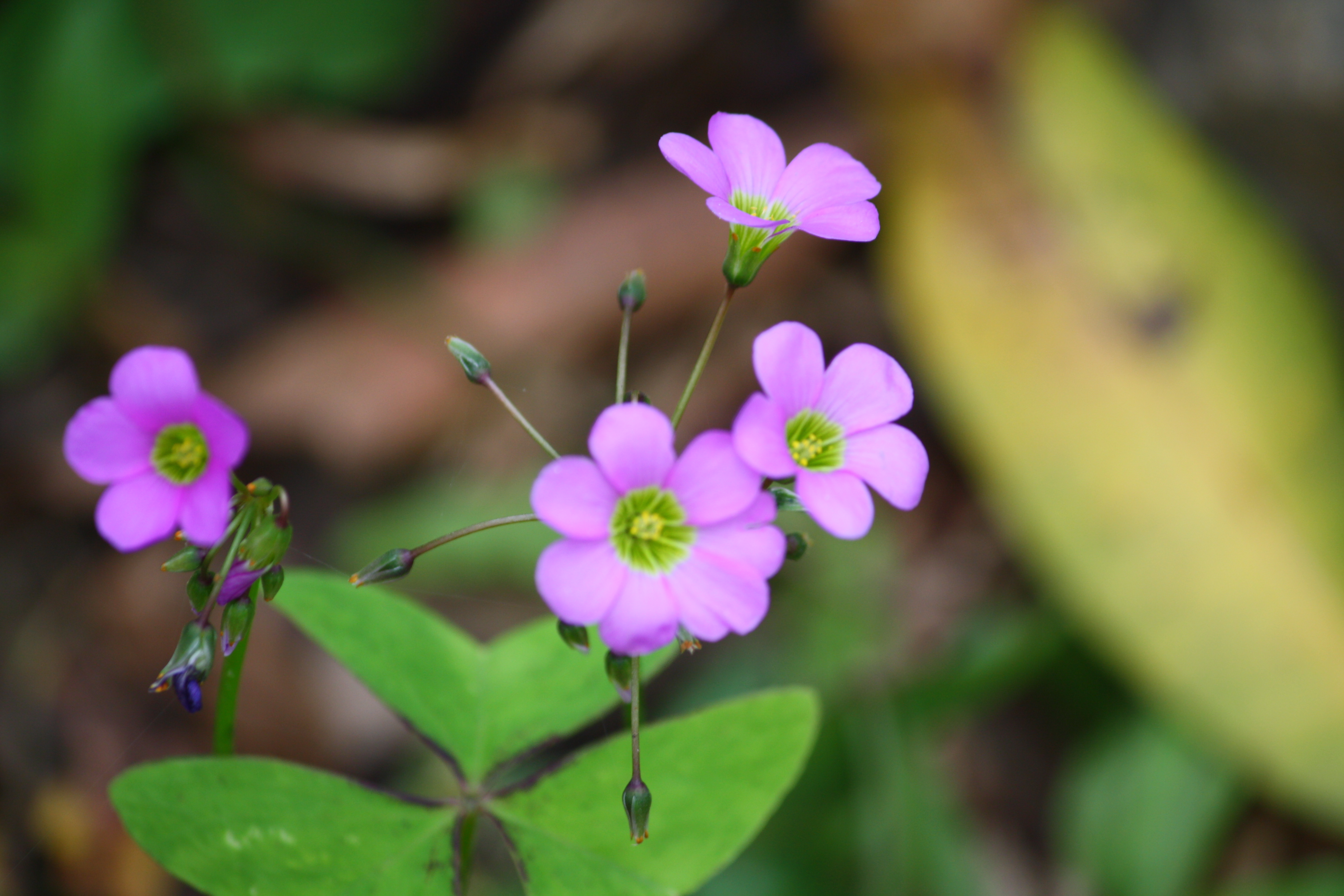
Pink flowers

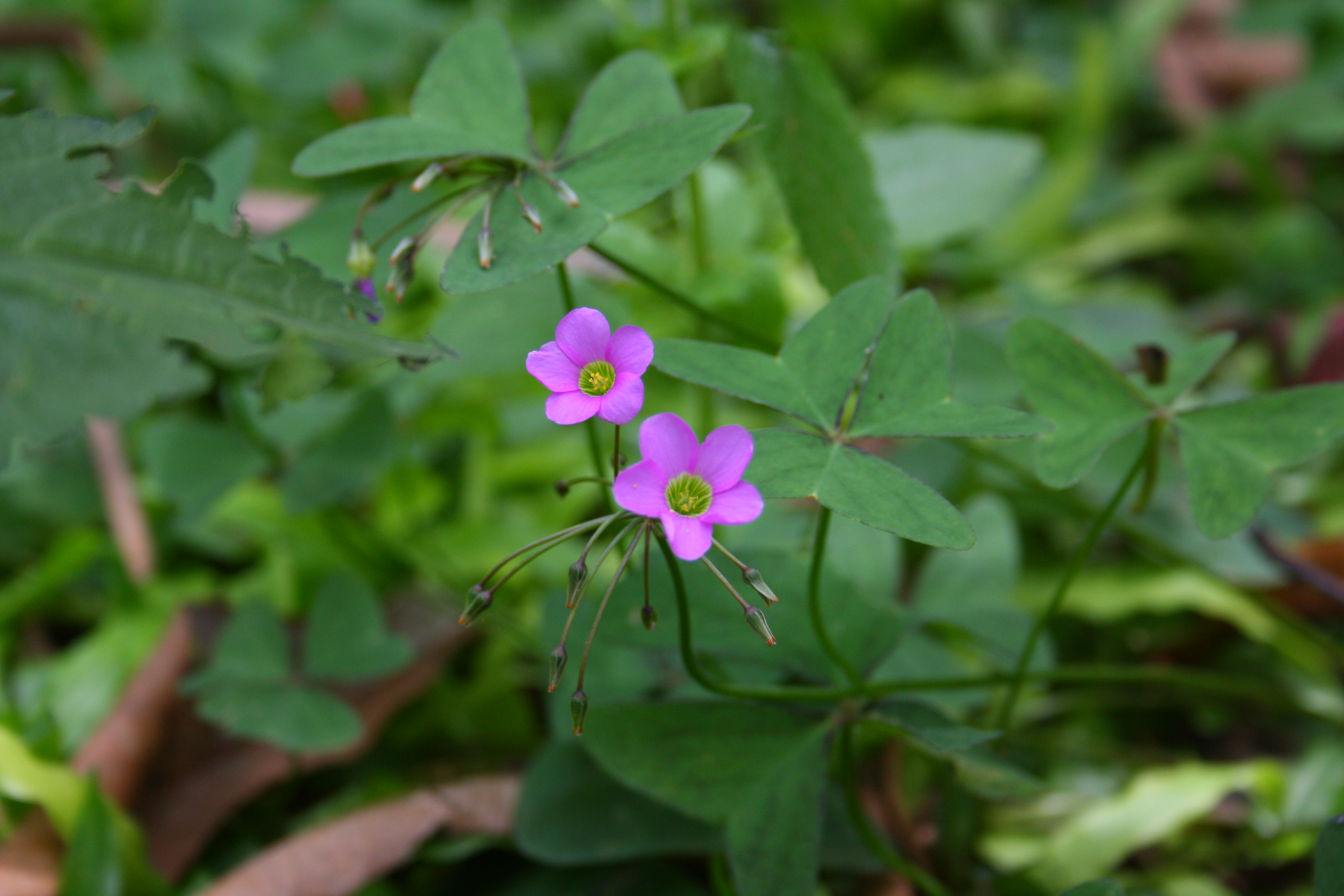

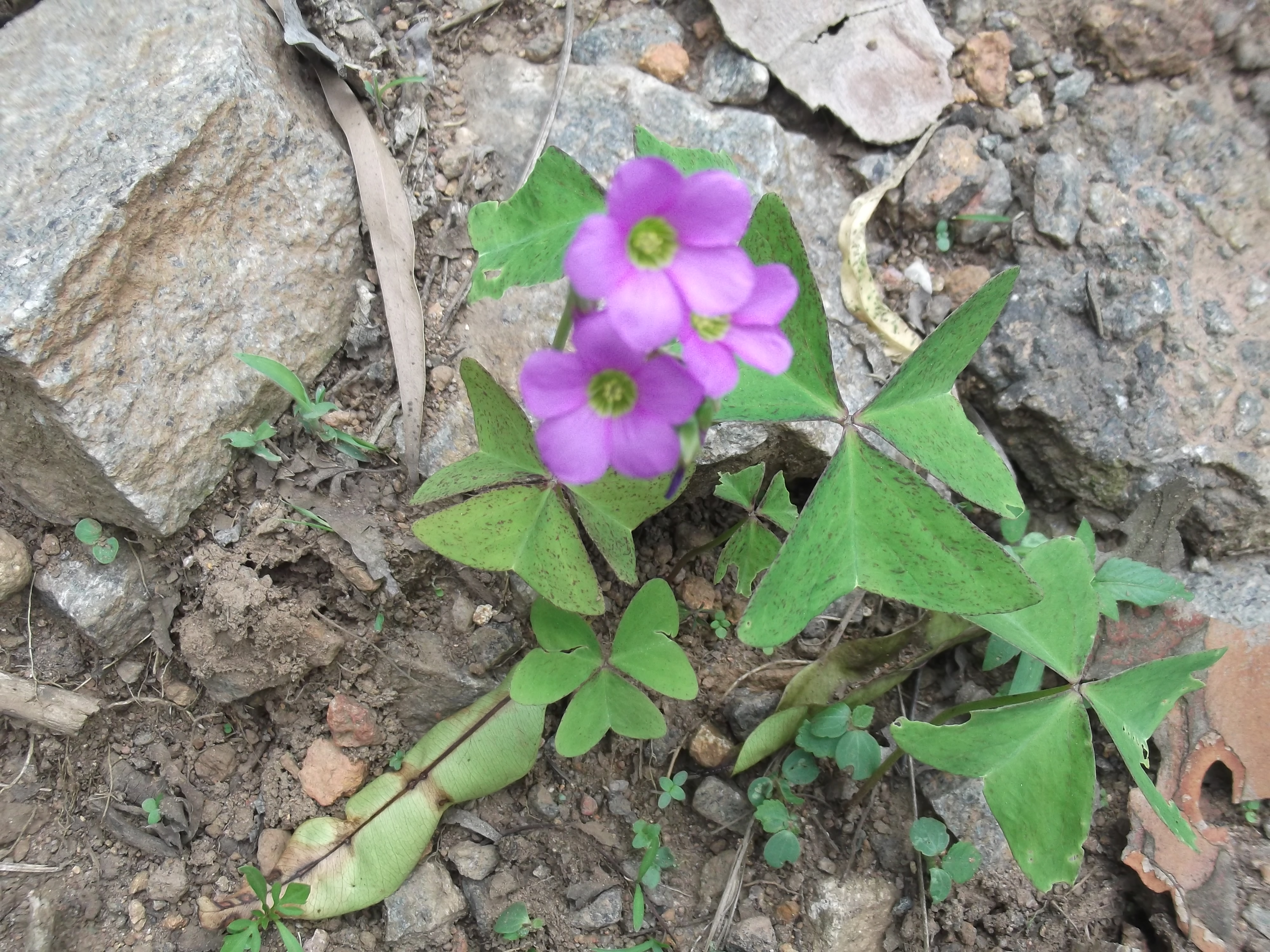
Roadside in India

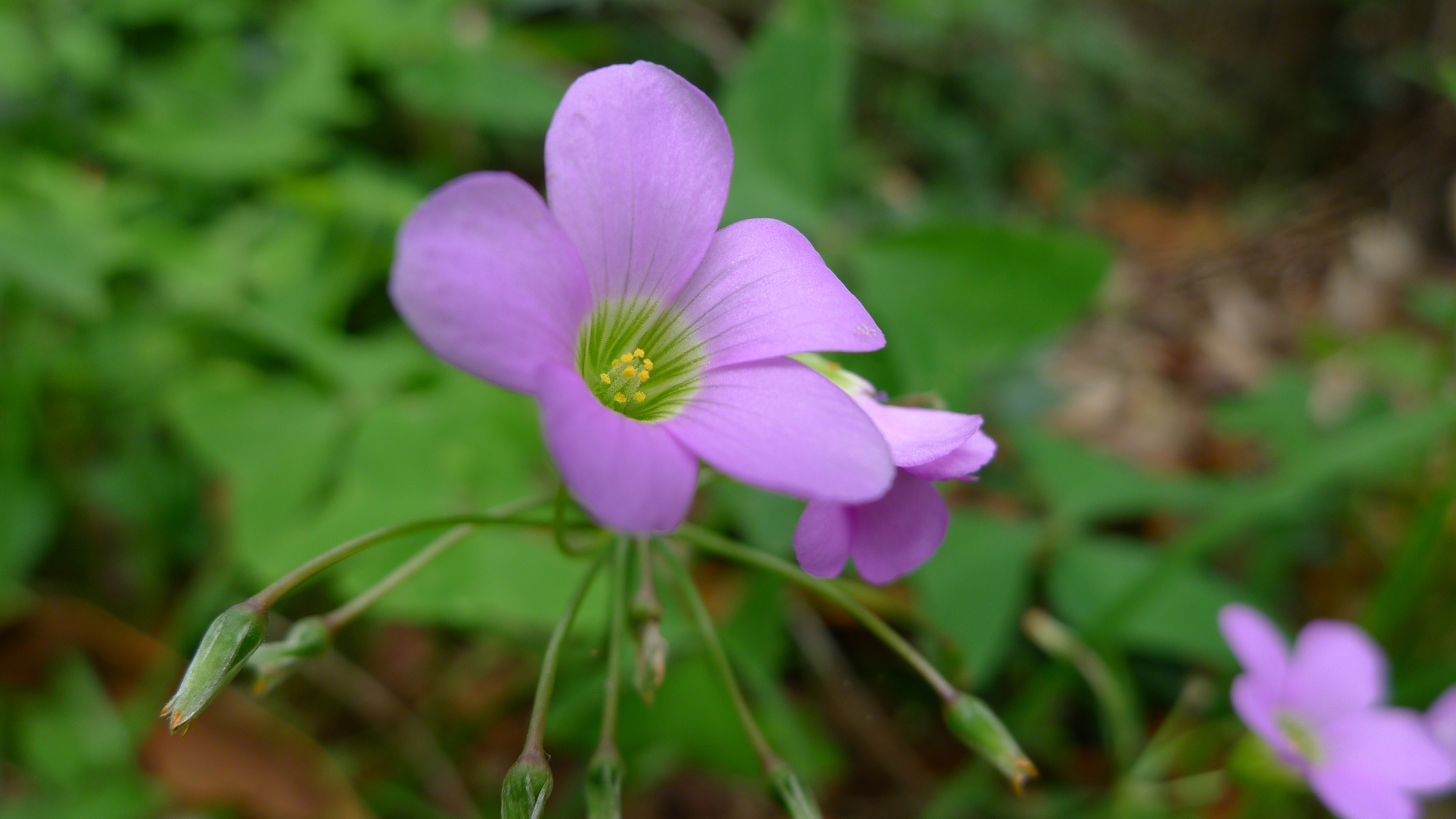
Flower detail in Como, New South Wales

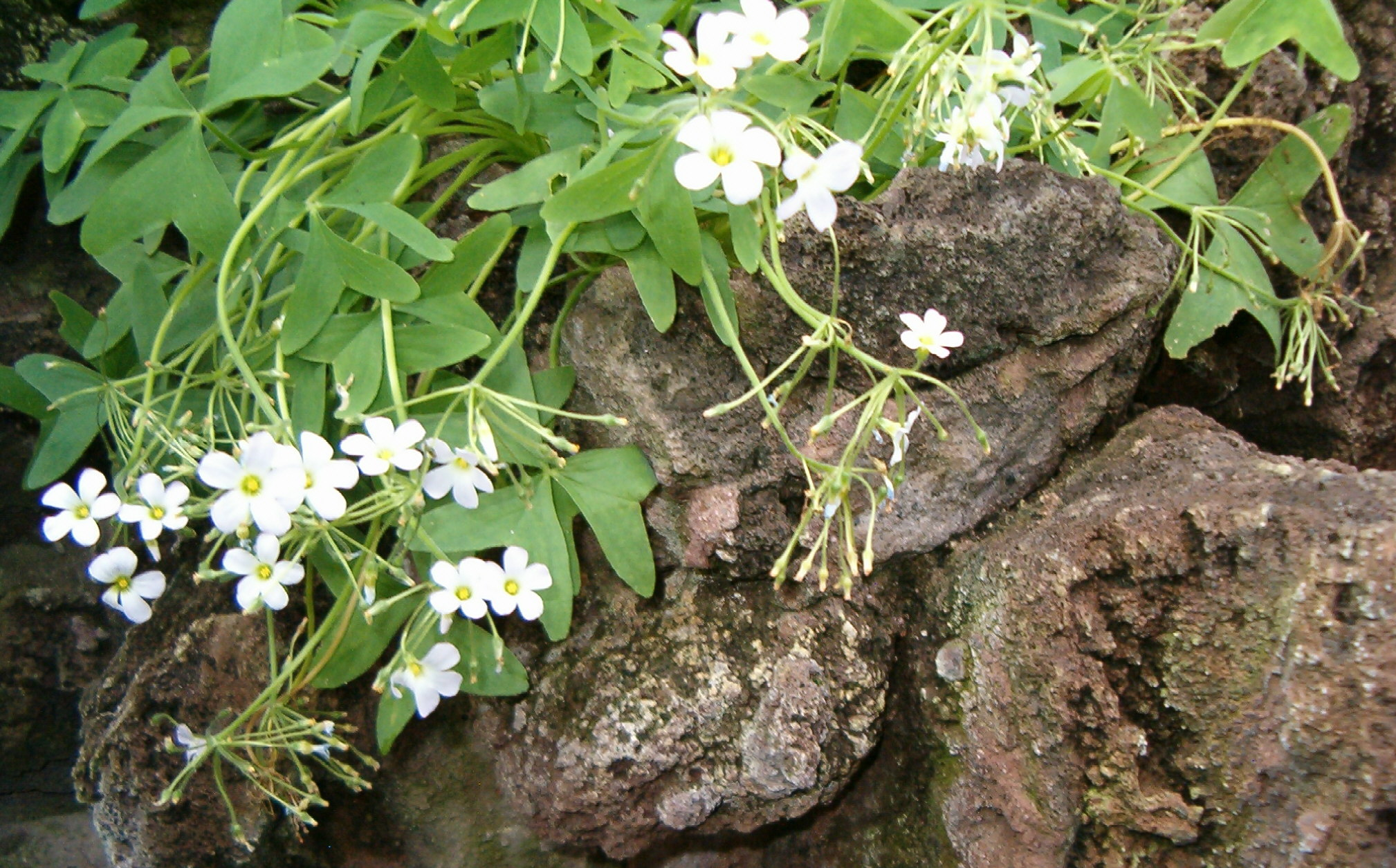
White flower variety
