= Pacific Bulb Society =

- Abbreviation: PBS
- Type: nonprofit
- Website: Pacific Bulb Society

The Pacific Bulb Society (PBS) is a nonprofit organization, founded in 2002, dedicated to informing and helping people who grow or are interested in flowering bulbs and other geophytes. Despite the name "Pacific", the society covers geophytes from around the world, and is open to people from any country. Members range from casual gardeners to professional botanists employed by major botanical gardens.

== About ==
The PBS maintains a "massive" online encyclopedia about bulbs with "an absolute wealth of images and information" stored in a Wiki that is accessible to the general public. Other topics covered in the wiki include cultivation tips, information on bulb-growing climates, sources for geophytes, a bibliography of books about geophytes, and a section on "legacy" bulbs that outlast their original homes. The society also runs an active online e-mail discussion group, "The PBS List," that is open to anyone, whether or not they are a PBS member. People can join the list to ask questions or share information about bulbs.

Paid members of the society receive a quarterly print publication, and can participate in exchanges of seeds and dormant bulbs several times a month. The exchanges sometimes include rare and unusual species.
