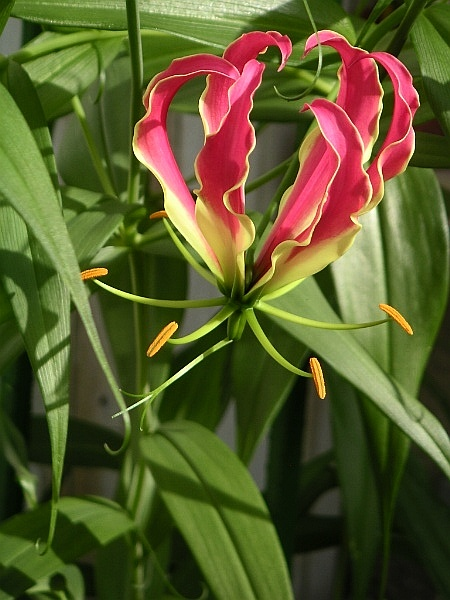
- Gloriosa superba

Scientific classification
- Kingdom: Plantae
- Clade: Tracheophytes
- Clade: Angiosperms
- Clade: Monocots
- Order: Liliales
- Family: Colchicaceae
- Genus: Gloriosa; L.

Type species
- Gloriosa superba L.

Synonyms
- Methonica Gagnebin.; Mendoni Adans.; Eugone Salisb.; Clinostylis Hochst.; Littonia Hook.

= Gloriosa (plant) =

Genus of plants

Gloriosa is a genus of 12 species in the plant family Colchicaceae, and includes the formerly recognised genus Littonia. They are native in tropical and southern Africa to Asia, and naturalised in Australia and the Pacific as well as being widely cultivated.

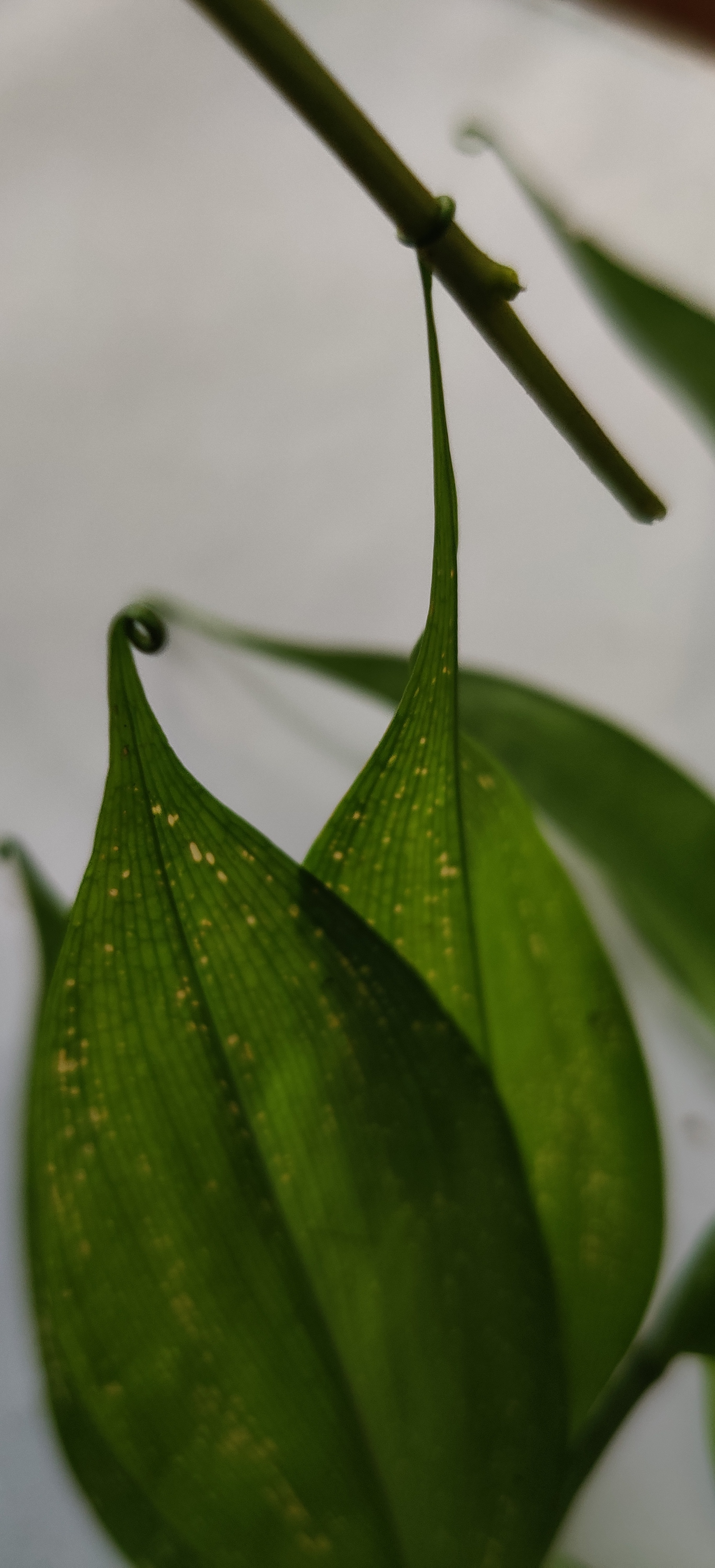
The leaf tips are modified to form tendrils

They are tender, tuberous rooted deciduous perennials, adapted to monsoon rainfall with a dormant dry season. All parts of the plant contain colchicine and related alkaloids and are therefore dangerously toxic if ingested, and contact with the stems and leaves can cause skin irritation. Various preparations of the plant are used in traditional medicines for a variety of complaints in both Africa and Asia. Plants have leaf tip tendrils.

== Description ==
Gloriosa are herbaceous perennials that climb or scramble over other plants with the aid of tendrils at the ends of their leaves and can reach 3 meters in height. They have showy flowers, many with distinctive and pronouncedly reflexed petals, like a Turk's cap lily, ranging in colour from a greenish-yellow through yellow, orange, red and sometimes even a deep pinkish-red.

"Scandent herbs, the rootstock a horizontal rhizome, the stem leafy, the leaves spirally arranged or subopposite, the upper ones with cirrhose tips; flowers solitary, large, borne on long, spreading pedicels, actinomorphic, hermaphrodite; perianth segments 6, free, lanceolate, keeled within at base, long-persistent; stamens 6, hypogynous, the anthers extrorse, medifixed and versatile, opening by longitudinal slits; ovary superior, 3-celled, the carpels cohering only by their inner margins, the ovules numerous, the style deflected at base and projecting from the flower more or less horizontally; fruit a loculicidal capsule with many seeds"

== Taxonomy ==
It was described by Carl Linnaeus in 1753 with Gloriosa superba L. as the type species.

=== Species ===
As of June 2024, the World Checklist of Selected Plant Families accepted 11 species of Gloriosa, ignoring hybrids, varieties and cultivars. Many other names are currently rejected as synonyms or unresolved for lack of sufficient data.

| Image | Scientific name | Distribution |
|---|---|---|
| | Gloriosa baudii (A.Terracc.) Chiov. | Ethiopia, Somalia, Kenya |
| | Gloriosa carsonii Baker | C + E + S Africa |
| | Gloriosa flavovirens (Dammer) J.C.Manning & Vinn. | Angola |
| | Gloriosa lindenii (Baker) J.C.Manning & Vinn. | C + SE Africa |
| | Gloriosa littonioides (Welw. ex Baker) J.C.Manning & Vinn. | C + SC Africa |
| | Gloriosa modesta (Hook.) J.C.Manning & Vinn. | southern Africa |
| | Gloriosa revoilii (Franch.) J.C.Manning & Vinn. | NE Africa, Yemen |
| | Gloriosa rigidifolia (Bredell) J.C.Manning & Vinn. | Limpopo |
| | Gloriosa sessiliflora Nordal & Bingham | Angola, Zambia, Caprivi |
| | Gloriosa simplex L. | sub-Saharan Africa, Madagascar |
| | Gloriosa superba L. | sub-Saharan Africa, Madagascar, Seychelles, Indian Subcontinent, SE Asia |

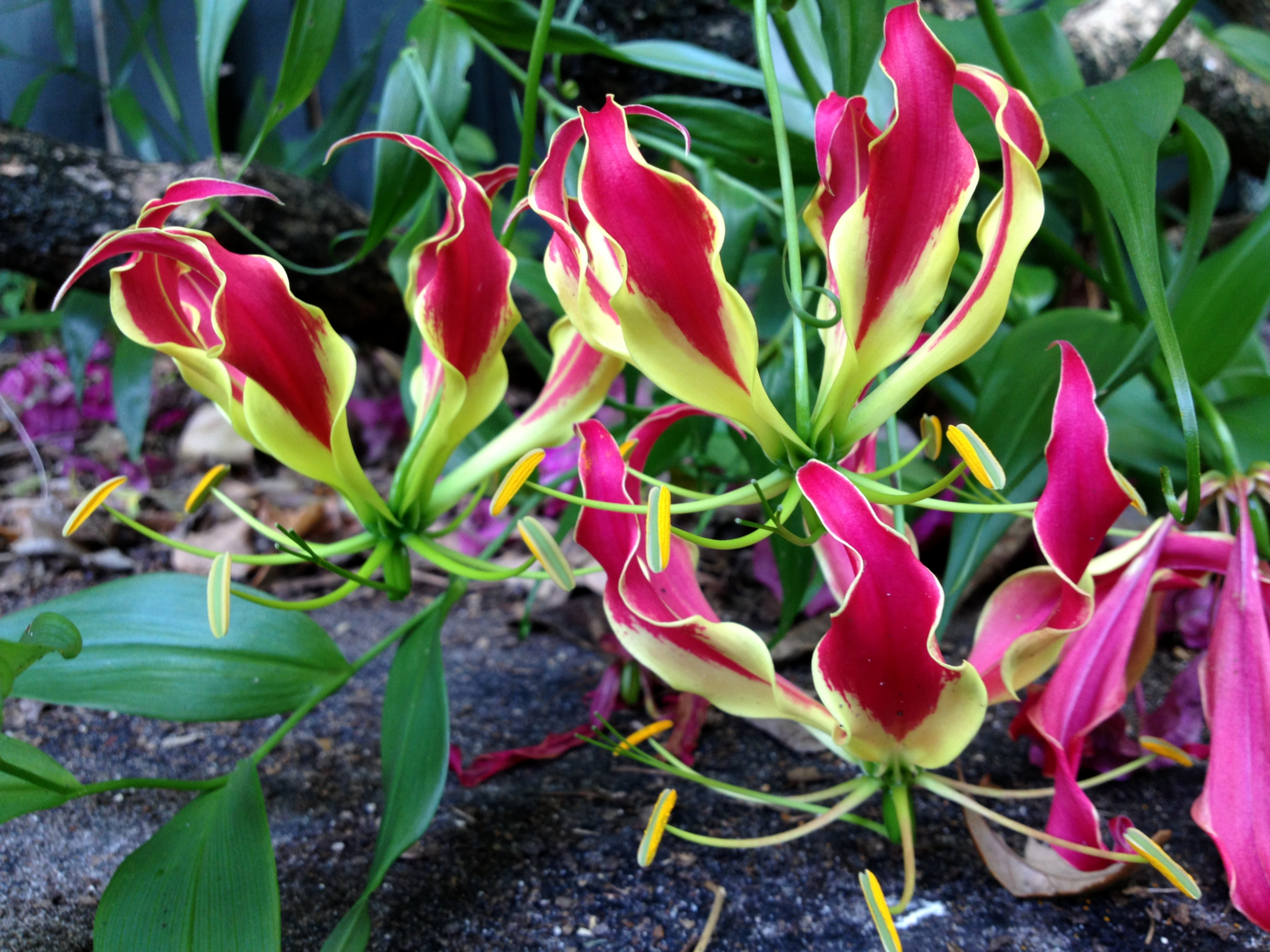
G. superba

== Distribution ==
The genus is widely distributed in Africa, the Arabian Peninsula, and from the Indian subcontinent to Malesia. Gloriosa superba in particular is widely naturalized. In Australia, "scattered naturalized populations exist in the understorey of coastal dry sclerophyll forest and sand dune vegetation throughout south-east Queensland and New South Wales". It is considered a rampant and dangerous invasive weed in Australia, dominating the coastal dunes at the expense of native species and leading to deaths of native animals and birds when ingested.

In India, Gloriosa is distributed in the Western Ghats but their occurrence is locally rare due to degrading habitats and rural populations consuming the tubers for food and medicine.

== Propagation ==
"Propagation generally occurs from seeds, although mature plants can be divided and grown from tubers. The hard seeds can remain dormant for 6-9 months." Growth stops if temperatures are of the order of 15 °C (59 °F) and the plant dies when subjected to 12 °C (54 °F) during this time. La Gloriosa is an extremely fragile and delicate flower, tough to cultivate.

== Toxicology ==
All parts of Gloriosa contain colchicine, the roots and seeds are especially rich. The lethal dose of colchicine is about 6 mg/kg, and Gloriosa superba has been used as a means of committing suicide.

== Symbolism ==
The Rhodesian Light Infantry's Regimental Colours

Gloriosa superba is the national flower of Zimbabwe (where it is a protected plant). A diamond brooch in the shape of the flame lily was a gift from Southern Rhodesia (modern day Zimbabwe) to Queen Elizabeth II on a visit in 1947 while she was still the crown princess. The flame lily was used on the regimental colours of the Rhodesian Light Infantry, this was unique to the Rhodesian Light Infantry as it was the only regiment in the British Empire to not have a wreath of thistles or roses.

Gloriosa superba is also the state flower of Tamil Nadu state in India. It is also considered the national flower of Tamil Eelam, a former de facto inside Republic of Sri Lanka.
