= Mountain willow =

Mountain willow is a common name for several plants and may refer to:

- Salix arbuscula, native to Europe
- Salix eastwoodiae, native to western North America
