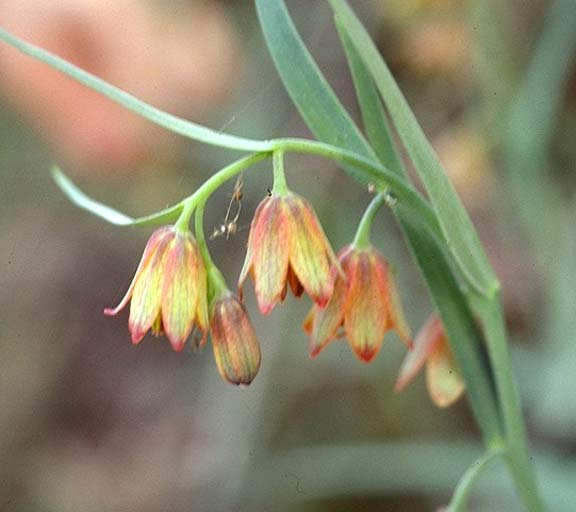

Scientific classification
- Kingdom: Plantae
- Clade: Embryophytes
- Clade: Tracheophytes
- Clade: Angiosperms
- Clade: Monocots
- Order: Liliales
- Family: Liliaceae
- Subfamily: Lilioideae
- Genus: Fritillaria
- Species: F. eastwoodiae

Binomial name
- Fritillaria eastwoodiae R.M. Macfarlane.

Synonyms
- Fritillaria phaeanthera Eastw. 1933, illegitimate homonym, not Purdy 1932

= Fritillaria eastwoodiae =

Butte County fritillary

Species of flowering plant

Fritillaria eastwoodiae, also known as Butte County fritillary or Eastwood's fritillary, is a rare member of the Lily family (Liliaceae), native to the foothills of the northern Sierra Nevada, and Cascade Mountains in California and southern Oregon (Jackson County), USA.

== Description ==
Fritillaria eastwoodiae grows to heights from 20 to 80 centimeters, and has linear to narrowly lanceolate leaves arranged on its glaucous stem. Its flowers are nodding with slightly flared and slightly recurved (curving backwards) tepals. Its color varies from greenish-yellow mottled to a mixture of red, orange, green and yellow mottling.

== Distribution and habitat ==
Fritillaria eastwoodiae grows in dry open woodlands and chaparral from 500 to 1500 meters, in Shasta, Yuba, Tehama, Butte and El Dorado Counties. It has also been reported from Jackson County in Oregon. It occurs in similar habitat with F. affinis, F. micrantha, and F. recurva, and blooms from March through May. It can sometimes be found on serpentine soils.
