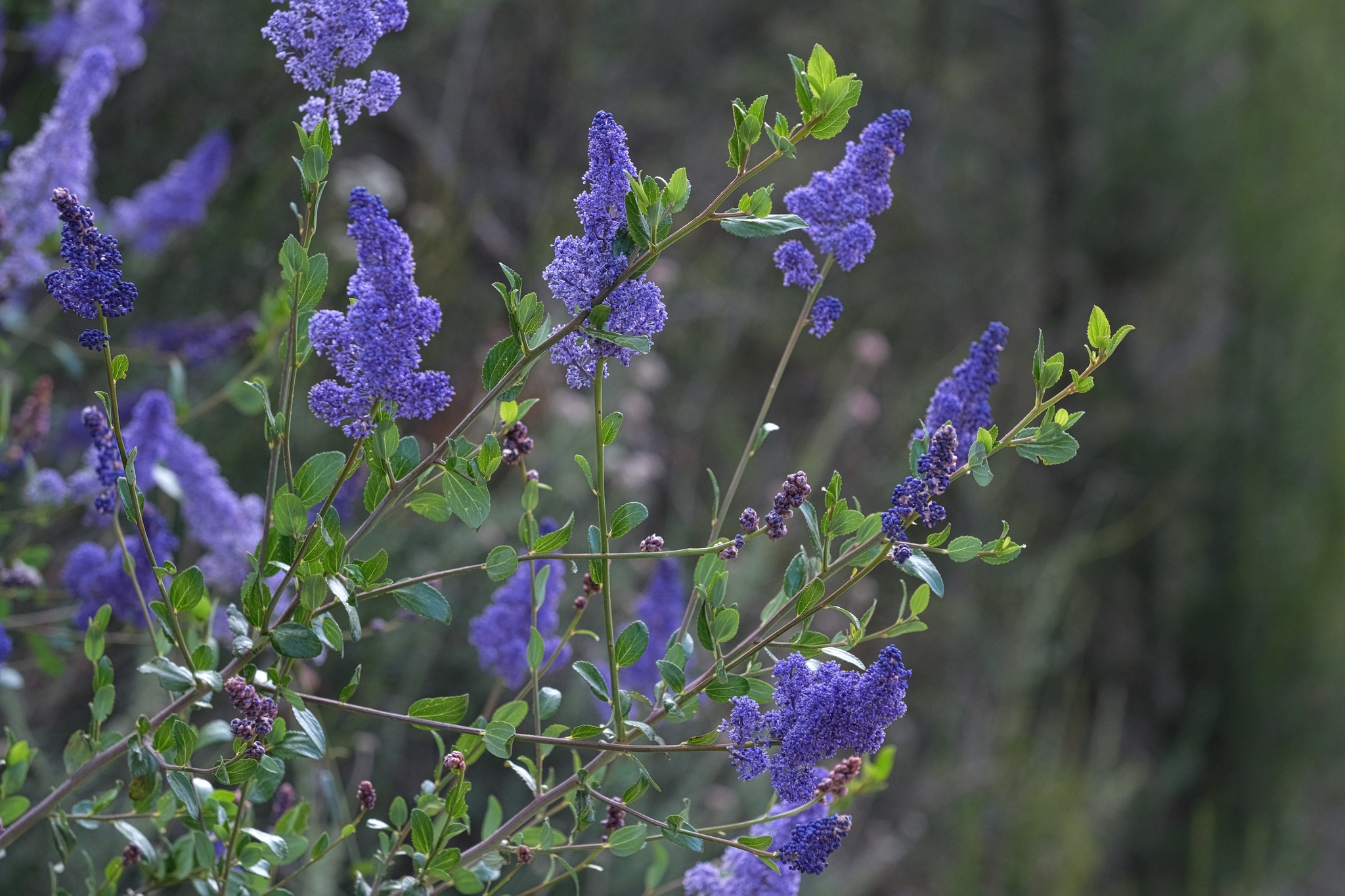

Conservation status
- Imperiled (NatureServe)

Scientific classification
- Kingdom: Plantae
- Clade: Tracheophytes
- Clade: Angiosperms
- Clade: Eudicots
- Clade: Rosids
- Order: Rosales
- Family: Rhamnaceae
- Genus: Ceanothus
- Species: C. cyaneus

Binomial name
- Ceanothus cyaneus Eastw.

= Ceanothus cyaneus =

Species of flowering plant

Ceanothus cyaneus is a species of flowering shrub in the genus Ceanothus known commonly as the San Diego buckbrush and Lakeside ceanothus. This species is found in the Peninsular Ranges of San Diego County, California, and known from one occurrence in Baja California. It is characterized by brilliant blue flowers, glossy green foliage, and is regarded as one of the most beautiful members of the genus.

== Description ==
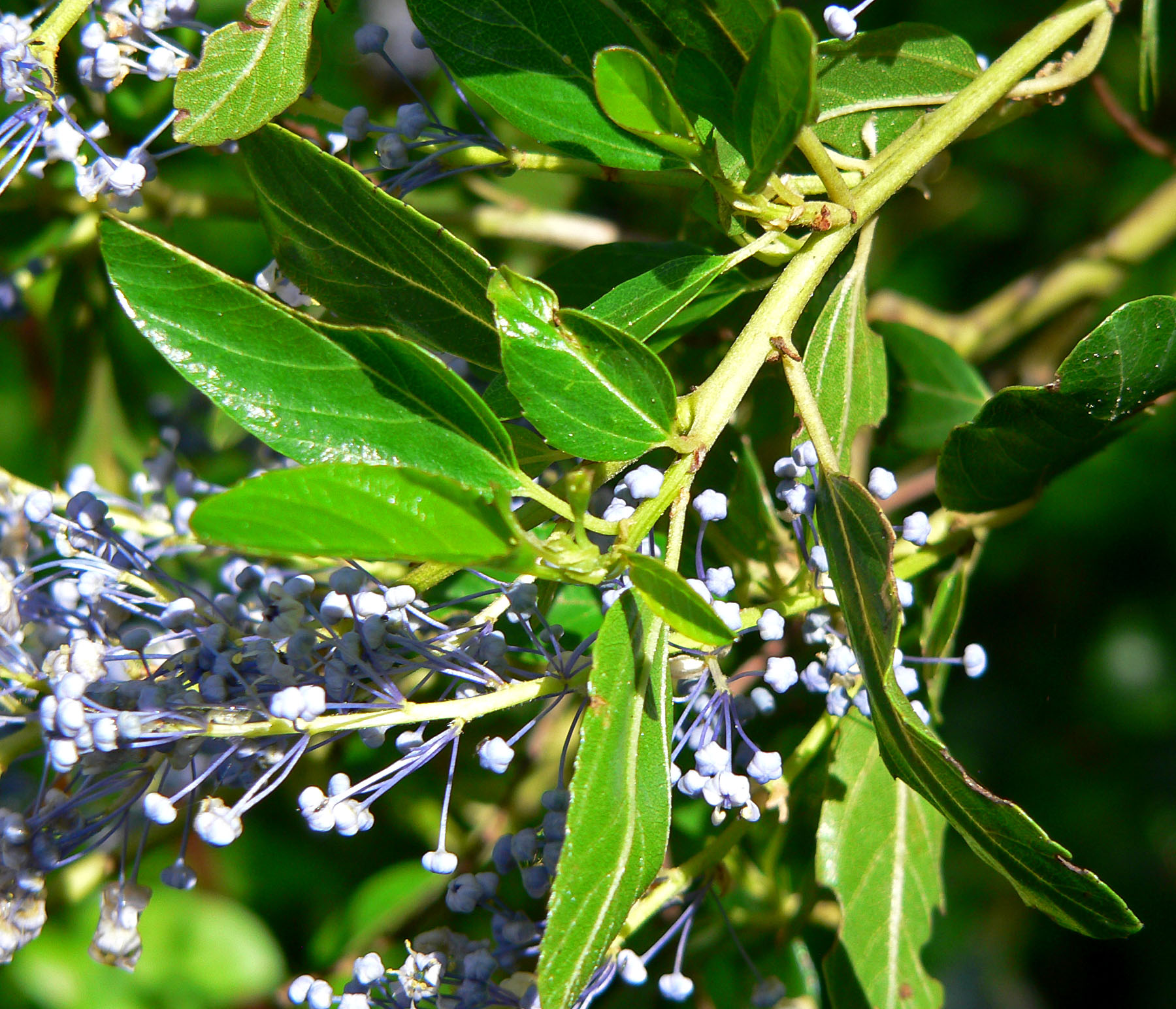
Ceanothus cyaneus

This plant is an open, evergreen shrub reaching less than 3 m in height. The stems are ascending to erect, with flexible, light-green twigs. The leaves are arranged alternately, with scale-like stipules. The leaf petiole is 2 to 6 mm long, while the leaf blade is 14 to 45 mm long and 15 to 20 mm wide. The leaves are shaped ovate to elliptic, colored dark green and smooth (lacking hair) on the upper surface of the leaf, while the bottom side of the leaf is colored pale green with hairy veins. The margin of the leaves may be more or less serrate, with 23 to 58 teeth. The inflorescence is 5 to 30 cm long, with deep or bright blue flowers. The fruit is 3 to 5 mm wide. The plants flower from April to June.

=== Characteristics ===
The twigs of this species are papillate (bearing small protuberances, papillae) not thornlike, and the leaf blade has a length that is less than twice the width. The flowers are a very distinctive brilliant blue. Compared to other local species like Ceanothus tomentosus, this species has larger leaves and does not have the conspicuous black glands on the teethed edges of the leaf margin. The leaves are also almost glabrous, unlike both Ceanothus tomentosus and Ceanothus oliganthus. The twigs are flexible, and not rigid like on Ceanothus leucodermis.

== Distribution and habitat ==
This species is distributed throughout part of San Diego County, California in the United States and has one historical occurrence in Baja California, Mexico. In San Diego County, it is found in the inland chaparral on the Peninsular Range foothills near the communities of Lakeside and Crest. This plant occurs in dense, almost impenetrable chaparral on igneous rock and rocky, coarse sandy loams. In Baja California, a single historical collection is known from near the Cerro Coronel, in between Tijuana and La Mision.

== Uses ==
This species was introduced into cultivation in California by Theodore Payne. It requires good drainage, must be kept dry during summer, and is not tolerant of frost.
