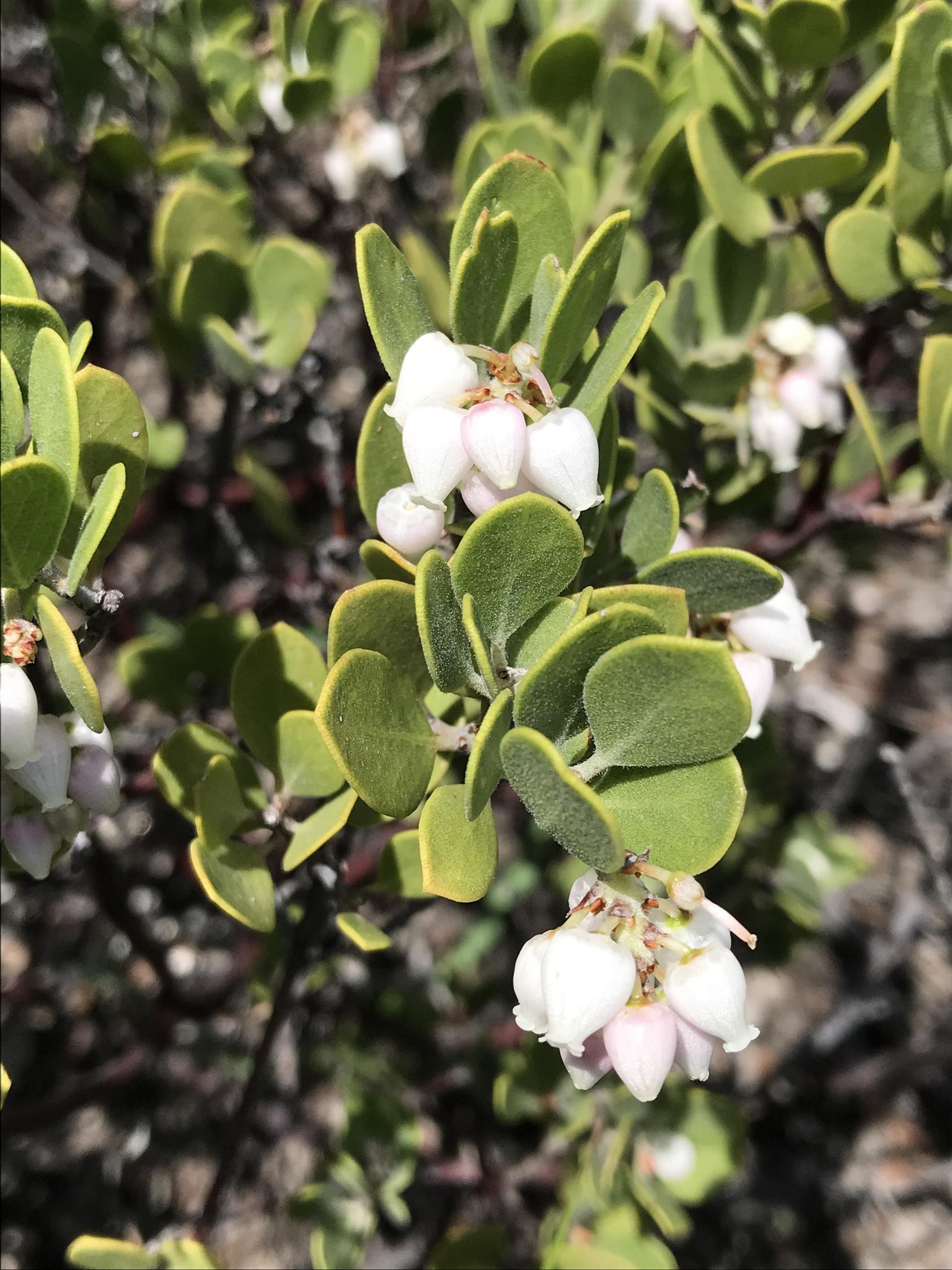

Conservation status
- Endangered (ESA)

Scientific classification
- Kingdom: Plantae
- Clade: Tracheophytes
- Clade: Angiosperms
- Clade: Eudicots
- Clade: Asterids
- Order: Ericales
- Family: Ericaceae
- Genus: Arctostaphylos
- Species: A. montana

Binomial name
- Arctostaphylos montana Eastw.

Synonyms
- Arctostaphylos hookeri subsp. montana Eastw.; Arctostaphylos pungens subsp. montana (Eastw.) Roof; Arctostaphylos pungens var. montana (Eastw.) Munz; Uva-ursi montana (Eastw.) A.Heller

= Arctostaphylos montana =

Species of plant

Arctostaphylos montana is a species of manzanita. It is endemic to the San Francisco Bay area where it has been found on Mount Tamalpais and at the Presidio of San Francisco.

== Taxonomy ==
Arctostaphylos montana has two subspecies, both of which were formerly considered as a subspecies of Hooker's manzanita until reclassified following modern genetic analysis and comparisons.

- Arctostaphylos montana subsp. montana Eastw. - Mt. Tamalpais manzanita - native to Mount Tamalpais
- Arctostaphylos montana subsp. ravenii (P.V.Wells) V.T.Parker, M.C.Vasey & J.E.Keeley - Presidio manzanita - one single plant and a few clones exist at the Presidio of San Francisco. Federally listed as an endangered subspecies of the United States.
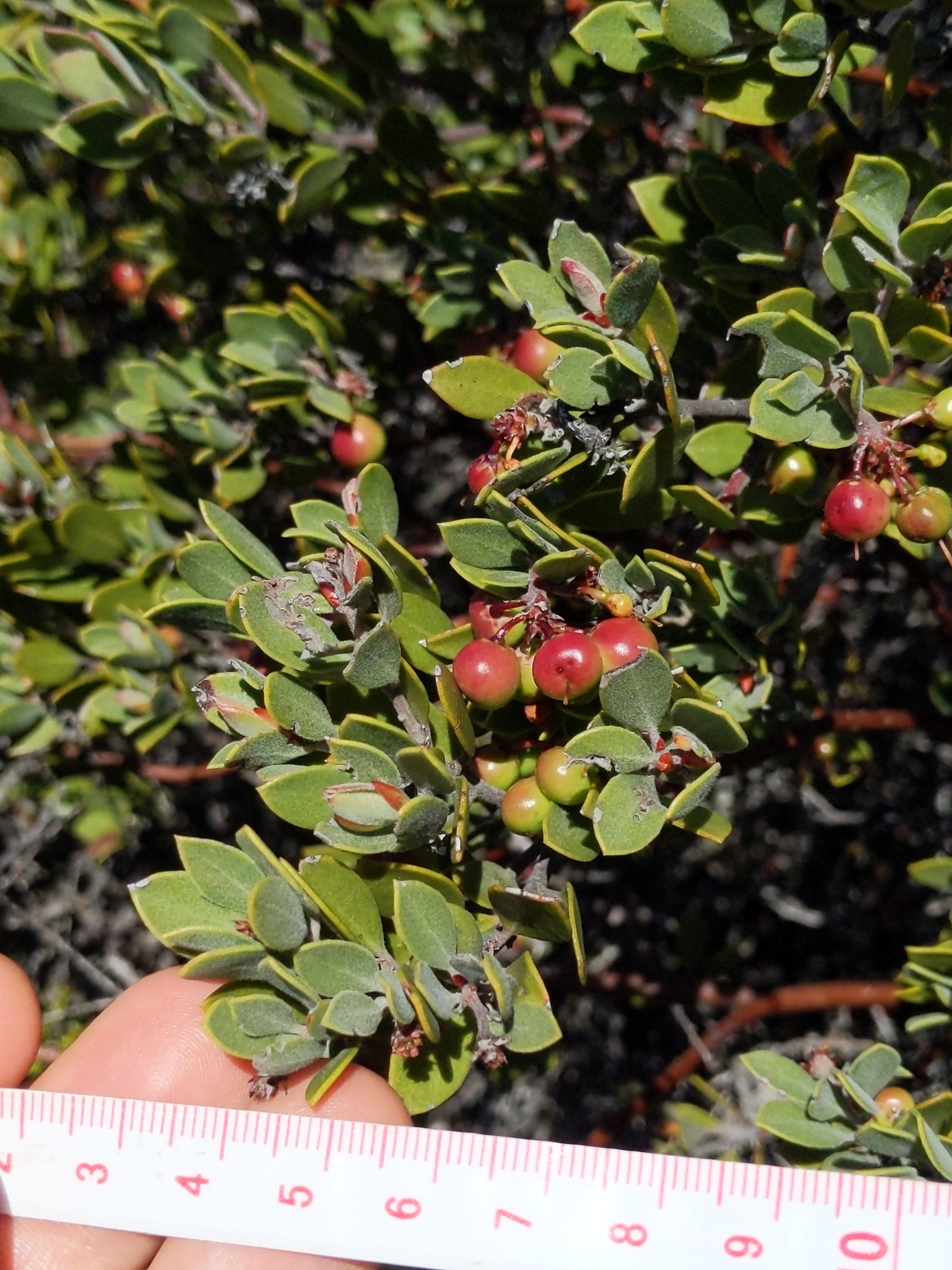
Fruit

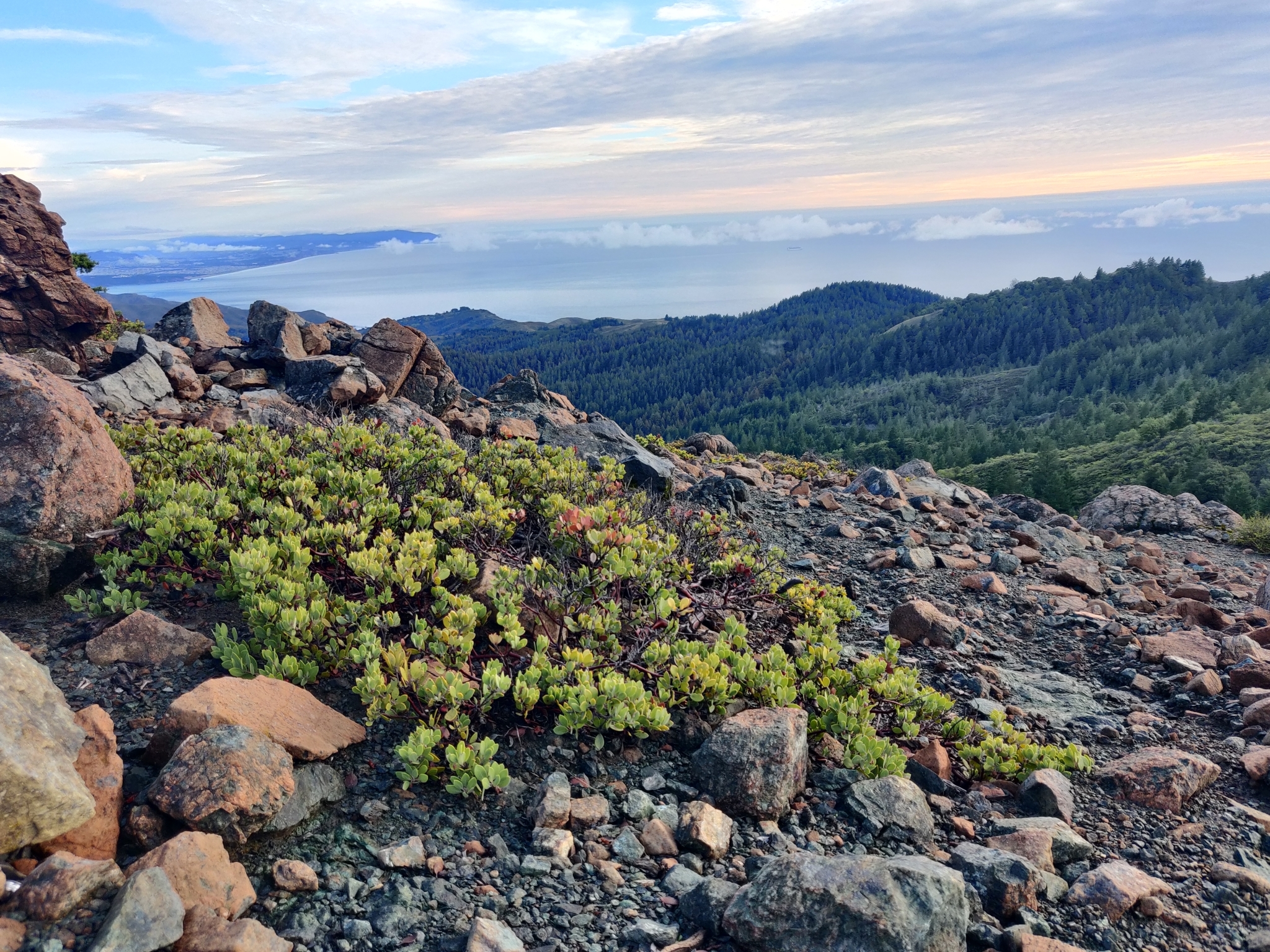
Arctostaphylos montana
