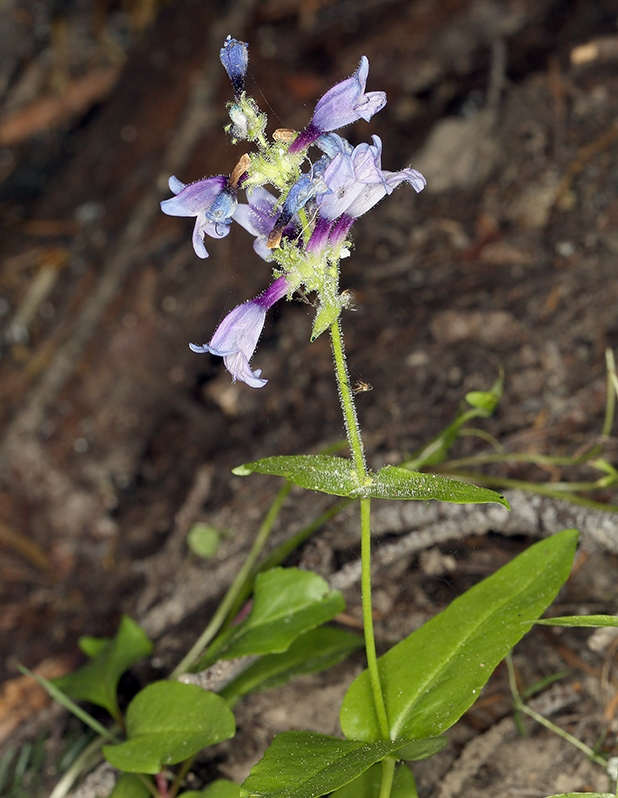

Conservation status
- Apparently Secure (NatureServe)

Scientific classification
- Kingdom: Plantae
- Clade: Tracheophytes
- Clade: Angiosperms
- Clade: Eudicots
- Clade: Asterids
- Order: Lamiales
- Family: Plantaginaceae
- Genus: Penstemon
- Species: P. anguineus

Binomial name
- Penstemon anguineus Eastw.

Synonyms
- Penstemon minor (A.Gray) D.D.Keck; Penstemon rattanii var. minor A.Gray

= Penstemon anguineus =

Plant species in the plantain family

Penstemon anguineus is a species of penstemon known by the common name Siskiyou penstemon. It is native to the mountains of southern Oregon and northern California, where it grows in coniferous forests, often in open areas left by logging operations. It is a herbaceous plant that may reach as much as 90 centimeters in height, with light blue or purple flowers.

== Description ==
Penstemon anguineus is a herbaceous plant, one without woody stems, that may reach as much as 90 centimeters in height. Though it may be occasionally as short as 10 cm at maturity it is more often taller than 30 cm.

Both basal leaves, ones attached directly to the base of the plant, and the lower cauline leaves, ones attached to the stems are 30 to 150 millimeters long and 6 to 40 mm wide. Basal leaves are lanceolate, shaped like a spear head, to narrowly ovate, egg shaped but thinner. Leaf edges are dentate, having symmetrical teeth, to serrate, with distinct forward pointing saw teeth along the edge. Some plants may have smooth edged leaves or only have very fine ones. There are two to four pairs of leaves attached to the stems. They are arranged oppositely with ones higher on the stem clasping it, with the base of the leaf partly wrapped around it. They may be 11 to 90 millimeters long and 5–50 mm in width.

The inflorescence produces several light blue or purple flowers. The flowers have violet nectar guides and 13–18 millimeters long. The sepals and flowers are covered in glandular hairs. The inside of the flower has many white hairs. The smooth to sparely hairy staminode is 10–13 mm long and extends out of the opening of the flower tube. When present the staminode hairs are yellow.

== Taxonomy ==
This species was scientifically described for the first time in 1880 as a variety under the name Penstemon rattanii var. minor by the botanist Asa Gray. Independently, Alice Eastwood described it as a species named Penstemon anguineus in 1905. Because of the differing descriptions the earlier variety and the 1940 description of it by David D. Keck as Penstemon minor are considered heterotypic synonyms. The specimen described as type of the species was collected from Shelley Creek in Del Norte County, California.

=== Names ===
The common names in English for Penstemon anguineus include Siskiyou penstemon and tongue-leaved penstemon.

== Range and habitat ==
The native range for Siskiyou penstemon is in the US states of California and Oregon. In California it grows in the northern part of the state in the higher parts of the North Coast Ranges and Klamath Ranges. The distribution of the species continues northward to the area around Crater Lake in southern Oregon including Douglas County.

In coniferous forests it grows in forest openings including those produced by logging activities. It also grows on mountainsides and ridges and the transition to chaparral habitats.

== See also ==
List of Penstemon species
