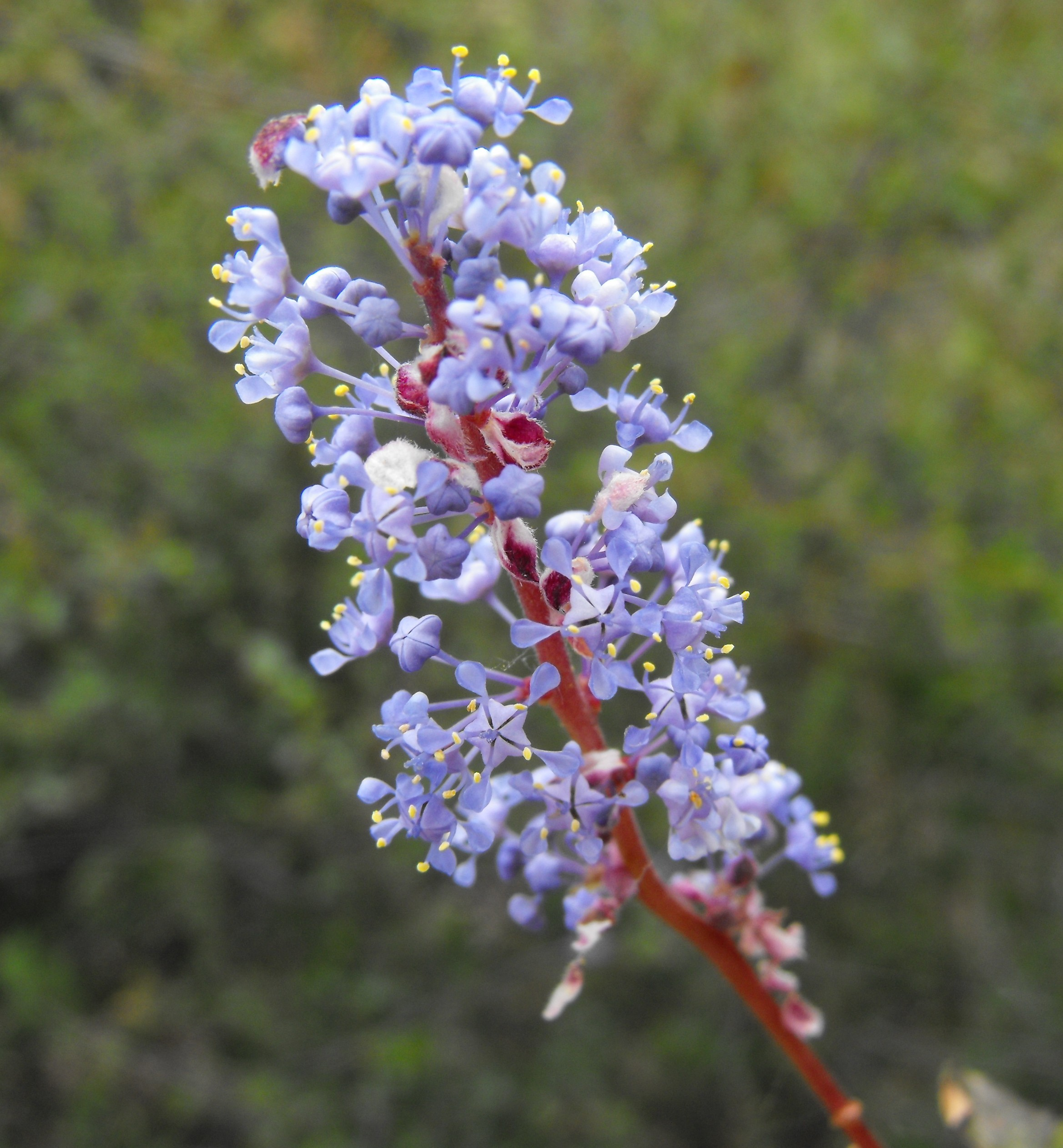

Conservation status
- Vulnerable (NatureServe)

Scientific classification
- Kingdom: Plantae
- Clade: Tracheophytes
- Clade: Angiosperms
- Clade: Eudicots
- Clade: Rosids
- Order: Rosales
- Family: Rhamnaceae
- Genus: Ceanothus
- Species: C. tomentosus

Binomial name
- Ceanothus tomentosus Parry

= Ceanothus tomentosus =

Species of flowering plant

Ceanothus tomentosus, with the common name woollyleaf ceanothus, is a species of shrub in the family Rhamnaceae. It is characterized by pale-blue to deep blue flowers and wooly leaves. It is native to California and Baja California, having an unusual disjunct distribution in the Peninsular Ranges and the north-central Sierra Nevada.

== Description ==
Ceanothus tomentosus is an erect shrub (occasionally tree-like) approaching 3 m in maximum height. The woody parts are reddish or brown, especially when new. The evergreen leaves are alternately arranged, elliptic to oval in shape, dark green and with short hairs on the top and woolly on the undersides. The leaves have a petiole 1 to 3 mm long, with the leaf blade 10 to 25 mm long, 5 to 12 mm wide. The margins of the leaves are serrated with 40 to 60 tiny glandular teeth. The inflorescence is a cluster several centimeters long of pale blue to deep blue flowers. The fruit is a lobed capsule a few millimeters long which is sticky when new.

=== Characteristics ===
Diagnostic features include the leaves being 3-ribbed from the base, the leaf veins being more or less obscured by the hairs, and the teeth on the edge of the leaf being tipped with glands, which sets it apart from plants like Ceanothus cyaneus. The twigs on this species are also flexible and not thornlike, as opposed to species like Ceanothus leucodermis with rigid, thornlike twigs.

Diagnostic features of Ceanothus tomentosus

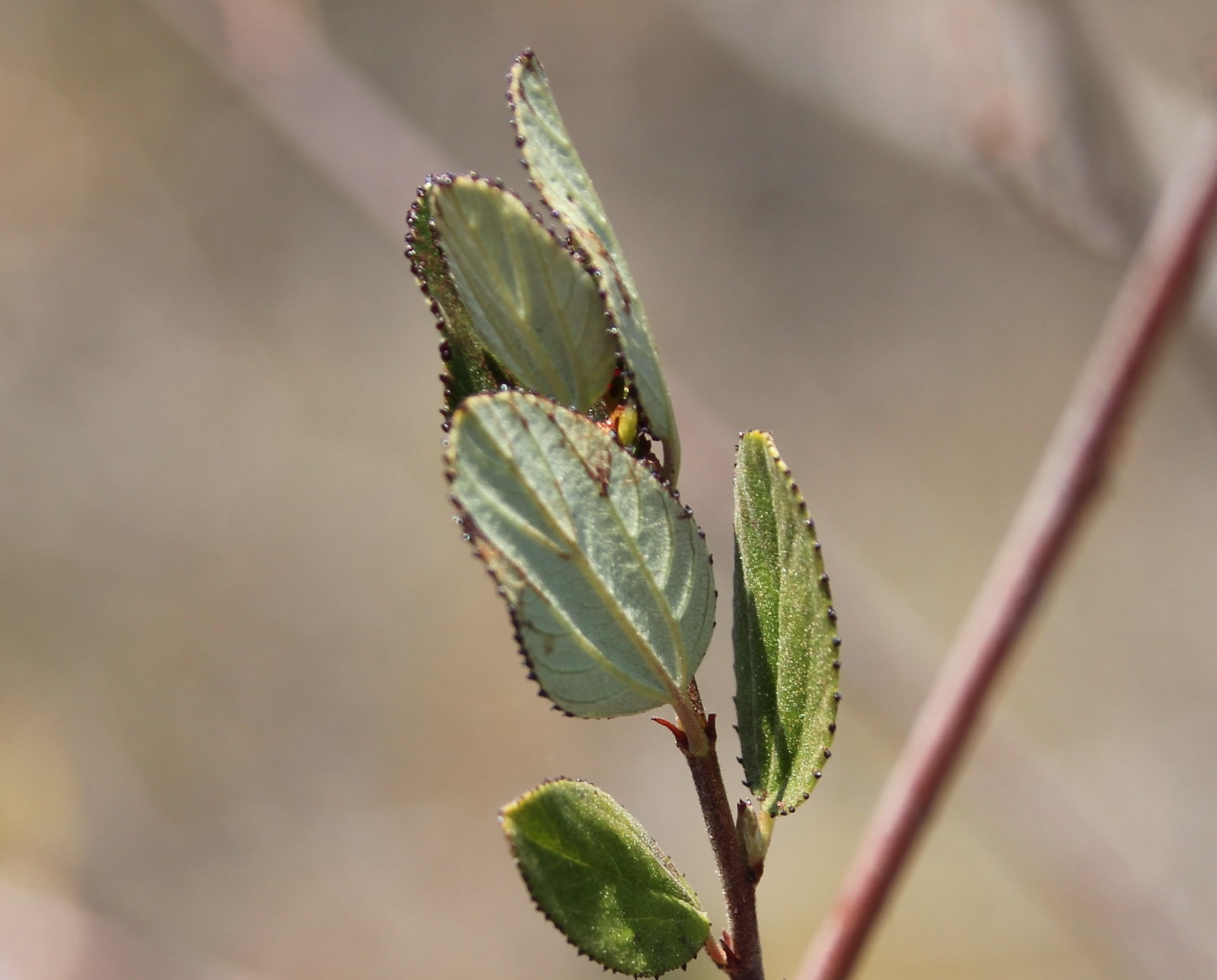
Note the conspicuous black glands on the teeth of the serrated margins

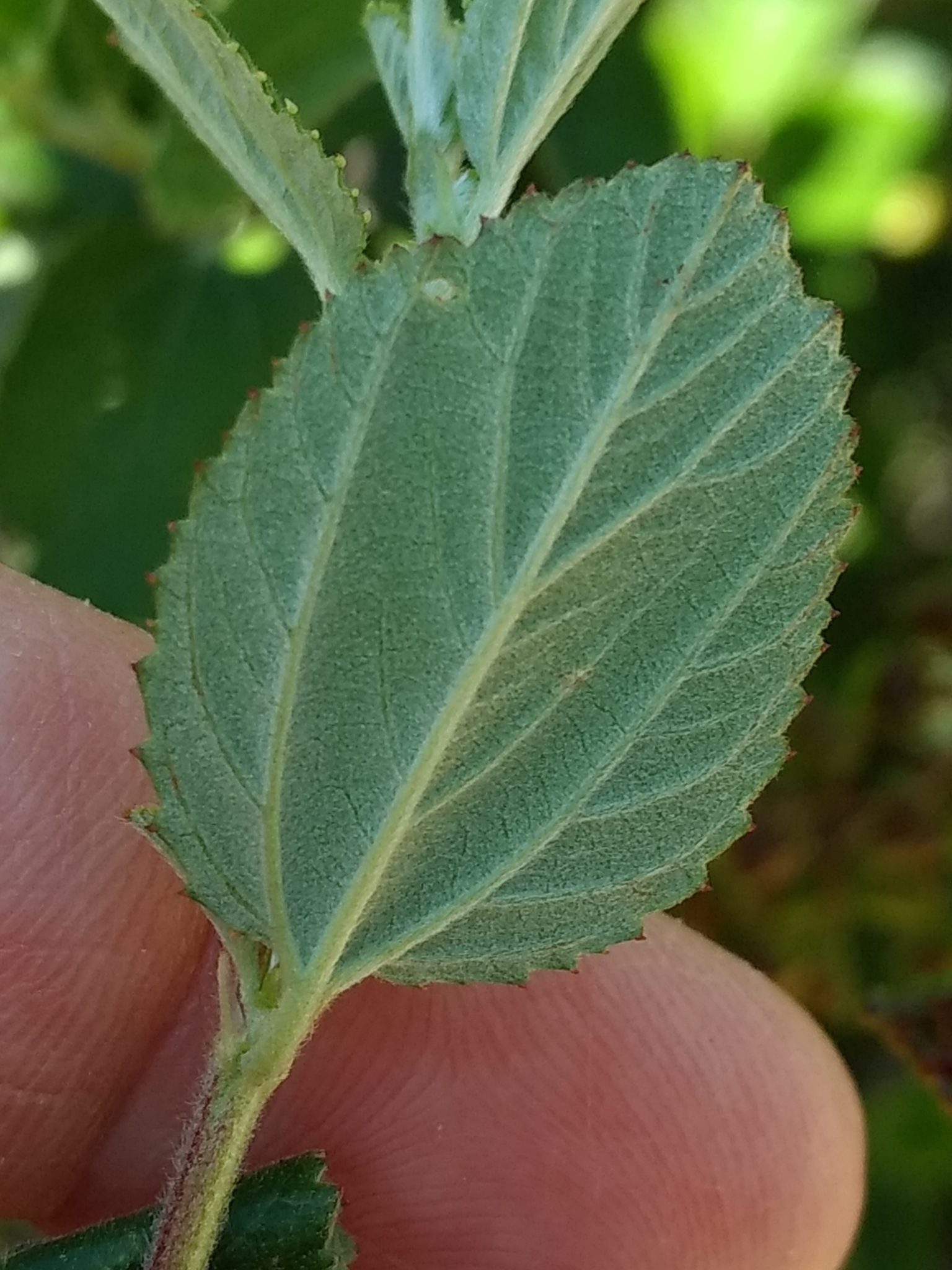
The 3-ribbed base of the underside of the leaf

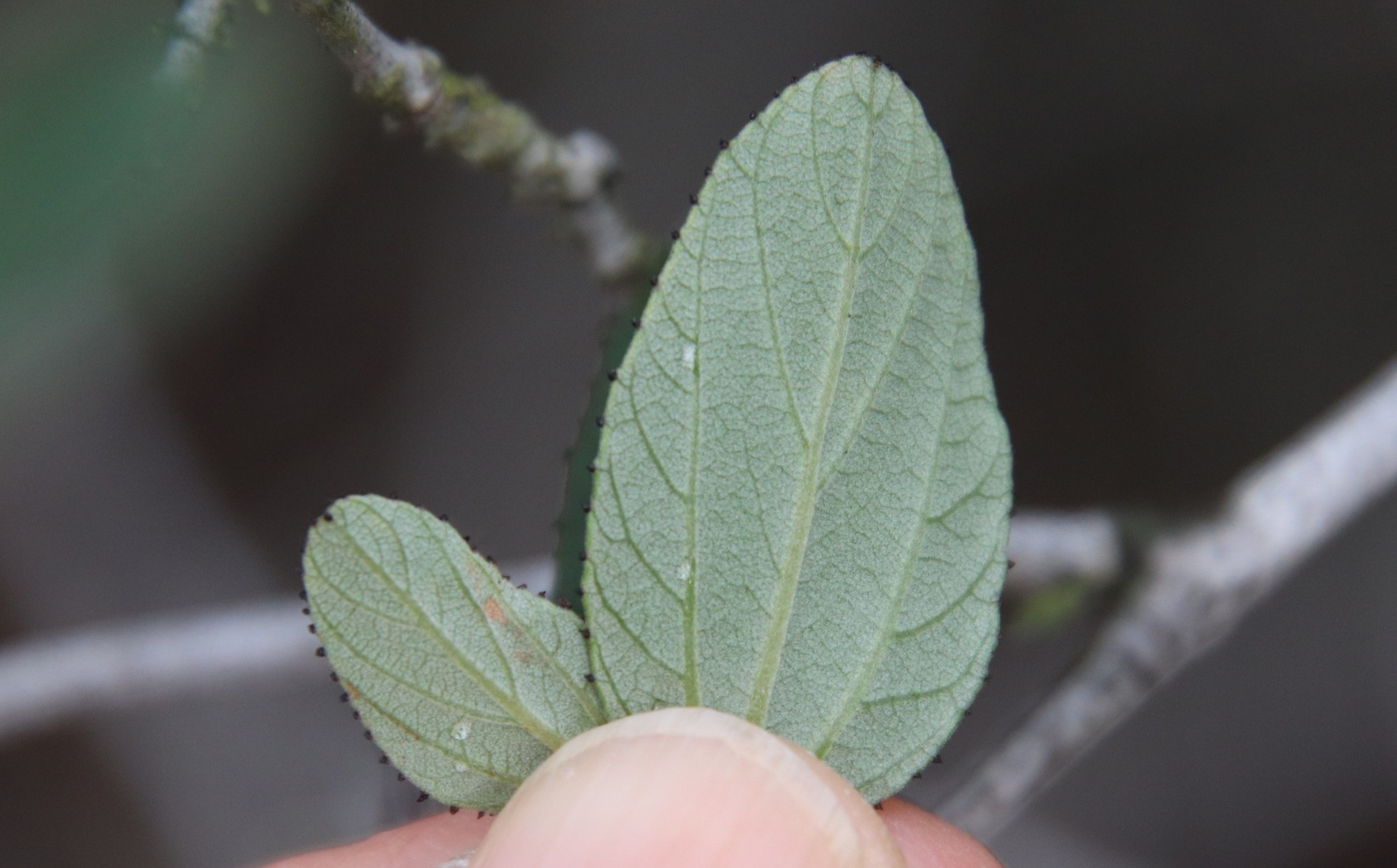
Note the glandular teeth and the venation

== Taxonomy and phenology ==
This species was described by Charles Christopher Parry in 1889. It is within the Ceanothus subgenus Ceanothus. The specific epithet tomentosus refers to the dense, interwoven trichomes on the plant.

Although the Ceanothus subgenera vary in their preference to sprout from lignotubers (resprouting) versus seeds (nonsprouting) after fire, Ceanothus tomentosus exhibits both resprouting and nonsprouting plants across its range. Plants in the Sierra Nevada section of the distribution resprout after fire, while plants in the Southern California area of distribution are non-sprouters. Nonsprouting populations tended to have an earlier onset of flowering as well.

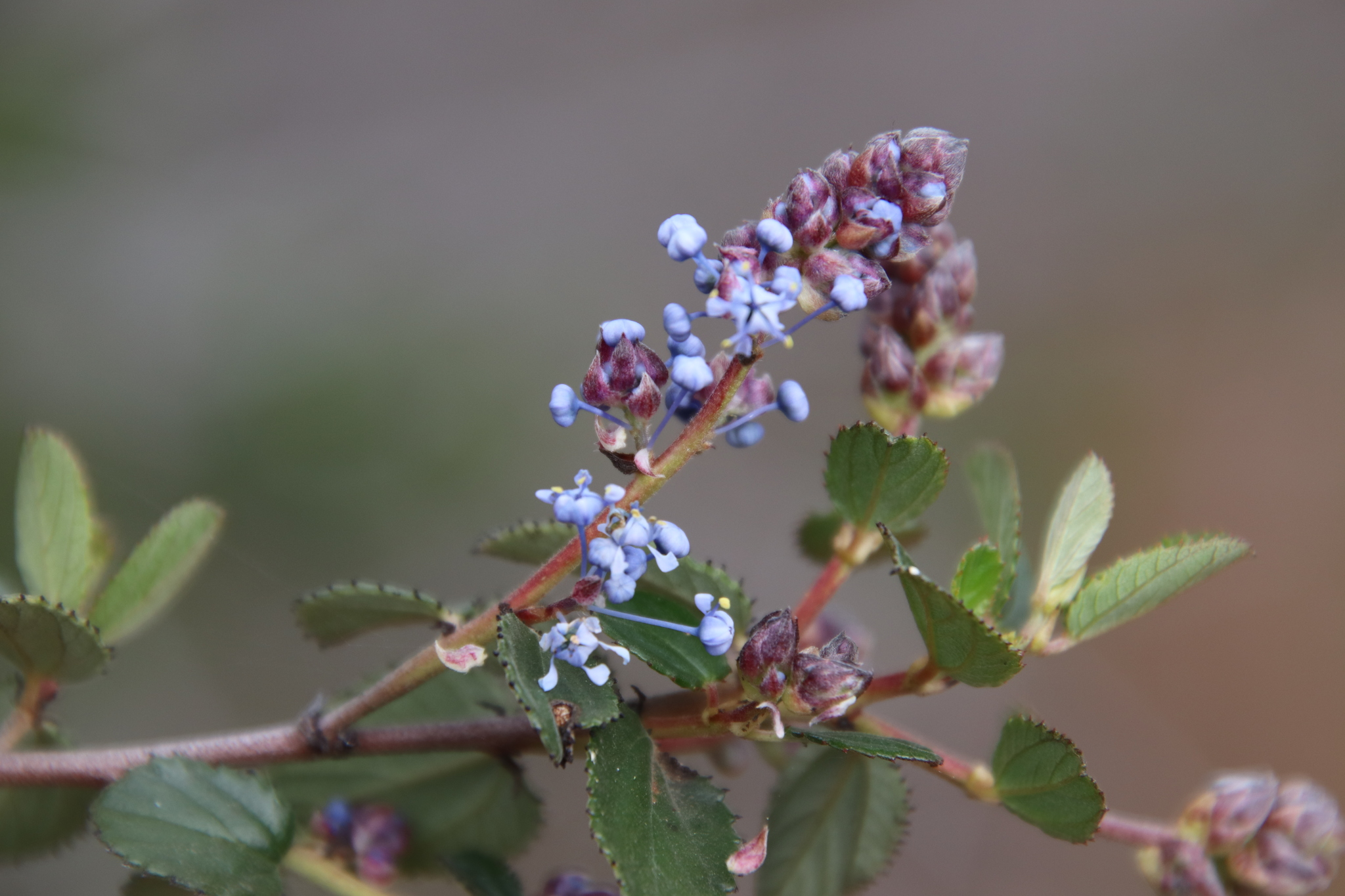
Budding and flowering

== Distribution and habitat ==
This species is distributed in both the United States and Mexico. In the United States, it is found in the state of California, in the Peninsular Ranges of Southern California, but also with a disjunct distribution in a portion of the north and central Sierra Nevada and its foothills. In Mexico, this species is found in the northwestern part of Baja California, from Tijuana to the southern end of the Sierra de San Pedro Martir.

This plant primarily occurs on open sites on slopes, ridges, chaparral, and coniferous forest.
