= Eastwoodiella =

Conservation status
- Vulnerable (NatureServe)

Scientific classification
- Kingdom: Plantae
- Clade: Tracheophytes
- Clade: Angiosperms
- Clade: Eudicots
- Clade: Asterids
- Order: Asterales
- Family: Campanulaceae
- Subfamily: Campanuloideae
- Genus: Eastwoodiella; Morin (2020)
- Species: E. californica

Binomial name
- Eastwoodiella californica (Kellogg) Morin (2020)

Synonyms
- Campanula californica (Kellogg) A.Heller (1902); Campanula linnaeifolia A.Gray (1868); Wahlenbergia californica Kellogg (1863)

Species of flowering plant in the bellflower family

Eastwoodiella californica is a species of flowering plant in the bellflower family Campanulaceae, known by the common names swamp bellflower and swamp harebell. It is the sole species in genus Eastwoodiella.

== Description ==
This is a hairy rhizomatous perennial herb producing a thin, creeping stem 10 to 30 centimeters (4 to 12 in) long. The thin, rippled leaves are oval in shape and between 1 and 2 centimeters (0.4 and 0.8 in) long. The bell-shaped flower is pale blue with curving petals up to 1.5 centimeters (0.6 in) long. The fruit is a ribbed, spherical capsule.

== Distribution and habitat ==
It is endemic to California, where it grows along the coastline between Marin and Mendocino Counties. It is found mainly in wet areas such as bogs, marshes, and wet forest floors.

Albert Kellogg first described the species in 1863 as Wahlenbergia californica. It was later reclassified into genus Campanula. Phylogenetic molecular studies revealed that Campanula was paraphyletic, and the species was placed in the new genus Eastwoodiella, named for botanist Alice Eastwood (1859–1953).
