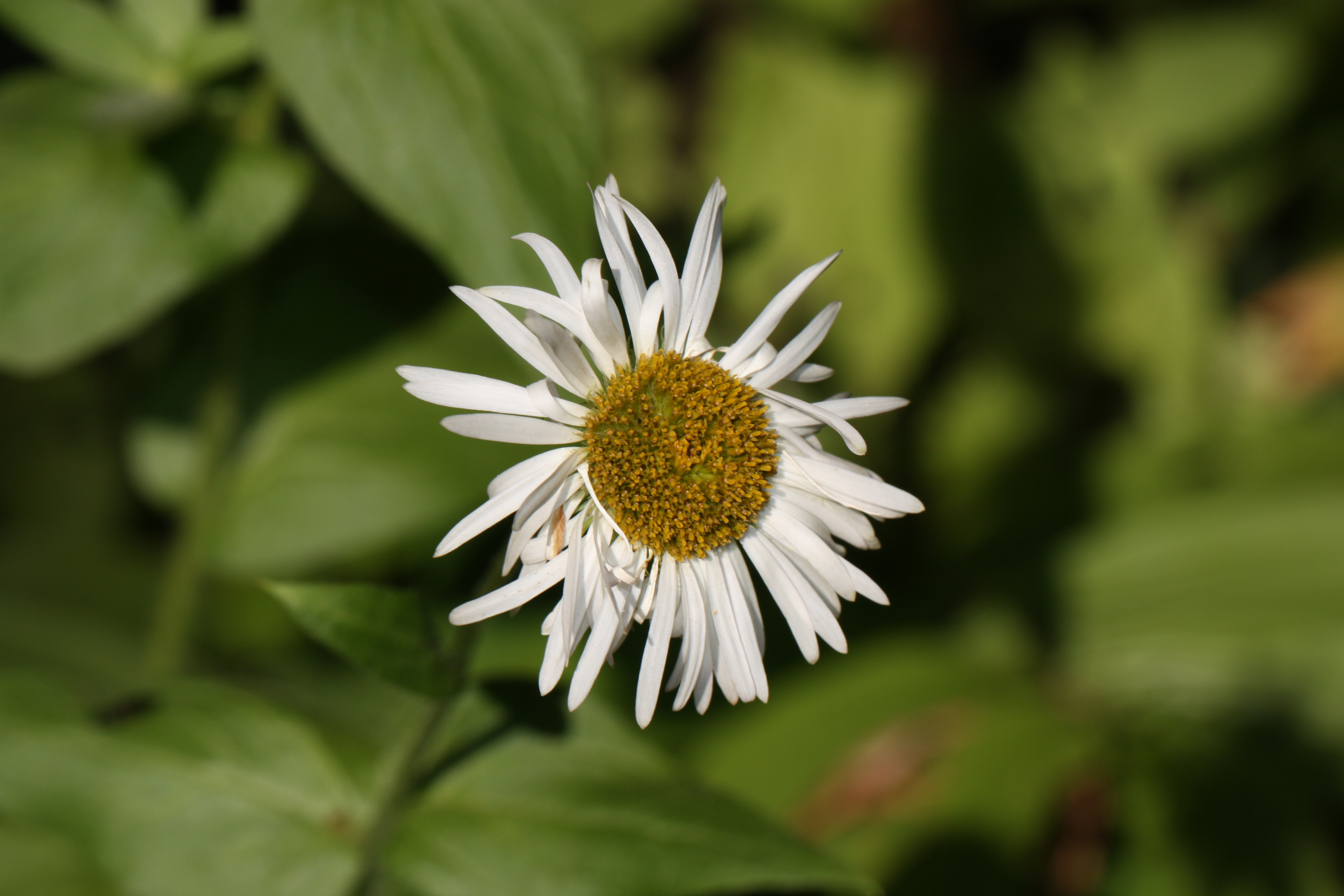

Scientific classification
- Kingdom: Plantae
- Clade: Tracheophytes
- Clade: Angiosperms
- Clade: Eudicots
- Clade: Asterids
- Order: Asterales
- Family: Asteraceae
- Genus: Erigeron
- Species: E. aliceae

Binomial name
- Erigeron aliceae Howell

Synonyms
- Erigeron amplifolius Howell; Erigeron nemophilus Greene

= Erigeron aliceae =

Species of flowering plant

Erigeron aliceae is a species of flowering plant in the family Asteraceae known by the common name Alice Eastwood's fleabane, or simply Alice's fleabane. It was named for American botanist Alice Eastwood, 1859 - 1953.

Erigeron aliceae is a perennial native to the meadows and woodlands of the Pacific Northwest. It is found in western Washington, western Oregon, and the northwestern corner of California (Del Norte, Humboldt, Trinity, and Siskiyou Counties). There is a report of an isolated population in the Sierra Nevada east of Yuba City, but this might be an escape from cultivation.

Erigeron aliceae has branching stems reaching 50–100 cm (20–40 in) in height, with hairy, rounded basal leaves and a few lance-shaped leaves along the narrow, hairy stems. The inflorescence at the top of each erect stem holds 1-7 flower heads, each one to two centimeters (0.4-0.8 inches) wide. The center is made up of many yellow disc florets and surrounded by a ring of up to 80 narrow ray florets in white to shades of light purple and blue.
