= Margaret Warriner Buck =

American botanical and scientific artist

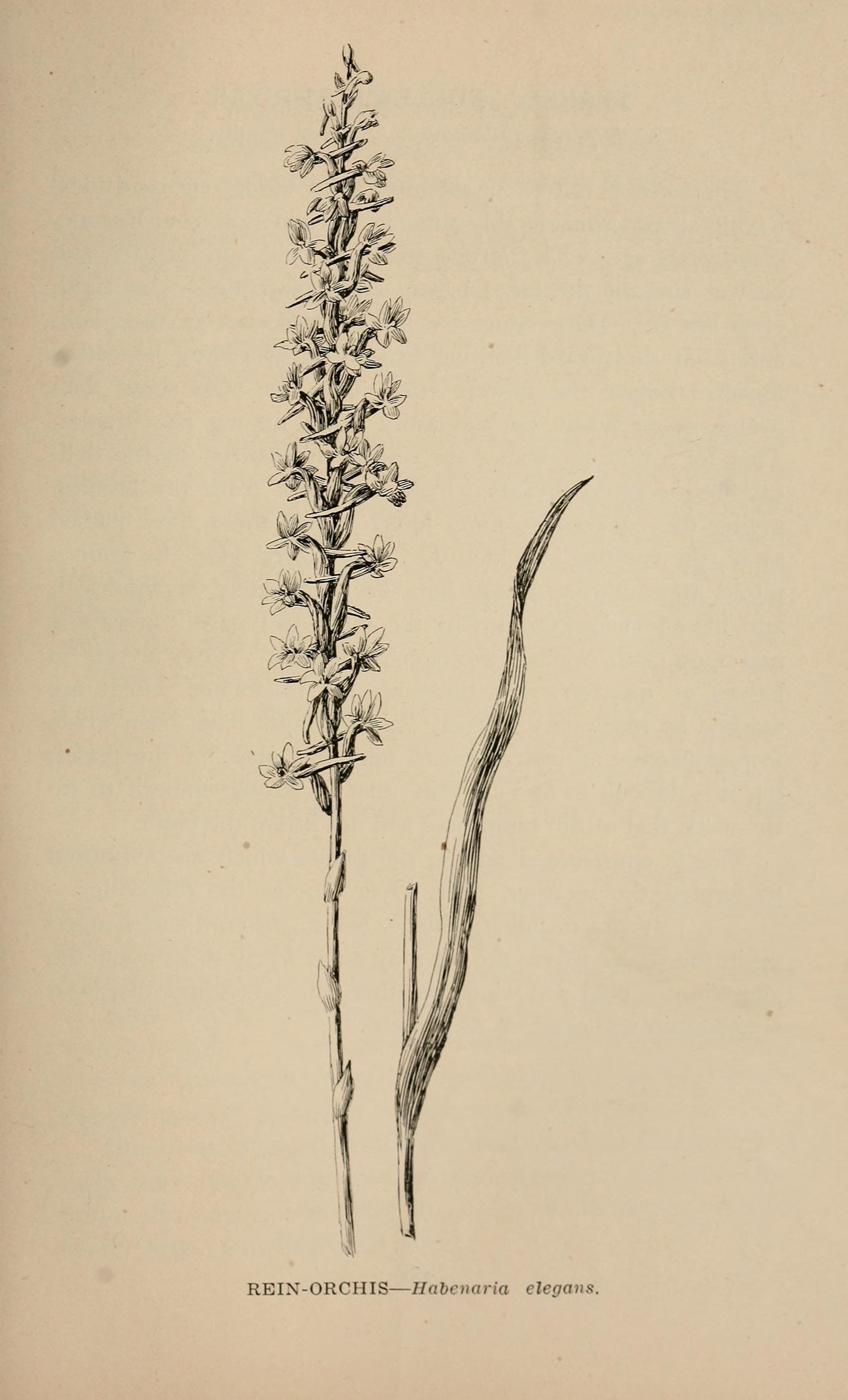
Rein-orchis (Habenaria elegans), from a drawing by Margaret Warriner Buck for The Wild Flowers of California

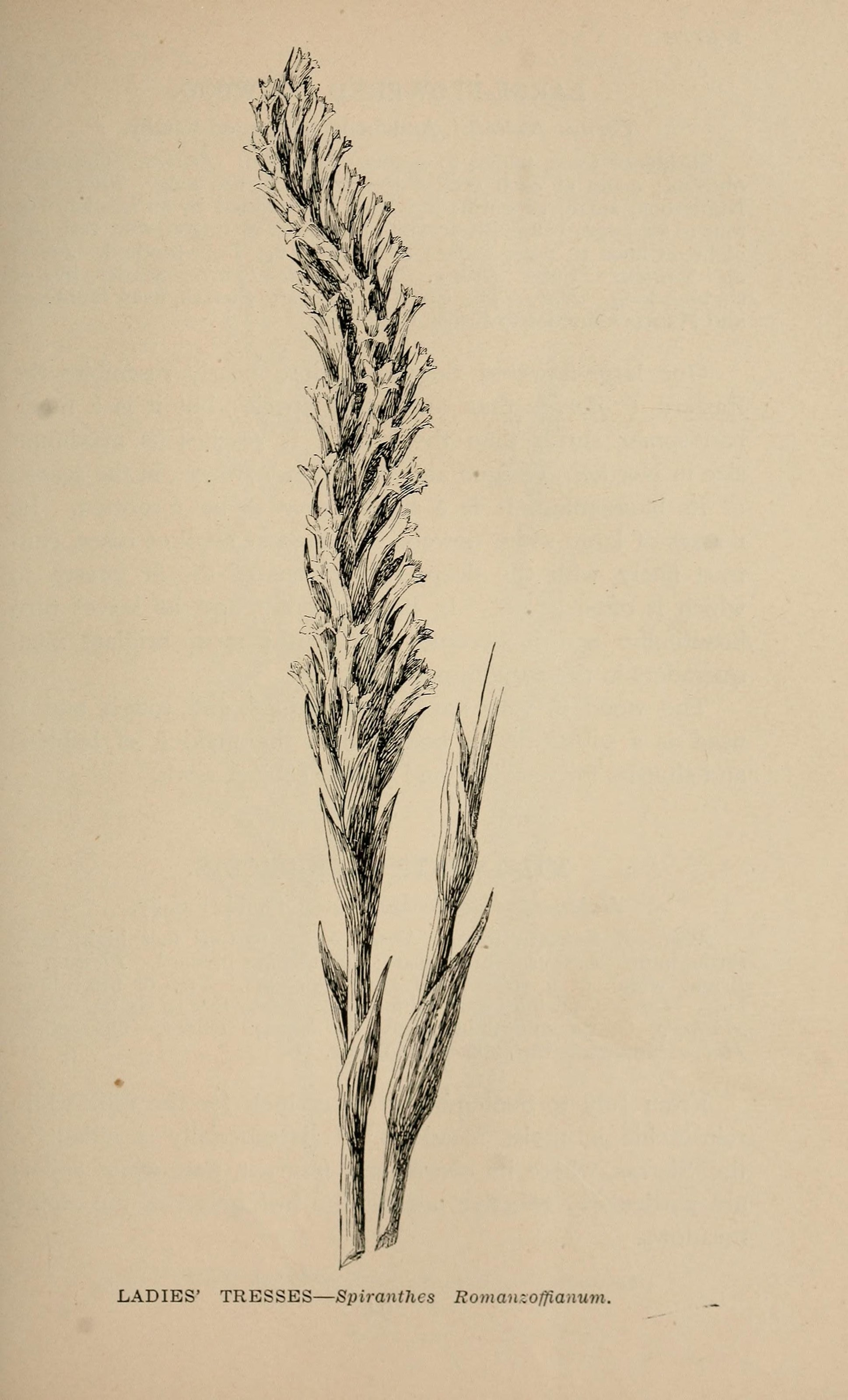
Ladies' Tresses or Spiranthes Romanzoffianum (now Spiranthes romanzoffiana), from a drawing by Margaret Warriner Buck for The Wild Flowers of California

Margaret Warriner Buck (April 29, 1857 - April 5, 1929) was an American botanical artist known as a specialist in depicting California wildflowers.

== Biography ==
Buck was born Margaret Warriner in New York, New York, in 1857. She studied art at Yale Art School before moving to San Francisco in 1891. She gained a reputation as a botanical artist and specialist in depicting California wildflowers. In the 1890s, she and writer Mary Elizabeth Parsons hiked around California with an eye to publishing a book about California flora. The result was the very successful The Wild Flowers of California: Their Names, Haunts, and Habits (1897), written by Parsons with over 100 illustrations engraved from Buck's pen-and-ink drawings. It went through many printings and several editions and was still being reprinted into the 1950s.

After the San Francisco Earthquake of 1906, she worked for Sunset magazine. She died in San Rafael, California, in 1929.
