= Mary Elizabeth Parsons =

American botanist and author (1859-1947)

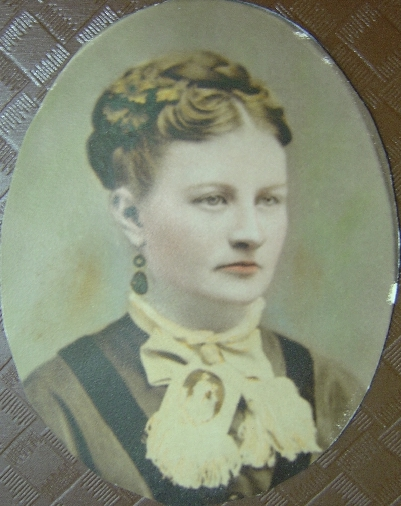
Mary Elizabeth Parsons

Mary Elizabeth Parsons (1859 – December 22, 1947) was the writer of an early comprehensive guide to California wildflowers.

== Biography ==
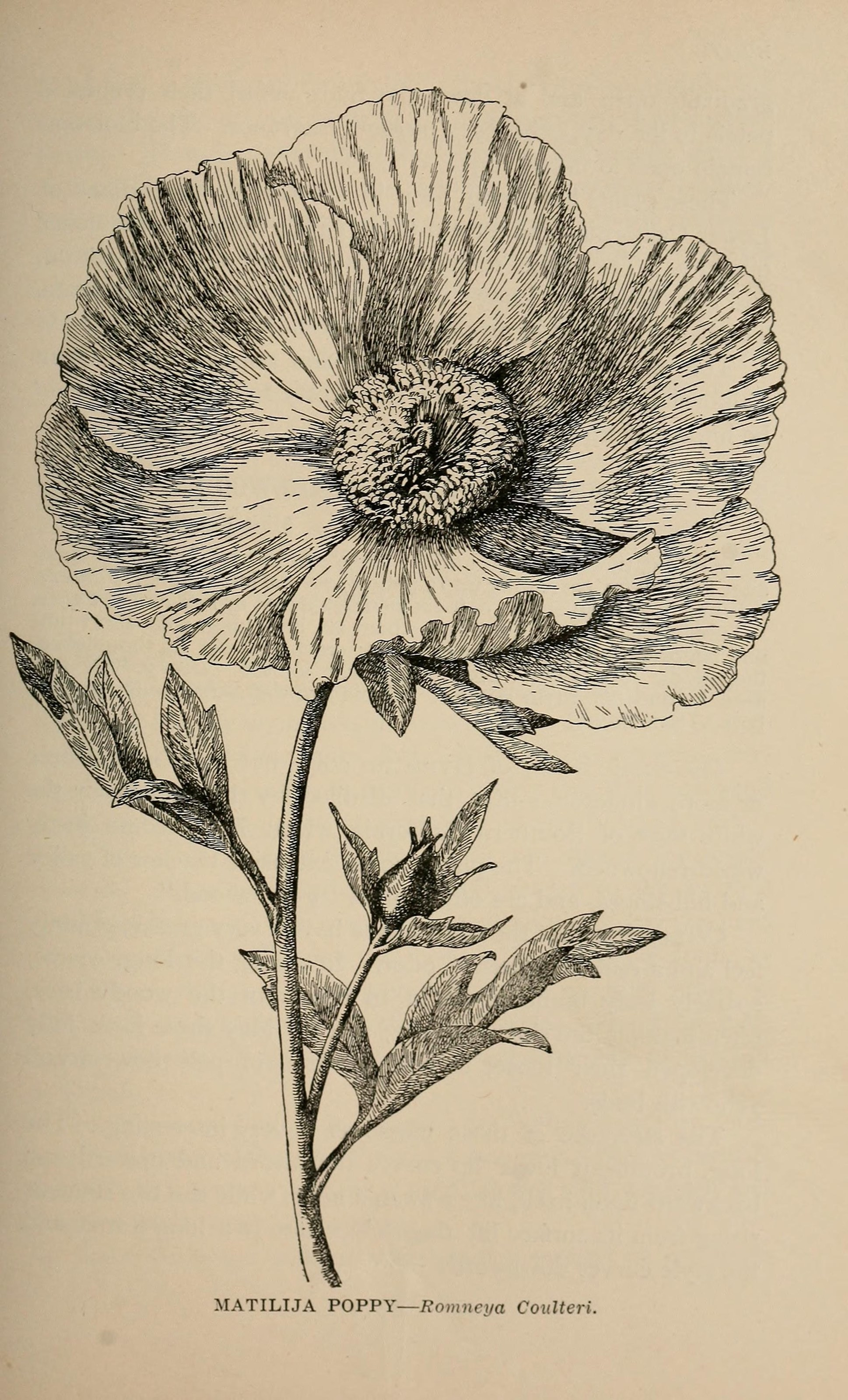
The Wild Flowers of California (1902), p. 65; Matilija poppy, Romncya coulteri

Mary Elizabeth Parsons was born in Chicago, Illinois, in 1859. She studied art in San Francisco in the 1890s, where Alice Brown Chittenden was her sketching partner.

In the 1890s, Parsons hiked around California with the botanical artist Margaret Warriner Buck, with a view to publishing a book about California flora. The result was the very successful The Wild Flowers of California: Their Names, Haunts, and Habits (1897), written by Parsons with over 100 illustrations engraved from Buck's pen-and-ink drawings. It went through many printings and several editions and was still being reprinted into the 1950s.

Parsons intended her book to complement Mrs. William Starr Dana's very successful How to Know the Wild Flowers (1893) by emphasizing plants that were unknown in the eastern United States where Mrs. Dana lived. With Mrs. Dana's permission, she used the same plan of arranging the flowers by color. The botanist Alice Eastwood and the nurseryman Carl Purdy served as advisers on the project.

For the 1906 edition, a replacement set of printing plates had to be made when the existing set was destroyed in the San Francisco earthquake. This edition was printed in several versions, one of which had the illustrations printed very lightly so that they could be hand-colored afterwards by the buyer.

Parsons died in Kentfield, California, in 1947.
