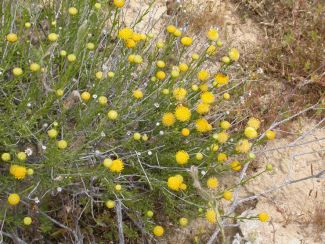

Conservation status
- Vulnerable (NatureServe)

Scientific classification
- Kingdom: Plantae
- Clade: Tracheophytes
- Clade: Angiosperms
- Clade: Eudicots
- Clade: Asterids
- Order: Asterales
- Family: Asteraceae
- Subfamily: Asteroideae
- Tribe: Astereae
- Subtribe: Solidagininae
- Genus: Eastwoodia; Brandegee
- Species: E. elegans

Binomial name
- Eastwoodia elegans Brandegee

= Eastwoodia =

Genus of flowering plants

Eastwoodia is a North American genus of plants in the family Asteraceae. It contains the single species Eastwoodia elegans, a flower known by the common name yellow mock aster or yellow aster. It is endemic to California. This plant is found only on the grasslands and hillsides of central California, from the Bay Area south to the Tehachapis.

Eastwoodia elegansis is a shrub which sends up several erect and branched stems up to 40 inches (100 cm) tall. One plant can produce several yellow flower heads, each containing as many as 40 disc florets but no ray florets. The stems have a shredding bark and small leaves rarely more than 2 inches (5 cm) long.

The genus was named for the Canadian-American botanist Alice Eastwood, 1859–1953.
