= Alice Eastwood =

Canadian American botanist (1859–1953)

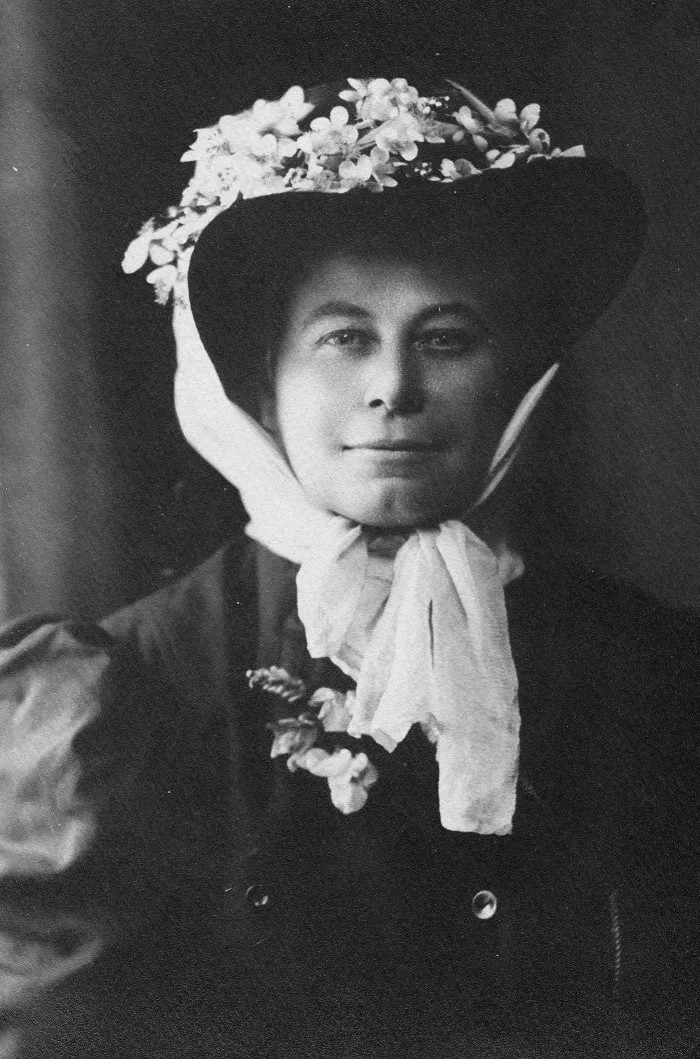
- Born: January 19, 1859; Toronto, Canada West
- Died: October 30, 1953 (aged 94); San Francisco, California, United States
- Resting place: Toronto Necropolis
- Scientific career
- Fields: Botany
- Workplaces: California Academy of Sciences; Gray Herbarium; New York Botanical Garden; British Museum; Royal Botanic Gardens at Kew
- Author abbrev. (botany): Eastw.

Alice Eastwood (January 19, 1859 – October 30, 1953) was a Canadian American botanist. She is credited with building the botanical collection at the California Academy of Sciences in San Francisco. She published over 310 scientific articles and authored 395 land plant species names, the fourth-highest number of such names authored by any female scientist. There are seventeen recognized species named for her, as well as the genera Eastwoodia and Aliciella.

Born in Canada West, Eastwood spent some of her childhood in Canada before moving to Denver, Colorado as a teenager. Here she graduated high school and worked as a school teacher to make a living. She taught herself botanical skills and spent her summers collecting specimens in the mountains of Colorado.

After time spent traveling in California, Eastwood got a job working at the California Academy of Science's herbarium. She eventually took over as Curator of the Botany Department there, a position she would hold until her retirement at age 90. When a destructive earthquake shook San Francisco, Eastwood saved the type plant collection of the academy from the fires that followed. After the reconstruction of the academy, she worked to replace the specimens that had been lost, making collecting expeditions across the Western United States.

Eastwood received widespread recognition for her contributions to science, and a year after her retirement at age 91 she served as the Honorary President of the VII International Botanical Congress.

== Early life ==
Alice Eastwood was born on January 19, 1859, in Toronto, Canada West, to Colin Skinner Eastwood and Eliza Jane Gowdey Eastwood. Her father worked at the Toronto Asylum for the Insane. When she was six her mother died; Eastwood and her siblings were cared for by various relatives, and for a time, Alice and her sister were placed at the Oshawa Convent in Toronto. In 1873, Eastwood and her siblings were reunited with their father and moved to Denver, Colorado. In 1879, she graduated as valedictorian from East High School, where she then taught for ten years.

Eastwood was a self-taught botanist and learned from published botany manuals including Gray's Manual and the Flora of Colorado. She used her limited teacher's salary to fund summer trips into the Colorado mountains, bringing back botanical specimens which would form the basis of the University of Colorado's herbarium. Her botanical knowledge led her to being asked to guide Alfred Russel Wallace up the summit of Grays Peak in Denver. Eastwood was also a member of Theodore Dru Alison Cockerell's Colorado Biological Association.

== Career ==
Early in her career, Eastwood made collecting expeditions in Colorado and the Four Corners region. She became close with the Wetherill Family, and visited Alamo Ranch in Mesa Verde often, beginning in July 1889. She was considered a part of the family, and so did not sign the guest register on later trips. Each time Eastwood visited, she was particularly welcomed by Al Wetherill, who shared an interest in her work. In 1892, he served as her guide on a 10-day trip to southeastern Utah to collect desert plants. During the same year on an expedition in Colorado, Eastwood collected the type specimen of Oreocarya aperta, a desert flowering plant in the forget-me-not family which she discovered in Mesa County. She published it eleven years later in the Bulletin of the Torrey Botanical Club, and the species is so rare that today it is only known from her collection.

Eastwood also made collecting expeditions to the edge of the Big Sur region, which at the end of the 19th century was a virtual frontier, since no roads penetrated the central coast beyond the Carmel Highlands. On those excursions she discovered several plants, including Hickman's potentilla which she named after J. B. Hickman, her guide for the trip.

Before she moved to San Francisco Eastwood lived in San Diego, an area in which she studied and explored. Here she was inspired to write a biographical essay entitled Early Botanical Explorers on the Pacific Coast and the Trees They Found There, detailing the discoveries of earlier botanists. During this time she also met the notable horticulturalist Kate Sessions with whom she formed a lifelong friendship. The two stayed in correspondence from this point on, and Sessions would send Eastwood specimens to describe and name. In 1920 Sessions was shown a cutting of a striking plant which she had painted and later showed to Eastwood, who named it Ceanothus cyaneus. Eastwood officially published the name seven years later, after she obtained a specimen for the Academy's herbarium.

Eastwood rented an apartment near Nob Hill in San Francisco when she took the job of curator at the academy. An appreciator of all forms of plant life, her daily walks to work inspired her to write an article entitled The Flora of the Nob Hill Cobblestones, originally published in 1898. Within it she identified 64 species of plants, many commonly called weeds, which she collected specimens of for the herbarium. Her work was published in Willis Jepson's journal Erythea under the title Plant Inhabitants of Nob Hill, San Francisco which had been revised unbeknownst to Eastwood. She corrected it years later when it was re-published by the California Botanical Club, as she felt the title misrepresented the nature of her article.

=== California Academy of Sciences ===
In 1891, after reviewing Eastwood's specimen collection in Denver, Mary Katharine Brandegee, Curator of the Botany Department at the California Academy of Sciences, hired Eastwood to work in the academy's herbarium. In 1892, she was promoted to a position as joint curator of the academy with Brandegee. By 1894, with the retirement of Brandegee, Eastwood was procurator and Head of the Department of Botany, a position she held until she retired in 1949.

Eastwood is credited with saving the academy's type plant collection after the 1906 San Francisco earthquake. Departing from the curatorial conventions of her era, Eastwood segregated the type specimens from the main collection. This classification system permitted her to retrieve 1,497 specimens from the damaged building. The cabinet she had stored them in was damaged; using her apron, she lowered the specimens from a window to a friend as the fire after the earthquake approached, then commandeered a wagon. The specimens and records she saved were almost all that survived of the academy's collection.

An herbarium specimen collected by Alice Eastwood in 1900 of Allium hickmanii, a species which she described and named.

After the earthquake, before the academy had constructed a new building, Eastwood studied in herbaria in Europe and other U.S. regions, including the Gray Herbarium, the New York Botanical Garden, the National Museum of Natural History of Paris, the British Museum, and the Royal Botanic Gardens at Kew. In 1912, with completion of the new academy facilities at Golden Gate Park, Eastwood returned to the position of curator of the herbarium and reconstructed the lost part of the collection. She went on numerous collecting vacations in the Western United States, including Alaska (1914), Arizona, Utah and Idaho. Her well-known exsiccata-like series of plant specimens from California has in parts printed labels entitled California Academy of Sciences, Flora of California. Starting in 1928, Eastwood accompanied fellow botanist Susan Delano McKelvey on several collecting expeditions in the Southwest and they built a lasting collaboration, frequently corresponding and exchanging specimens. By keeping the first set of each collection for the academy and exchanging the duplicates with other institutions, Eastwood was able to build the collection, Abrams noting that she contributed "thousands of sheets to the Academy's herbarium, personally accounting for its growth in size and representation of western flora". By 1942 she had built the collection to about one third of a million specimens, nearly three times the number of specimens destroyed in the 1906 fire.

During her time as curator, Eastwood also helped John McLaren to plan Golden Gate Park, ensuring a wide diversity of horticultural plantings. She helped to create the Shakespeare Garden within the park, and in 1971 the Alice Eastwood Garden was named by the San Francisco Garden Club in her honor.

Eastwood published over 310 scientific articles during her career. She served as editor of the biological journal Zoe and as an assistant editor for Erythea before the 1906 earthquake, and founded a journal, Leaflets of Western Botany (1932–1966), with John Thomas Howell. Eastwood was director of the San Francisco Botanical Club for several years throughout the 1890s. In 1929, she helped to form the American Fuchsia Society. She also served as an advisor for Mary Elizabeth Parsons' comprehensive book The Wild Flowers of California: Their Names, Haunts, and Habits.

Her main botanical interests were western U.S. Liliaceae and the genera Lupinus, Arctostaphylos and Castilleja.

Eastwood died from cancer in San Francisco on October 30, 1953. The California Academy of Sciences retains a collection of her papers and works.

== Gallery ==

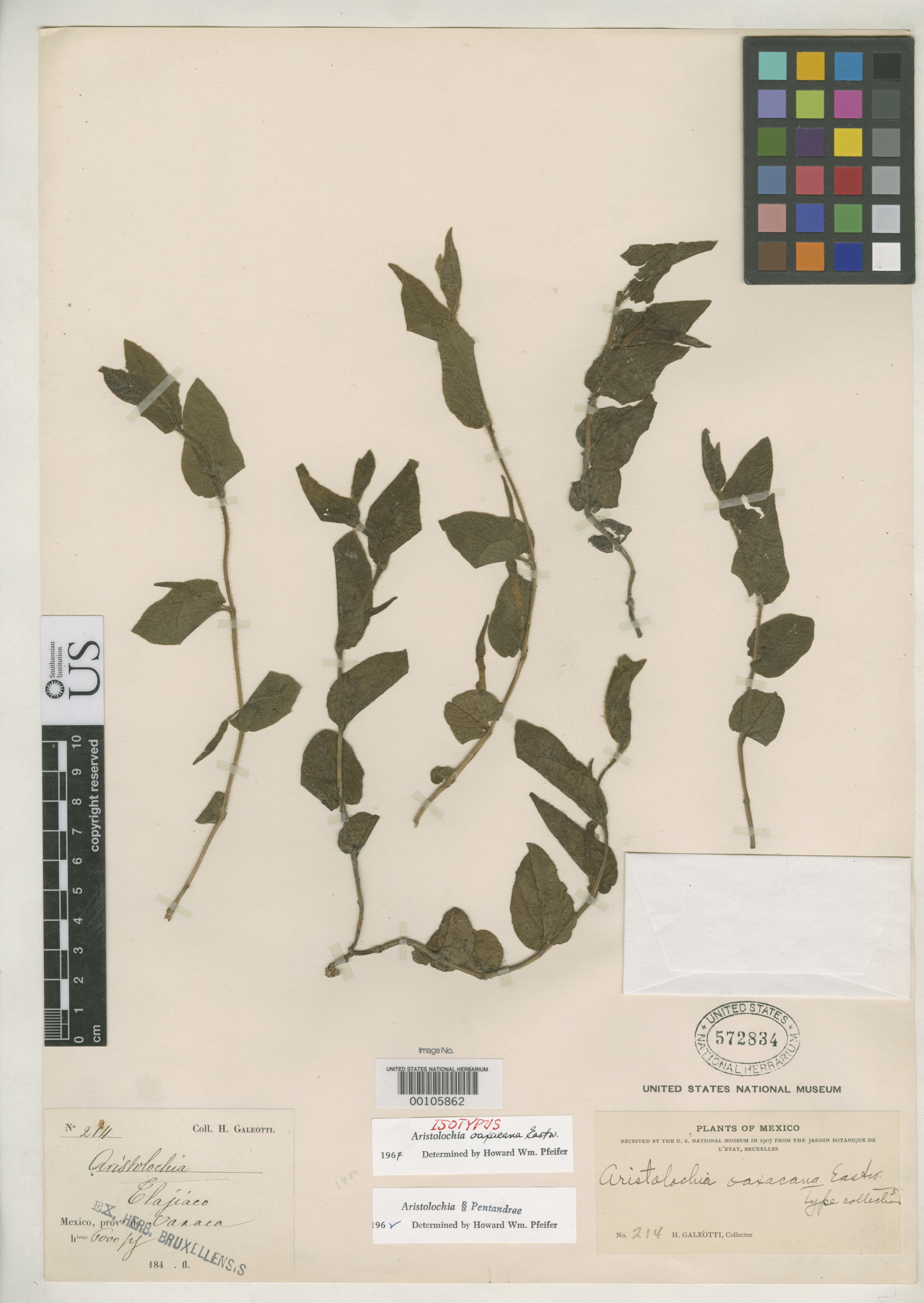

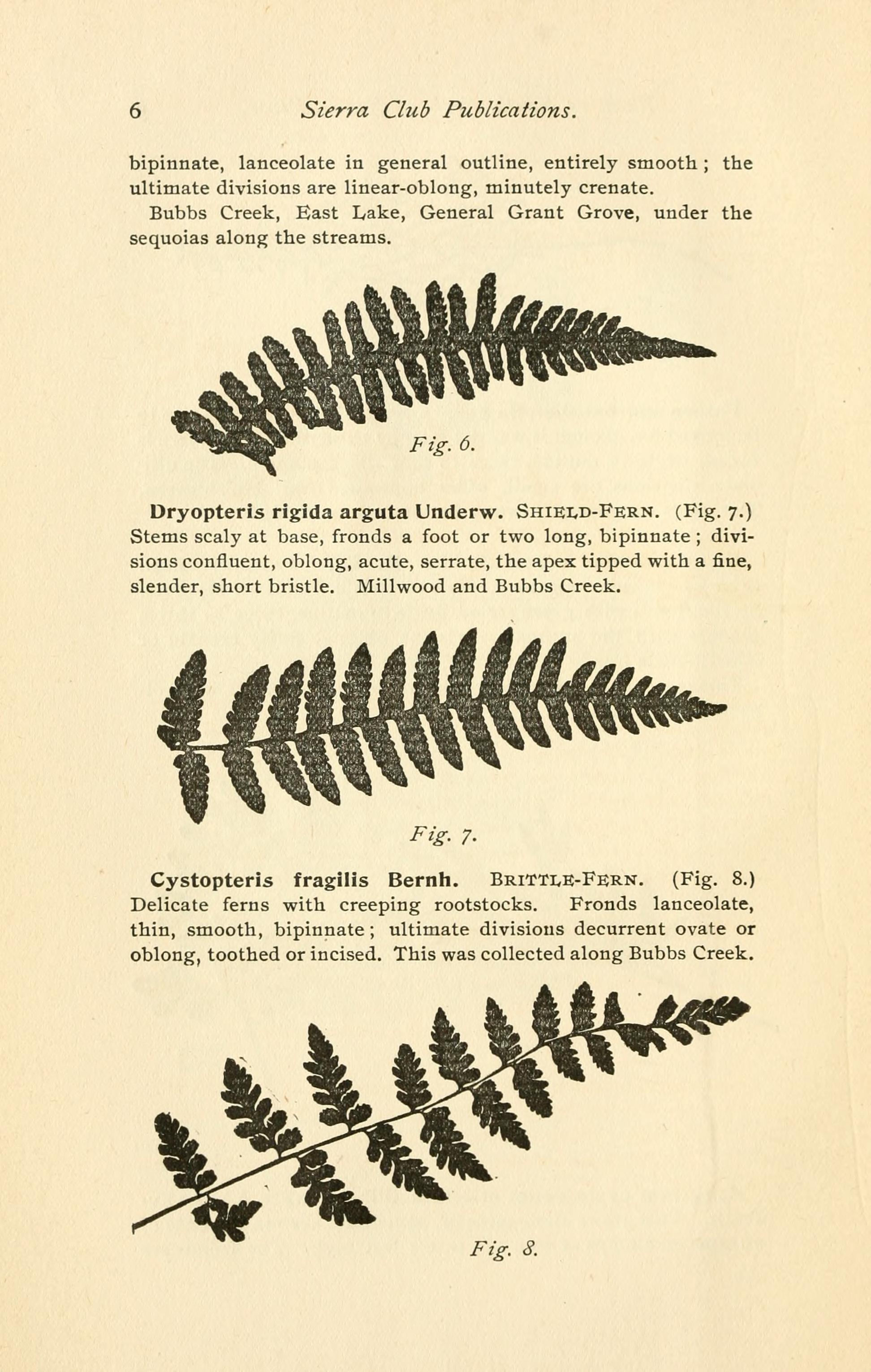

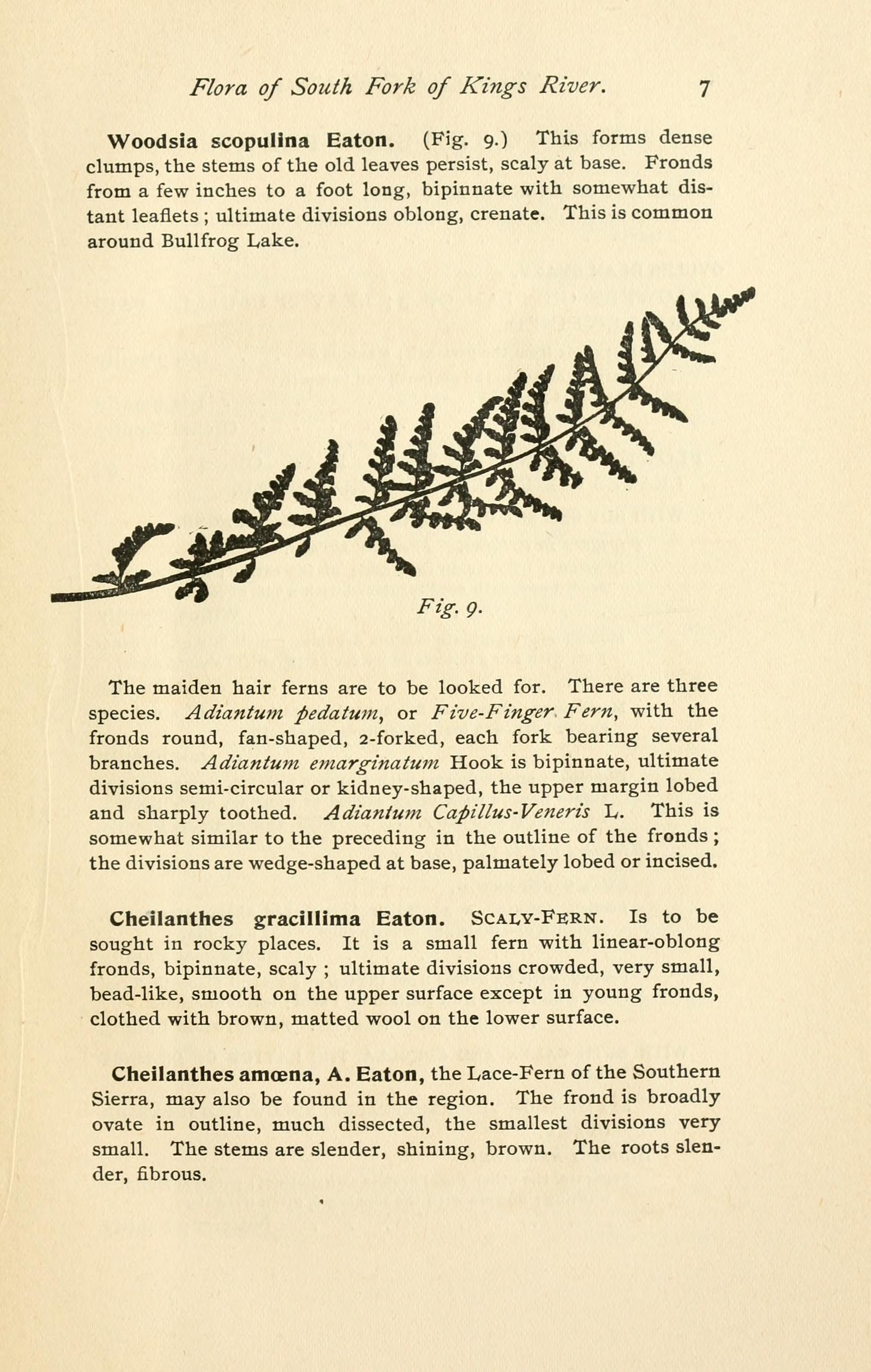

== Recognition ==
- There are currently seventeen recognized species named for Eastwood, as well as the genera Aliciella, Eastwoodia and Eastwoodiella.
- A member of the California Academy of Sciences since 1892, she was unanimously elected an honorary member of the academy in 1942.
- In 1959, the CAS opened the Eastwood Hall of Botany
- In 1903 she was one of only two women listed in American Men of Science to be denoted, by a star as among the top 25% of professionals in their discipline.
- In 1949, in recognition of her achievements, the American Fuchsia Society awarded her with its Medal of Achievement.
- In 1950 at age 91, she was invited to Sweden to serve as the Honorary President of the VII International Botanical Congress.
- She was honored in the binomial name of Boletus eastwoodiae, an attractive though poisonous bolete of western North America which she collected. However, this was renamed Boletus pulcherrimus due to a misidentification of type material. It still bears the common name of Alice Eastwood's bolete.
- Eastwood worked to save a redwood grove in Humboldt County, which was later named Alice Eastwood Memorial Grove.

=== Plant species named after Eastwood ===
- Agoseris apargioides var. eastwoodiae (woolly goat chicory, Eastwood's seaside agoseris, Beach Dandelion)
- Arctostaphylos crustacea ssp. eastwoodiana (Eastwood's Brittleleaf Manzanita)
- Arctostaphylos glandulosa ssp. glandulosa (Eastwood's Manzanita)
- Amsinckia eastwoodiae (Eastwood's Fiddleneck)
- Delphinium parryi ssp. eastwoodiae (Eastwood's larkspur)
- Erigeron aliceae
- Erythranthe (Mimulus) eastwoodiae (Eastwood's Monkeyflower)
- Fritillaria eastwoodiae (Butte County fritillary)
- Malacothamnus eastwoodiae (Alice's lovely bushmallow)
- Podistera (Lomatium) eastwoodiae (Eastwood's Woodroot)
- Salix eastwoodiae (Eastwood's willow)

=== Genera named after Eastwood ===
- Aliciella
- Eastwoodia
- Eastwoodiella

== See also ==
- Rare species
- Monterey Peninsula
- Timeline of women in science
- Rubroboletus eastwoodiae

== Selected publications online ==
- Bergen's botany (1901) With Joseph Young Bergen.
- A flora of the South Fork of Kings River (1902)
- Leaflets of western botany Vol. 1–10 with index (1932–1966) With J.T. Howell.
- Zoe: a biological journal Vol. 3–4. (1892) With K.L. Brandegee and T.S. Brandegee. Retrieved 2009-08-19.
- A Handbook of the Trees of California (1905) San Francisco, California Academy of Sciences.
