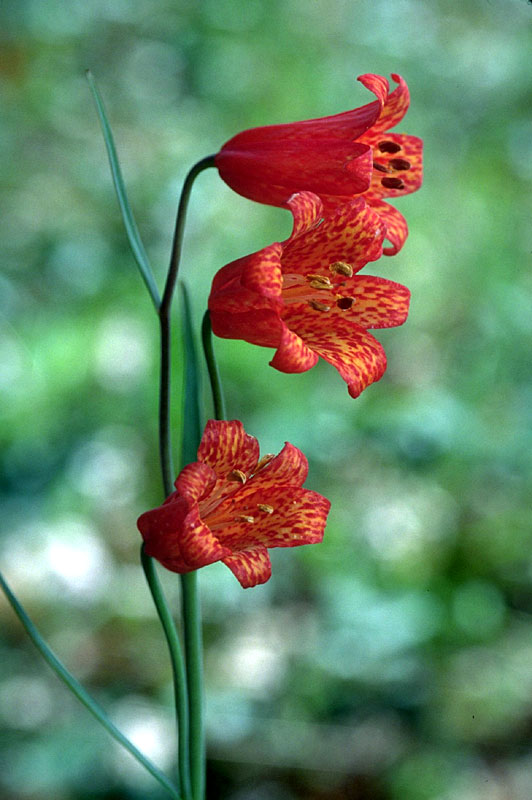

Scientific classification
- Kingdom: Plantae
- Clade: Tracheophytes
- Clade: Angiosperms
- Clade: Monocots
- Order: Liliales
- Family: Liliaceae
- Subfamily: Lilioideae
- Tribe: Lilieae
- Genus: Fritillaria
- Species: F. recurva

Binomial name
- Fritillaria recurva Benth.

Synonyms
- Fritillaria coccinea (Greene) Greene; Fritillaria recurva var. coccinea Greene

= Fritillaria recurva =

Scarlet fritillary

Species of flowering plant

Fritillaria recurva, the scarlet fritillary, is a North American bulb-forming herbaceous perennial plant in the lily family Liliaceae. It is native to the western United States, from southwest Oregon down to northern California where it grows in the Klamath Mountains, Northern Coast Ranges, Cascade Range, and Sierra Nevada. Most of the known Californian locations are in the northern half of the state, as far south as Solano and El Dorado Counties, but there are isolated populations in Tulare and Mariposa Counties. The species has also been reported from Douglas and Washoe Counties in Nevada. It grows in dry, open woodlands and chaparral at 300–2,200 metres (980–7,220 ft), and it blooms in spring from February to July.

== Description ==
Fritillaria recurva is a bulb-forming perennial. The leaves are arranged in whorls and are linear to narrowly lanceolate. The tepals are scarlet, checkered with yellow on the inside, and form a bell shape, and are usually nodding and pendent. The Latin specific epithet "recurva" means "bent backwards". The fruit is a winged capsule.

The plant blooms from June to October, about two weeks earlier than F. gentneri, which has a different reddish color. Throughout its range it is distinguishable from other Fritillaria species by its scarlet red color, checkered with yellow on the inside, and recurved tepals. Hybrids among the 10 species of Fritillaria make identification challenging.

In southwest Oregon F. recurva is similar to the rare F. gentneri. The latter can be distinguished from F. recurva by its branching style and longer nectary glands.

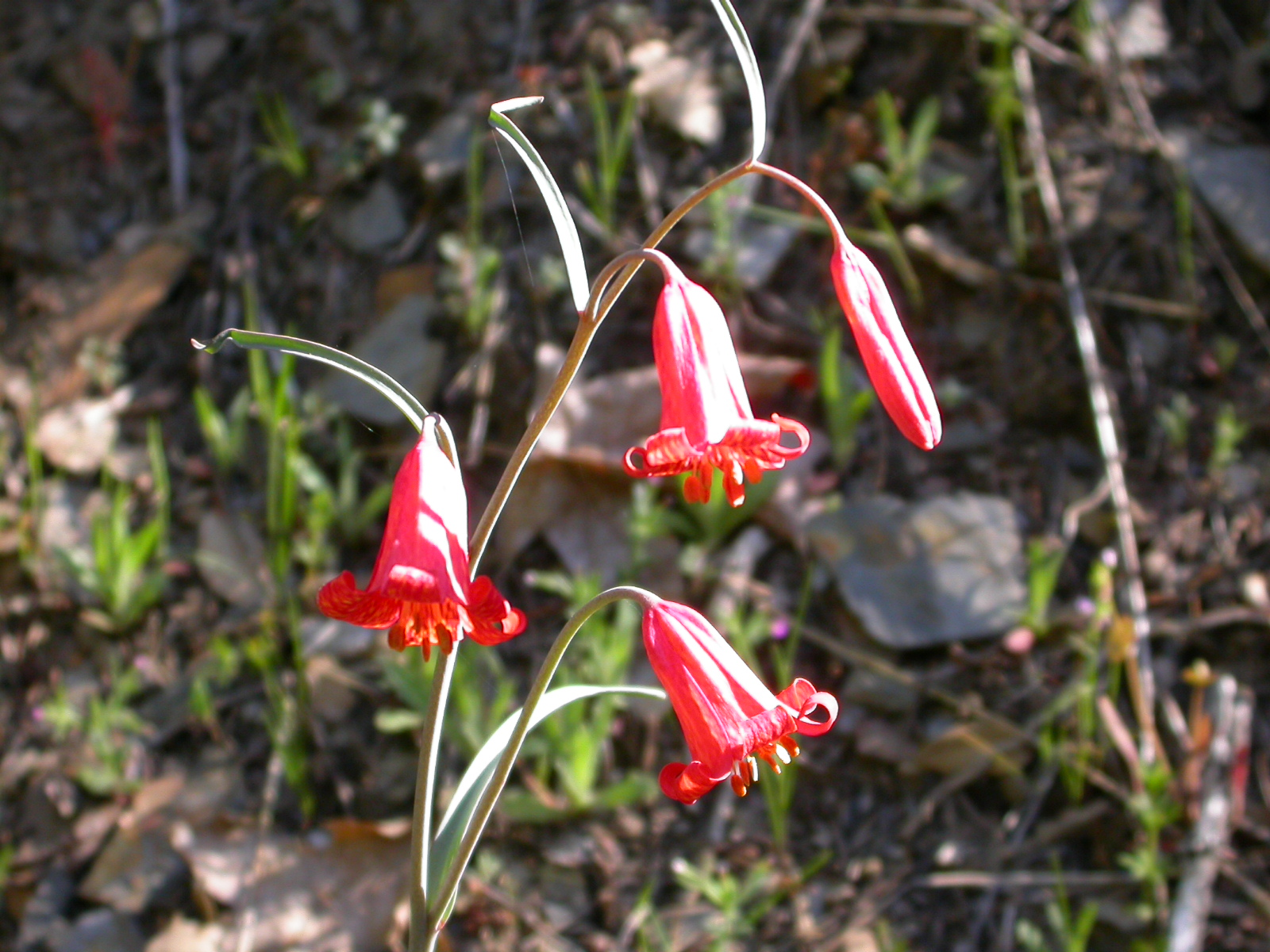

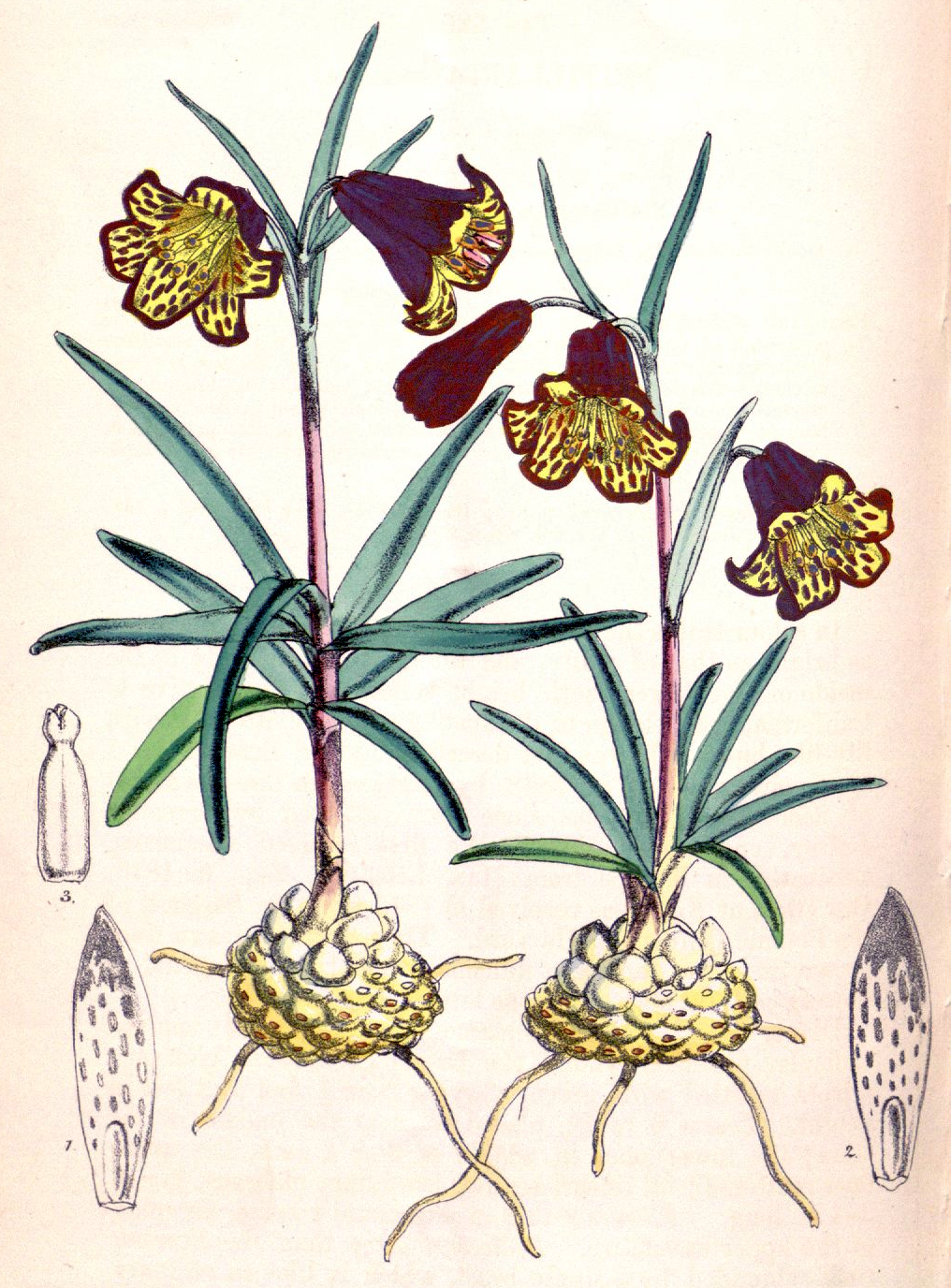

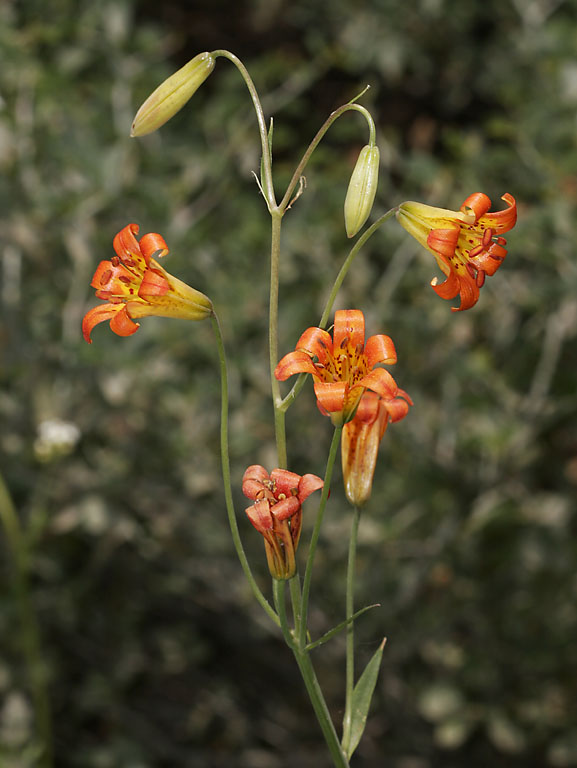
