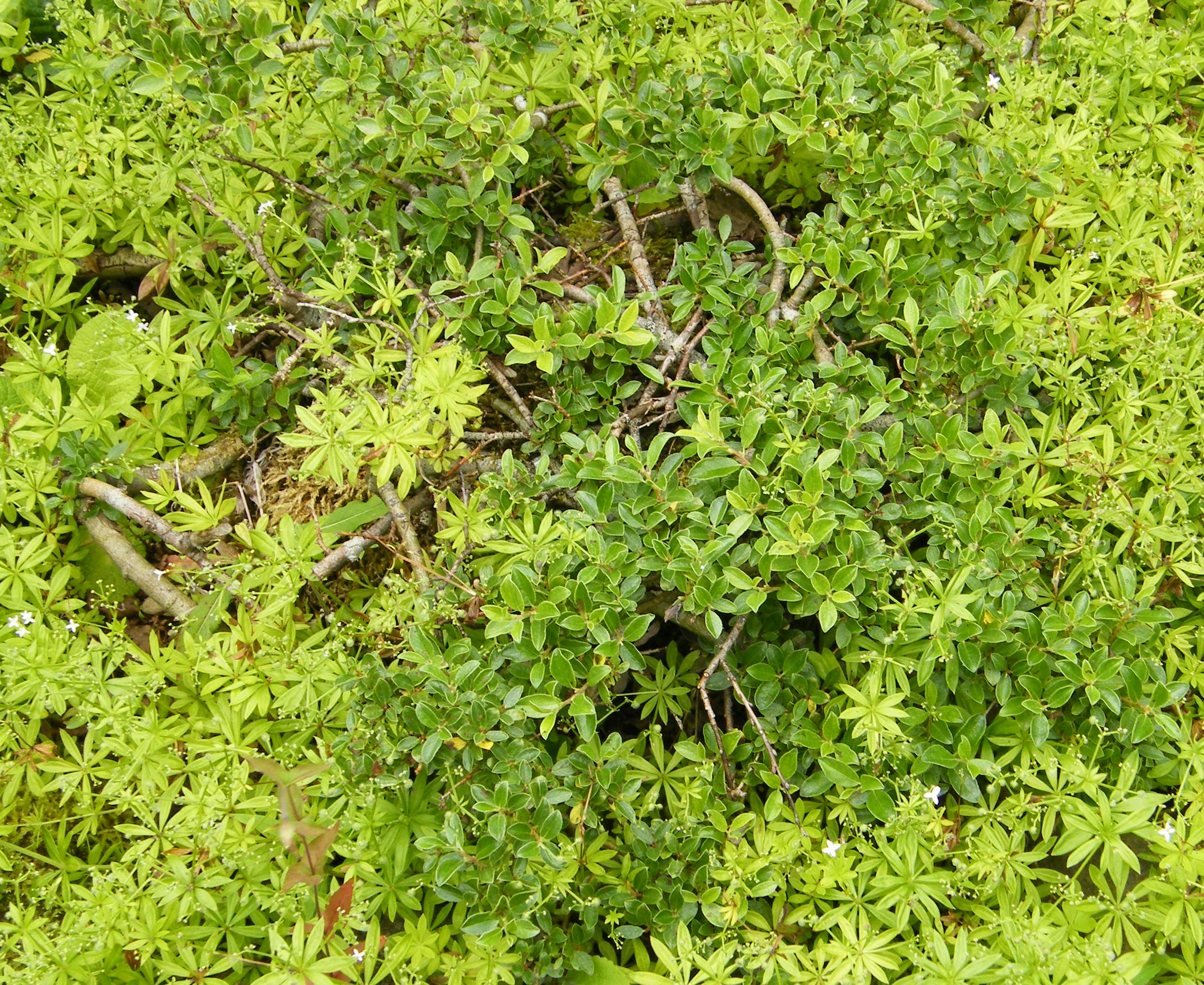
- General view: in the center, surrounded by Galium odoratum

Scientific classification
- Kingdom: Plantae
- Clade: Tracheophytes
- Clade: Angiosperms
- Clade: Eudicots
- Clade: Rosids
- Order: Malpighiales
- Family: Salicaceae
- Genus: Salix
- Species: S. arbuscula

Binomial name
- Salix arbuscula L.

= Salix arbuscula =

Species of shrub

Salix arbuscula, the mountain willow, is a low, much branched shrub (to 0.7 metres) having a limited distribution in Northern Europe, occurring from north Scandinavia eastwards to Siberia. In Scotland it can be found on damp rocky mountain slopes and ledges, generally at altitudes above 600 metres, rarely outside Perthshire and Argyll.

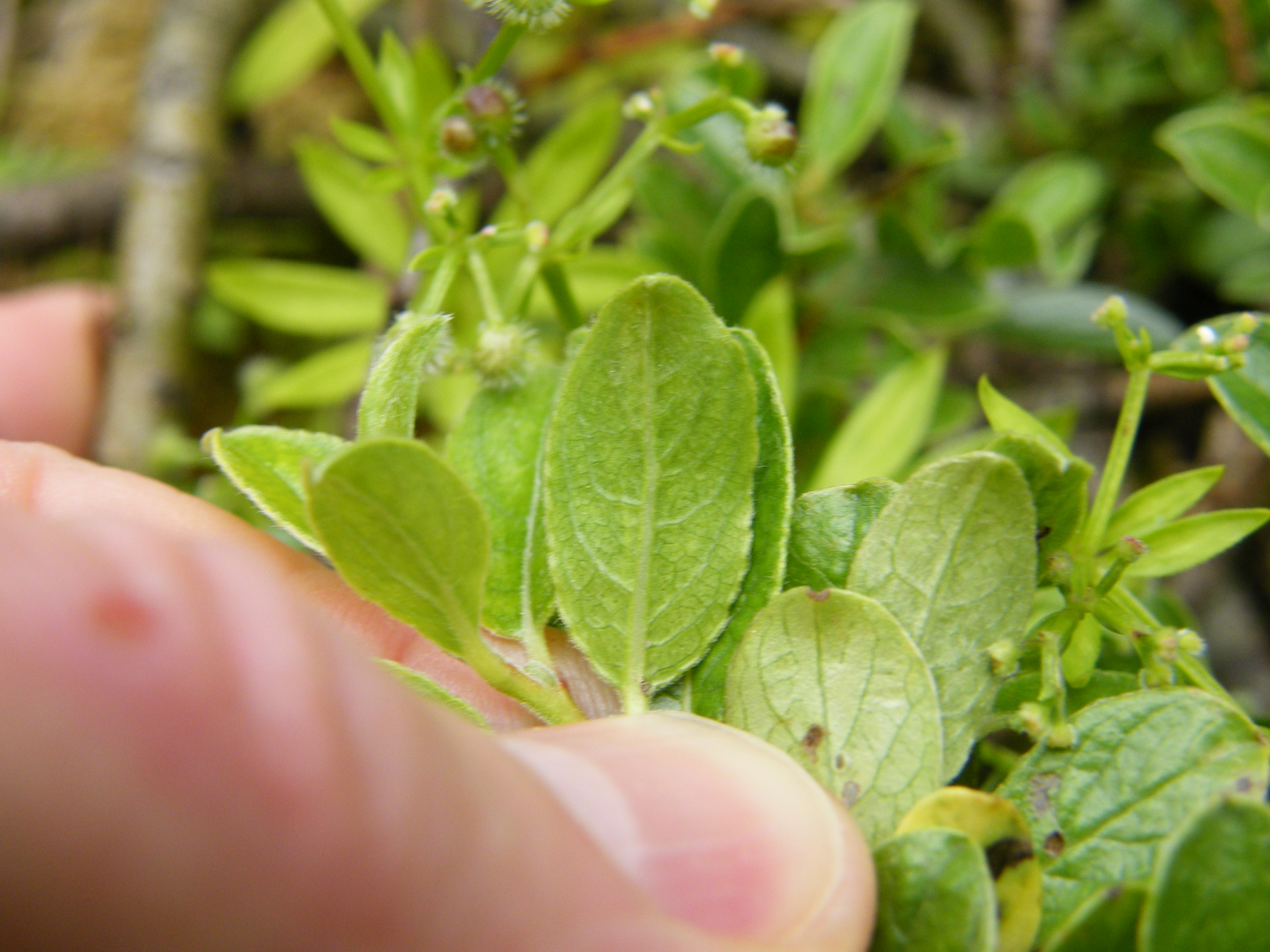
Lower surface of leaf

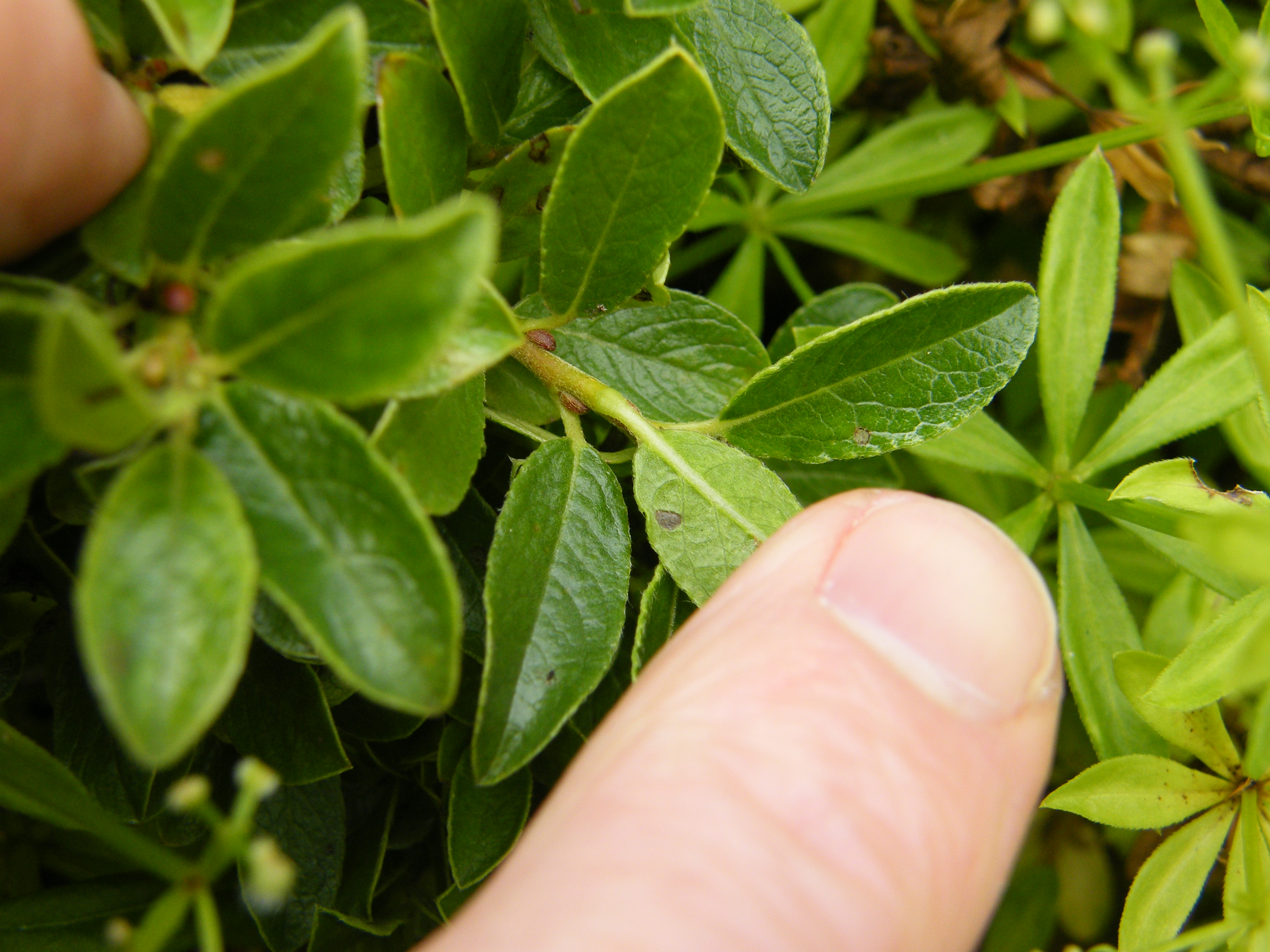
Petiole

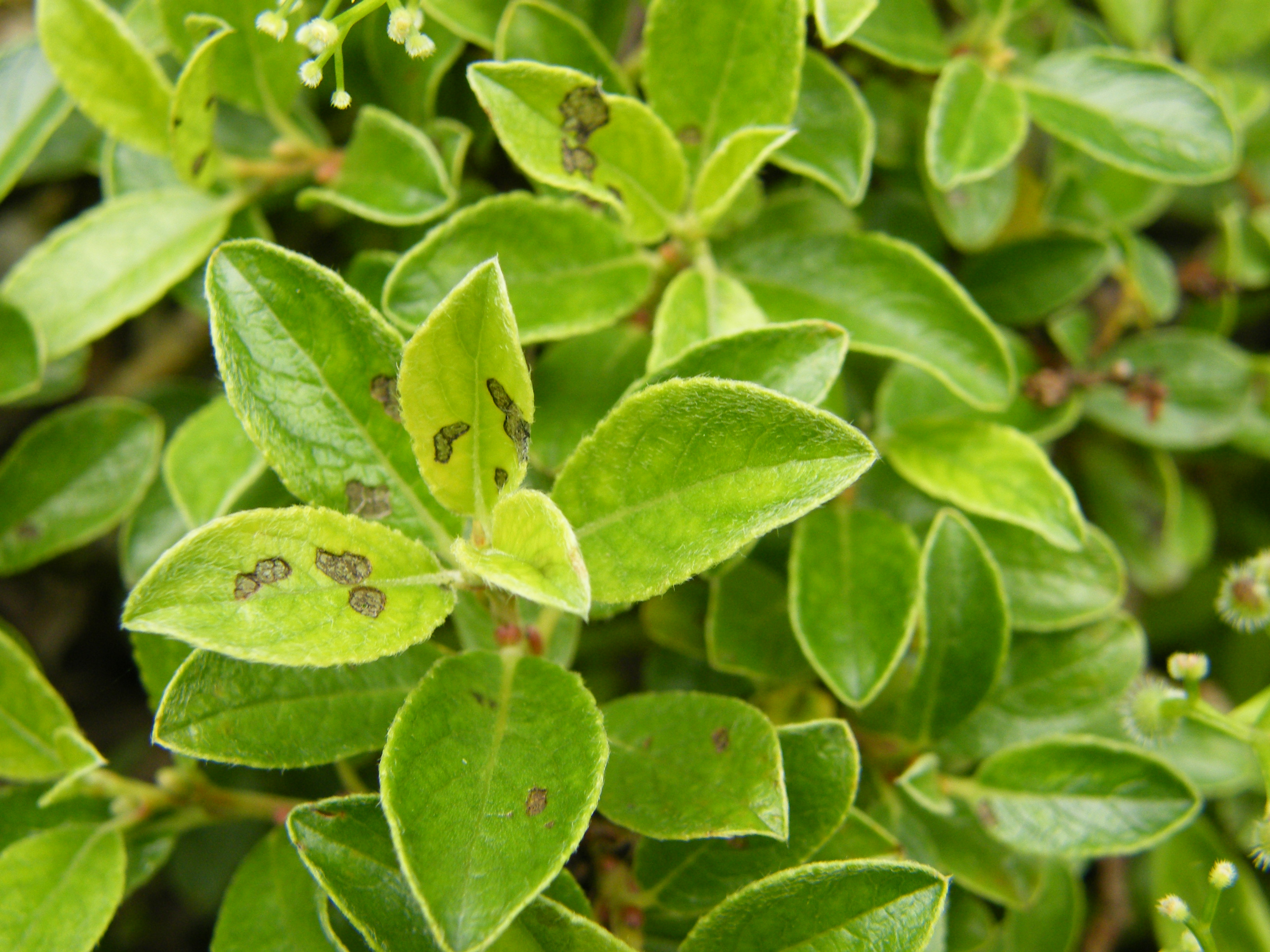
Upper surface of leaf

As described in Stace and BSBI Salix arbuscula has the following characteristics:

- Twigs slightly hairy at first, later hairless and dark reddish brown.
- Leaves usually ovate up to 5 cm long by 3 cm wide; hairless and bright green on upper side; at first densely hairy on lower side, then hairless; margins with numerous small blunt teeth.
- Petiole short, occasionally up to 8mm long but usually less than 5mm.
