= Fritillaria micrantha =

Scientific classification
- Kingdom: Plantae
- Clade: Tracheophytes
- Clade: Angiosperms
- Clade: Monocots
- Order: Liliales
- Family: Liliaceae
- Subfamily: Lilioideae
- Genus: Fritillaria
- Species: F. micrantha

Binomial name
- Fritillaria micrantha A.Heller

Synonyms
- Fritillaria parviflora Torr. 1857, illegitimate homonym not Mart. 1838

Species of flowering plant

Fritillaria micrantha, the brown fritillary or brown bells, is a Californian species of flowering plant in the lily family Liliaceae.

== Description ==
It grows an erect stem up to 1–1.5 m (3.3–4.9 ft) in height. The long, straight, very narrow leaves grow in whorls about the lower stem and in pairs near the top. The stem has one or more pendent, nodding flowers at each node. The flower has six narrow tepals, each 1–2 cm (0.39–0.79 in) long. They are variable in appearance but are usually purplish to greenish-yellow and often mottled or edged with color. The fruit capsule is winged.

== Distribution ==
This wildflower is native to the Sierra Nevada of California, USA, where it is a common resident of dry mountain slopes, and to the foothills west of the main range. There is also one report of the species in the Diablo Range in San Benito County.
