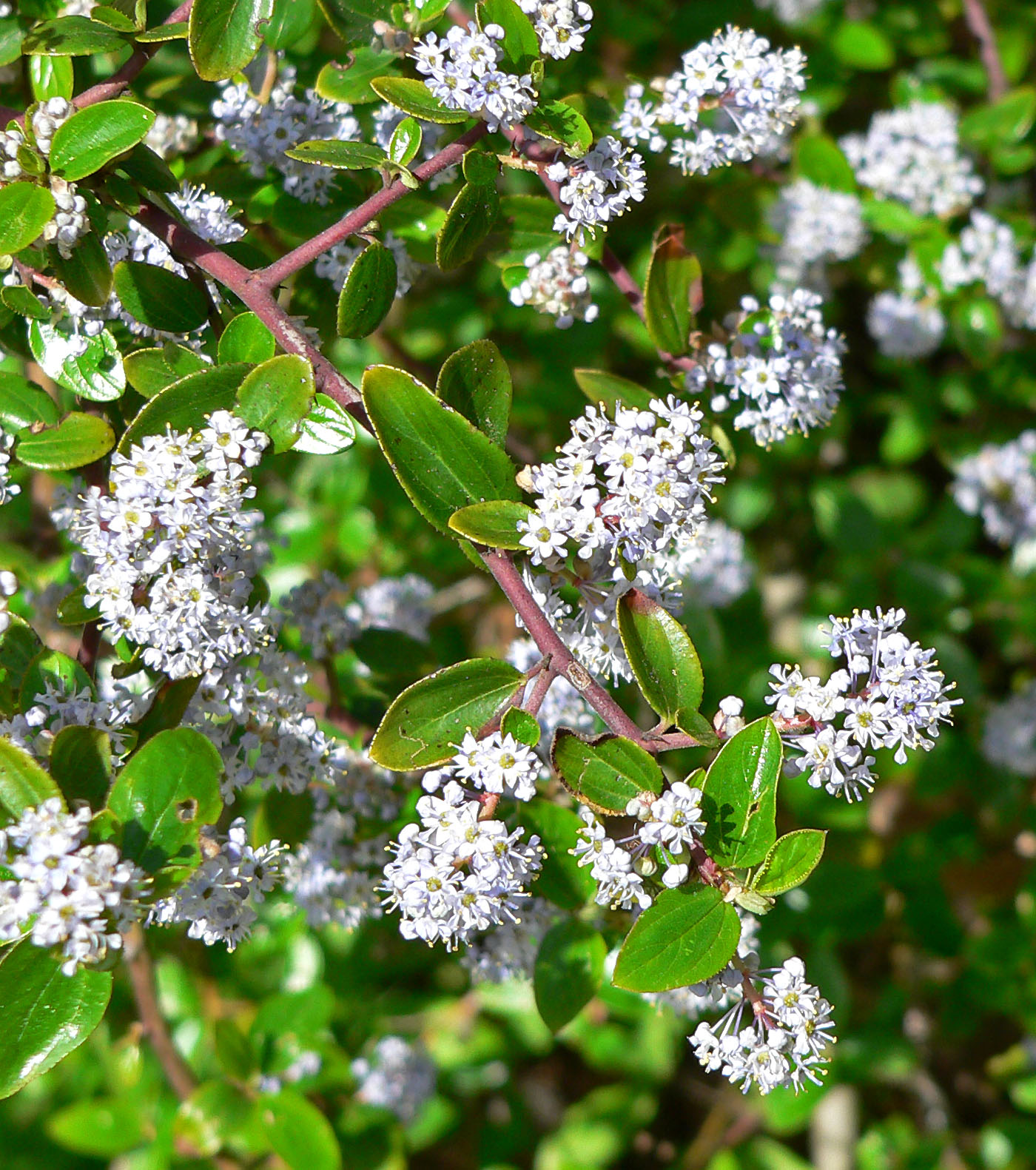
- Ceanothus oliganthus var. sorediatus

Conservation status
- Least Concern (IUCN 3.1)

- Vulnerable (NatureServe)

Scientific classification
- Kingdom: Plantae
- Clade: Tracheophytes
- Clade: Angiosperms
- Clade: Eudicots
- Clade: Rosids
- Order: Rosales
- Family: Rhamnaceae
- Genus: Ceanothus
- Species: C. oliganthus

Binomial name
- Ceanothus oliganthus Nutt.

Varieties
- Ceanothus oliganthus var. oliganthus; Ceanothus oliganthus var. orcutii (Parry) Jeps.; Ceanothus oliganthus var. sorediatus (Hook. & Arn.) Hoover

Synonyms
- synonyms of var. oliganthus: Ceanothus divaricatus Nutt.; Ceanothus hirsutus Nutt.; Ceanothus hirsutus var. orcuttii Trel.; Ceanothus oliganthus var. hirsutus K.Brandegee; synonyms of var. orcutii: Ceanothus orcuttii Parry; synonyms of var. sorediatus: Ceanothus collinus Douglas ex Knowles & Westc.; Ceanothus hirsutus var. glaber (S.Watson) S.Watson; Ceanothus intricatus Parry; Ceanothus nitidus Torr.; Ceanothus oliganthus subsp. sorediatus (Hook. & Arn.) C.L.Schmidt; Ceanothus sorediatus Hook. & Arn.; Ceanothus sorediatus var. glaber S.Watson

= Ceanothus oliganthus =

Species of flowering plant

Ceanothus oliganthus is a species of shrub in the family Rhamnaceae known by the common name hairy ceanothus or hairy-leaf ceanothus.

Three varieties are accepted.

- Ceanothus oliganthus var. oliganthus
- Ceanothus oliganthus var. orcutii (Parry) Jeps.
- Ceanothus oliganthus var. sorediatus (Hook. & Arn.) Hoover

The variety of this species known as jimbrush (var. sorediatus) is sometimes treated as a separate species.

== Habitat and range ==
It occurs in California and Baja California, where it occurs through all of the coastal mountain ranges in dry habitat such as chaparral.

== Description ==
This is a large, erect shrub approaching 3 meters in maximum height.

=== Leaves and stems ===
The stipules (small leaf-like structures on the stems at the base of the leaf stem, are thin and fall off early.

The evergreen leaves are alternately arranged and may be up to 4 centimeters long. They are dark green on top, paler and hairy on the underside, and are edged with glandular teeth. Leaves have 3 main veins rising from the base. Leaves have a toothed edge. The leaf is covered with short, soft hairs on the top.

Branchlets are flexible, not stiff.

=== Inflorescence and fruit ===
The inflorescence is a cluster or series of clusters of blue or purple flowers.

The fruit is a capsule which may be hairy or not, depending on variety.

The fruit is not horned.

It blooms April to May.
