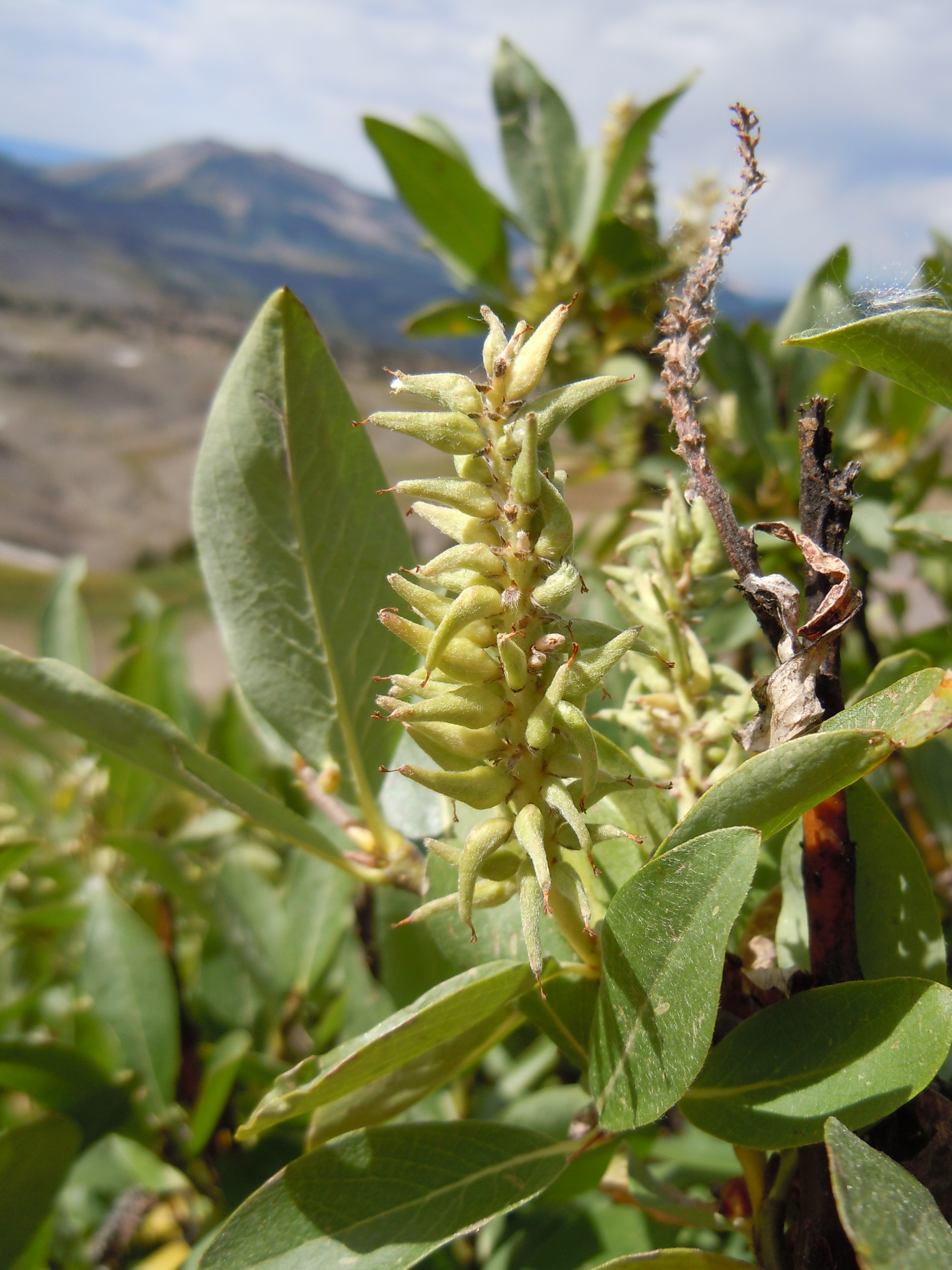

Scientific classification
- Kingdom: Plantae
- Clade: Tracheophytes
- Clade: Angiosperms
- Clade: Eudicots
- Clade: Rosids
- Order: Malpighiales
- Family: Salicaceae
- Genus: Salix
- Species: S. eastwoodiae

Binomial name
- Salix eastwoodiae Cockerell ex. A.Heller

= Salix eastwoodiae =

Species of willow

Salix eastwoodiae is a species of willow known by the common names mountain willow, Eastwood's willow, and Sierra willow. It was first described by Bebb in 1879 as Salix californica. This name was later found to be illegitimate, as Lesquereux had given the same name to a fossil willow in 1878.

It is native to California, Nevada, and the north-western United States. It grows in subalpine and alpine climates in mountain habitats such as talus and streambanks.

== Description ==
Salix eastwoodiae is a shrub growing up to 4 m (13 ft) tall, with branches yellowish, brown, red, or purplish in color and coated in short hairs, sometimes becoming hairless. The leaves are narrowly or widely lance-shaped and up to 10 cm long, hairy when new and becoming hairless.

The inflorescence is a catkin of flowers. The bloom period is May to July.
