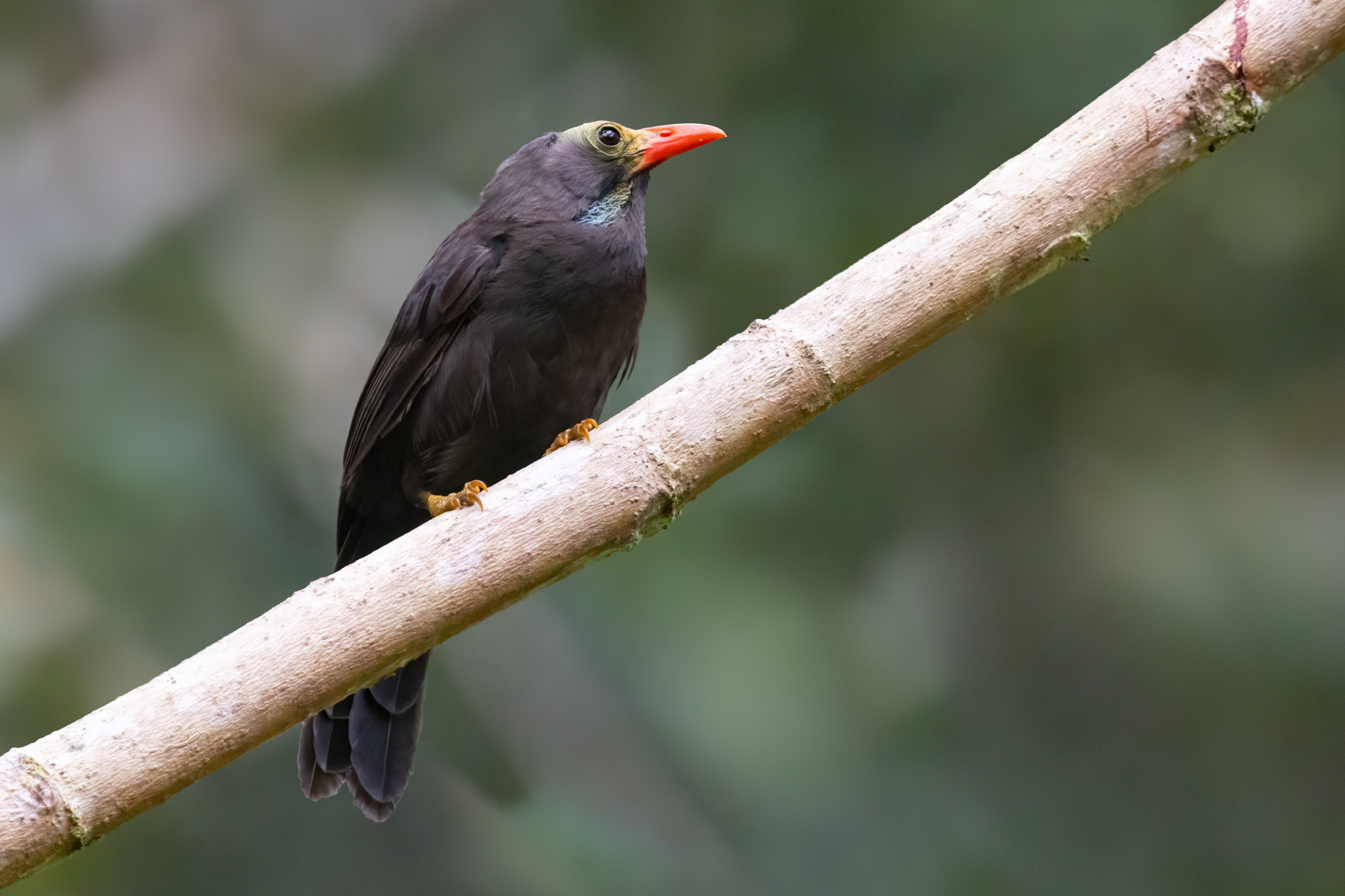

Conservation status
- Least Concern (IUCN 3.1)

Scientific classification
- Kingdom: Animalia
- Phylum: Chordata
- Class: Aves
- Order: Passeriformes
- Family: Timaliidae
- Genus: Melanocichla
- Species: M. calva

Binomial name
- Melanocichla calva (Sharpe, 1888)

Synonyms
- Allocotops calvus Sharpe, 1888; Garrulax calvus (Sharpe, 1888); Garrulax lugubris calvus (Sharpe, 1888); Melanocichla lugubris calvus (Sharpe, 1888)

= Bare-headed laughingthrush =

Species of bird endemic to Borneo

The bare-headed laughingthrush (Melanocichla calva) is a species of bird in the Old World babbler family Timaliidae. It is endemic to highland forests at elevations of 750–1,800 m (2,460–5,910 ft) in the mountain ranges of north-central Borneo, along with some outlying peaks. It is 25–26 cm (9.8–10.2 in) long, with both sexes similar in appearance. The head is brownish to greenish yellow and featherless. The area along the lower mandible has a bluish tinge. The rest of the body is dull blackish-brown tinged with grey. Juveniles have more feathers on the head, extending from the forehead to the crown.

Described by the British ornithologist Richard Bowdler Sharpe in 1888, the bare-headed laughingthrush was then treated as a subspecies of the black laughingthrush from 1935 to 2006, when it was restored to full species status. It feeds on insects such as crickets, cicadas, and ants in dense columns of vegetation formed by vines growing around trees. Although it is classified as being of least concern by the International Union for Conservation of Nature, it is threatened by habitat destruction and fragmentation and its population is thought to be decreasing.

== Taxonomy and systematics ==
The bare-headed laughingthrush was described as Allocotops calvus by the British ornithologist Richard Bowdler Sharpe in 1888 on the basis of specimens collected from Mount Kinabalu, Borneo. It was subsequently considered a subspecies of the black laughingthrush (Melanocichla lugubris) by the English zoologist Frederick Nutter Chasen in 1935 and moved into Melanocichla as Melanocichla lugubris calvus. In 1946, the French-American ornithologist Jean Delacour synonymised Melanocichla with Garrulax. In 2006, the British ornithologist Nigel Collar again raised the bare-headed laughingthrush to species status on the basis of differences in appearance. The Spanish ornithologist Josep del Hoyo and colleagues split Garrulax into 11 different genera in 2007, placing the bare-headed and black laughingthrushes in a resurrected Melanocichla.

The name of the genus, Melanocichla, is derived from the Ancient Greek melas, meaning black, and kikhlē, meaning thrush. The specific name calva is from the Neo-Latin calvus, meaning bald. Bare-headed laughingthrush is the official common name designated by the International Ornithologists' Union. Other common names for the species include bare-headed babbler and Bornean bald laughingthrush.

The bare-headed laughingthrush is one of 57 species in the Old World babbler family Timaliidae, a diverse group of birds whose members are found in tropical forests in the Indian subcontinent, Southeast and East Asia, and Indonesia. A 2019 phylogeny by Tianlong Cai and colleagues found the bare-headed laughingthrush to be most closely related to the black laughingthrush. These two species were further sister (most closely related) to the genus Pomatorhinus. The following cladogram shows the relationships within these two genera according to the 2019 phylogeny: (Note: The study treated the bare-headed and black laughingthrushes as a part of Garrulax.)

- - Melanocichla
    - Bare-headed laughingthrush (Melanocichla calva)
    - Black laughingthrush (Melanocichla lugubris)
  - Pomatorhinus
    - - Coral-billed scimitar babbler (Pomatorhinus ferruginosus)
      - Red-billed scimitar babbler (Pomatorhinus ochraceiceps)
    - - Slender-billed scimitar babbler (Pomatorhinus superciliaris)
      - - - Streak-breasted scimitar babbler (Pomatorhinus ruficollis)
          - Taiwan scimitar babbler (Pomatorhinus musicus)
        - - White-browed scimitar babbler (Pomatorhinus schisticeps)
          - - Javan scimitar babbler (Pomatorhinus montanus)
            - - Sri Lanka scimitar babbler (Pomatorhinus melanurus)
              - Indian scimitar babbler (Pomatorhinus horsfieldii)

== Description ==
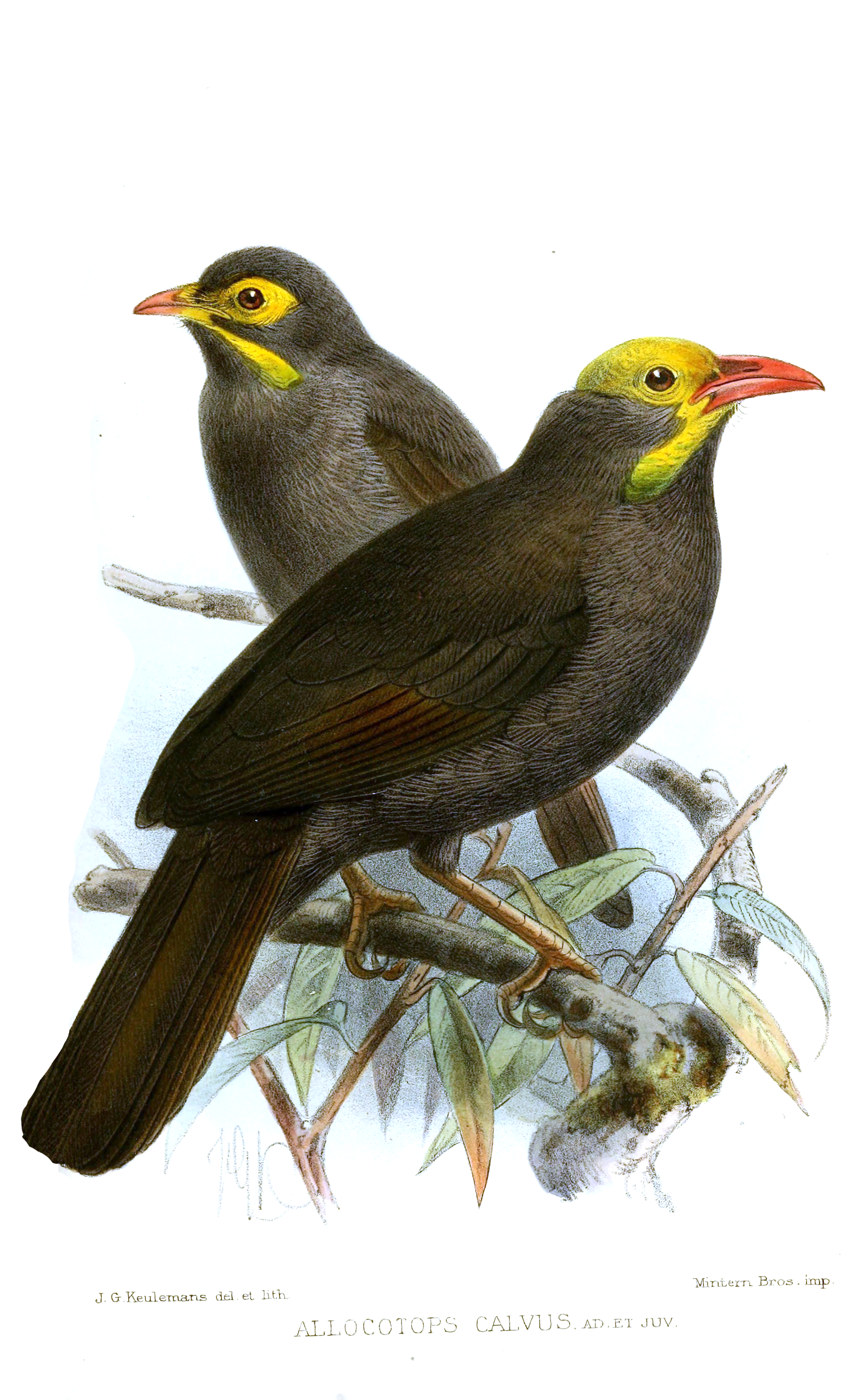
Illustration of adult and juvenile bare-headed laughingthrushes by John Gerrard Keulemans

The bare-headed laughingthrush is 25–26 cm (9.8–10.2 in) long, with both sexes similar in appearance. It has a featherless brownish to greenish yellow head, with the submoustachial region (area along the lower jaw) having a bluish tinge. The rest of the body is dull blackish-brown with a grey tinge. The bill is orange-red, occasionally with a paler tip, while the iris is dark chestnut-brown. The legs are olive-brown with yellow feet. Juveniles have feathers on the forehead up to the crown, with bare skin behind the eye. It is similar to the black laughingthrush, but differs in its bare head, brownish coloration, and slightly shorter bill, wing and tail.

=== Vocalisations ===
The vocalisations of the bare-headed laughingthrush are similar to those of the black laughingthrush. The song is a series of 3–22 deep, resonant ooh or hoo notes given at a frequency of 0.5 kHz. When the song is given in a duet, the ooh notes (thought to be given by males) are accompanied by loud, "comical" yow-yow or woh-woh notes or a loud, grating, mewing weeah (both thought to be given by females). The latter calls are sometimes given alongside both the ooh and yow-yow notes. Other calls include a harsh, petulant queer-queer-hoop-hoop-hoop and a solitary bleat given as a contact call.

== Distribution and habitat ==
Endemic to Borneo, the bare-headed laughingthrush is found in the north-central mountain ranges from Mount Kinabalu to Mount Dulit, along with outlying peaks in extreme eastern Brunei, Kalimantan (the Indonesian part of Borneo), and the Malaysian states of Sabah and Sarawak. It is a montane species, inhabiting broadleaf evergreen forest, secondary forest, and disturbed habitats at elevations of 750–1,800 m (2,460–5,910 ft). It is not migratory.

== Behaviour and ecology ==
Bare-headed laughingthrushes are usually seen in pairs or small flocks, sometimes as a part of mixed-species foraging flocks. They are less active than other species of laughingthrush. The generation length of the species is 4.7 years.

The species feeds on insects like crickets, cicadas, and ants. It creeps about in the lower storey or midstorey of the forest in a lethargic manner, foraging in dense columns of vegetation formed by vines growing around tree trunks. It free-falls through the vines in pursuit of falling insects, sometimes grabbing at perches. It will also occasionally hang upside down like a tit. Ants are gleaned from (plucked from the surface of) bamboo twigs, while larger insects are gleaned from bamboo leaves.

Juveniles have been observed in July and possibly in August. Evidence from the use of playback (recorded birdsong) suggests that flocks are territorial.

== Status ==
The bare-headed laughingthrush is classified as being of least concern by the International Union for Conservation of Nature due to a sufficiently large range and population and a lack of significant population decline. However, it is locally common to uncommon and its population is currently thought to be decreasing. It is threatened by habitat destruction and fragmentation, but its mountainous habitat may give it some level of protection. Although it has not been recorded being sold in markets, it may also be threatened by hunting for the cage-bird trade, which is known to affect other species of laughingthrushes in Indonesia.
