= Chestnut-backed scimitar babbler =

Chestnut-backed scimitar babbler has been split into the following species:

- Javan scimitar babbler, Pomatorhinus montanus
- Sunda scimitar babbler, Pomatorhinus bornensis
