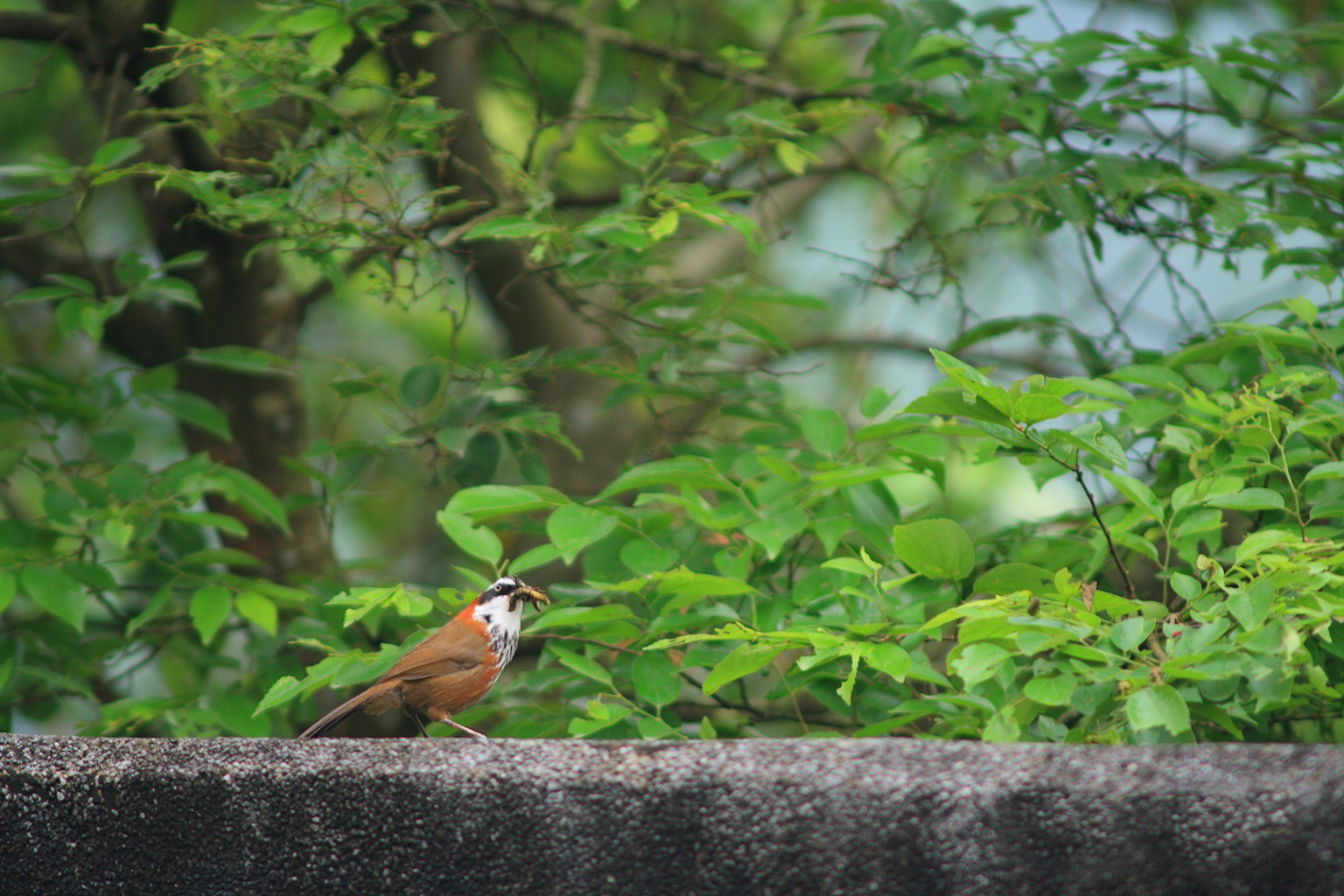
- Taiwan scimitar babbler Pomatorhinus musicus

Scientific classification
- Kingdom: Animalia
- Phylum: Chordata
- Class: Aves
- Order: Passeriformes
- Superfamily: Sylvioidea
- Family: Timaliidae

Groups included
- Pomatorhinus; Napothera

= Scimitar babbler =

Group of tropical birds

The scimitar babblers are birds in the genera Pomatorhinus and Jabouilleia of the large Old World babbler family of passerines. These are birds of tropical Asia, with the greatest number of species occurring in hills of the Himalayas.

Scimitar babblers are rangy, medium-sized, floppy-tailed land birds with soft fluffy plumage. They have strong legs and are quite terrestrial. This group is not strongly migratory, and most species have short rounded wings, and a weak flight.

Scimitar babblers have long, downward-curved bills, used to work through the leaf litter, which give the group its name. They are typically long tailed, dark brown above, and white or orange-brown below. Many have striking head patterns, with a broad black band through the eye, bordered with white above and below.

Most scimitar babblers are jungle species, difficult to observe in the dense vegetation they prefer, but like other babblers, these are noisy birds, and the characteristic bubbling calls are often the best indication that these birds are present.

As with other babbler species, they frequently occur in groups of up to a dozen, and the rain forest species like Indian scimitar babbler often occur in the mixed feeding flocks typical of tropical Asian jungle.

The genera are:

- Pomatorhinus – 15 species
- Napothera – 2 species
