= Micromacronus =

Scientific classification
- Kingdom: Animalia
- Phylum: Chordata
- Class: Aves
- Order: Passeriformes
- Family: Cisticolidae
- Genus: Micromacronus; Amadon, 1962

Type species
- Micromacronus leytensis Amadon, 1962

Species
- Micromacronus leytensis Micromacronus sordidus

Genus of birds

Micromacronus is a bird genus in the family Cisticolidae endemic to the Philippines. Long considered to be monotypic, its members are known as miniature babblers or miniature tit-babblers. As the scientific as well as the common names indicate, their habitus resembles a diminutive version of the tit-babblers (Macronus). The genus was only described in 1962, upon the description of the first species, which had been collected by collector Manuel Celestino and Godofredo Alcasid, a zoologist at the Philippine National Museum. The genus was formerly placed in the family Timaliidae but a molecular phylogenetic study published in 2012 found that the genus was more closely related to species in the family Cisticolidae.

The genus contains just two species; the Visayan miniature babbler, Micromacronus leytensis, and the Mindanao miniature babbler, Micromacronus sordidus. The two species in the genus have sometimes been treated as a single species. The Visayan miniature babbler is found on the islands of Samar, Leyte and Biliran in the central Philippines, whereas the Mindanao miniature babbler is restricted to Mindanao only.
