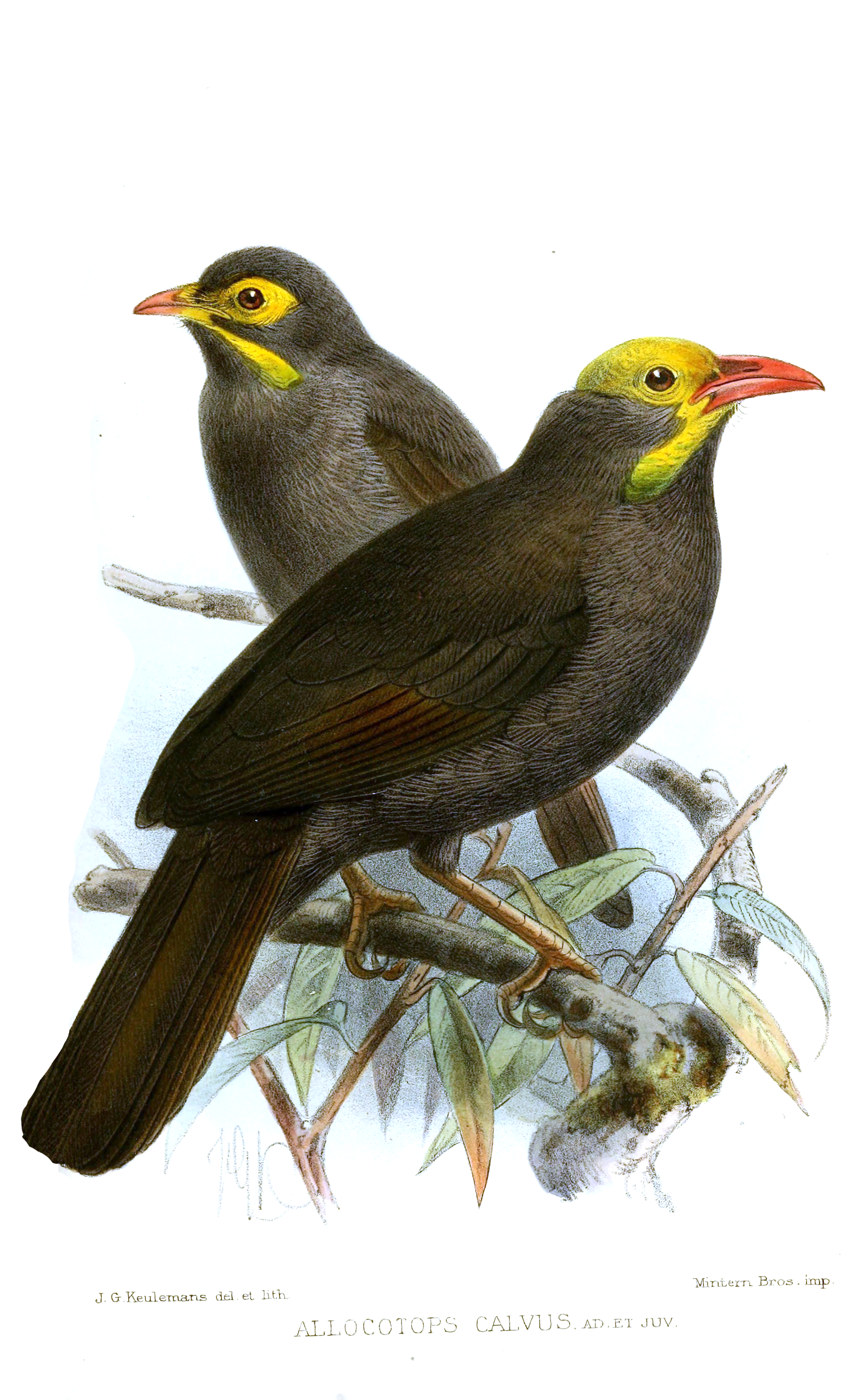

Scientific classification
- Kingdom: Animalia
- Phylum: Chordata
- Class: Aves
- Order: Passeriformes
- Family: Timaliidae
- Genus: Melanocichla; Sharpe, 1883

Type species
- Timalia lugubris (black laughingthrush) S. Müller, 1835

Species
- see text

= Melanocichla =

Genus of birds

Melanocichla is a genus of birds in the Old World babbler family Timaliidae.

== Taxonomy ==
The genus Melanocichla was introduced in 1883 by the English ornithologist Richard Bowdler Sharpe to accommodate a single species, the black laughingthrush, which is therefore the type species of the genus. The name combines the Ancient Greek melas meaning "black" with kikhlē meaning "thrush".

A 2019 molecular phylogenetic study found that the genus Melanocichla was sister to the genus Pomatorhinus containing the scimitar babblers.

== Species ==
The genus contains the following two species:

Image	Common name	Scientific name	Distribution
	Black laughingthrush	Melanocichla lugubris	extreme south Thailand, Malaysia and Sumatra
	Bare-headed laughingthrush	Melanocichla calva	Borneo
