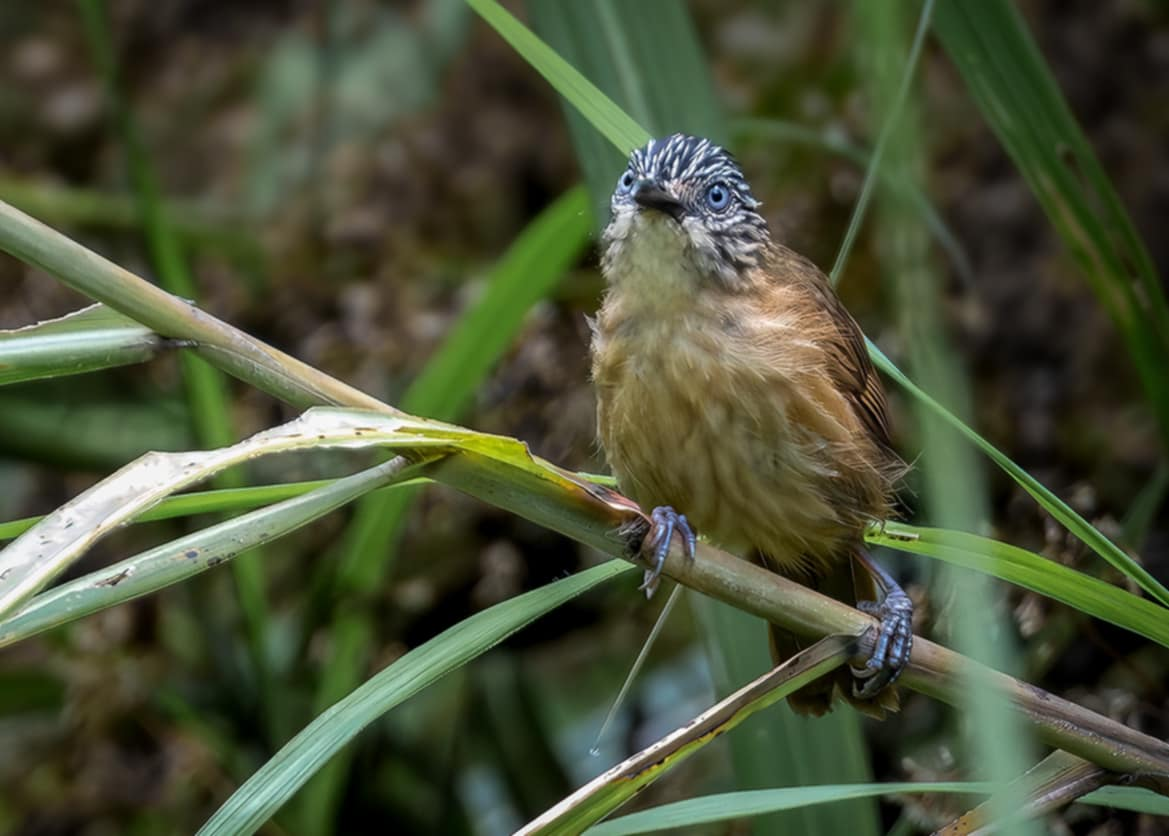

Conservation status
- Least Concern (IUCN 3.1)

Scientific classification
- Kingdom: Animalia
- Phylum: Chordata
- Class: Aves
- Order: Passeriformes
- Family: Timaliidae
- Genus: Macronus
- Species: M. striaticeps

Binomial name
- Macronus striaticeps Sharpe, 1877

= Brown tit-babbler =

Species of bird

The brown tit-babbler (Macronus striaticeps) is a species of bird in the family Timaliidae. It is endemic to the Philippines. Its natural habitats are tropical moist lowland forest and or tropical moist montane forest.

== Description and taxonomy ==
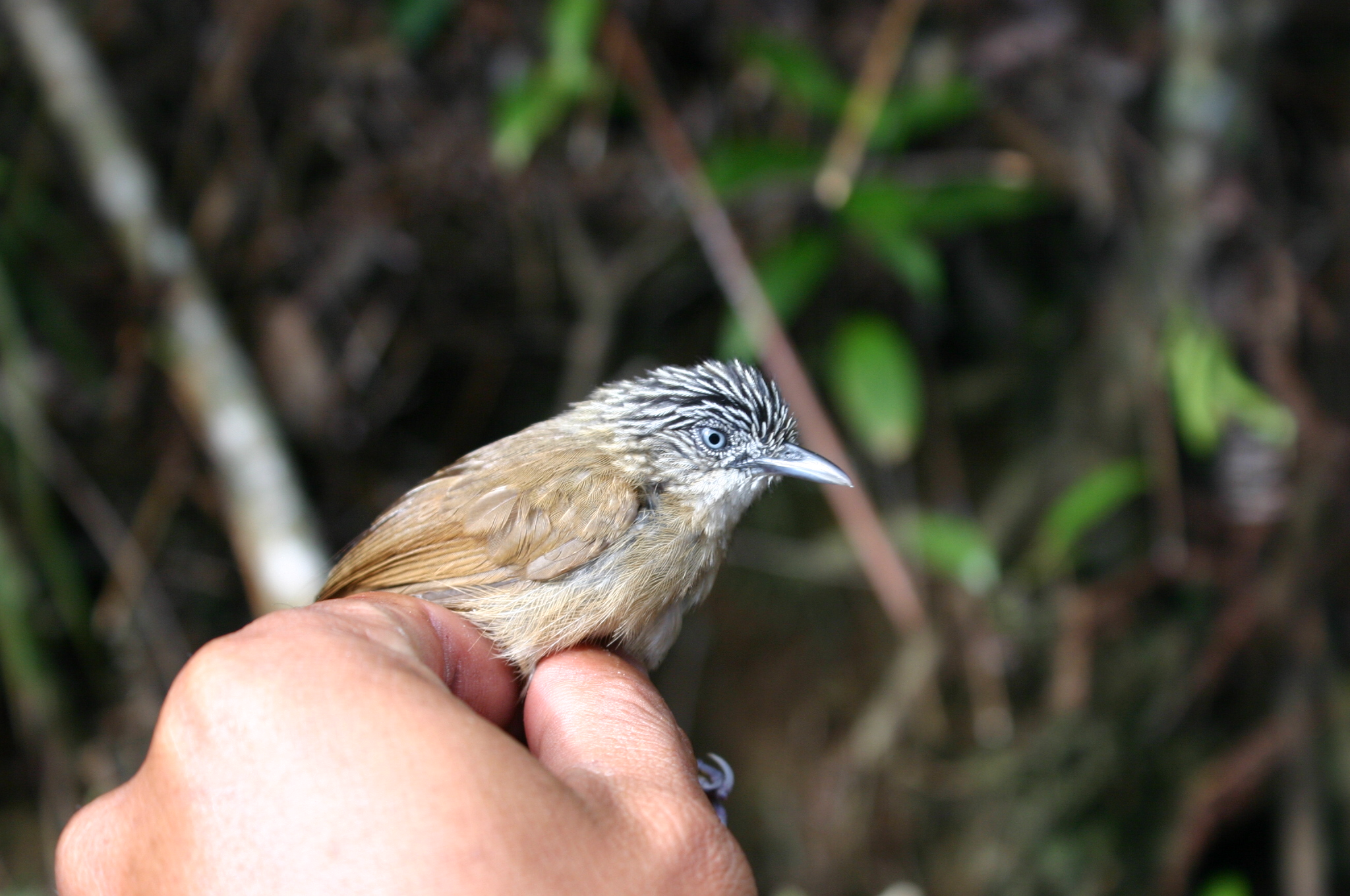

=== Subspecies ===
Four subspecies are recognized:

- M. s. striaceps – Found on Basilan
- M. s. alcasidi – Found on Dinagat Islands and Siargao
- M. s. mindanensis – Found on Mindanao (and surrounding islets), Bohol, Biliran, Leyte and Samar
- M. s. kettlewelli – Found the Sulu Archipelago; most distinctive subspecies and a possible split. Sulu birds have a brown crown, less streaking, and uniformly buffy underparts.

== Ecology and behavior ==
It is presumed to feed on invertebrates and vegetable matter and found in small parties in the middle and lower storeys in tangled vegetation. Can also form mixed flocks with other species.

Observed breeding from March to July. Nest is described as a large loose ball of grass and leaves placed in a clump of grass or near the ground. Clutch size is typically 2 to 3 creamy white or pure white eggs with reddish brown speckles.

== Habitat and conservation status ==
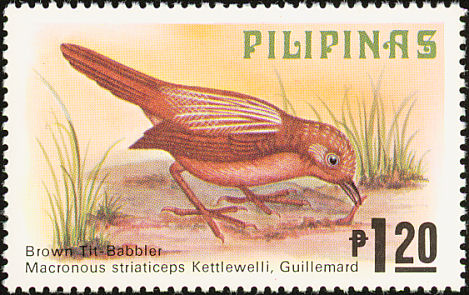
A 1979 Philippine stamp featuring the ssp. kettleweli

It is found in primary and secondary tropical moist lowland forest and scrubland until 1,770 meters above sea level.

IUCN has assessed this bird as least-concern species but the population is decreasing. This species' main threat is habitat loss with wholesale clearance of forest habitats as a result of logging, agricultural conversion and mining activities occurring within the range.

Occurs in a few protected areas like Pasonanca Natural Park, Mount Apo and Mount Kitanglad on Mindanao, Rajah Sikatuna Protected Landscape in Bohol and Samar Island Natural Park but actual protection and enforcement from illegal logging are lax.
