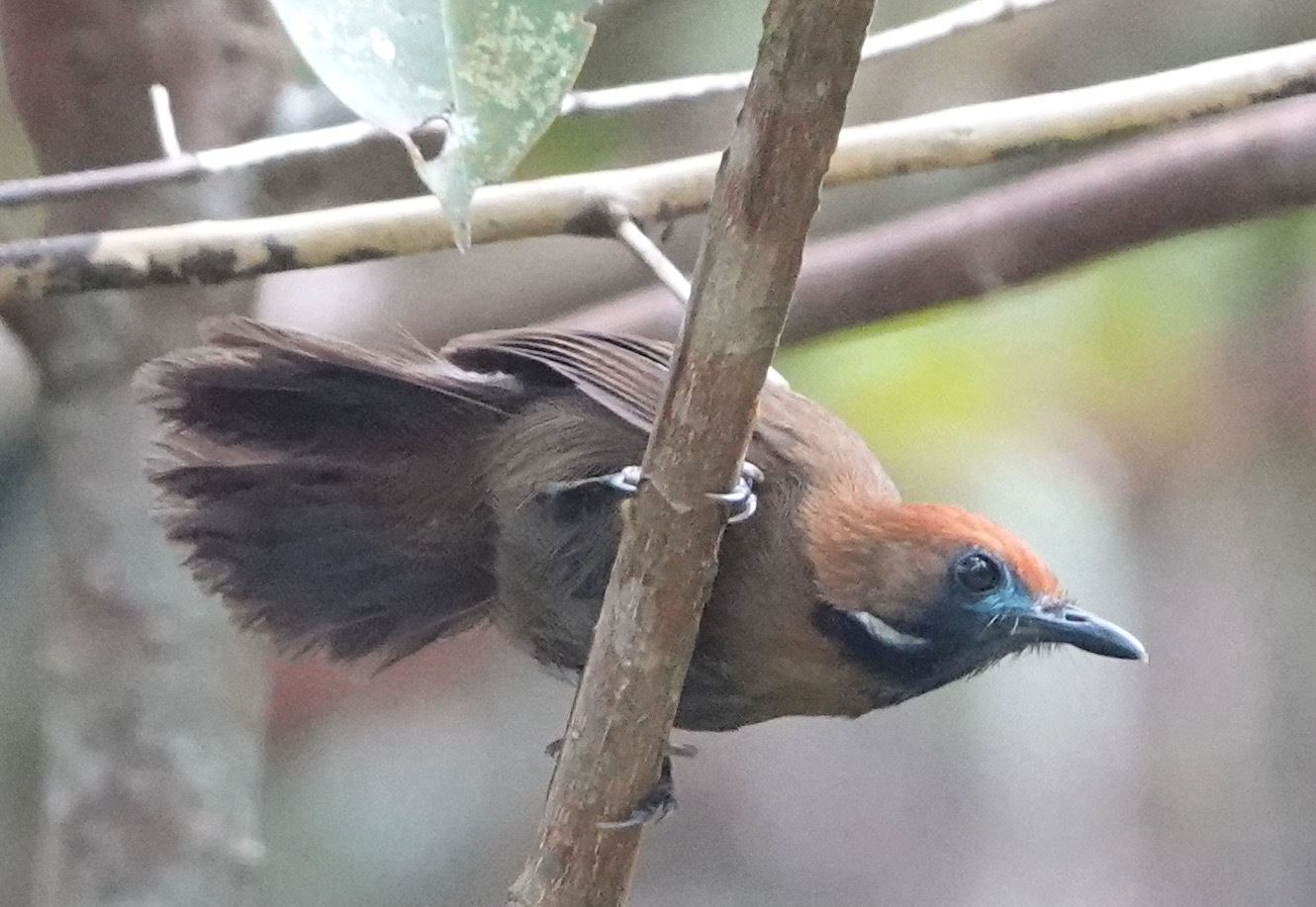
- Macronus ptilosus ptilosus

Conservation status
- Near Threatened (IUCN 3.1)

Scientific classification
- Kingdom: Animalia
- Phylum: Chordata
- Class: Aves
- Order: Passeriformes
- Family: Timaliidae
- Genus: Macronus
- Species: M. ptilosus

Binomial name
- Macronus ptilosus Jardine & Selby, 1835

= Fluffy-backed tit-babbler =

Species of bird

The fluffy-backed tit-babbler (Macronus ptilosus) (Thai: นกกินแมลงหลังฟู) is a species of bird in the family Timaliidae. It is found in Brunei, Indonesia, Malaysia, and Thailand. Its natural habitats are subtropical or tropical moist lowland forest and subtropical or tropical swampland. It is threatened by habitat loss.

There are two subspecies recognized by the International Ornithological Congress:

- M. p. ptilosus (Jardine & Selby, 1835) - Malay Peninsula, Sumatra, Batu Islands
- M. p. trichorrhos (Temminck, 1836) - Bangka Belitung Islands and Borneo
