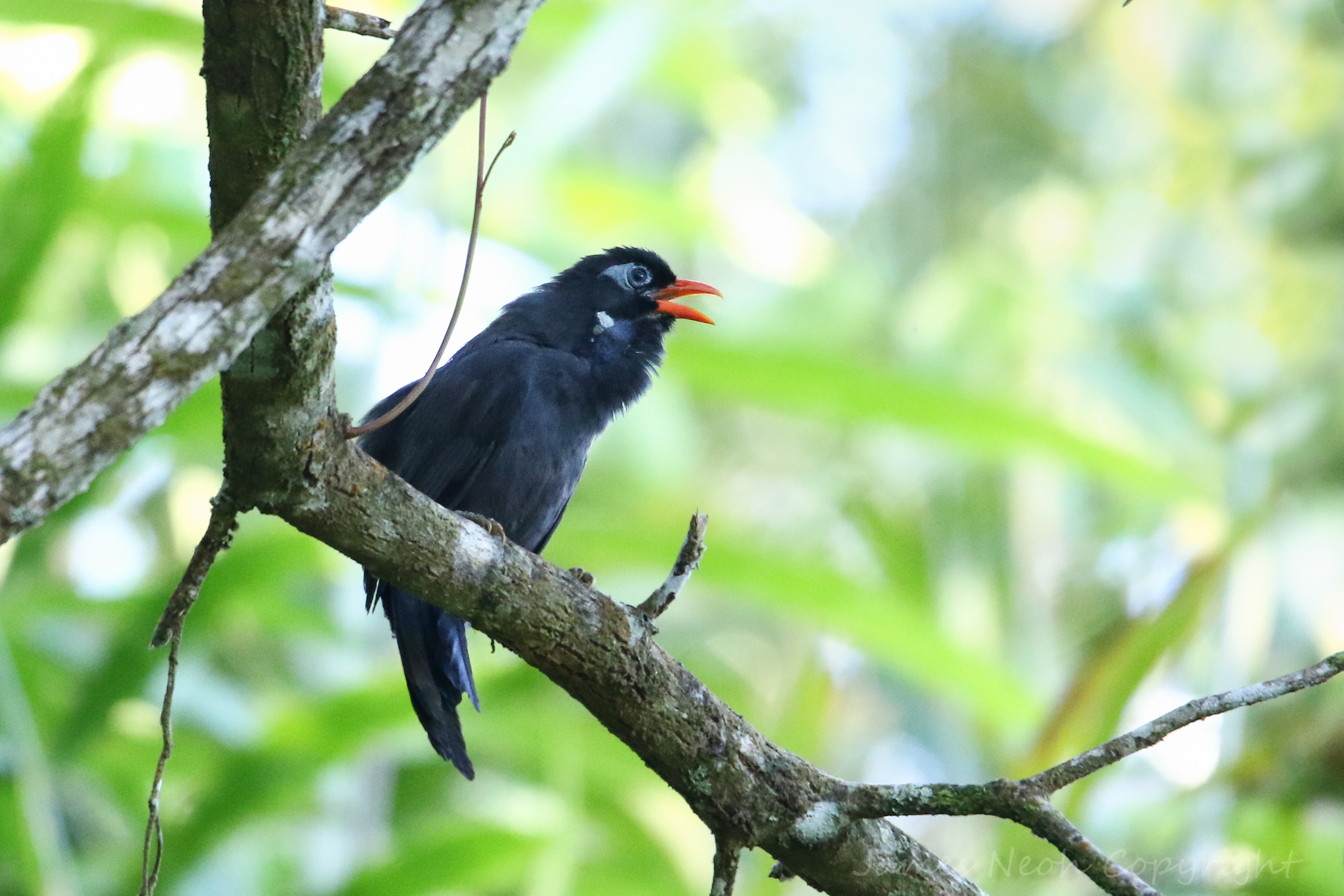

Conservation status
- Least Concern (IUCN 3.1)

Scientific classification
- Kingdom: Animalia
- Phylum: Chordata
- Class: Aves
- Order: Passeriformes
- Family: Timaliidae
- Genus: Melanocichla
- Species: M. lugubris

Binomial name
- Melanocichla lugubris (S. Müller, 1836)

= Black laughingthrush =

Species of bird

The black laughingthrush (Melanocichla lugubris) is a species of bird in the family Timaliidae. It is found in highland forests in the Thai-Malay Peninsula and on the Indonesian island of Sumatra. Until recently, it usually included the bare-headed laughingthrush as a subspecies.

== Gallery ==
Displaying Gap Rest-House, Malaysia, Sept 1997
