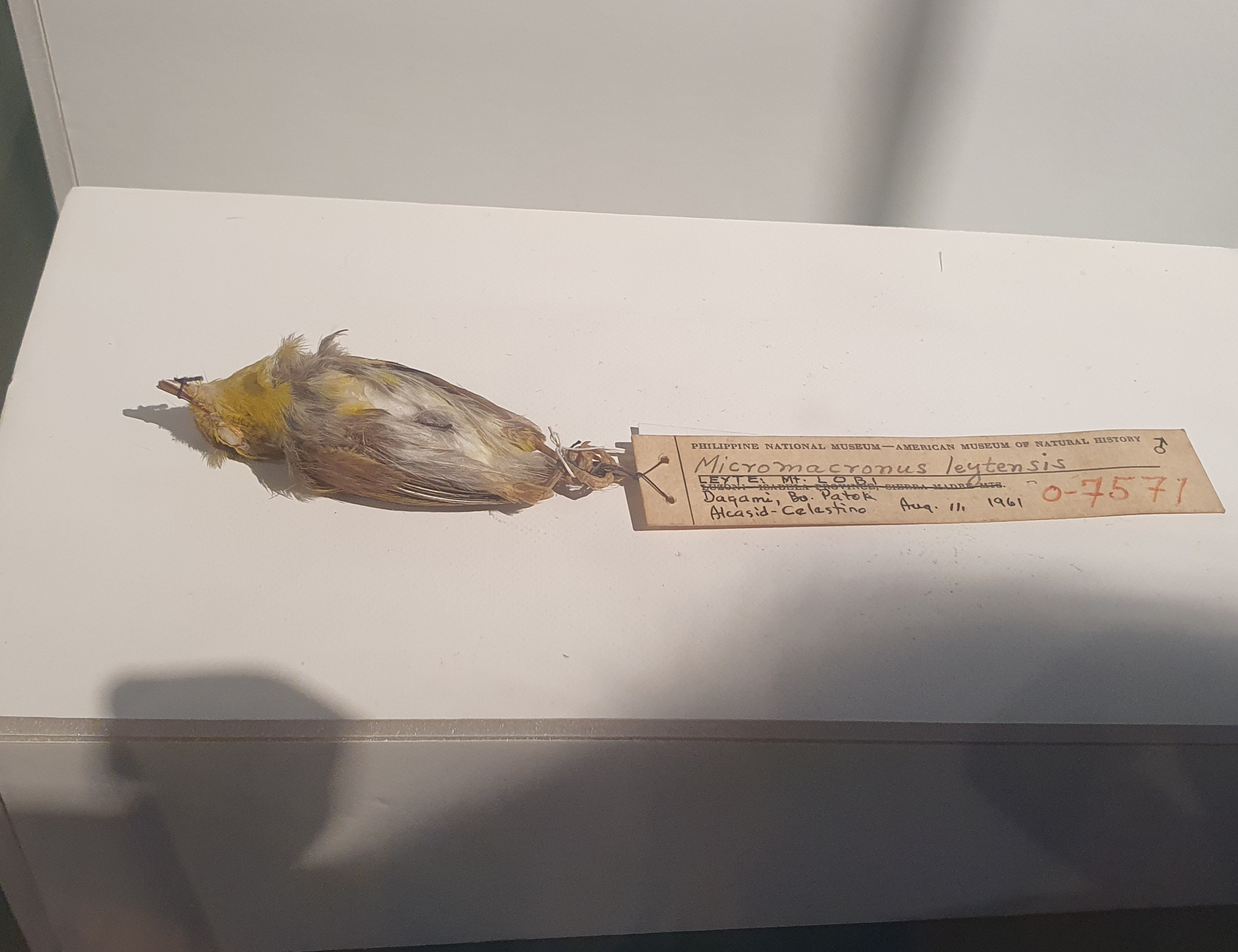
- A stuffed specimen from National Museum of Natural History (Manila)

Conservation status
- Near Threatened (IUCN 3.1)

Scientific classification
- Kingdom: Animalia
- Phylum: Chordata
- Class: Aves
- Order: Passeriformes
- Family: Cisticolidae
- Genus: Micromacronus
- Species: M. leytensis

Binomial name
- Micromacronus leytensis Amadon, 1962

Synonyms
- Micromacronus leytensis leytensis

= Visayan miniature babbler =

Species of bird

The Visayan miniature babbler (Micromacronus leytensis) or the Leyte plumed-warbler is a bird species in the family Cisticolidae.

It is endemic to the Philippines found in the islands of Samar and Leyte. Along with the Mindanao miniature babbler which was previously conspecific with, it is one of the smallest birds in South East Asia at only 7 cm in size. Its natural habitats are tropical moist lowland forest. It is one of the least known birds in the Philippines having only been rediscovered in 2016.

== Description and taxonomy ==
They have been observed to join mixed species flocks of white-eyes and flowerpeckers flying through and middle and high cannopy. Its diet is presumed to be small insects and possibly small fruits. Due to its habits and size, it is believed to be overlooked.

== Habitat and conservation status ==
All recent records of this bird are in Samar Island Natural Park. While this area is listed as a national park, protection is lax and illegal logging and habitat encroachment are still rampant.

Conservation actions proposed include further surveys in suitable habitat especially in Leyte to better understand its range and enforcement of laws on illegal loggers in its habitat.
