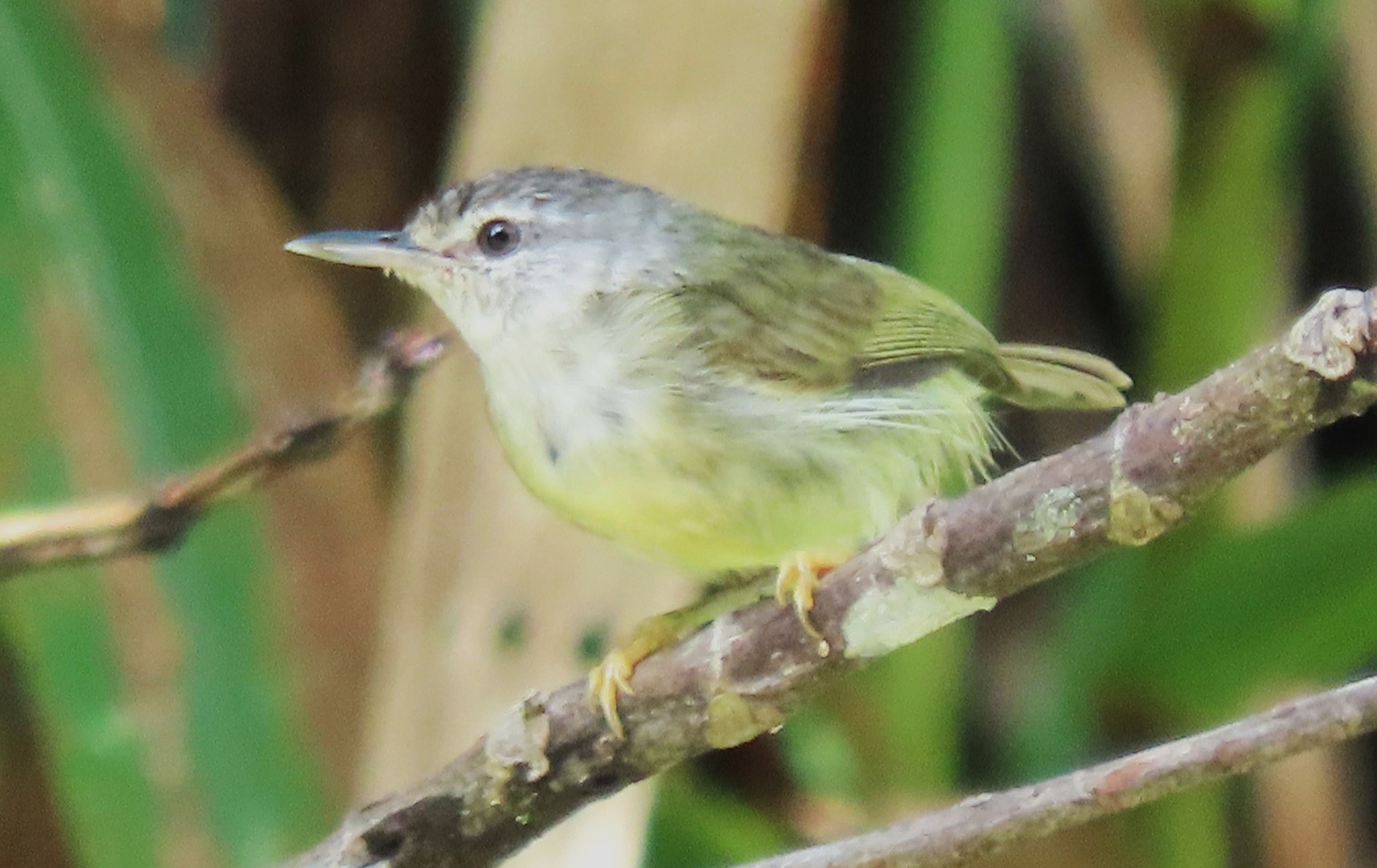

Conservation status
- Near Threatened (IUCN 3.1)

Scientific classification
- Kingdom: Animalia
- Phylum: Chordata
- Class: Aves
- Order: Passeriformes
- Family: Cisticolidae
- Genus: Micromacronus
- Species: M. sordidus

Binomial name
- Micromacronus sordidus Ripley & Rabor, 1968

Synonyms
- Micromacronus leytensis sordidus

= Mindanao miniature babbler =

Species of bird

The Mindanao miniature babbler (Micromacronus sordidus) also known as the Mindanao plumed-warbler is a bird species in the family Cisticolidae. It was formerly conspecific with the Visayan miniature babbler. This bird is endemic to the Philippines found only on the island of Mindanao. Its natural habitats are tropical moist lowland forests and tropical moist montane forests. At just 7 centimeters long and weighing 5 grams, it is one of the smallest birds in Asia.

== Description and taxonomy ==
It was formerly conspecific with the Visayan miniature babbler but is marginally larger and has a more slender pale bill and duller plumage.

They have been observed to join mixed species flocks of white-eyes and flowerpeckers flying through and middle and high canopy. Its diet is presumed to be small insects and possibly small fruits. Due to its habits and size, it is believed to be overlooked.

== Habitat and conservation status ==
The species inhabits lower montane from 600 masl and mid montane forest up to 1,670 masl .

The IUCN has classified the species as s near threatened with the population continuing to decline. It is still affected by habitat loss through illegal logging, mining, land conversion and slash-and-burn but the upper reaches of its habitat are better shielded from deforestation compared to lowland forest. Its population is estimated to be 10,000 to 19,999 mature individuals. While it appears to be rare, its small size and canopy foraging habits, it is possibly overlooked and more common than expected so it is recommended that more targeted searches be done to better estimate the population.

It occurs in some protected areas like Pasonanca Natural Park, Mount Kitanglad and Mount Apo and while these areas are protected on paper encroachment and deforestation continues to occur.
