= Coral-billed scimitar babbler =

Coral-billed scimitar babbler has been split into two species:

- Black-crowned scimitar babbler, Pomatorhinus ferruginosus
- Brown-crowned scimitar babbler, Pomatorhinus phayrei
