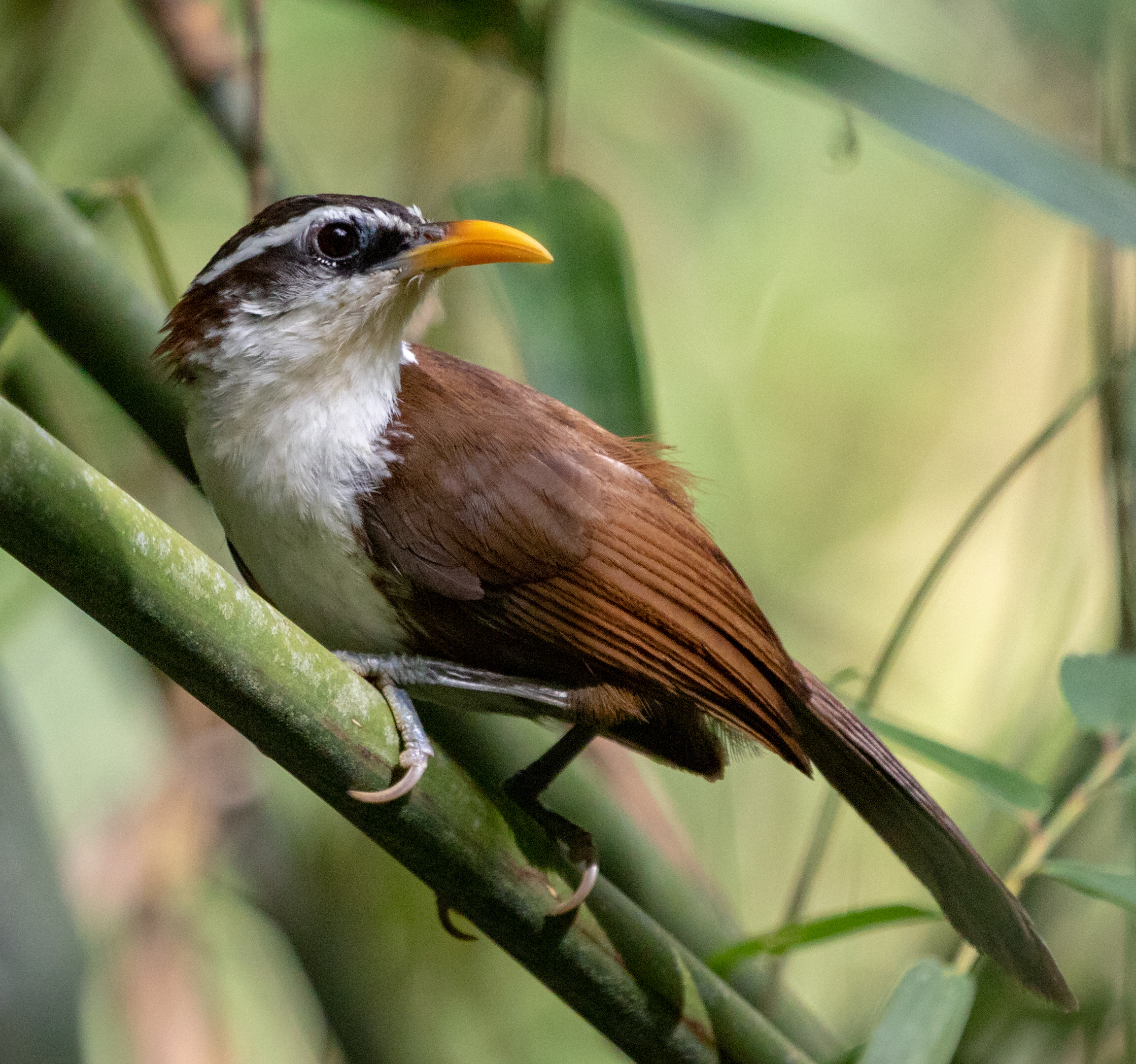

Conservation status
- Least Concern (IUCN 3.1)

Scientific classification
- Kingdom: Animalia
- Phylum: Chordata
- Class: Aves
- Order: Passeriformes
- Family: Timaliidae
- Genus: Pomatorhinus
- Species: P. melanurus

Binomial name
- Pomatorhinus melanurus Blyth, 1847

= Sri Lanka scimitar babbler =

Species of bird

The Sri Lanka scimitar babbler or Ceylon scimitar babbler (Pomatorhinus melanurus) is an Old World babbler. It is endemic to the island of Sri Lanka and was formerly treated as a subspecies of Indian scimitar babbler. The nominate form is found in the western part of wet hill regions of Sri Lanka, while race holdsworthi is found in the dry lowlands and eastern hills.

== In culture ==
Most scimitar babbler species are referred as parandel kurulla by the Sinhala-speaking community. The term 'parandel' refers to dried grass and probably refers to the color of the bird. The vernacular name of the bird parandel kurulla roughly translates to English as 'dried-grass-colored bird'. This bird appears in a 4.50 rupee Sri Lankan postal stamp.

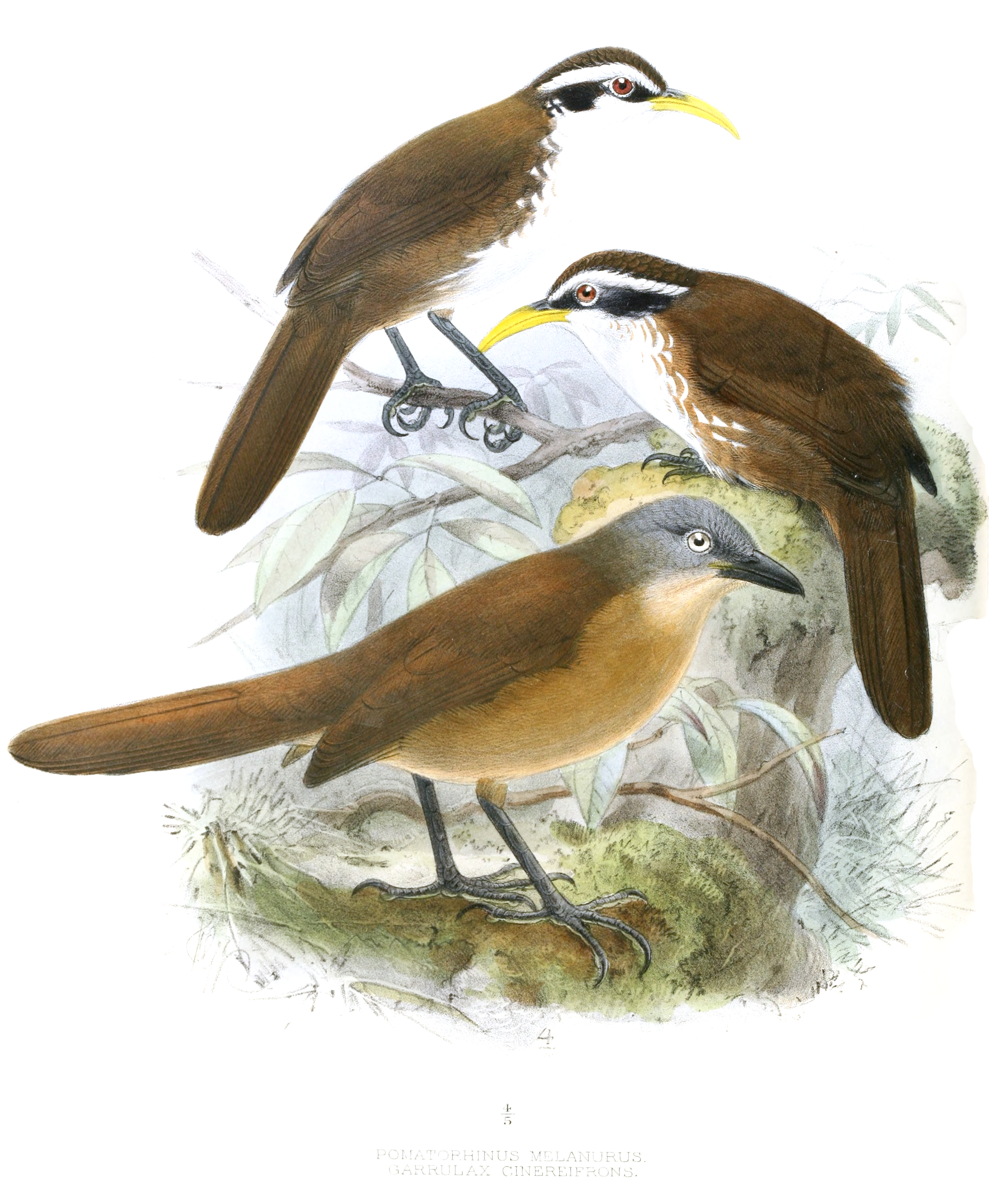
Two birds (above) with an ashy-headed laughingthrush
