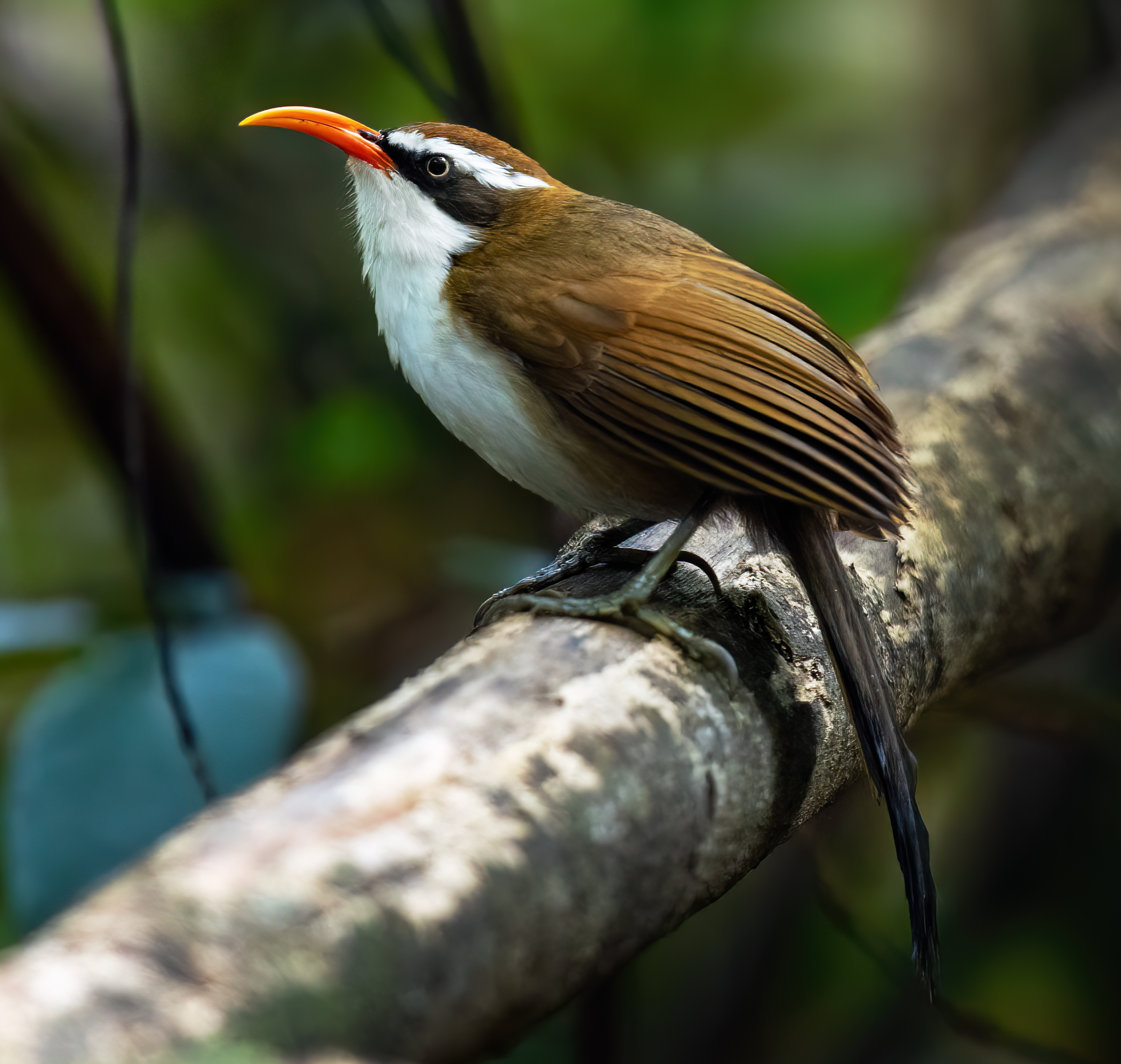

Conservation status
- Least Concern (IUCN 3.1)

Scientific classification
- Kingdom: Animalia
- Phylum: Chordata
- Class: Aves
- Order: Passeriformes
- Family: Timaliidae
- Genus: Pomatorhinus
- Species: P. ochraceiceps

Binomial name
- Pomatorhinus ochraceiceps Walden, 1873

= Red-billed scimitar babbler =

Species of bird

The red-billed scimitar-babbler (Pomatorhinus ochraceiceps) is a species of bird in the family Timaliidae. It is found in Northeast India, Southeast Asia and adjacent parts of southern China. It has a long reddish-orange decurved bill that is typical of scimitar-babblers, a rather long white supercilium, and brown upperparts and tail. Sexes are similar.

It is typically found between 300-2400m across its range and its natural habitats are subtropical or tropical moist lowland forest and subtropical or tropical moist montane forest, particularly favouring bamboo clumps and Fokienia-dominated forest. It feeds mainly on invertebrates but is also known to take nectar from flowers. It is a frequent participant of mixed-species bird flocks, often associating with the white-hooded babbler.
