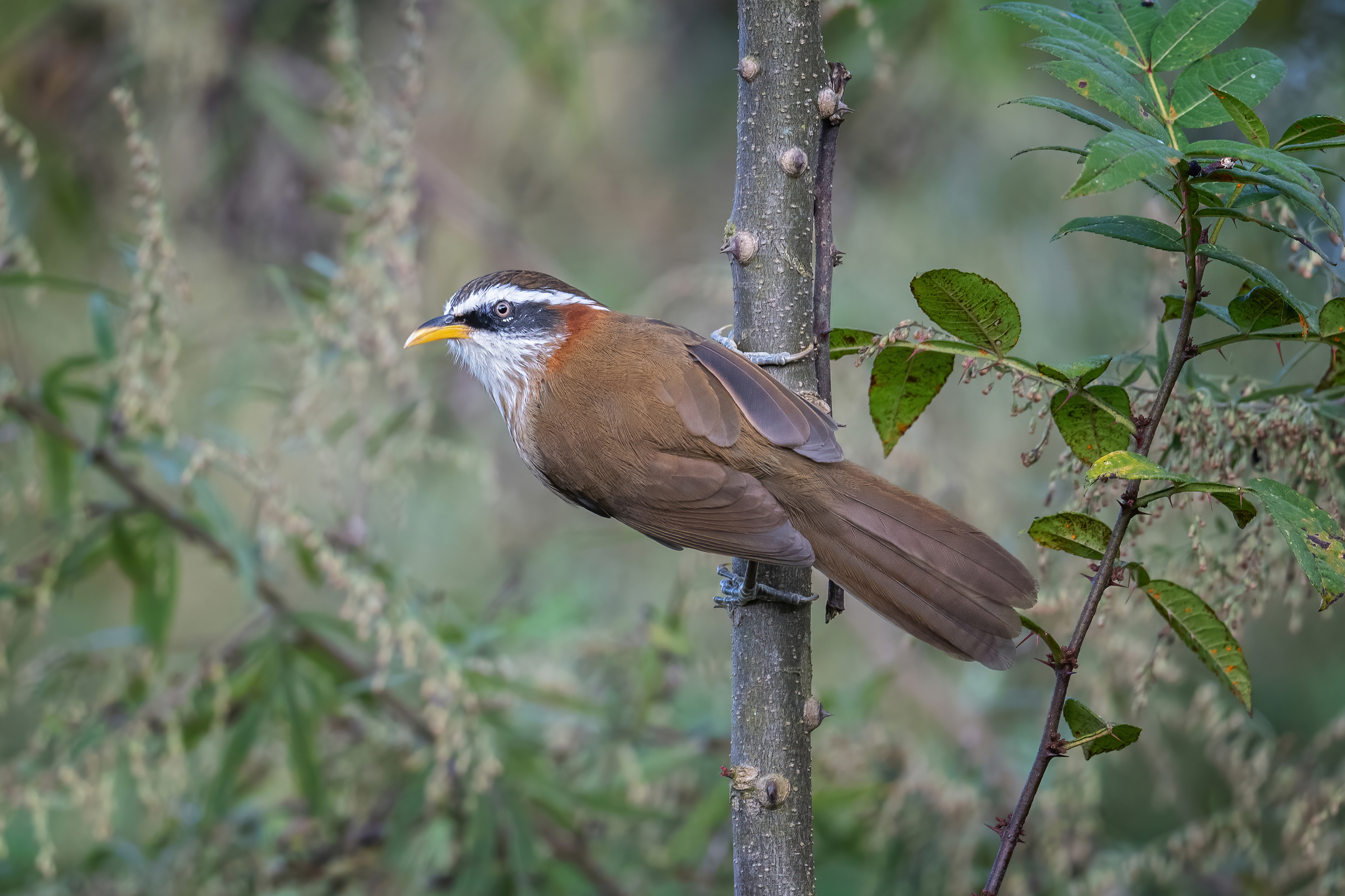
- in Nagarkot, Nepal

Conservation status
- Least Concern (IUCN 3.1)

Scientific classification
- Kingdom: Animalia
- Phylum: Chordata
- Class: Aves
- Order: Passeriformes
- Family: Timaliidae
- Genus: Pomatorhinus
- Species: P. ruficollis

Binomial name
- Pomatorhinus ruficollis Hodgson, 1836

= Streak-breasted scimitar babbler =

Species of bird

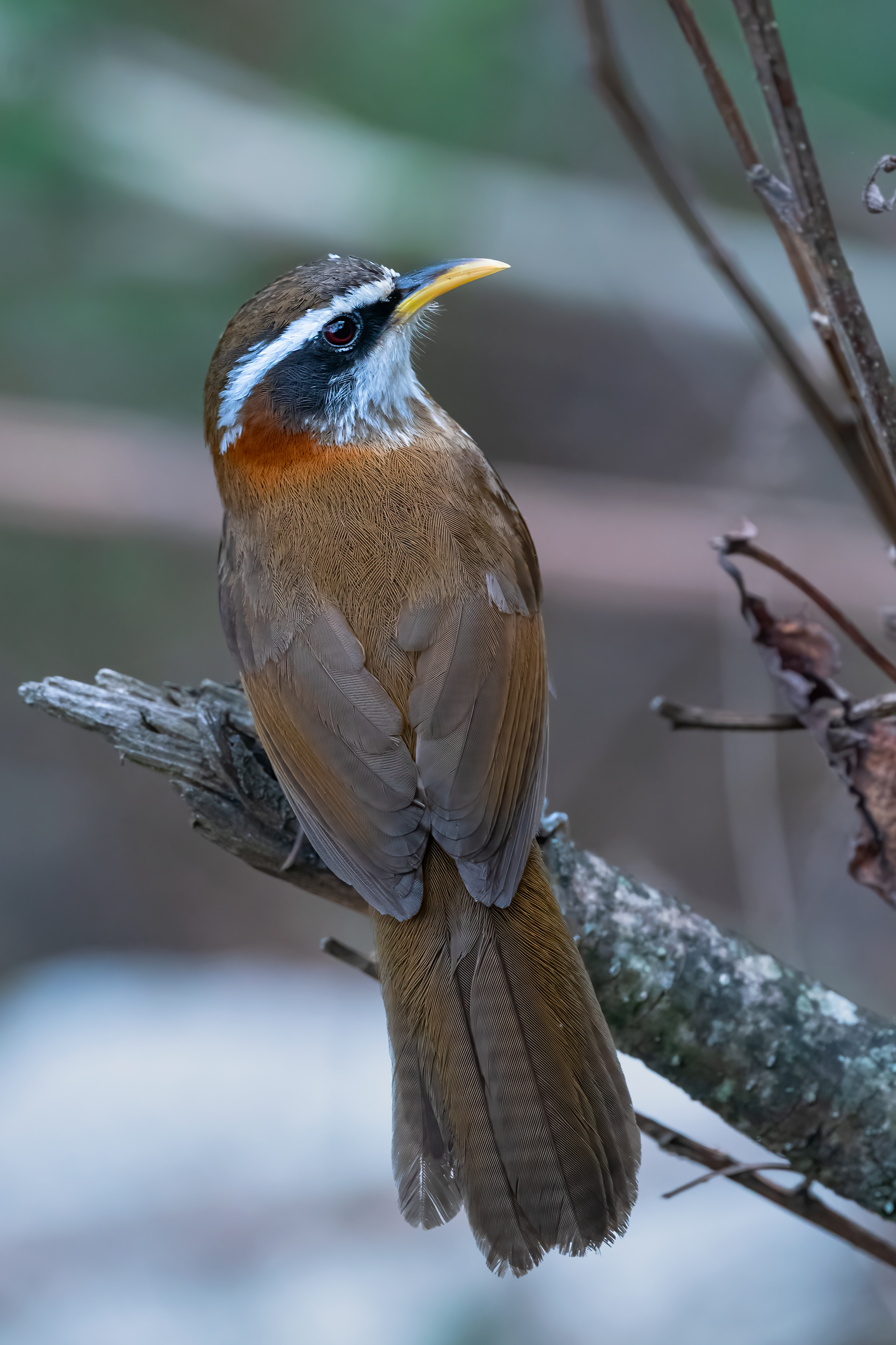
Streak-breasted Scimitar-Babbler, in Baisakhi, Arunachal Pradesh

The streak-breasted scimitar babbler (Pomatorhinus ruficollis) is a species of bird in the family Timaliidae.

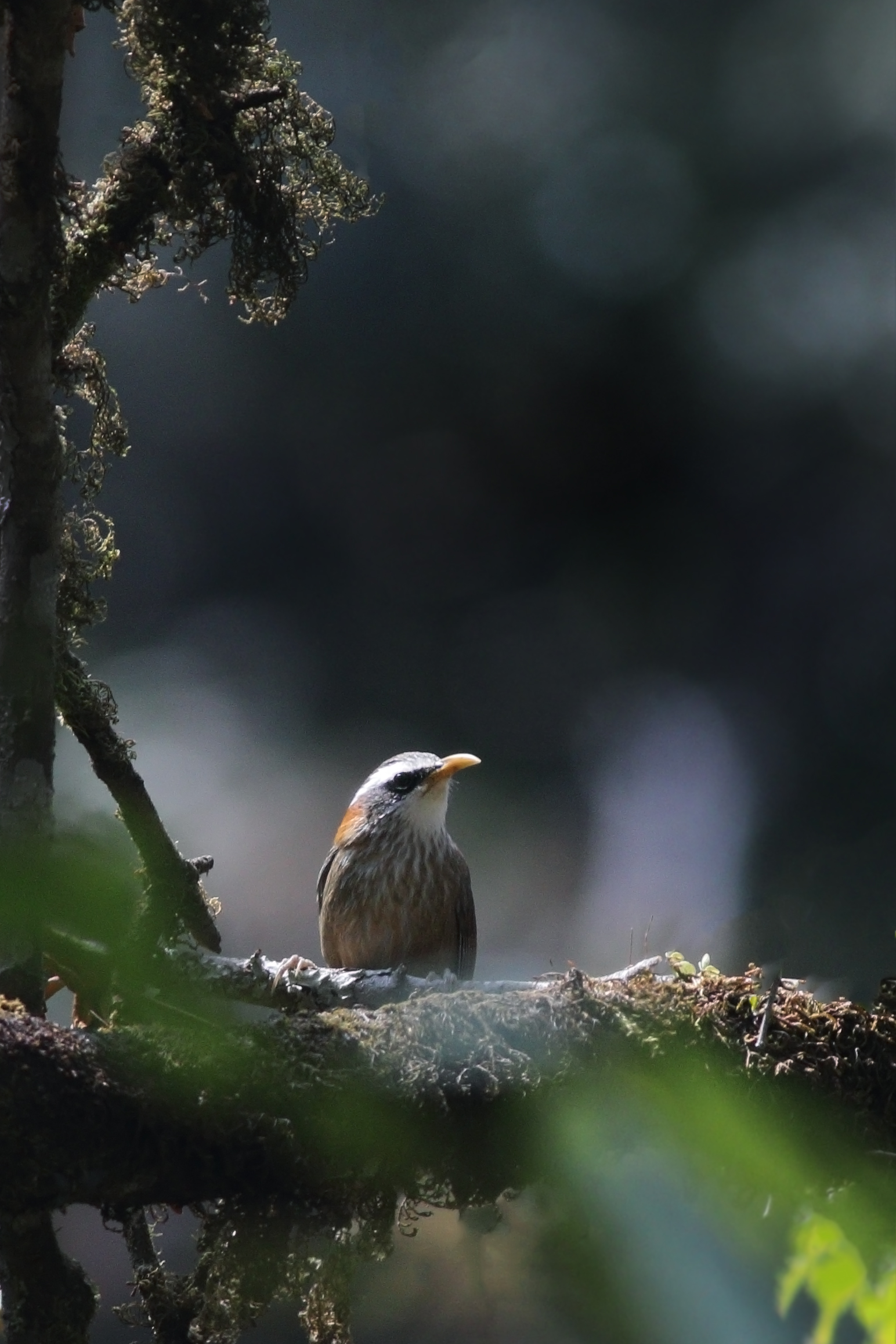
From Khonoma Nature Conservation and Tragopan Sanctuary, Nagaland, India.

It is found in Bangladesh, Bhutan, China, India, Laos, Myanmar, Nepal, and Vietnam. Its natural habitat is subtropical or tropical moist montane forest. The former Taiwan subspecies musicus is usually now considered a distinct species as the Taiwan scimitar babbler.

It forms mixed flocks with other species.
