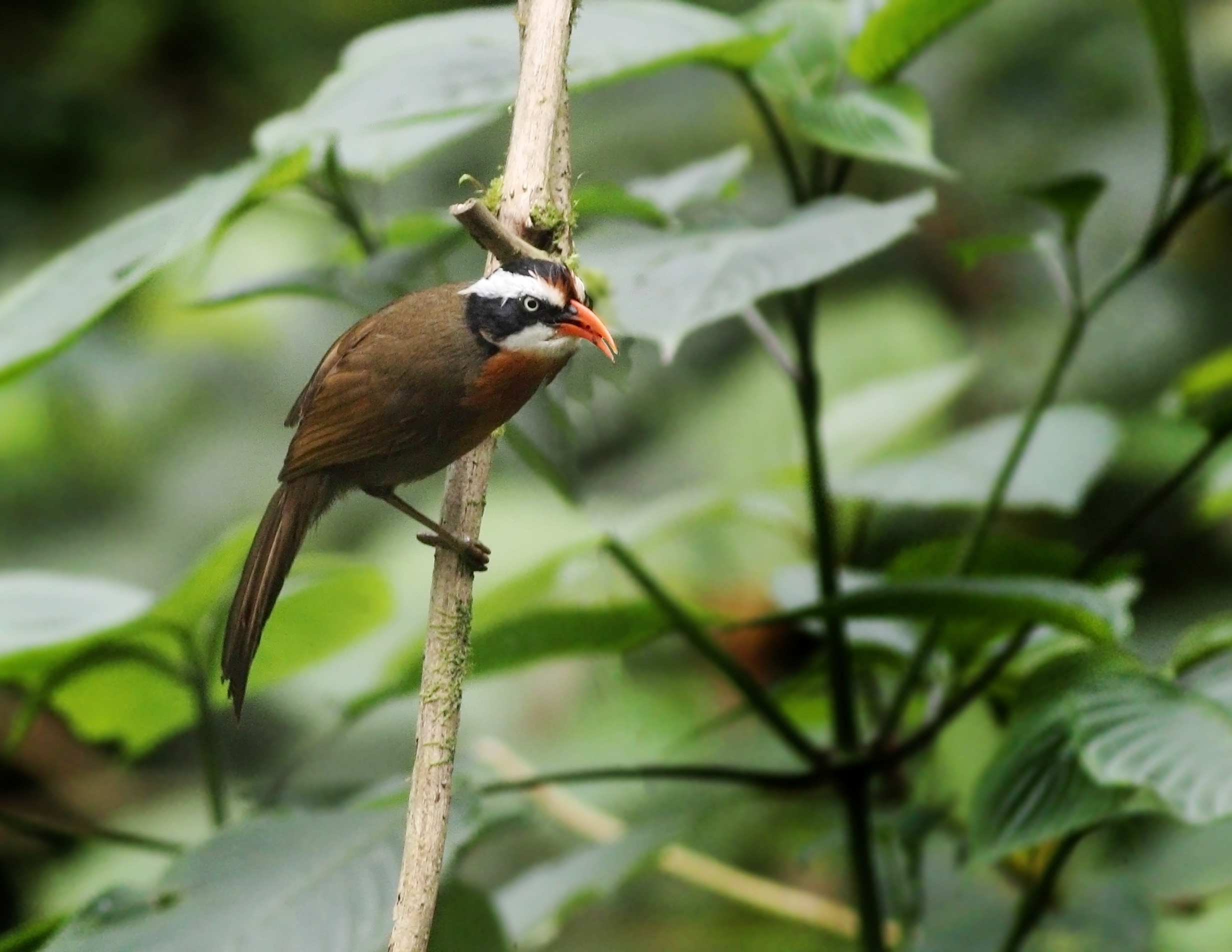
- From Eaglenest Wildlife Sanctuary, Arunachal Pradesh, India.

Conservation status
- Least Concern (IUCN 3.1)

Scientific classification
- Kingdom: Animalia
- Phylum: Chordata
- Class: Aves
- Order: Passeriformes
- Family: Timaliidae
- Genus: Pomatorhinus
- Species: P. ferruginosus

Binomial name
- Pomatorhinus ferruginosus Blyth, 1845

= Black-crowned scimitar babbler =

Species of bird

The black-crowned scimitar babbler (Pomatorhinus ferruginosus) is a species of bird in the family Timaliidae.

It is found in Bhutan, India, Nepal, and China. Its natural habitat is subtropical moist montane forest. It is normally 24 cm long and weighs 40-48g.
