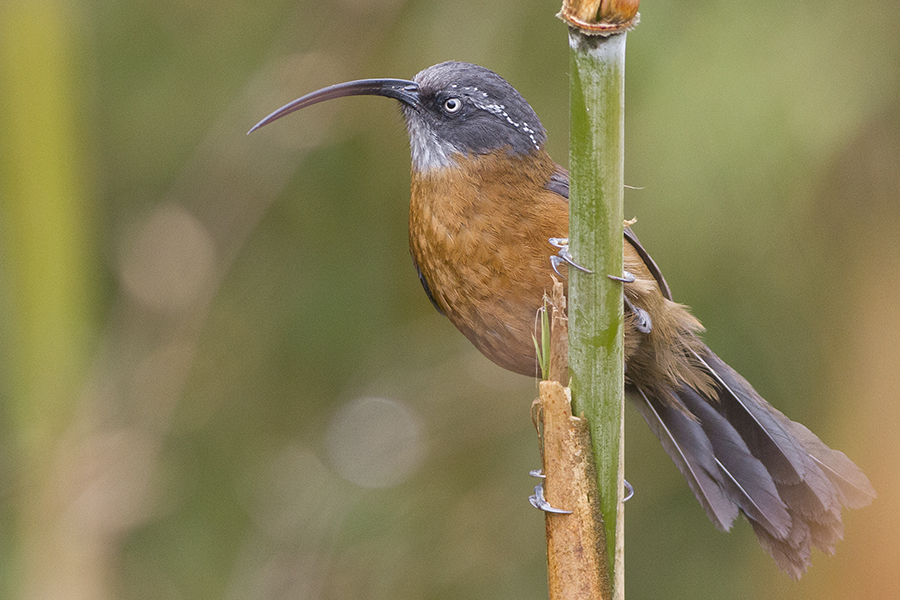

Conservation status
- Least Concern (IUCN 3.1)

Scientific classification
- Kingdom: Animalia
- Phylum: Chordata
- Class: Aves
- Order: Passeriformes
- Family: Timaliidae
- Genus: Pomatorhinus
- Species: P. superciliaris

Binomial name
- Pomatorhinus superciliaris (Blyth, 1842)

Synonyms
- Xiphirhynchus superciliaris

= Slender-billed scimitar babbler =

Species of bird

The slender-billed scimitar babbler (Pomatorhinus superciliaris) is a passerine bird in the Old World babbler family. It is found from the Himalayas to north-western Vietnam. Its natural habitat is subtropical or tropical moist montane forests.

The slender-billed scimitar babbler was formerly placed in the monotypic genus Xiphirhynchus. It was moved to Pomatorhinus based on the results of a molecular phylogenetic study of the babblers published in 2009 that showed that it nested within a clade with other members of Pomatorhinus.
