= Macronus =

Scientific classification
- Kingdom: Animalia
- Phylum: Chordata
- Class: Aves
- Order: Passeriformes
- Family: Timaliidae
- Genus: Macronus; Jardine & Selby, 1835

Type species
- Macronus ptilosus Jardine & Selby, 1835

Genus of birds

Macronus, the tit-babblers, are a genus of passerine birds in the family Timaliidae. This genus's name is frequently misspelled as Macronous.

== Species ==
The genus includes the following two species:

Image	Common name	Scientific name	Distribution
	Brown tit-babbler	Macronus striaticeps	Philippines
	Fluffy-backed tit-babbler	Macronus ptilosus	Brunei, Indonesia, Malaysia, and Thailand
