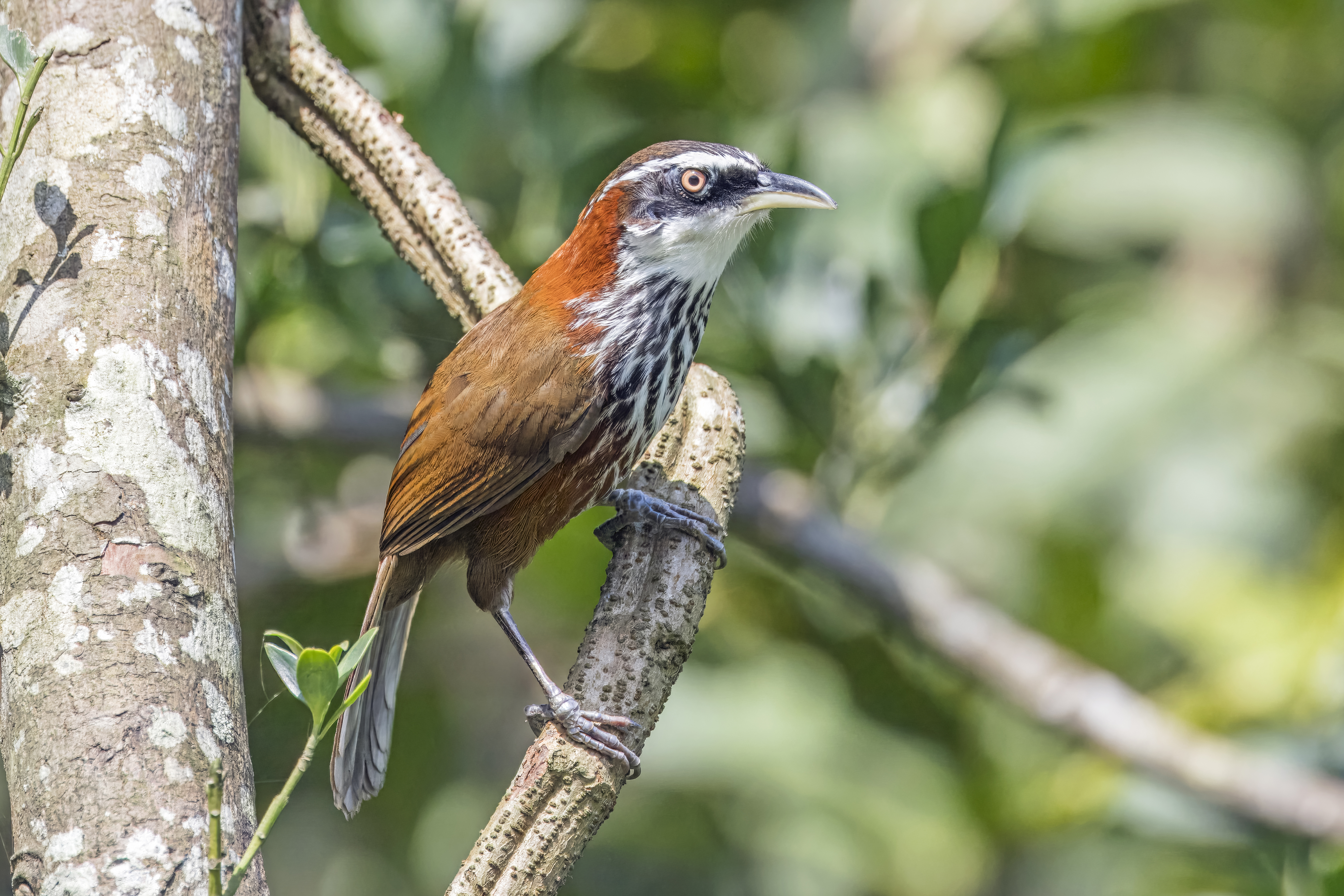
- Taiwan scimitar babbler (Pomatorhinus musicus)

Scientific classification
- Kingdom: Animalia
- Phylum: Chordata
- Class: Aves
- Order: Passeriformes
- Family: Timaliidae
- Genus: Pomatorhinus; Horsfield, 1821

Type species
- Pomatorhinus montanus Horsfield, 1821

Species
- See text

= Pomatorhinus =

Genus of birds

Pomatorhinus is a genus of scimitar babblers, jungle birds with long downcurved bills. These are birds of tropical Asia, with the greatest number of species occurring in hills of the Himalayas.

These are medium-sized, floppy-tailed landbirds with soft plumage. They are typically long-tailed, dark brown above, and white or orange-brown below. Many have striking head patterns, with a broad black band through the eye, bordered with white above and below.

They have strong legs and are quite terrestrial. Like other babblers, these are noisy birds, and the characteristic bubbling calls are often the best indication that these birds are present. As with other babbler species, they frequently occur in groups of up to a dozen, and the rainforest species like the Indian scimitar babbler often occur in the mixed feeding flocks typical of tropical Asian jungle.

== Taxonomy ==
The genus Pomatorhinus was introduced in 1821 by the American naturalist Thomas Horsfield to accommodate a single species, Pomatorhinus montanus Horsfield, the Javan scimitar babbler. This species is the type species of the genus. The genus name combines the Ancient Greek πωμα/pōma, πωματος/pōmatos meaning "lid" or "cover" with ῥις/rhis, ῥινος/rhinos meaning "nostrils".

The genus contains 11 species. The cladogram below showing the relationships within the genus is based on a 2019 molecular phylogenetic study by Tianlong Cai and coworkers:

- - Pomatorhinus
    - - Coral-billed scimitar babbler (Pomatorhinus ferruginosus)
      - Red-billed scimitar babbler (Pomatorhinus ochraceiceps)
    - - Slender-billed scimitar babbler (Pomatorhinus superciliaris)
      - - - Streak-breasted scimitar babbler (Pomatorhinus ruficollis)
          - Taiwan scimitar babbler (Pomatorhinus musicus)
        - - White-browed scimitar babbler (Pomatorhinus schisticeps)
          - - Javan scimitar babbler (Pomatorhinus montanus)
            - - Sri Lanka scimitar babbler (Pomatorhinus melanurus)
              - Indian scimitar babbler (Pomatorhinus horsfieldii)

== Species ==
Image	Common name	Scientific name	Distribution
	Indian scimitar babbler	Pomatorhinus horsfieldii	Peninsular India
	Sri Lanka scimitar babbler	Pomatorhinus melanurus	Sri Lanka
	Sunda scimitar babbler	Pomatorhinus bornensis	Brunei, Indonesia, Malaysia, and Thailand.
	White-browed scimitar babbler	Pomatorhinus schisticeps	Bangladesh, Bhutan, Cambodia, India, Laos, Myanmar, Nepal, Thailand, and Vietnam.
	Javan scimitar babbler	Pomatorhinus montanus	Indonesia
	Streak-breasted scimitar babbler	Pomatorhinus ruficollis	Bangladesh, Bhutan, China, India, Laos, Myanmar, Nepal, and Vietnam.
	Taiwan scimitar babbler	Pomatorhinus musicus	Taiwan
	Red-billed scimitar babbler	Pomatorhinus ochraceiceps	Northeast India, Southeast Asia and adjacent parts of southern China.
	Black-crowned scimitar babbler	Pomatorhinus ferruginosus	Bhutan, India, Nepal, China.
	Brown-crowned scimitar babbler	Pomatorhinus phayrei	Bhutan, India, Myanmar, Thailand, Laos, China.
	Slender-billed scimitar babbler	Pomatorhinus superciliaris	the Himalayas to north-western Vietnam.
