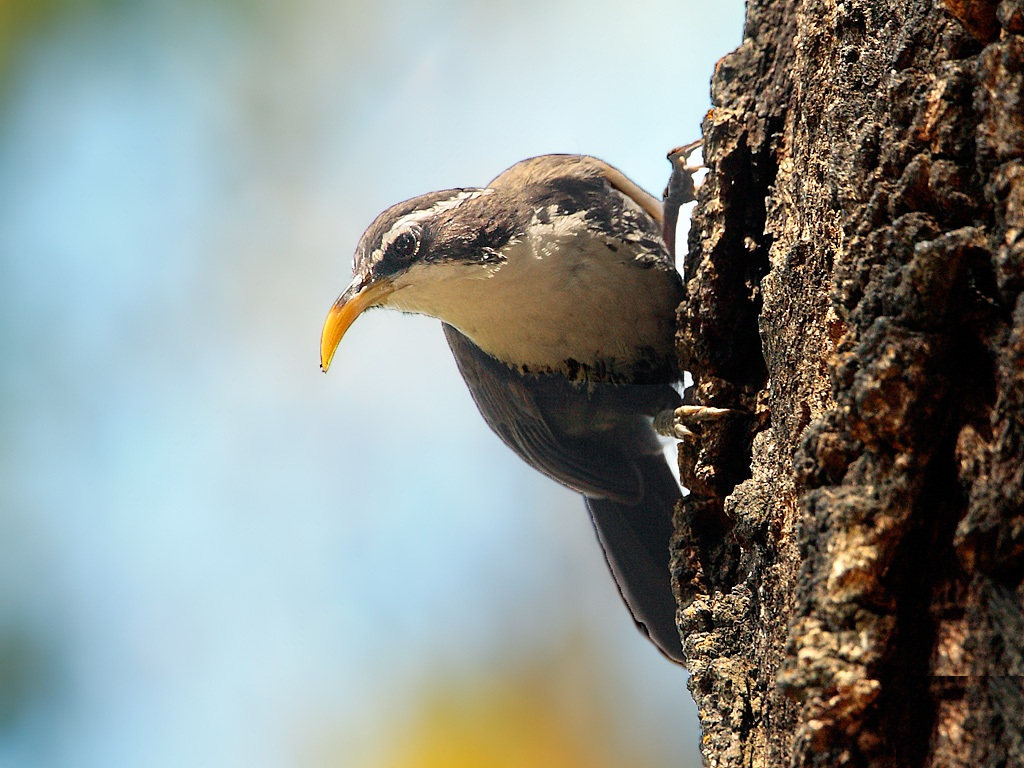

Conservation status
- Least Concern (IUCN 3.1)

Scientific classification
- Kingdom: Animalia
- Phylum: Chordata
- Class: Aves
- Order: Passeriformes
- Family: Timaliidae
- Genus: Pomatorhinus
- Species: P. horsfieldii

Binomial name
- Pomatorhinus horsfieldii Sykes, 1832

Subspecies
- P. h. obscurus Hume, 1872; P. h. horsfieldii Sykes, 1832; P. h. travancoreensis Harington, 1914; P. h. maderaspatensis Whistler, 1936
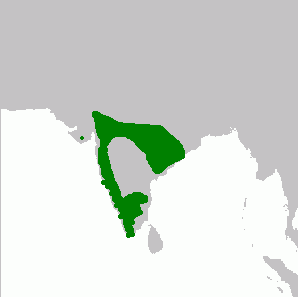

Audio
- Calls

= Indian scimitar babbler =

Species of bird

The Indian scimitar babbler (Pomatorhinus horsfieldii) is an Old World babbler. It is found in peninsular India in a range of forest habitats. They are most often detected by their distinctive calls, which include an antiphonal duet by a pair of birds. They are often hard to see as they forage through dense vegetation. The long, curved yellow, scimitar-shaped bills give them their name. It has been treated in the past as a subspecies of the white-browed scimitar babbler which is found along the Himalayas but now separated into two species, the peninsular Indian species and the Sri Lanka scimitar babbler (Pomatorhinus melanurus).

== Description ==
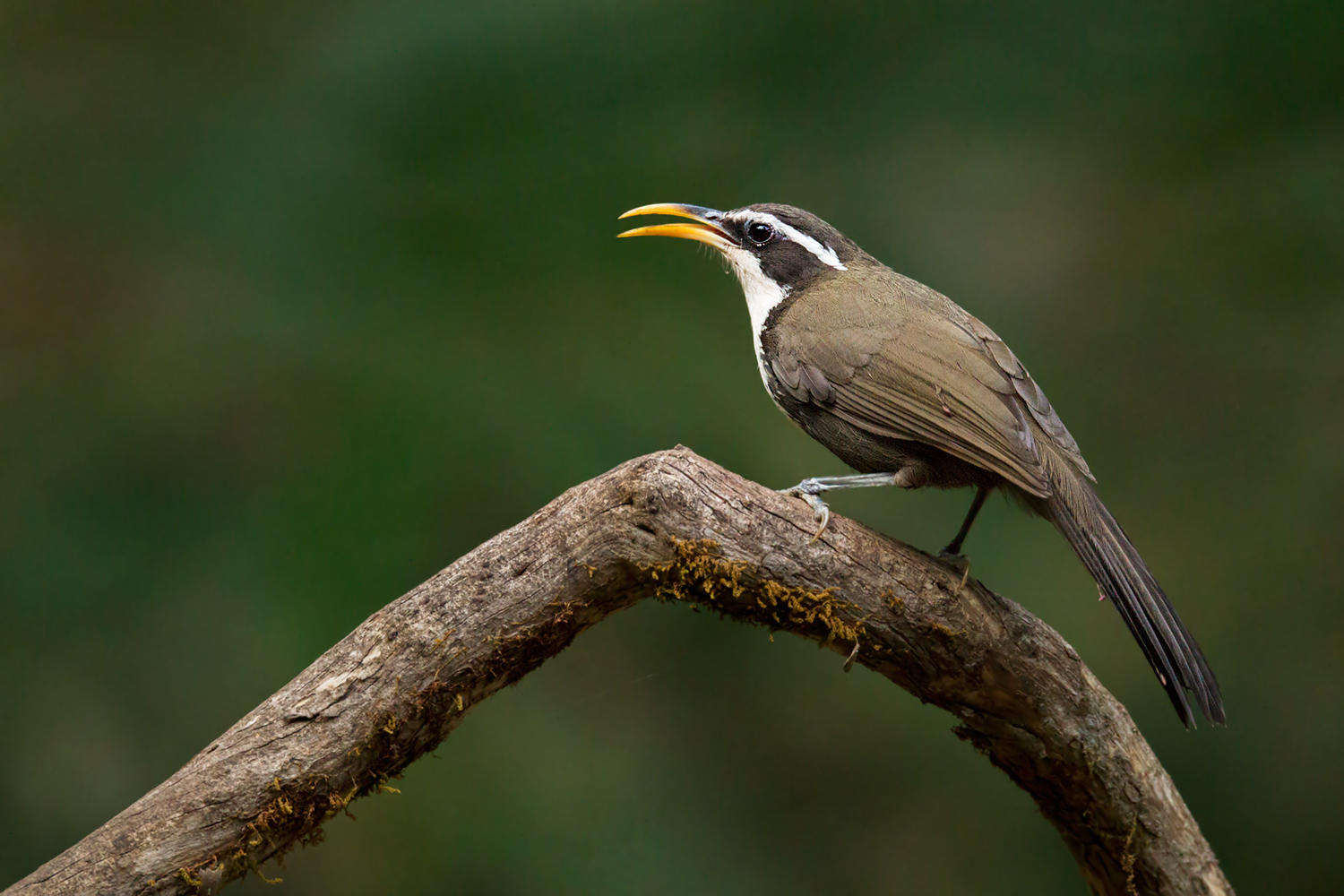
An Indian scimitar babbler at Dandeli tiger reserve, India

The most distinctive feature of this 22 cm long bird is the long down-curved yellow bill which is blackish at the base of the upper mandible. It has a striking head pattern, with a long white supercilium above a broad black band through the eye. The white throat and breast contrast with the dark greyish brown on the upperside and dark grey to black on most of the underside. The tail is broad, long and graduated. They have short, round wings and being weak fliers are rarely seen flying in the open.

Indian scimitar-babblers have long down-curved yellow bills, used to work through the leaf litter and bark in search of their food which is mainly insects and berries. They can be difficult to observe in the dense vegetation they prefer, but like many other babblers, these are noisy birds, and the characteristic bubbling calls are often the best indication that these birds are present. The call itself consists of a loud fluty oop-pu-pu-pu followed immediately by a krukru. The second note is produced by the female and the duet is accurately synchronized. Leucistic plumages have been recorded.

== Distribution ==

It is the only scimitar babbler in Peninsular India. This species is found south of a line between Rajasthan and Orissa.

== Taxonomy and systematics ==
The Old World babblers are a large family of passerine birds characterised by soft fluffy plumage. They are birds of tropical areas, with the greatest variety in southeast Asia. This species is very close to the Sri Lanka scimitar babbler which has in the past been treated as a subspecies. In the past, this species has been considered as a subspecies of the white-browed scimitar babbler (Pomatorhinus schisticeps) which is found along the Himalayan foothills. Molecular studies confirm this relatedness.

There are several races that have been noted, race travancoreensis is found in the Western Ghats south of Goa and is darker (see Gloger's rule). The nominate horsfieldii is found in the plains in the southern part of the peninsula. The race obscurus of the dry zone in the northwest (Madhya Pradesh, Rajasthan and Gujarat; possibly Orissa) is lighter and greyer. Race maderaspatensis of the Eastern Ghats is intermediate in plumage between the nominate form and obscurus. Race maderaspatensis lacks the black base to the upper mandible and the bill is shorter. It has been recorded from the Palkonda Hills, Nallamalai Hills, Kurumbapatti and Shevaroy Hills.

The Sri Lankan form that was considered as a subspecies, melanurus, has been elevated to a full species by some works that note the geographic isolation and distinctive calls. The Sri Lankan form, however, responds to playback of the call of the Indian form.

== Behaviour and ecology ==
The Indian scimitar babbler is a resident breeder (non-migratory) bird. Its habitat is forest and secondary growth mainly in the hilly regions. They feed on insects on the ground or on vegetation. Hopping on the ground, they may turn over leaves or probe in leaf litter for prey. They may sometimes join mixed-species foraging flocks.

They breed from December to May. The nest is a large and loose globular mass of foliage concealed in a bush on the ground or low down. They usually lay three eggs (but varies from two to four) which are pure white in colour.
