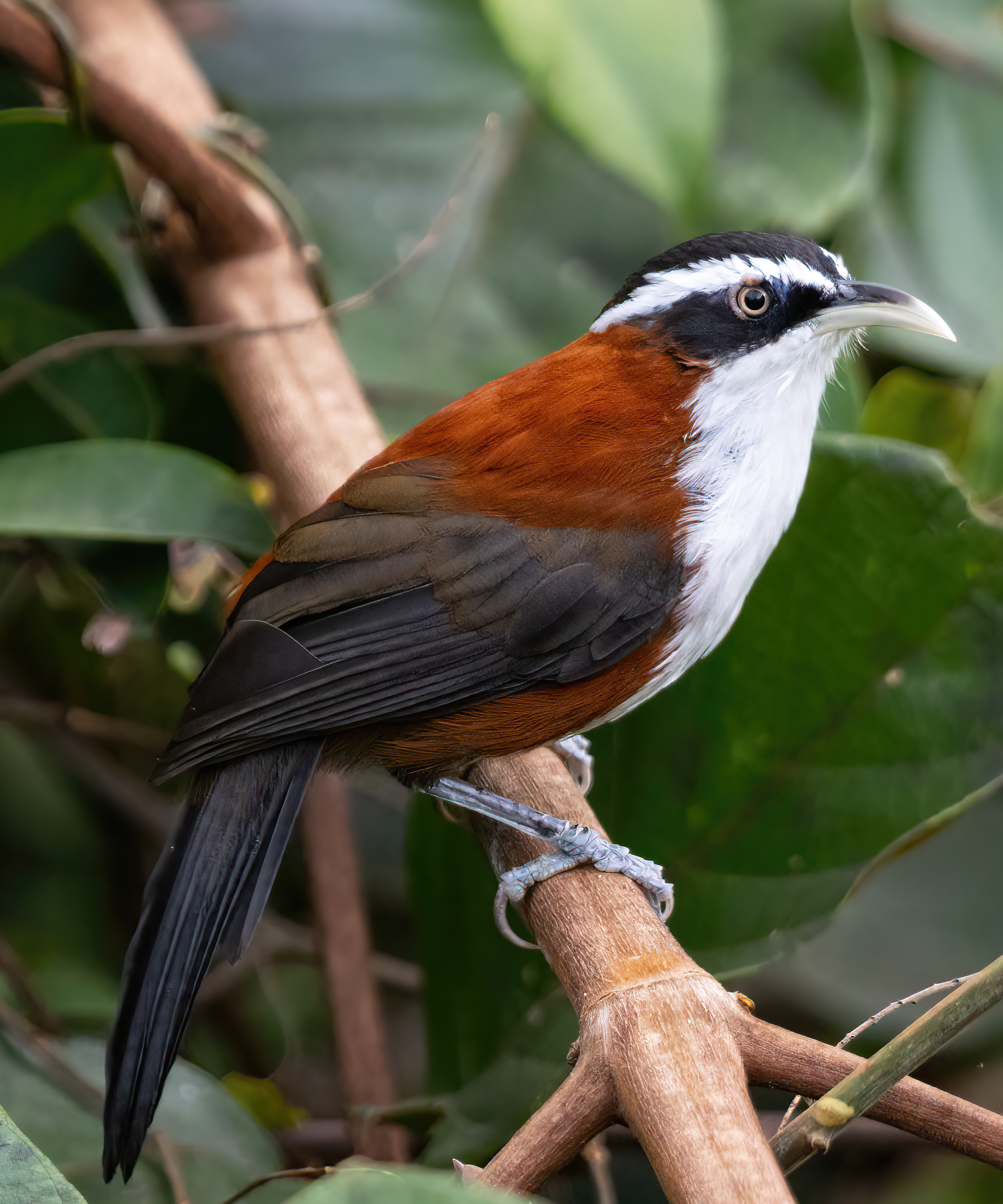
- In Ba'kelalan, Sarawak, Malaysia

Conservation status
- Least Concern (IUCN 3.1)

Scientific classification
- Kingdom: Animalia
- Phylum: Chordata
- Class: Aves
- Order: Passeriformes
- Family: Timaliidae
- Genus: Pomatorhinus
- Species: P. bornensis

Binomial name
- Pomatorhinus bornensis Cabanis, 1851

= Sunda scimitar babbler =

Species of bird

The Sunda scimitar babbler (Pomatorhinus bornensis) is a species of bird in the family Timaliidae. It is endemic to Sumatra, Borneo, and Malaysia. The Sunda scimitar babbler and the Javan scimitar babbler were previously grouped together as the chestnut-backed scimitar babbler. Its natural habitats are subtropical or tropical moist lowland forest and subtropical or tropical moist montane forest.
