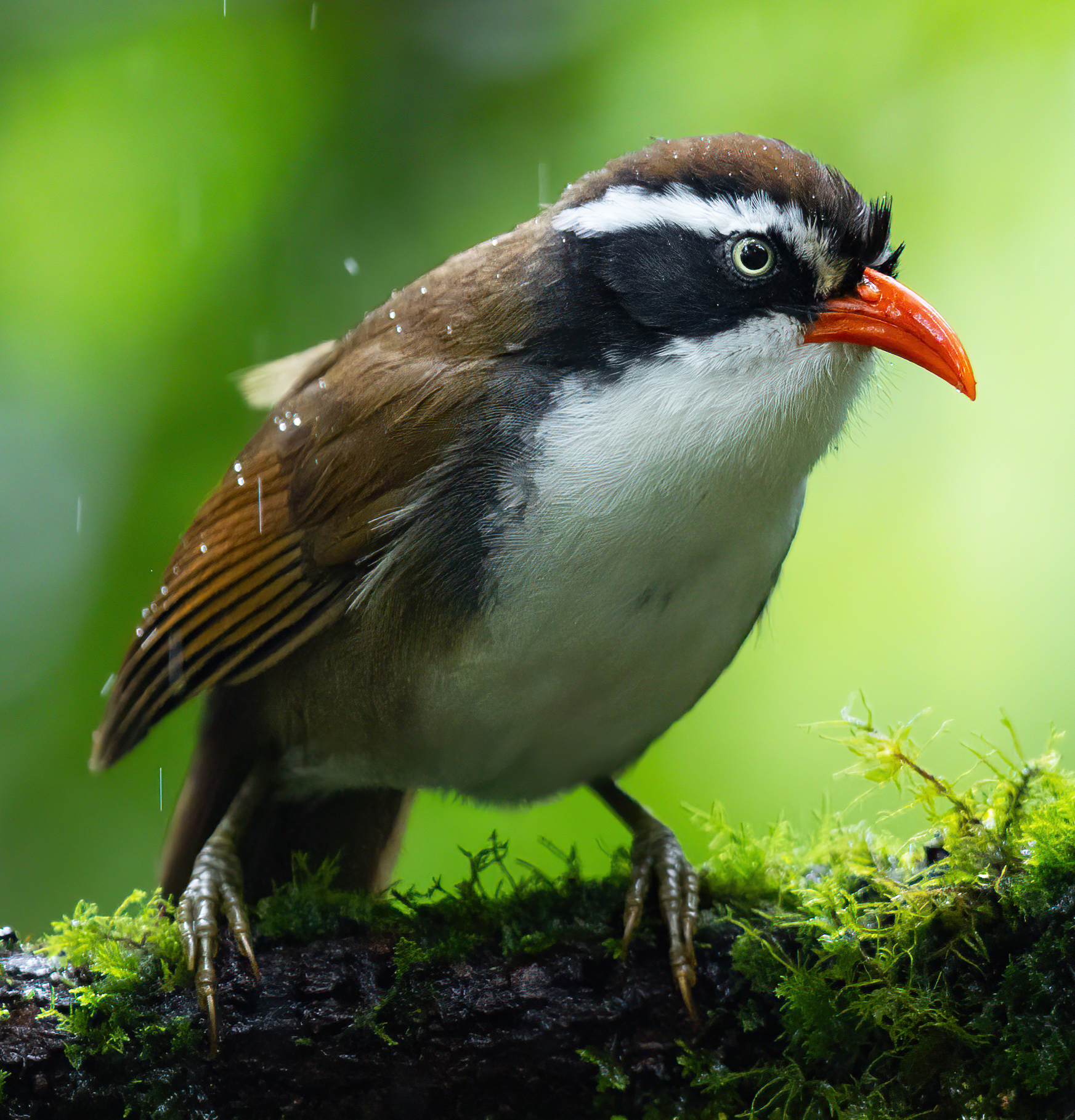

Conservation status
- Least Concern (IUCN 3.1)

Scientific classification
- Kingdom: Animalia
- Phylum: Chordata
- Class: Aves
- Order: Passeriformes
- Family: Timaliidae
- Genus: Pomatorhinus
- Species: P. phayrei

Binomial name
- Pomatorhinus phayrei Blyth, 1847

= Brown-crowned scimitar babbler =

Species of bird

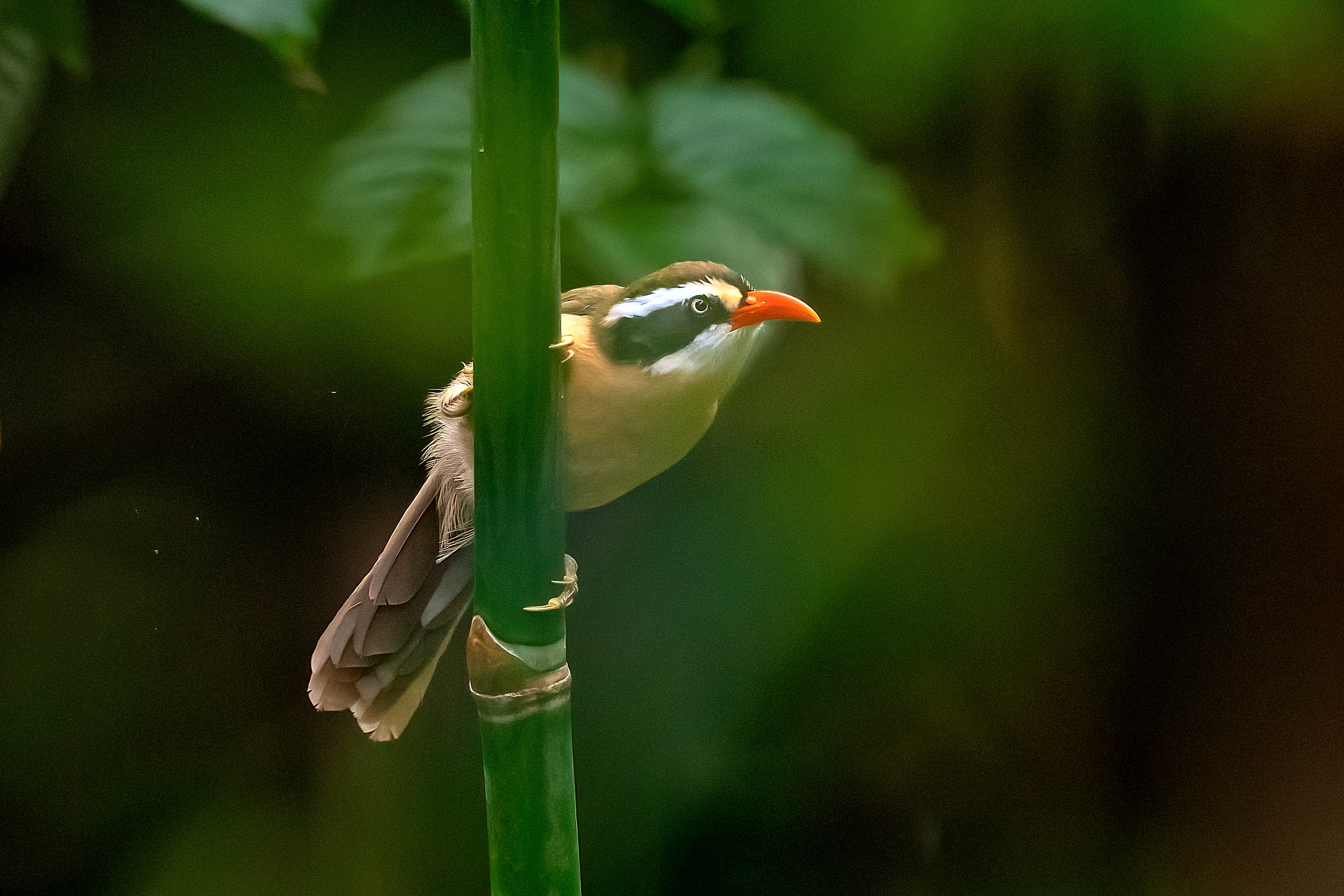

The brown-crowned scimitar babbler (Pomatorhinus phayrei) is a species of bird in the family Timaliidae. It is found in Bhutan, India, Myanmar, Thailand, Laos, Vietnam, and China. Its natural habitat is subtropical moist montane forest.
