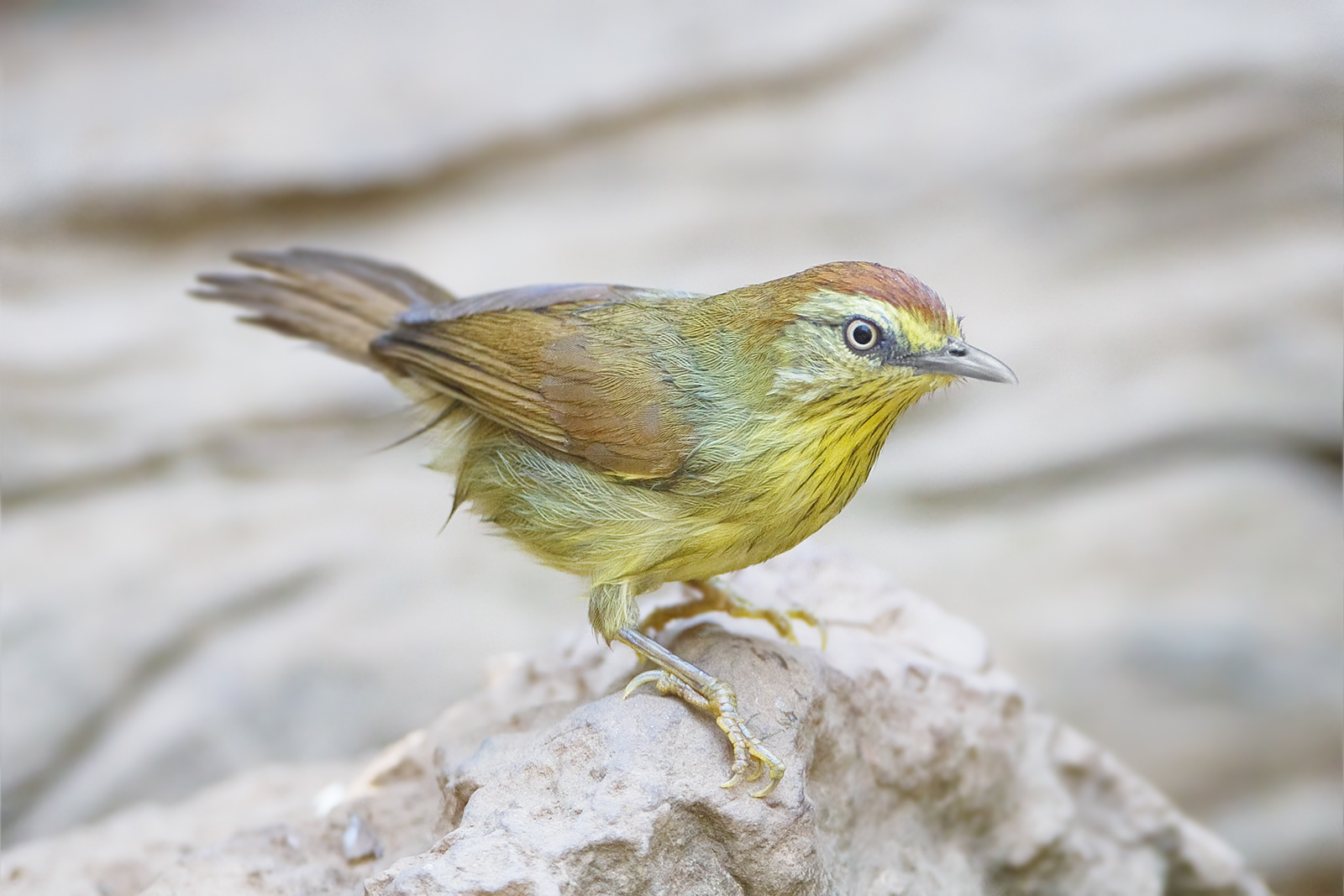
- Pin-striped tit-babbler (Mixornis gularis)

Scientific classification
- Kingdom: Animalia
- Phylum: Chordata
- Class: Aves
- Order: Passeriformes
- Superfamily: Sylvioidea
- Family: Timaliidae; Vigors & Horsfield, 1827

Genera
- See article text

= Timaliidae =

Babblers

Family of birds

The Timaliidae are a family of mostly Old World passerine birds. They are rather diverse in size and coloration, but are characterised by soft, fluffy plumage. These are birds of tropical areas, with the greatest variety in Southeast Asia and the Indian subcontinent. The timaliids are one of two unrelated groups of birds known as babblers, the other being the Australasian babblers of the family Pomatostomidae (also known as pseudo-babblers). This family takes its name from the genus Timalia: this generic name was coined by the French zoologist Georges Cuvier in 1821. Although Cuvier did not explain its etymology, it is thought to be based on a Latinized form of an Asian vernacular name (probably Hindu or Indo-Malaysian languages) for these birds, as many species in this family are native to South and Southeast Asia.

Morphological diversity is rather high; most species resemble "warblers", jays or thrushes. This group is among those Old World bird families with the highest number of species still being discovered.

== Characteristics ==
Timaliids are small to medium birds. They have strong legs, and many are quite terrestrial. They typically have generalised bills, similar to those of a thrush or warbler, except for the scimitar babblers which, as their name implies, have strongly decurved bills. Most have predominantly brown plumage, with minimal difference between the sexes, but many more brightly coloured species also exist.

This group is not strongly migratory, and most species have short rounded wings, and a weak flight. They live in lightly wooded or scrubland environments, ranging from swamp to near-desert. They are primarily insectivorous, although many will also take berries, and the larger species will even eat small lizards and other vertebrates.

Typical babblers live in communities of around a dozen birds, jointly defending a territory. Many even breed communally, with a dominant pair building a nest, and the remainder helping to defend and rear their young. Young males remain with the group, while females move away to find a new group, and thus avoid inbreeding. They make nests from twigs, and hide them in dense vegetation.

== Taxonomy and systematics ==
The systematics of Old World babblers have long been contested. During much of the 20th century, the family was used as a "wastebin taxon" for numerous hard-to-place Old World songbirds (such as Picathartidae and Pnoepygidae, as well as the New World species the wrentit). The German ornithologist Ernst Hartert summarized this attitude with the statement that, in the passerines: "Was man nicht unterbringen kann, sieht man als Timalien an." (What one can't place systematically is considered an Old World babbler).

The most obviously misplaced taxa were removed piecemeal towards the end of the last century. Since then, with the aid of DNA sequence data, it has been confirmed that even the remaining group is not monophyletic. Analysis of mtDNA cytochrome b and 12S/16S rRNA data (Cibois 2003a) spread the Timaliidae that were studied across what essentially was a badly resolved polytomy with Old World warblers and white-eyes. As the typical warblers (genus Sylvia) grouped with some presumed timaliids (such as the fulvettas), it was suggested that some Sylviidae should be moved to the Timaliidae.

The phylogenetic relationships between Timaliidae and other families was determined in a molecular phylogenetic study by Tianlong Cai and collaborators that was published in 2019. It is shown in the cladogram below:

- - - Pycnonotidae – bulbuls (161 species)
    - - - Sylviidae – sylviid babblers (32 species)
        - Paradoxornithidae – parrotbills and myzornis (38 species)
      - - Zosteropidae – white-eyes (147 species)
        - - Timaliidae – babblers (58 species)
          - - Pellorneidae – ground babblers (65 species)
            - Leiothrichidae – laughingthrushes and allies (143 species)

The cladogram below shows the relationships between the genera. These were determined in the same study by Cai and collaborators.

- Timaliidae
  - - - Timalia – chestnut-capped babbler
      - - Dumetia – babblers (2 species)
        - Mixornis – tit-babblers (5 species)
    - - Macronus – tit-babblers (2 species)
      - Cyanoderma – babblers (8 species)
  - - Spelaeornis – wren-babblers (8 species)
    - - - Melanocichla – laughingthrushes (2 species)
        - Pomatorhinus – scimitar babblers (10 species)
      - - Erythrogenys – scimitar babblers (6 species)
        - Stachyris – babblers (13 species)

=== List of genera ===
The family as currently constituted includes 58 species divided into the following ten genera:

Image	Genus	Living species
	Erythrogenys Baker, 1930 – scimitar-babblers	Large scimitar babbler, Erythrogenys hypoleucos; Black-necklaced scimitar babbler, Erythrogenys erythrocnemis; Black-streaked scimitar babbler, Erythrogenys gravivox; Spot-breasted scimitar babbler, Erythrogenys mcclellandi; Grey-sided scimitar babbler, Erythrogenys swinhoei; Rusty-cheeked scimitar babbler, Erythrogenys erythrogenys
	Pomatorhinus Horsfield, 1821 – scimitar-babblers	Indian scimitar babbler, Pomatorhinus horsfieldii; Sri Lanka scimitar babbler Pomatorhinus melanurus; White-browed scimitar babbler, Pomatorhinus schisticeps; Javan scimitar babbler, Pomatorhinus montanus; Sunda scimitar babbler, Pomatorhinus bornensis; Streak-breasted scimitar babbler, Pomatorhinus ruficollis; Taiwan scimitar babbler, Pomatorhinus musicus; Red-billed scimitar babbler, Pomatorhinus ochraceiceps; Black-crowned scimitar babbler, Pomatorhinus ferruginosus; Brown-crowned scimitar babbler, Pomatorhinus phayrei; Slender-billed scimitar babbler, Pomatorhinus superciliaris
	Spelaeornis David & Oustalet, 1877 – typical wren-babblers	Rufous-throated wren-babbler, Spelaeornis caudatus; Mishmi wren-babbler, Spelaeornis badeigularis; Bar-winged wren-babbler, Spelaeornis troglodytoides; Naga wren-babbler, Spelaeornis chocolatinus; Grey-bellied wren-babbler, Spelaeornis reptatus; Chin Hills wren-babbler, Spelaeornis oatesi; Pale-throated wren-babbler, Spelaeornis kinneari; Tawny-breasted wren-babbler, Spelaeornis longicaudatus
	Stachyris Hodgson, 1844	White-breasted babbler, Stachyris grammiceps; Sooty babbler, Stachyris herberti; Nonggang babbler, Stachyris nonggangensis; Grey-throated babbler, Stachyris nigriceps; Grey-headed babbler, Stachyris poliocephala; Spot-necked babbler, Stachyris strialata; Snowy-throated babbler, Stachyris oglei; Chestnut-rumped babbler, Stachyris maculata; White-necked babbler, Stachyris leucotis; Black-throated babbler, Stachyris nigricollis; White-bibbed babbler, Stachyris thoracica; Sikkim wedge-billed babbler, Stachyris humei; Cachar wedge-billed babbler, Stachyris roberti
	Cyanoderma Salvadori, 1874	Rufous-fronted babbler Cyanoderma rufifrons; Rufous-capped babbler Cyanoderma ruficeps; Black-chinned babbler Cyanoderma pyrrhops; Golden babbler Cyanoderma chrysaeum; Chestnut-winged babbler Cyanoderma erythropterum; Crescent-chested babbler Cyanoderma melanothorax; Buff-chested babbler Cyanoderma ambiguum
	Dumetia Blyth, 1852	Tawny-bellied babbler, Dumetia hyperythra; Dark-fronted babbler, Dumetia atriceps
	Mixornis Blyth, 1842 – tit-babblers	Pin-striped tit-babbler, Mixornis gularis; Bold-striped tit-babbler, Mixornis bornensis; Grey-cheeked tit-babbler, Mixornis flavicollis; Kangean tit-babbler, Mixornis prillwitzi; Grey-faced tit-babbler, Mixornis kelleyi
	Macronus Jardine & Selby, 1835 – tit-babblers	Brown tit-babbler, Macronus striaticeps; Fluffy-backed tit-babbler, Macronus ptilosus
	Timalia Horsfield, 1821	Chestnut-capped babbler, Timalia pileata
	Melanocichla Sharpe, 1883	Black laughingthrush, Melanocichla lugubris; Bare-headed laughingthrush, Melanocichla calva
