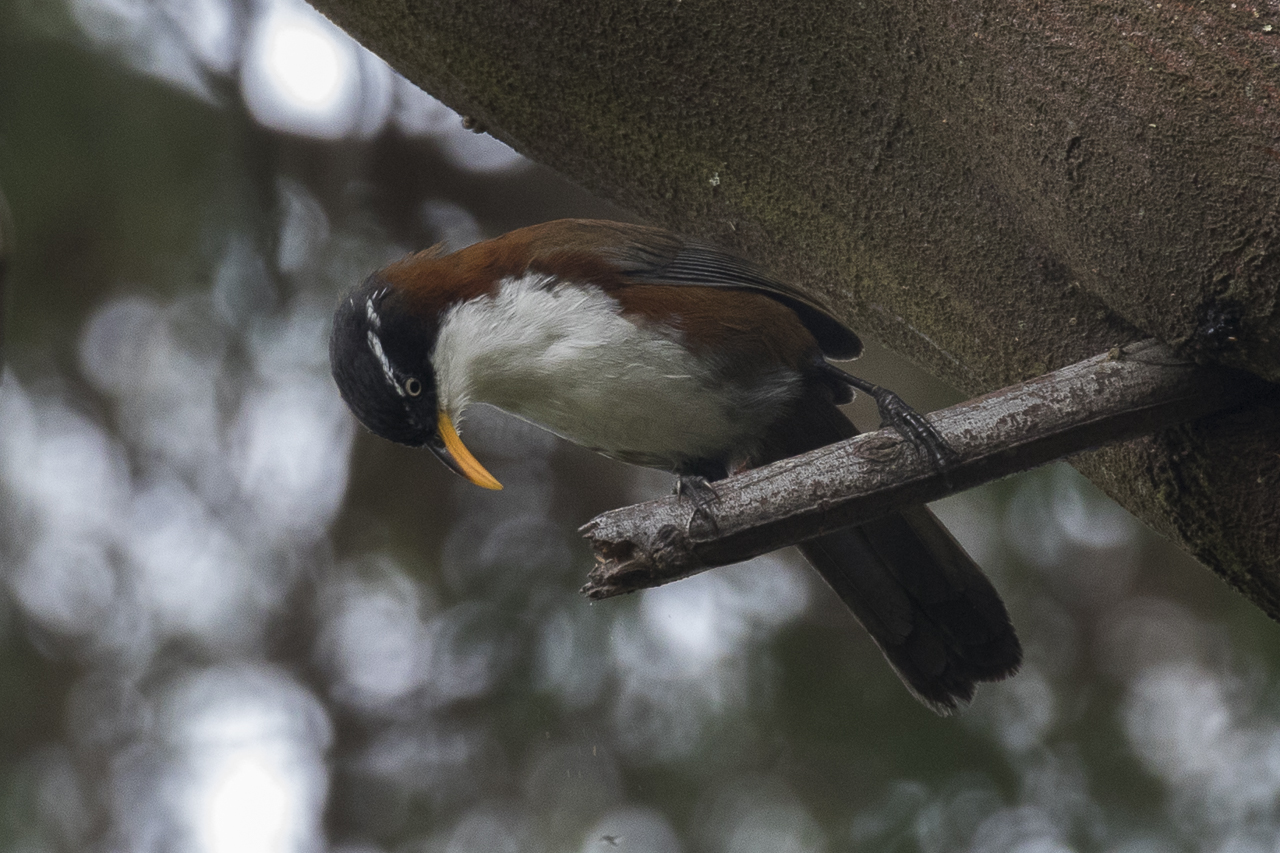
- In East Java, Indonesia

Conservation status
- Least Concern (IUCN 3.1)

Scientific classification
- Kingdom: Animalia
- Phylum: Chordata
- Class: Aves
- Order: Passeriformes
- Family: Timaliidae
- Genus: Pomatorhinus
- Species: P. montanus

Binomial name
- Pomatorhinus montanus Horsfield, 1821

= Javan scimitar babbler =

Species of bird

The Javan scimitar babbler (Pomatorhinus montanus) is a species of bird in the family Timaliidae. It is endemic to Java, Indonesia. The Sunda scimitar babbler (P. bornensis), which is found in Sumatra, Borneo, and Malaysia, was formerly considered conspecific, with both species being grouped as the chestnut-backed scimitar babbler. Its natural habitats are subtropical or tropical moist lowland forest and subtropical or tropical moist montane forest.

It feeds on invertebrates.
