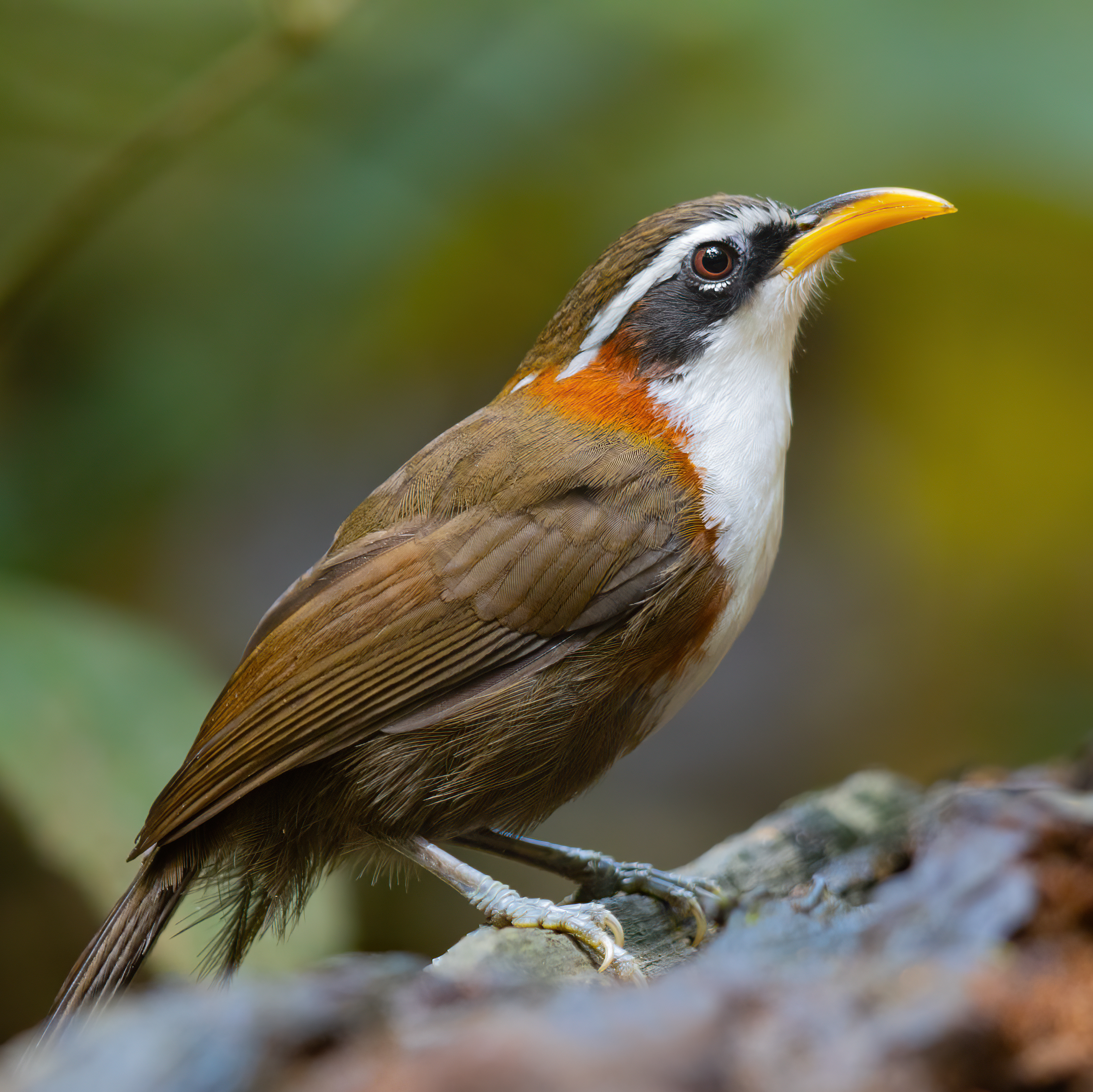

Conservation status
- Least Concern (IUCN 3.1)

Scientific classification
- Kingdom: Animalia
- Phylum: Chordata
- Class: Aves
- Order: Passeriformes
- Family: Timaliidae
- Genus: Pomatorhinus
- Species: P. schisticeps

Binomial name
- Pomatorhinus schisticeps Hodgson, 1836

= White-browed scimitar babbler =

Species of bird

The white-browed scimitar babbler (Pomatorhinus schisticeps) is a species of bird in the family Timaliidae. It is found in Bangladesh, Bhutan, Cambodia, India, Laos, Myanmar, Nepal, Thailand, and Vietnam. Its natural habitats are subtropical or tropical moist lowland forest and subtropical or tropical moist montane forest.
