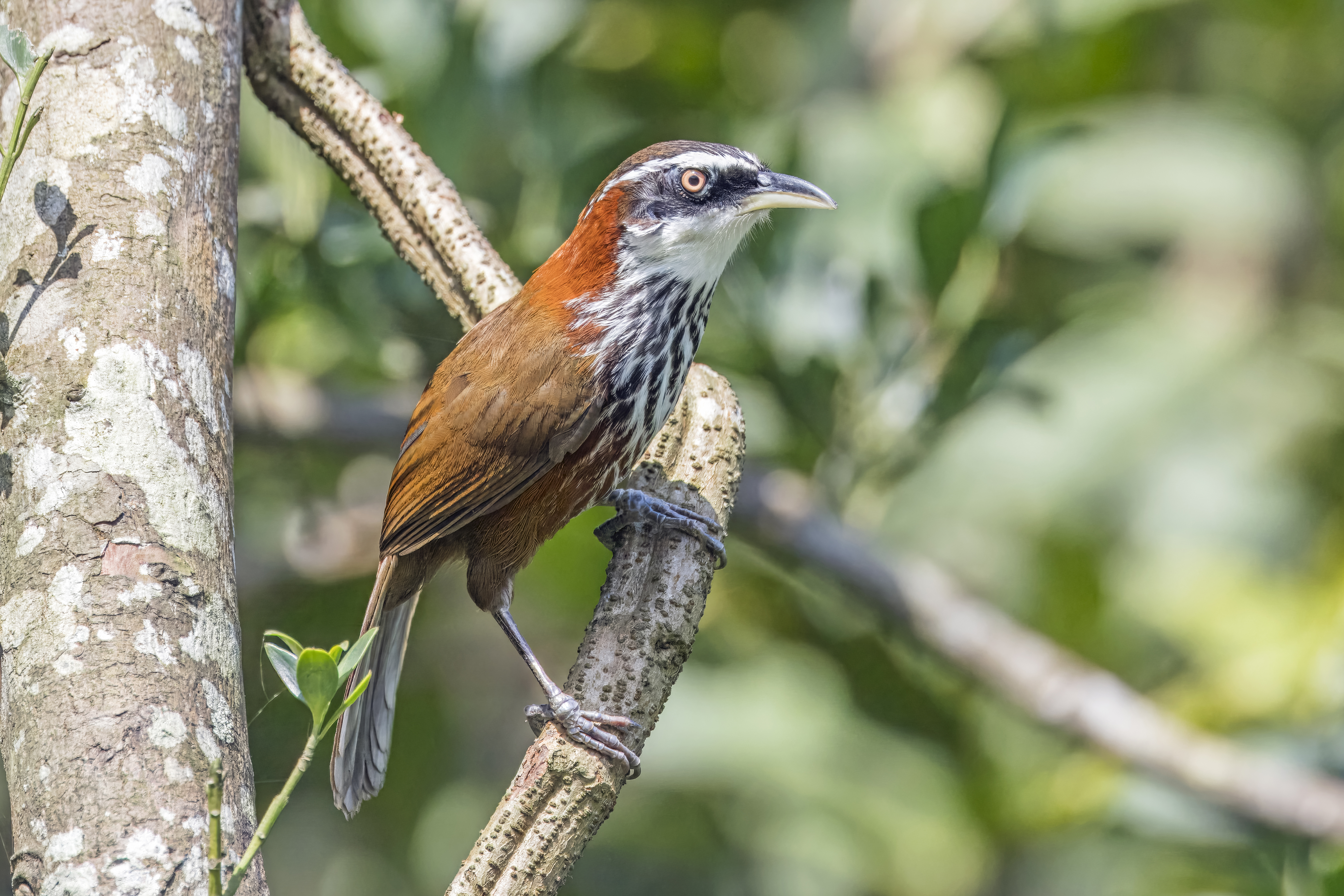

Conservation status
- Least Concern (IUCN 3.1)

Scientific classification
- Kingdom: Animalia
- Phylum: Chordata
- Class: Aves
- Order: Passeriformes
- Family: Timaliidae
- Genus: Pomatorhinus
- Species: P. musicus

Binomial name
- Pomatorhinus musicus Swinhoe, 1859

Synonyms
- Pomatorhinus ruficollis musicus

= Taiwan scimitar babbler =

Species of bird

The Taiwan scimitar babbler (Pomatorhinus musicus) is a bird in the family Timaliidae, the Old World babblers. It is endemic to Taiwan. The species was first described by Robert Swinhoe in 1859. It was formerly treated as a subspecies of the streak-breasted scimitar babbler. Its population is declining, but not rapidly enough for it to be considered vulnerable.

== Description ==
The Taiwan scimitar babbler is a small (16–21 cm, 40 g) scimitar babbler. The upperparts are dark grey-brown, the underparts are white on the throat and the upper breast, with strong rusty brown or greyish streaks from the lower part of the throat to blackish on the flanks. The head has a broad black facial mask and black bridle, chestnut brown neck, white eyebrow line and black eyes.

It differs from the similar streak-breasted scimitar babbler (with which it was previously considered conspecific), by it differs with a slightly larger size and proportionally longer bill with a completely dark upper half. Furthermore, the crown is dark greyish rather than brown, the neck is deeper and broader chestnut brown. On the flanks it is also visible that the belly and flanks are heavily tinged with chestnut brown.

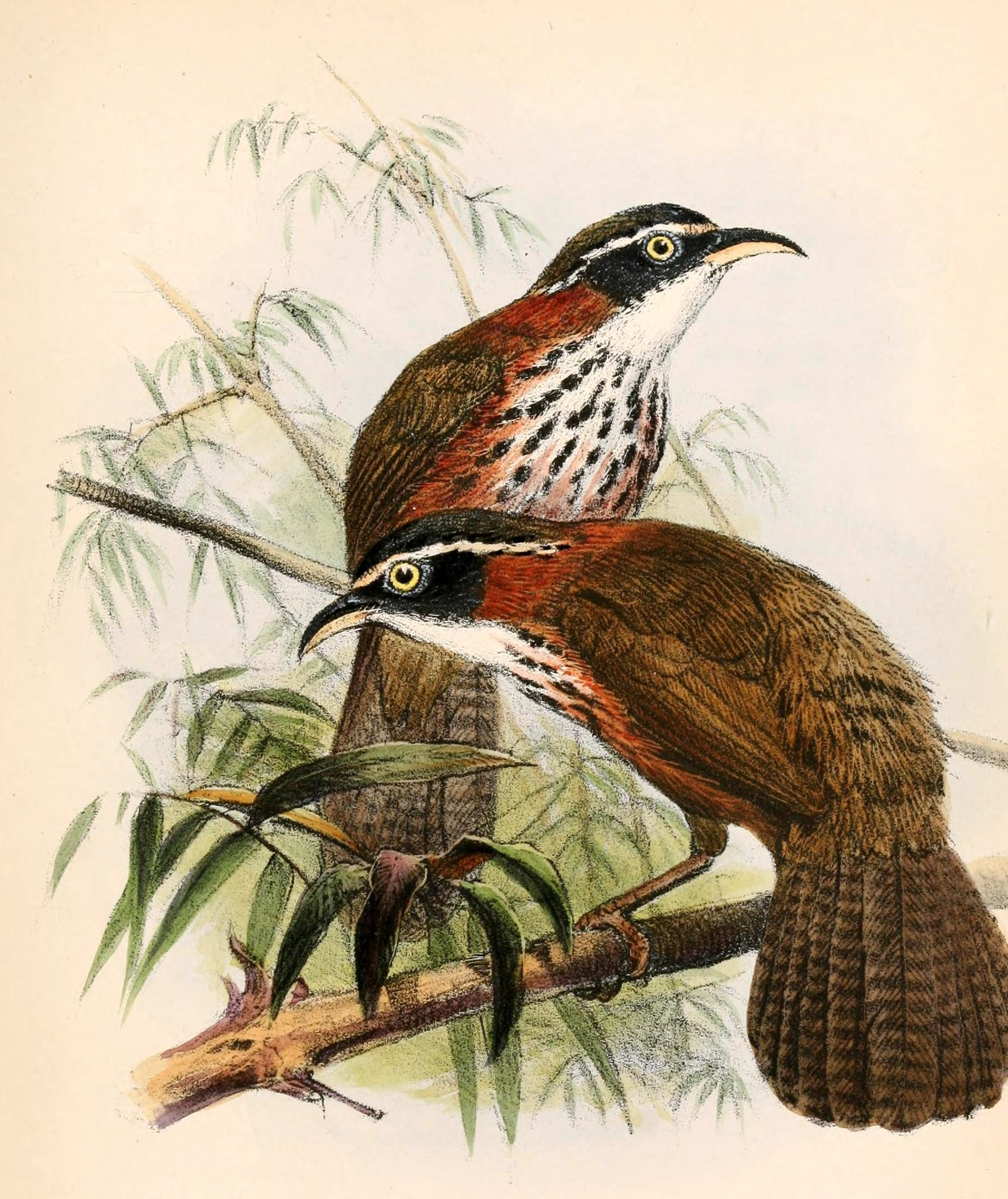
Illustration by Joseph Wolf (1863)
