= Allan Octavian Hume =

British politician and civil servant (1829–1912)

Allan Octavian Hume CB ICS
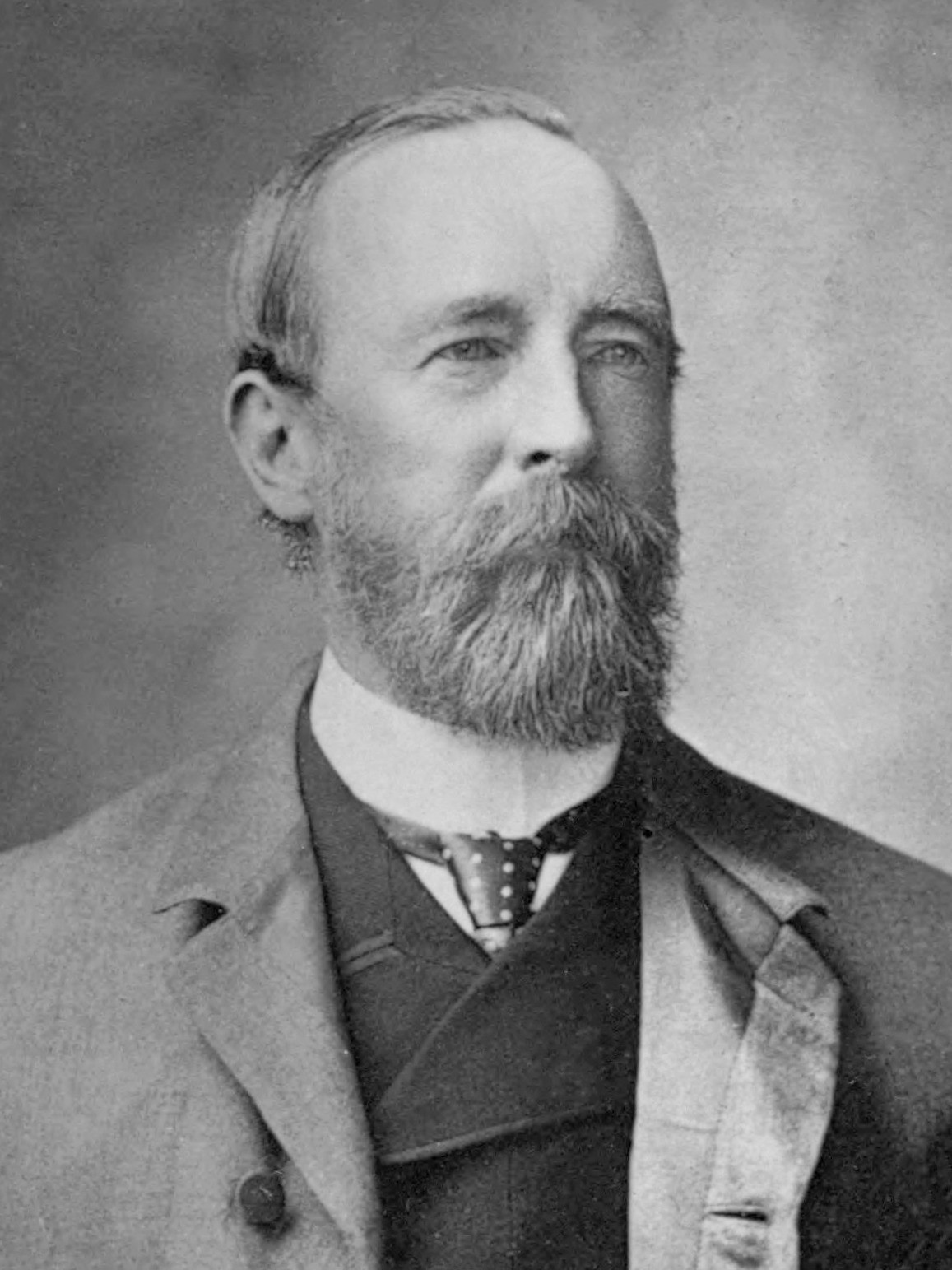
- Hume in 1889

Founder of Indian National Congress
- In office 1885–1887

Personal details
- Born: 4 June 1829 Westminster, England
- Died: 31 July 1912 (aged 83) Upper Norwood, London, England
- Spouse: Mary Anne Grindall (m. 1853)
- Children: Maria Jane "Minnie" Burnley
- Parent: Joseph Hume (father)
- Relatives: Mary Hume-Rothery (sister)
- Education: University College Hospital, East India Company College
- Occupation: Political reformer; ornithologist; biologist; administrator
- Known for: Founding of Indian National Congress; Father of Indian Ornithology; Founding the South London Botanical Institute
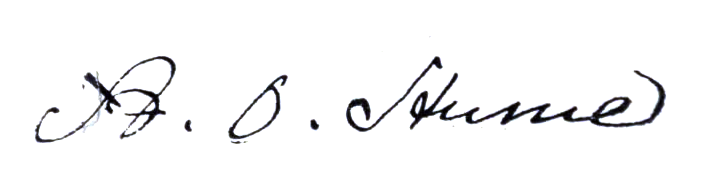
- Signature
- Scientific career
- Author abbrev. (zoology): Hume

Allan Octavian Hume (4 June 1829 – 31 July 1912) was a British political reformer, ornithologist, civil servant and botanist who worked in British India and was the founding spirit and key founder of the Indian National Congress. He was a proponent of Indian self-rule and strongly supported the idea of Indian independence. He supported the idea of self-governance by Indians. A notable ornithologist, Hume has been called "the Father of Indian Ornithology" and, by those who found him dogmatic, "the Pope of Indian Ornithology".

As the collector of Etawah, he saw the Indian Rebellion of 1857 as a result of misgovernance and made great efforts to improve the lives of the common people. The district of Etawah was among the first to be returned to normality and over the next few years Hume's reforms led to the district being considered a model of development. Hume rose in the ranks of the Indian Civil Service but like his father Joseph Hume, a Radical member of parliament, he was bold and outspoken in questioning British policies in India. He rose in 1871 to the position of secretary to the Department of Revenue, Agriculture, and Commerce under Lord Mayo who was assassinated a year later. He did not get along as well with subsequent viceroys, and his criticism of Lord Lytton's policies led to his removal from the Secretariat in 1879.

He founded the journal Stray Feathers in which he and his subscribers recorded notes on birds from across India. He built up a vast collection of bird specimens at his home in Shimla by making collection expeditions and obtaining specimens through his network of correspondents.

Following the loss of manuscripts that he had long worked on in the hope of producing a magnum opus on the birds of India, he abandoned ornithology and gifted his collection to the Natural History Museum in London, where it continues to be the single largest collection of Indian bird skins. He was briefly a follower of the theosophical movement founded by Madame Blavatsky. He worked for Indian self-governance through the Indian National Congress that he founded. He left India in 1894 to live in London from where he continued to take an interest in the Indian National Congress. He maintained an interest in English botany and founded the South London Botanical Institute towards the end of his life.

== Early life ==
Hume was born in Westminster, London and baptised at St Mary's, Bryanston Square, a younger son (and the eighth of nine children) of Joseph Hume, the Radical Scottish member of parliament, by his marriage to Maria Burnley. Until the age of eleven he was privately tutored growing up at the town house at 6 Bryanston Square in London and at their country estate, Burnley Hall in Norfolk. He was educated at University College Hospital, where he studied medicine and surgery and was then nominated to the Indian Civil Services which led him to study at the East India Company College, Haileybury. Early influences included his friend John Stuart Mill and Herbert Spencer. He briefly served as a junior midshipman aboard a navy vessel in the Mediterranean in 1842.

== Civil service ==
=== North-Western Provinces - Etawah (1849–1867) ===
Hume sailed to India in 1849 and on reaching Calcutta, he stayed with his cousin James Hume, The following year, he joined the Bengal Civil Service at Etawah in the North-Western Provinces, in what is now Uttar Pradesh. His career in India included service as a district officer from 1849 to 1867, head of a central department from 1867 to 1870, and secretary to the Government from 1870 to 1879. He married Mary Anne (26 May 1824, Meerut – 30 March 1890, Simla), daughter of Rivers Francis Grindall (1786–1832) in 1853. He had a home, possibly used in summer, in Mussoorie in 1853. In 1853 he clashed with his higher up, magistrate Mark B. Thornhill of Dehra Dun, who had failed to cooperate on a case that Hume was dealing with in Mussoorie. Hume in turn refused to hand over papers relating to civil cases that he was dealing with in Mussoorie. Hume accused Thornhill of abuse of authority and Thornhill sent an armed contingent to forcibly take away the papers from Hume. The altercations resulted in his transfer to Aligarh. The court in Agra examined the case between Hume and Thornhill and concluded that Hume was indeed correct in his interpretation of the law but that he was showing an "undue spirit of opposition." This Aligarh posting was short and he was then promoted as joint magistrate and deputy collector of Mainpuri district in June 1854. By May 1855 he was promoted to collector at Bulandshahr and then to officiating magistrate at Etawah in February 1856.

It was only nine years after his entry to India that Hume faced the Indian Rebellion of 1857 during which time he was involved in several military actions for which he was created a Companion of the Bath in 1860. Initially it appeared that he was safe in Etawah, not far from Meerut where the rebellion began but this changed and Hume had to take refuge in Agra fort for six months. Nonetheless, all but one Indian official remained loyal and Hume resumed his position in Etawah in January 1858. He built up an irregular force of 650 loyal Indian troops and took part in engagements with them. Hume blamed British ineptitude for the uprising and pursued a policy of "mercy and forbearance" when dealing with the captured rebels. Only seven persons were executed at the gallows on his orders. The district of Etawah was restored to peace and order in a year, something that was not possible in most other parts.

Shortly after 1857, he set about in a range of reforms. As a District Officer in the Indian Civil Service, he began introducing free primary education and held public meetings for their support. He made changes in the functioning of the police department and the separation of the judicial role. Noting that there was very little reading material with educational content, he started, along with Koour Lutchman Singh, a Hindi language periodical, Lokmitra (The People's Friend) in 1859. Originally meant only for Etawah, its fame spread. Hume also organised and managed an Urdu journal Muhib-i-riaya.

The system of departmental examinations introduced soon after (Hume joined the civil services) enabled Hume to so outdistance his seniors that when the rebellion broke out he was officiating Collector of Etawah, which lies between Agra and Cawnpur. Rebel troops were constantly passing through the district, and for a time it was necessary to abandon headquarters; but both before and after the removal of the women and children to Agra, Hume acted with vigour and judgment. The steadfast loyalty of many native officials and landowners, and the people generally, was largely due to his influence, and enabled him to raise a local brigade of horse. In a daring attack on a body of rebels at Jaswantnagar he carried away the wounded joint magistrate, Mr. Clearmont Daniel, under a heavy fire, and many months later he engaged in a desperate action against Firoz Shah and his Oudh freebooters at Hurchandpur. Company rule had come to an end before the ravines of the Jumna and the Chambul in the district had been cleared of fugitive rebels. Hume richly merited the C.B. (Civil division) awarded him in 1860. He remained in charge of the district for ten years or so and did good work.

— Obituary The Times of August 1st, 1912

He took up the cause of education and founded scholarships for higher education. He wrote, in 1859, that education played a key role in avoiding revolts like the one in 1857:

... assert its supremacy as it may at the bayonet's point, a free and civilised government must look for its stability and permanence to the enlightenment of the people and their moral and intellectual capacity to appreciate its blessings.

In 1863 he moved for separate schools for juvenile delinquents rather than flogging and imprisonment which he saw as producing hardened criminals. His efforts led to a juvenile reformatory not far from Etawah. He also started free schools in Etawah and by 1857 he established 181 schools with 5186 students including two girls. The high school that he helped build with his own money is still in operation, now as a junior college, and it was said to have a floor plan resembling the letter "H". This, according to some was an indication of Hume's imperial ego. Hume found the idea of earning revenue earned through liquor traffic repulsive and described it as "The wages of sin". With his progressive ideas on social reform, he advocated women's education, was against infanticide and enforced widowhood. Hume laid out in Etawah, a neatly gridded commercial district that is now known as Humeganj but often pronounced Homeganj.

=== Commissioner of Customs (1867–1870) ===
In 1867 Hume became Commissioner of Customs for the North West Province, and in 1870 he became attached to the central government as Director-General of Agriculture. In 1879 he returned to provincial government at Allahabad. His work on reducing the burden involved in the maintenance of the customs department controlling the movement of salt, which included the 2500 mile-long Inland Customs Line, the so-called great hedge, led to his promotion by Lord Mayo who rewarded him with Secretaryship and was moved in 1871 to the Department of Revenue and Agriculture.

=== Secretary to the Department of Revenue, Agriculture and Commerce (1871–1879) ===
Hume was very interested in the development of agriculture. He believed that there was too much focus on obtaining revenue and no effort had been spent on improving the efficiency of agriculture. He found an ally in Lord Mayo who supported the idea of developing a complete department of agriculture. Hume noted in his Agricultural reform in India that Lord Mayo had been the only Viceroy who had any experience of working in the fields.

Hume made a number of suggestions for the improvement of agriculture placing carefully gathered evidence for his ideas. He noted the poor yields of wheat, comparing them with estimates from the records of Emperor Akbar and yields of farms in Norfolk. Lord Mayo supported his ideas but was unable to establish a dedicated agricultural bureau as the scheme did not find support from the Secretary of State for India, but they negotiated the setting up of a Department of Revenue, Agriculture and Commerce despite Hume's insistence that Agriculture be the first and foremost aim. The department had charge on land revenue, settlements, advances for works in agricultural improvement, horticulture, livestock breeding, silk, fiber, forests, commerce and trade, salt, opium, excise, stamps, and industrial art. It also collected data and was in charge of censuses, the gazetteers, surveys, geology, and meteorology. Hume was made Secretary of this department in July 1871 leading to his move to Shimla.

With the murder of Lord Mayo in the Andamans in 1872, Hume lost patronage and support for his work. He however went about reforming the department of agriculture, streamlining the collection of meteorological data (the meteorological department was set up by order number 56 on 27 September 1875 signed by Hume) and statistics on cultivation and yield.

Hume proposed the idea of having experimental farms to demonstrate best practices to be set up in every district. He proposed to develop fuelwood plantations "in every village in the drier portions of the country" and thereby provide a substitute heating and cooking fuel so that manure (dried cattle dung was used as fuel by the poor) could be returned to the land. Such plantations, he wrote, were "a thing that is entirely in accord with the traditions of the country – a thing that the people would understand, appreciate, and, with a little judicious pressure, cooperate in." He wanted model farms to be established in every district. He noted that rural indebtedness was caused mainly by the use of land as security, a practice that had been introduced by the British. Hume denounced it as another of "the cruel blunders into which our narrow-minded, though wholly benevolent, desire to reproduce England in India has led us." Hume also wanted government-run banks, at least until cooperative banks could be established.

The department also supported the publication of several manuals on aspects of cultivation, a list of which Hume included as an appendix to his Agricultural Reform in India. Hume supported the introduction of cinchona and the project managed by George King to produce quinine in India and deliver malaria medication across India through the postal department at low cost.

Hume was very outspoken and never feared to criticise when he thought the Government was in the wrong. Even in 1861, he objected to the concentration of police and judicial functions in the hands of police superintendents. In March 1861, he took a medical leave due to a breakdown from overwork and departed for Britain. Before leaving, he condemned the flogging and punitive measures initiated by the provincial government as 'barbarous ... torture'. He was allowed to return to Etawah only after apologising for the tone of his criticism. He criticised the administration of Lord Lytton before 1879 which according to him, had cared little for the welfare and aspiration of the people of India.

Lord Lytton's foreign policy according to Hume had led to the waste of "millions and millions of Indian money". Hume was critical of the land revenue policy and suggested that it was the cause of poverty in India. His superiors were irritated and attempted to restrict his powers and this led him to publish a book on Agricultural Reform in India in 1879.

Hume noted that the free and honest expression was not only permitted but encouraged under Lord Mayo and that this freedom was curtailed under Lord Northbrook who succeeded Lord Mayo. When Lord Lytton succeeded Lord Northbrook, the situation worsened for Hume. In 1879 Hume went against the authorities. The Government of Lord Lytton dismissed him from his position in the Secretariat. No clear reason was given except that it "was based entirely on the consideration of what was most desirable in the interests of the public service". The press declared that his main wrongdoing was that he was too honest and too independent. The Pioneer wrote that it was "the grossest jobbery ever perpetrated"; the Indian Daily News wrote that it was a "great wrong" while The Statesman said that "undoubtedly he has been treated shamefully and cruelly." The Englishman in an article dated 27 June 1879, commenting on the event stated, "There is no security or safety now for officers in Government employment." Demoted, he left Shimla and returned to the North-West Provinces in October 1879, as a member of the Board of Revenue. It has been pointed out that he was victimised as he was out of step with the policies of the Government, often intruding into aspects of administration with critical opinions.

=== Demotion and resignation (1879–1882) ===
In spite of the humiliation of demotion, he did not resign immediately from service and it has been suggested that this was because he needed his salary to support the publication of The Game Birds of India that he was working on. Hume retired from the civil service only in 1882. In 1883 he wrote an open letter to the graduates of Calcutta University, having been a fellow of the University of Calcutta from 1870, calling upon them to form their own national political movement. This led in 1885 to the first session of the Indian National Congress held in Bombay. In 1887, writing to the Public Commission of India, he made what was then a statement unexpected from a civil servant — I look upon myself as a Native of India.

=== Return to England 1894 ===
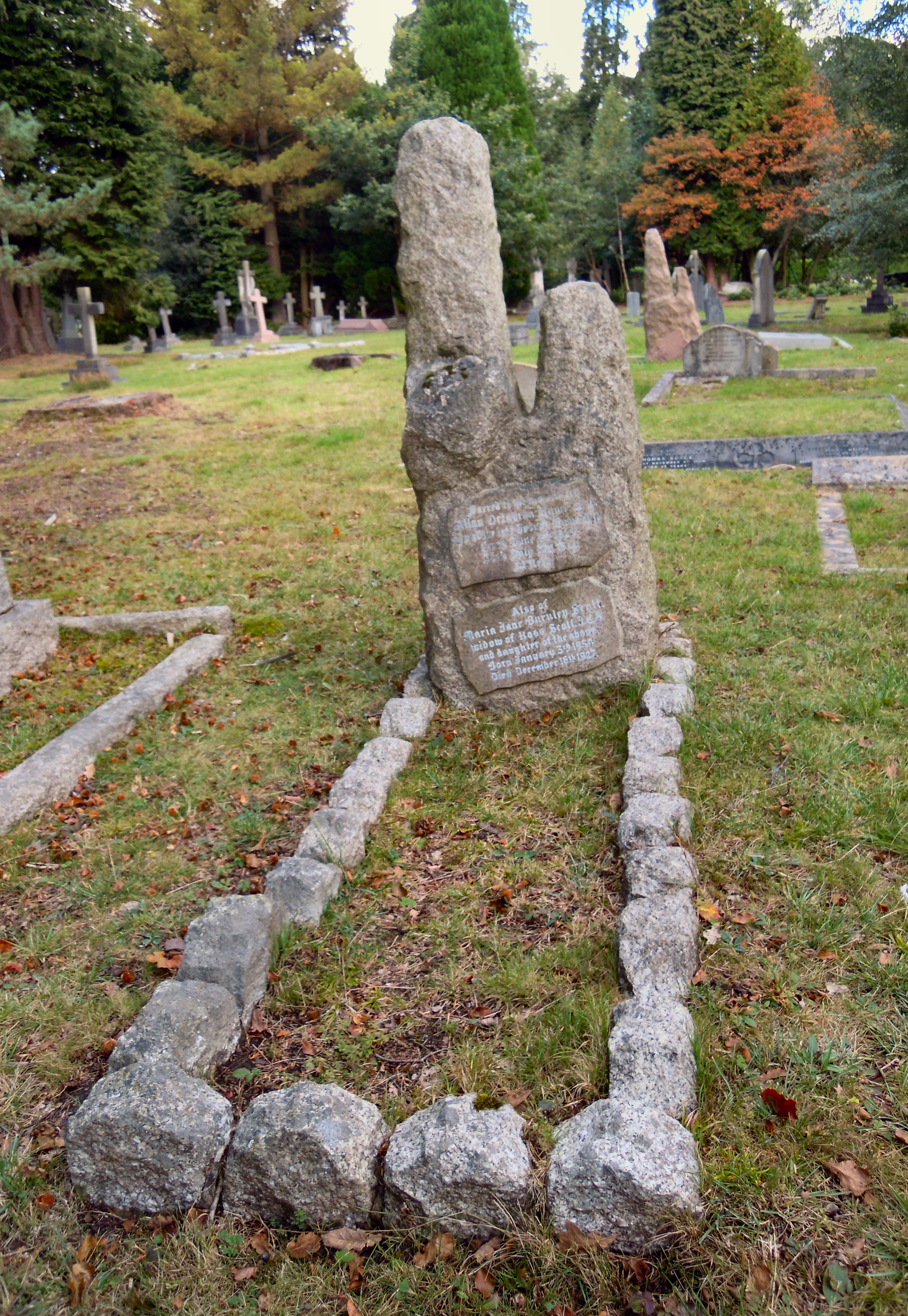
Hume's grave in Brookwood Cemetery

Hume's wife Mary died on 30 March 1890 and news of her death reached him just as he reached London on 1 April 1890. Their only daughter Maria Jane Burnley ("Minnie") (3 January 1854 – 16 December 1927) married Ross Scott at Shimla on 28 December 1881. Ross Scott had been the founding secretary of the Simla Eclectic Theosophical Society, whose founding president was Hume. Scott was for sometime Judicial Commissioner of Oudh before his death in 1908. Maria moved to England where she became a member of another occult movement, the Hermetic Order of the Golden Dawn. Hume's grandson Montague Allan Hume Scott served with the Royal Engineers in India, and received a Military Cross in 1917.

Hume left India in 1894 and settled at The Chalet, 4 Kingswood Road, Upper Norwood in south London. He died at the age of eighty-three on 31 July 1912. He was cremated and his ashes interred in Brookwood Cemetery. The bazaar in Etawah was closed on hearing of his death and the Collector, H. R. Nevill, presided over a memorial meeting.

The Indian postal department issued a commemorative stamp with his portrait in 1973 and a special cover depicting Rothney Castle, his home in Shimla, was released in 2013.

== Indian National Congress ==
Hume at the first session, Bombay, 28–31 December 1885

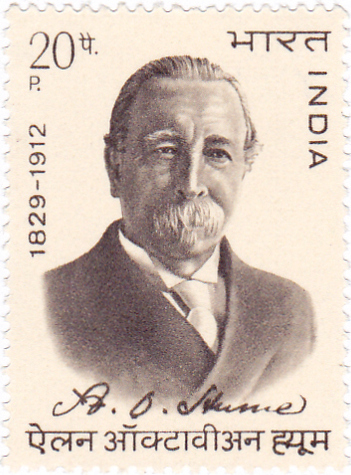
Hume on a 1973 stamp of India

Hume was noted for his pro-Indian activities. He believed that the British regime had failed in India, not from any lack of good attention but rather because of insufficient knowledge.

There were agrarian riots in the Deccan and Bombay, and Hume, according to some early writers like Pattabhi Sitaramayya, suggested that an Indian Union would be a good safety valve and outlet to avoid further unrest. This so-called "safety valve" theory of the origin of the Congress, first introduced by W.C. Bonnerjee, has been refuted on the basis that the seven volumes of the secret report were fictional. They were created by William Wedderburn to portray Hume as a British patriot. After retiring from the civil services and towards the end of Lord Lytton's rule, Hume observed that the people of India had a sense of hopelessness and wanted to do something, noting "a sudden violent outbreak of sporadic crime, murders of obnoxious persons, robbery of bankers and looting of bazaars, acts really of lawlessness which by a due coalescence of forces might any day develop into a National Revolt." Of the British government, he stated that "a studied and invariable disregard, if not actually contempt for the opinions and feelings of our subjects, is at the present day the leading characteristic of our government in every branch of the administration." On 1 March 1883, Hume wrote a letter to the graduates of the University of Calcutta:

If only fifty men, good and true, can be found to join as founders, the thing can be established and the further development will be comparatively easy. ...
And if even the leaders of thought are all either such poor creatures, or so selfishly wedded to personal concerns that they dare not strike a blow for their country's sake, then justly and rightly are they kept down and trampled on, for they deserve nothing better. Every nation secures precisely as good a Government as it merits. If you the picked men, the most highly educated of the nation, cannot, scorning personal ease and selfish objects, make a resolute struggle to secure greater freedom for yourselves and your country, a more impartial administration, a larger share in the management of your own affairs, then we, your friends, are wrong and our adversaries right, then are Lord Ripon's noble aspirations for your good fruitless and visionary, then, at present at any rate all hopes of progress are at an end and India truly neither desires nor deserves any better Government than she enjoys. Only, if this be so, let us hear no more factious, peevish complaints that you are kept in leading strings and treated like children, for you will have proved yourself such. Men know how to act. Let there be no more complaining of Englishmen being preferred to you in all important offices, for if you lack that public spirit, that highest form of altruistic devotion that leads men to subordinate private ease to the public weal – that patriotism that has made Englishmen what they are – then rightly are these preferred to you, rightly and inevitably have they become your rulers. And rulers and task-masters they must continue, let the yoke gall your shoulders never so sorely, until you realise and stand prepared to act upon the eternal truth that self-sacrifice and unselfishness are the only unfailing guides to freedom and happiness.

In 1886 he published a pamphlet The Old Man's Hope in which he examined poverty in India, questioning charity as a solution for the problem. Here he makes a case for Richard Cobden's Anti-Corn Law League as a model for the struggle in India through the formation of a representative body.

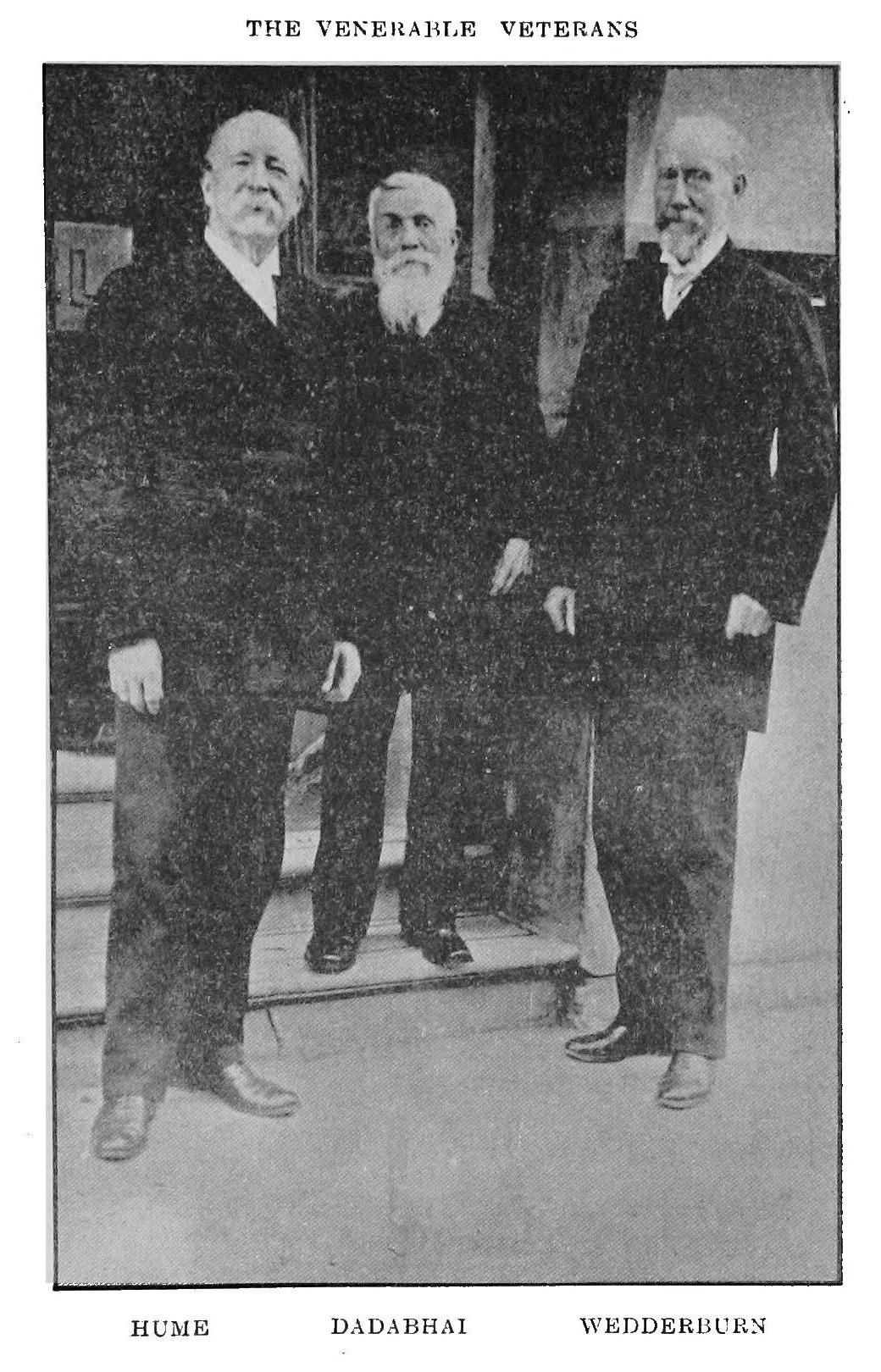
Hume (left) with Wedderburn (right) and Dadabhai Naoroji (centre)

His poem Awake published in Calcutta in 1886 also captures the sentiment:

Sons of Ind, why sit ye idle,
Wait ye for some Deva's aid?
Buckle to, be up and doing!
Nations by themselves are made!

Yours the land, lives, all, at stake, tho '
Not by you the cards are played;
Are ye dumb? Speak up and claim them!
By themselves are nations made!

What avail your wealth, your learning,
Empty titles, sordid trade?
True self-rule were worth them all!
Nations by themselves are made!

Whispered murmurs darkly creeping,
Hidden worms beneath the glade,
Not by such shall wrong be righted!
Nations by themselves are made!

Are ye Serfs or are ye Freemen,
Ye that grovel in the shade?
In your own hands rest the issues!
By themselves are nations made!

Sons of Ind, be up and doing,
Let your course by none be stayed;
Lo! the Dawn is in the East;
By themselves are nations made!

The idea of the Indian National Union took shape and Hume initially had some support from Lord Dufferin for this, although the latter wished to have no official link to it. Dufferin's support was short-lived and in some of his letters he went so far as to call Hume an "idiot", "arch-impostor", and "mischievous busy-body." Dufferin's successor Lansdowne refused to have any dialogue with Hume. Other supporters in England included James Caird (who had also clashed with Lytton over the management of famine in India) and John Bright. Hume also founded an Indian Telegraph Union to fund the transfer of news of Indian matters to newspapers in England and Scotland without interference from British Indian officials who controlled telegrams sent by Reuters. It has been suggested that the idea of the congress was originally conceived in a private meeting of seventeen men after a Theosophical Convention held at Madras in December 1884 but no evidence exists. Hume took the initiative, and it was in March 1885, when a notice was first issued to convene the first Indian National Union to meet at Poona the following December.

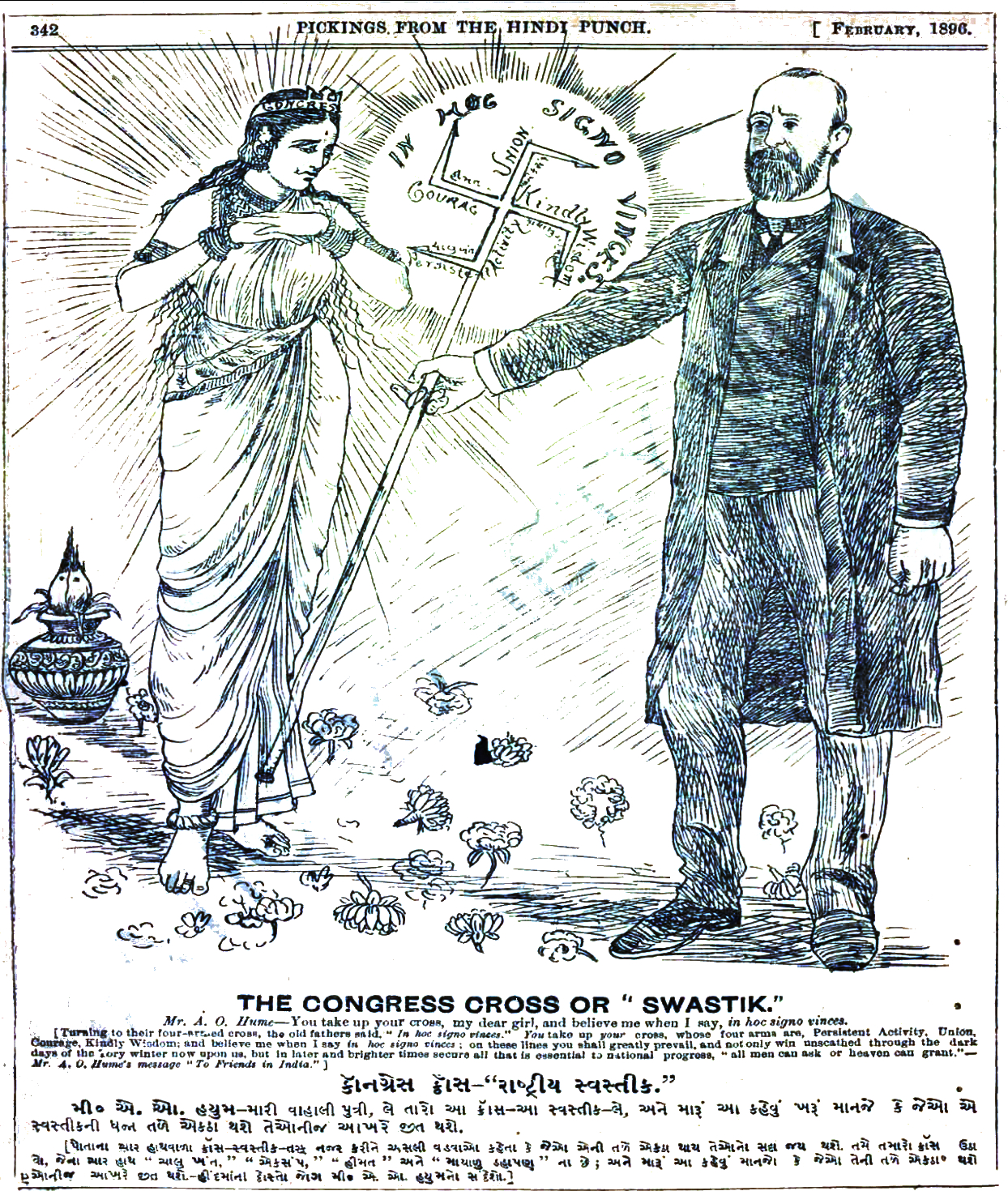
Cartoon from the Hindi Punch, 1896

He attempted to increase the Congress base by bringing in more farmers, townspeople and Muslims between 1886 and 1887 and this created a backlash from the British, leading to backtracking by the Congress. Hume was disappointed when Congress opposed moves to raise the age of marriage for Indian girls and failed to focus on issues of poverty. Some Indian princes did not like the idea of democracy and some organisations like the United Indian Patriotic Association went about trying to undermine the Congress by showing it as an organisation with a seditious character. There was also major rifts along religious lines within the Congress on issues such as the Age of Consent Bill. In 1892, he tried to get the members to act, warning of a violent agrarian revolution but this only outraged the British establishment and frightened the Congress leaders. Disappointed by the continued lack of Indian leaders willing to work for the cause of national emancipation, Hume left India in 1894.

Many Anglo-Indians were against the idea of the Indian National Congress. The press in India tended to look upon it negatively, so much so that Hume is said to have held a very low opinion of journalists even later in life. A satirical work on native rule, India in 1983, published (anonymously but thought to be written by T. Hart Davies) in 1888 included a character derisively called "A. O. Humebogue".

The organisers of the 27th session of the Indian National Congress at Bankipur (26–28 December 1912) recorded their "profound sorrow at the death of Allan Octavian Hume, C.B., father and founder of the Congress, to whose lifelong services, rendered at rare self-sacrifice, India feels deep and lasting gratitude, and in whose death the cause of Indian progress and reform sustained irreparable loss."

== Contribution to ornithology and natural history ==
From early days, Hume had a special interest in science. Science, he wrote:

...teaches men to take an interest in things outside and beyond... The gratification of the animal instinct and the sordid and selfish cares of worldly advancement; it teaches a love of truth for its own sake and leads to a purely disinterested exercise of intellectual faculties

and of natural history he wrote in 1867:

... alike to young and old, the study of Natural History in all its branches offers, next to religion, the most powerful safeguard against those worldly temptations to which all ages are exposed. There is no department of natural science the faithful study of which does not leave us with juster and loftier views of the greatness, goodness, and wisdom of the Creator, that does not leave us less selfish and less worldly, less spiritually choked up with those devil's thorns, the love of dissipation, wealth, power, and place, that does not, in a word, leave us wiser, better and more useful to our fellow-men.

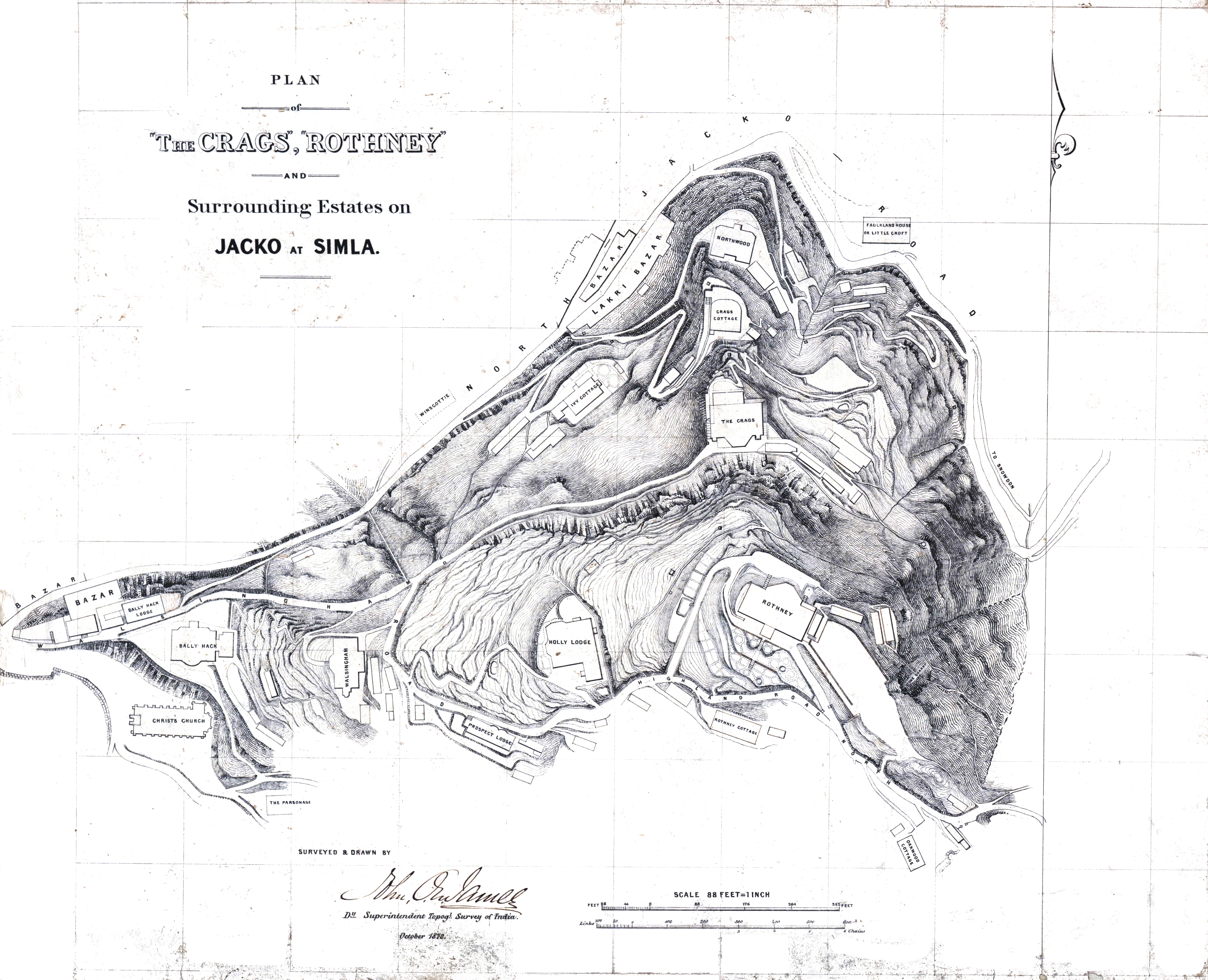
Map of the Crags and Rothney Castle, Shimla (1872)

During his career in Etawah, he built up a personal collection of bird specimens, however the first collection that he made was destroyed during the 1857 rebellion. After 1857 Hume made several expeditions to collect birds both on health leave and where work took him. He was Collector and Magistrate of Etawah from 1856 to 1867 during which time he studied the birds of that area. Around 1867 he transferred about 2500 specimens from his collection to a museum in Agra. His most systematic work however began after he moved to Shimla. He later became Commissioner of Inland Customs which made him responsible for the control of 2,500 miles (4,000 km) of coast from near Peshawar in the northwest to Cuttack on the Bay of Bengal. He travelled on horseback and camel in areas of Rajasthan to negotiate treaties with various local maharajas to control the export of salt, and during these travels he took note of the birdlife.

Hume appears to have planned a comprehensive work on the birds of India around 1870 and a "forthcoming comprehensive work" finds mention in the second edition of The Cyclopaedia of India (1871) by his cousin Edward Balfour. His systematic plan to survey and document the birds of the Indian Subcontinent began in earnest after he started accumulating the largest collection of Asiatic birds in his personal museum and library at home in Rothney Castle on Jakko Hill, Simla. Rothney Castle, originally Rothney House was built by Colonel Octavius Edward Rothney (1824–1881) and later owned by P. Mitchell, C.I.E. from whom Hume bought it and converted it into a palatial house with the hope that it might be bought by the Government as a Viceregal residence since the Governor-General then occupied Peterhoff, a building too small for large parties. Hume spent over two hundred thousand pounds on the grounds and buildings. He added enormous reception rooms suitable for large dinner parties and balls, as well as a magnificent conservatory and spacious hall with walls displaying his superb collection of Indian horns. He used a large room for his bird museum. He hired a European gardener, and made the grounds and conservatory a perpetual horticultural exhibition, to which he courteously admitted all visitors. Rothney Castle could only be reached by a steep road, and was never purchased by the British Government.

Hume made several expeditions almost solely to study ornithology, the largest being an expedition to the Indus area begun in late November 1871 and continued until the end of February 1872. He was assisted here by Sir W. Merewether and Francis Day. In March 1873, he visited the Andaman and Nicobar Islands in the Bay of Bengal along with geologists Dr. Ferdinand Stoliczka and Valentine Ball of the Geological Survey of India and James Wood-Mason of the Indian Museum in Calcutta. They were also accompanied by Surgeon-Major Joseph Dougall, medical superintendent at Port Blair, six native trappers-skinners, and supported by others like Jeremiah Nelson Homfray, superintendent of the Andaman orphanage. In 1875, he made an expedition to the Laccadive Islands aboard the marine survey vessel IGS Clyde under the command of Staff-Commander Ellis and accompanied by surgeon-naturalist James Armstrong of the Marine Survey. The official purpose of the visit was ostensibly to examine proposed sites for lighthouses. During this expedition Hume collected many bird specimens, apart from conducting a bathymetric survey to determine whether the island chain was separated from continental India by a deep canyon. And in 1881 he made his last ornithological expedition to Manipur, a visit in which he collected and described the Manipur bush quail (Perdicula manipurensis), a bird that has remained obscure with few reliable reports since. Hume spent an extra day with his assistants cutting down a large tract of grass so that he could obtain specimens of this species. This expedition was made on special leave following his demotion from the Central Government to a junior position on the Board of Revenue of the North Western Provinces. Apart from personal travel, he also sent out a trained bird-skinner to accompany officers travelling in areas of ornithological interest such as Afghanistan. Around 1878 he was spending about £1500 a year on his ornithological surveys.

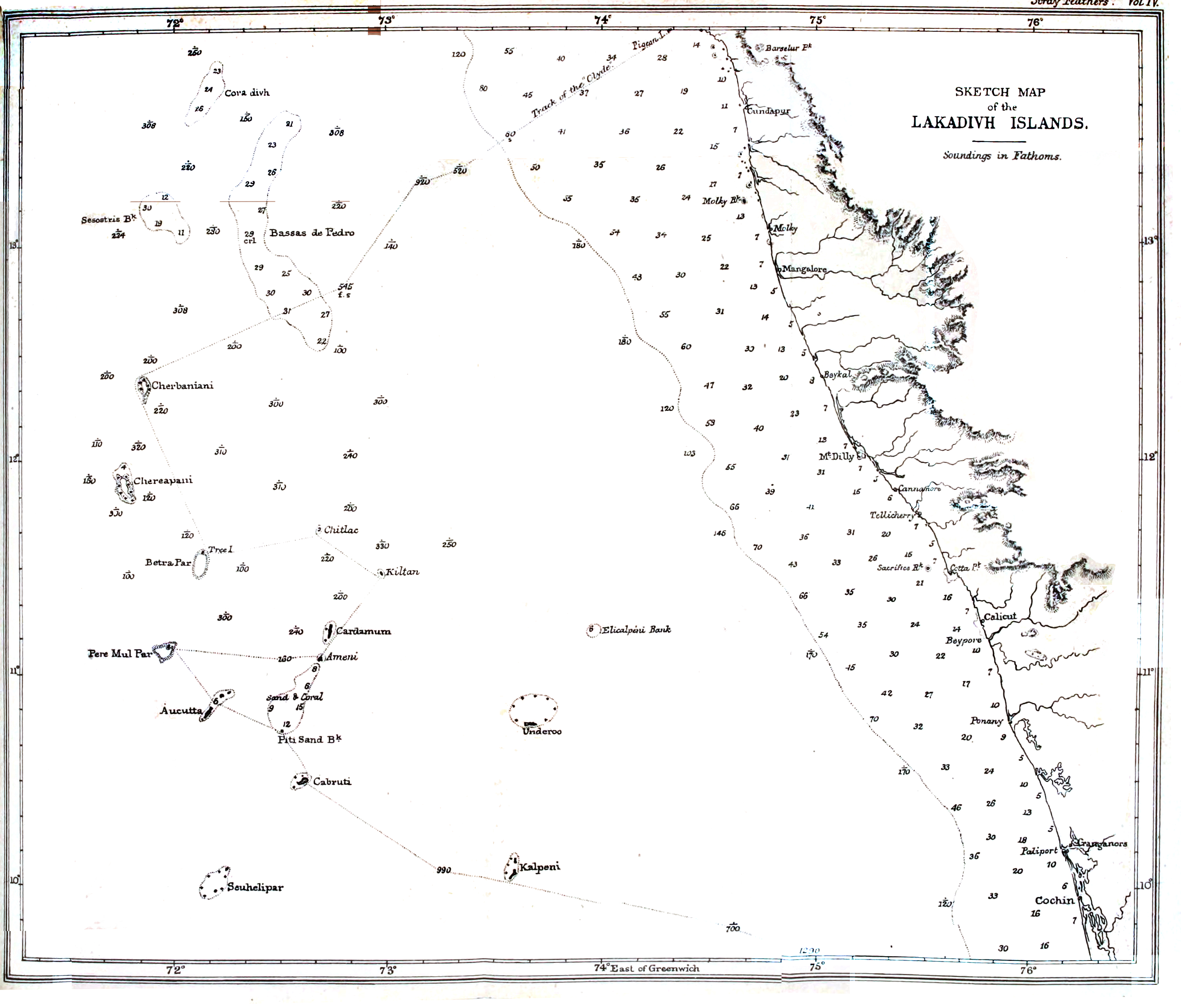
Hume's map of Lakshadweep with seabed depth contours

Hume was a member of the Asiatic Society of Bengal from January 1870 to 1891 and admitted Fellow of the Linnean Society on 3 November 1904. After returning to England in 1890 he also became president of the Dulwich Liberal and Radical Association.

=== Collection ===
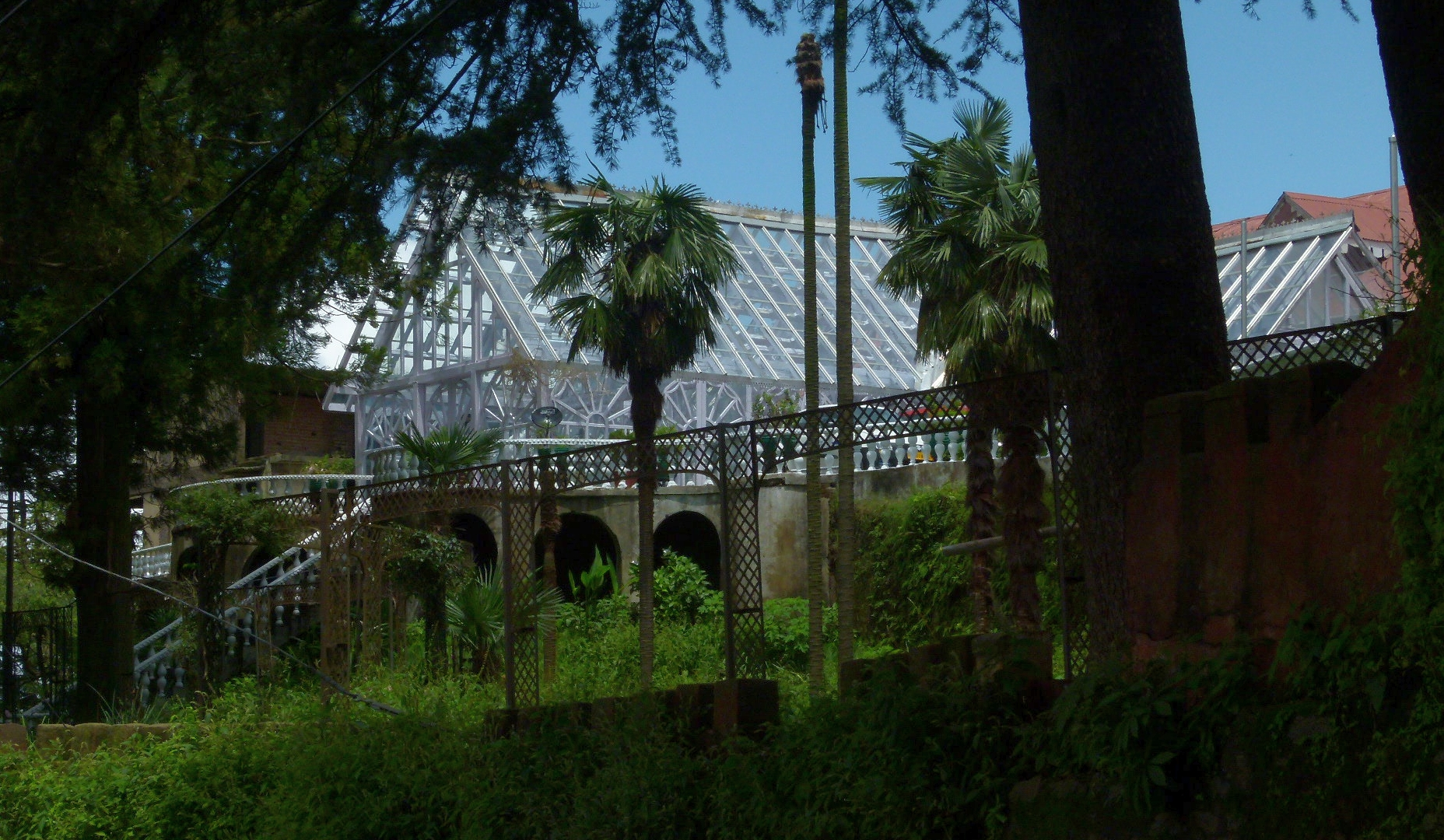
Rothney Castle, conservatory and facade in Shimla (2016).

Hume used his vast bird collection to good use as editor of his journal Stray Feathers. He also intended to produce a comprehensive publication on the birds of India. Hume employed William Ruxton Davison, who was brought to notice by Dr. George King, as a curator for his personal bird collection. Hume trained Davison and sent him out annually on collection trips to various parts of India as he himself was held up with official responsibilities. In 1883 Hume returned from a trip to find that many pages of the manuscripts that he had maintained over the years had been stolen and sold off as waste paper by a servant. Hume was completely devastated and he began to lose interest in ornithology due to this theft and a landslip, caused by heavy rains in Simla, which had damaged his museum and many of the specimens. He wrote to the British Museum wishing to donate his collection on certain conditions. One of the conditions was that the collection was to be examined by Dr. R. Bowdler Sharpe and personally packed by him, apart from raising Dr. Sharpe's rank and salary due to the additional burden on his work caused by his collection. The British Museum was unable to heed his many conditions. It was only in 1885, after the destruction of nearly 20,000 specimens, that alarm bells were raised by Dr. Sharpe and the museum authorities let him visit India to supervise the transfer of the specimens to the British Museum.

Sharpe visited Hume's private ornithological museum at home and oversaw the packing of specimens for England.: He noted later that:

Mr. Hume was a naturalist of no ordinary calibre, and this great collection will remain a monument of his genius and energy of its founder long after he who formed it has passed away...Such a private collection as Mr. Hume's is not likely to be formed again; for it is doubtful if such a combination of genius for organisation with energy for the completion of so great a scheme, and the scientific knowledge requisite for its proper development will again be combined in a single individual.

The Hume collection of birds was packed into 47 cases made of deodar wood constructed on site without nails that could potentially damage specimens and each case weighing about half a ton was transported down the hill to a bullock cart to Kalka and finally the port in Bombay. The material that went to the British Museum in 1885 consisted of 82,000 specimens of which 75,577 (258 being type specimens) were finally placed in the museum. A breakup of that collection is as follows (old names retained). Hume had destroyed 20,000 specimens prior to this as they had been damaged by dermestid beetles. In addition his donations included 223 game trophies and 371 mammal skins.

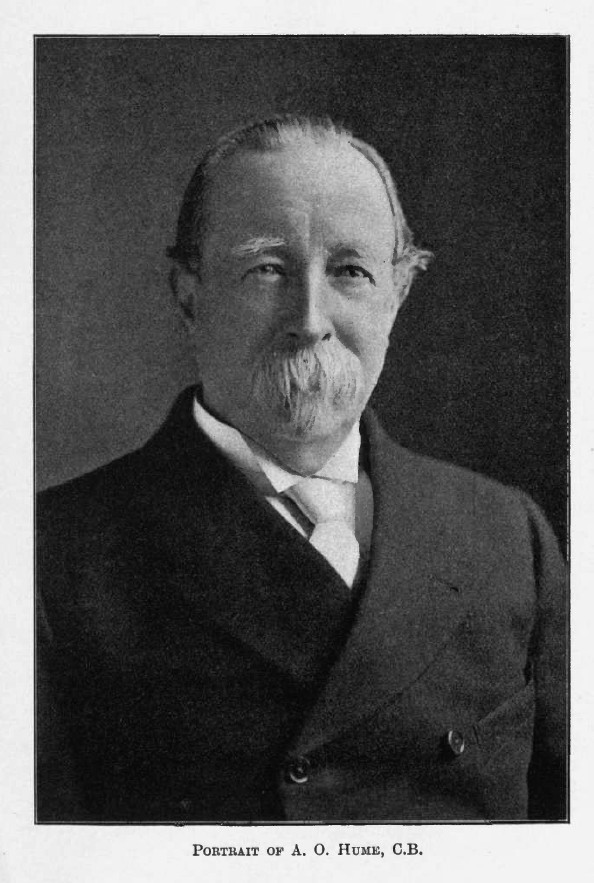

- 2830 birds of prey (Accipitriformes)... 8 types
- 1155 owls (Strigiformes)...9 types
- 2819 crows, jays, orioles etc....5 types
- 4493 cuckoo-shrikes and flycatchers... 21 types
- 4670 thrushes and warblers...28 types
- 3100 bulbuls and wrens, dippers, etc....16 types
- 7304 timaliine birds...30 types
- 2119 tits and shrikes...9 types
- 1789 sun-birds (Nectarinidae) and white-eyes (Zosteropidae)...8 types
- 3724 swallows (Hirundiniidae), wagtails and pipits (Motacillidae)...8 types
- 2375 finches (Fringillidae)...8 types
- 3766 starlings (Sturnidae), weaver-birds (Ploceidae), and larks (Alaudidae)...22 types
- 807 ant-thrushes (Pittidae), broadbills (Eurylaimidae)...4 types
- 1110 hoopoes (Upupae), swifts (Cypseli), nightjars (Caprimulgidae) and frogmouths (Podargidae)...8 types
- 2277 Picidae, hornbills (Bucerotes), bee-eaters (Meropes), kingfishers (Halcyones), rollers(Coracidae), trogons (trogones)...11 types
- 2339 woodpeckers (Pici)...3 types
- 2417 honey-guides (Indicatores), barbets (Capiformes), and cuckoos (Coccyges)...8 types
- 813 parrots (Psittaciformes)...3 types
- 1615 pigeons (Columbiformes)...5 types
- 2120 sand-grouse (Pterocletes), game-birds and megapodes(Galliformes)...8 types
- 882 rails (Ralliformes), cranes (Gruiformes), bustards (Otides)...6 types
- 1089 ibises (Ibididae), herons (Ardeidae), pelicans and cormorants (Steganopodes), grebes (Podicipediformes)...7 types
- 761 geese and ducks (Anseriformes)...2 types
- 15,965 eggs

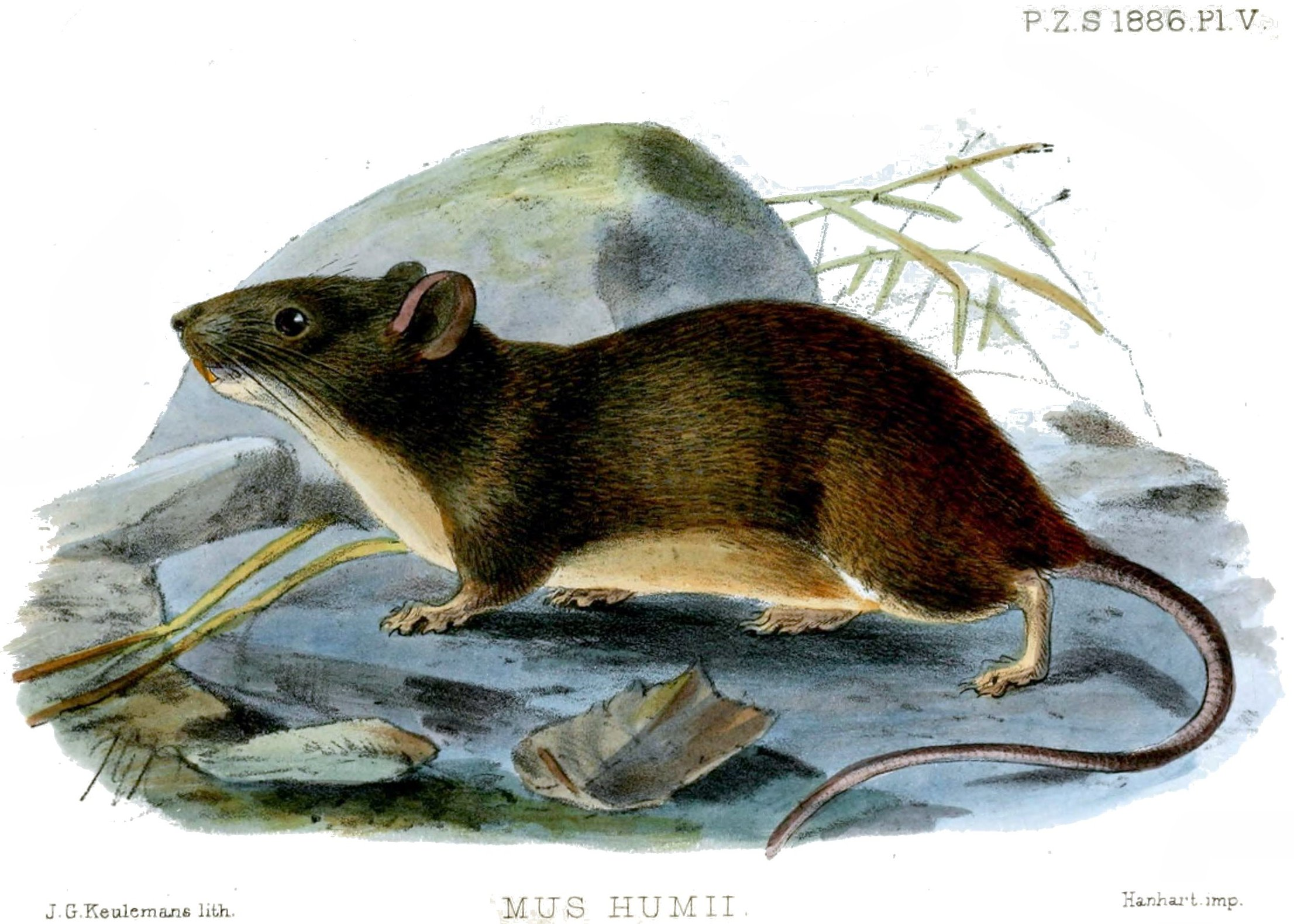
Hadromys humei

The Hume Collection contained 258 type specimens. In addition there were nearly 400 mammal specimens including new species such as Hadromys humei.

The egg collection was made up of carefully authenticated contributions from knowledgeable contacts and on the authenticity and importance of the collection, E. W. Oates noted in the 1901 Catalogue of the Collection of Birds' Eggs in the British Museum (Volume 1) that the collection was made up of specimens of known provenance and not accumulated through indiscriminate purchases as tended to be the case with many other collectors.

Hume and his collector Davison took an interest in plants as well. Specimens were collected even on the first expedition to the Lakshadweep in 1875 were studied by George King and later by David Prain. Hume's herbarium specimens were donated to the collection of the Botanical Survey of India at Calcutta.

=== Taxa described ===
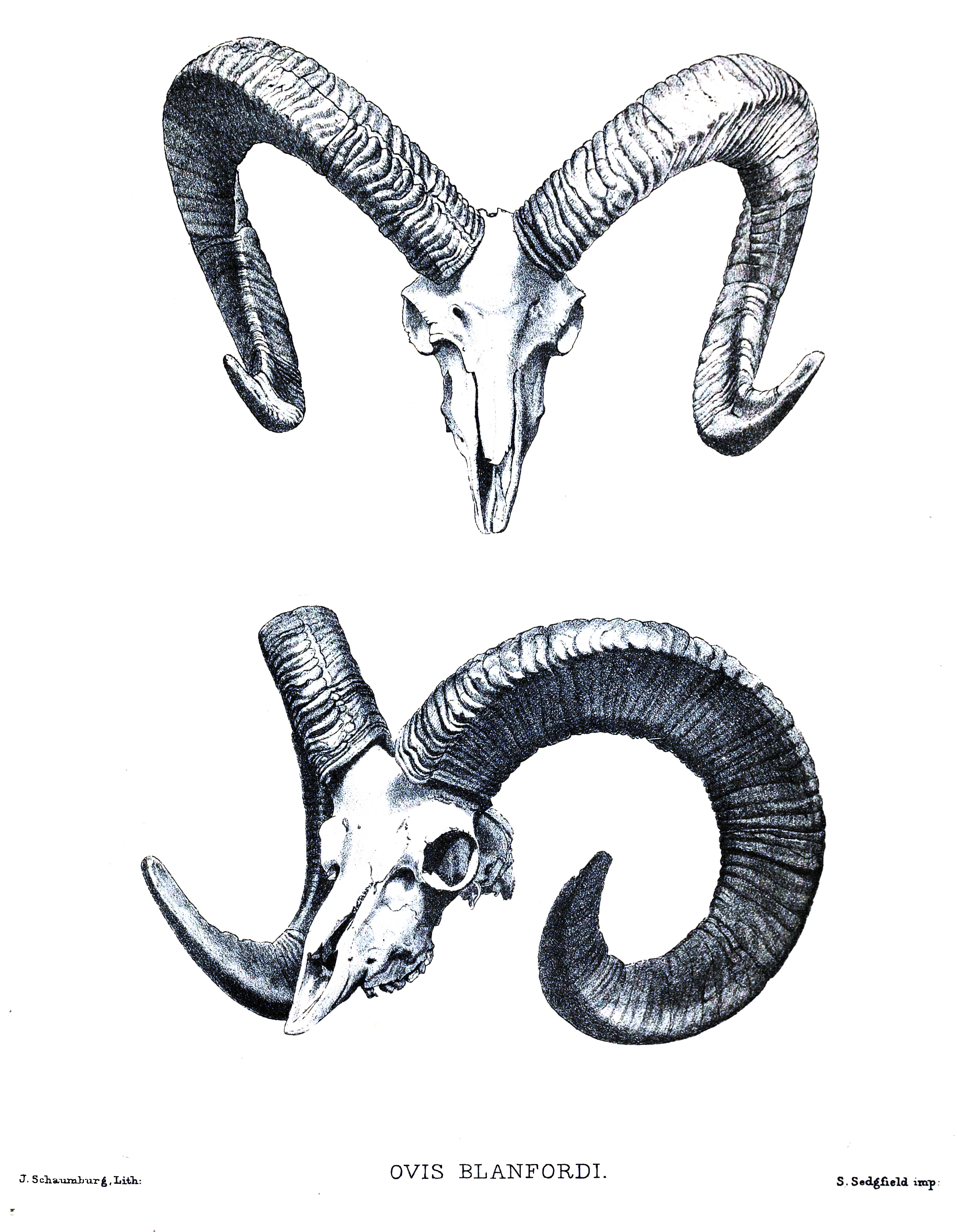
Ovis blanfordi Hume, 1877

Hume described many species, some of which are now considered as subspecies. A single genus name that he erected survives in use while others such as Heteroglaux Hume, 1873 have sunk into synonymy since. In addition to birds, he described a species of goat as Ovis blanfordi in 1877 based on a variation in the horns. It is now considered a variant of the urial (Ovis vignei). In his concept of species, Hume was an essentialist and held the idea that small but constant differences defined species. He appreciated the ideas of speciation and how it contradicted divine creation but preferred to maintain a position that did not reject a Creator.

Genera

- Ocyceros Hume, 1873

Species

- Anas albogularis (Hume, 1873)
- Perdicula manipurensis Hume, 1881
- Arborophila mandellii Hume, 1874
- Syrmaticus humiae (Hume, 1881)
- Puffinus persicus Hume, 1872
- Ardea insignis Hume, 1878
- Pseudibis davisoni (Hume, 1875)
- Gyps himalayensis Hume, 1869
- Spilornis minimus Hume, 1873
- Buteo burmanicus Hume, 1875
- Sternula saundersi (Hume, 1877)
- Columba palumboides (Hume, 1873)
- Phodilus assimilis Hume, 1877
- Otus balli (Hume, 1873)
- Otus brucei (Hume, 1872)
- Strix butleri (Hume, 1878)
- Heteroglaux blewitti Hume, 1873
- Ninox obscura Hume, 1872
- Tyto deroepstorffi (Hume, 1875)
- Caprimulgus andamanicus Hume, 1873
- Aerodramus maximus (Hume, 1878)
- Psittacula finschii (Hume, 1874)
- Hydrornis oatesi Hume, 1873
- Hydrornis gurneyi (Hume, 1875)
- Rhyticeros narcondami Hume, 1873
- Megalaima incognita Hume, 1874
- Podoces hendersoni Hume, 1871
- Podoces biddulphi Hume, 1874
- Pseudopodoces humilis (Hume, 1871)
- Mirafra microptera Hume, 1873
- Alcippe dubia (Hume, 1874)
- Stachyridopsis rufifrons (Hume, 1873)
- Cyornis olivaceus Hume, 1877
- Oenanthe albonigra (Hume, 1872)
- Dicaeum virescens Hume, 1873
- Pyrgilauda blanfordi (Hume, 1876)
- Ploceus megarhynchus Hume, 1869
- Spinus thibetanus (Hume, 1872)
- Carpodacus stoliczkae (Hume, 1874)
- Gampsorhynchus torquatus Hume, 1874
- Sylvia minula Hume, 1873
- Sylvia althaea Hume, 1878
- Phylloscopus neglectus Hume, 1870
- Horornis brunnescens (Hume, 1872)
- Yuhina humilis (Hume, 1877)
- Pteruthius intermedius (Hume, 1877)
- Certhia manipurensis Hume, 1881
- Calandrella acutirostris Hume, 1873
- Pycnonotus fuscoflavescens (Hume, 1873)
- Pycnonotus erythropthalmos (Hume, 1878)

Subspecies

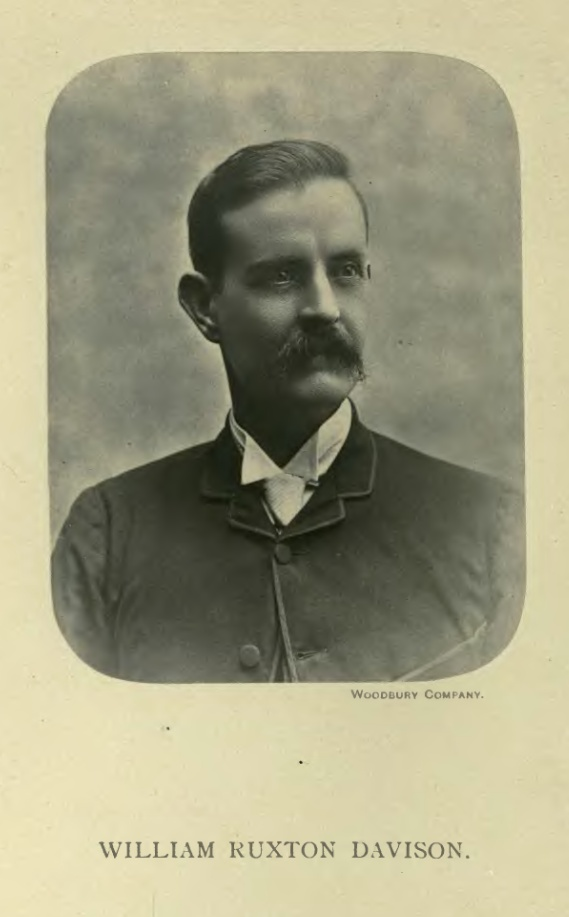
William Ruxton Davison, Curator of Hume's personal bird collection

The use of trinomials had not yet gone into regular usage during Hume's time. He used the term "local race". The following subspecies are current placements of taxa that were named as new species by Hume.

- Alectoris chukar pallida (Hume, 1873)
- Alectoris chukar pallescens (Hume, 1873)
- Francolinus francolinus melanonotus Hume, 1888
- Perdicula erythrorhyncha blewitti (Hume, 1874)
- Arborophila rufogularis tickelli (Hume, 1880)
- Phaethon aethereus indicus Hume, 1876
- Gyps fulvus fulvescens Hume, 1869
- Spilornis cheela davisoni Hume, 1873
- Accipiter badius poliopsis (Hume, 1874)
- Accipiter nisus melaschistos Hume, 1869
- Rallina eurizonoides telmatophila Hume, 1878
- Gallirallus striatus obscurior (Hume, 1874)
- Sterna dougallii korustes (Hume, 1874)
- Columba livia neglecta Hume, 1873
- Macropygia ruficeps assimilis Hume, 1874
- Centropus sinensis intermedius (Hume, 1873)
- Otus spilocephalus huttoni (Hume, 1870)
- Otus lettia plumipes (Hume, 1870)
- Otus sunia nicobaricus (Hume, 1876)
- Bubo bubo hemachalanus Hume, 1873
- Strix leptogrammica ochrogenys (Hume, 1873)
- Strix leptogrammica maingayi (Hume, 1878)
- Athene brama pulchra Hume, 1873
- Ninox scutulata burmanica Hume, 1876
- Lyncornis macrotis bourdilloni Hume, 1875
- Caprimulgus europaeus unwini Hume, 1871
- Aerodramus brevirostris innominatus (Hume, 1873)
- Aerodramus fuciphagus inexpectatus (Hume, 1873)
- Hirundapus giganteus indicus (Hume, 1873)
- Lacedo pulchella amabilis (Hume, 1873)
- Pelargopsis capensis intermedia Hume, 1874
- Halcyon smyrnensis saturatior Hume, 1874
- Megalaima asiatica davisoni Hume, 1877
- Dendrocopos cathpharius pyrrhothorax (Hume, 1881)
- Picus erythropygius nigrigenis (Hume, 1874)
- Falco cherrug hendersoni Hume, 1871
- Pericrocotus brevirostris neglectus Hume, 1877
- Pericrocotus speciosus flammifer Hume, 1875
- Dicrurus andamanensis dicruriformis (Hume, 1873)
- Rhipidura aureola burmanica (Hume, 1880)
- Garrulus glandarius leucotis Hume, 1874
- Dendrocitta formosae assimilis Hume, 1877
- Corvus splendens insolens Hume, 1874
- Corvus corax laurencei Hume, 1873
- Coracina melaschistos intermedia (Hume, 1877)
- Coracina fimbriata neglecta (Hume, 1877)
- Remiz coronatus stoliczkae (Hume, 1874)
- Alauda arvensis dulcivox Hume, 1872
- Alaudala raytal adamsi (Hume, 1871)
- Galerida cristata magna Hume, 1871
- Pycnonotus squamatus webberi (Hume, 1879)
- Pycnonotus finlaysoni davisoni (Hume, 1875)
- Alophoixus pallidus griseiceps (Hume, 1873)
- Hemixos flavala hildebrandi Hume, 1874
- Hemixos flavala davisoni Hume, 1877
- Ptyonoprogne obsoleta pallida Hume, 1872
- Aegithalos concinnus manipurensis (Hume, 1888)
- Leptopoecile sophiae stoliczkae (Hume, 1874)
- Prinia crinigera striatula (Hume, 1873)
- Prinia inornata terricolor (Hume, 1874)
- Prinia sylvatica insignis (Hume, 1872)
- Orthotomus atrogularis nitidus Hume, 1874
- Rhopocichla atriceps bourdilloni (Hume, 1876)
- Pomatorhinus hypoleucos tickelli Hume, 1877
- Pomatorhinus horsfieldii obscurus Hume, 1872
- Pomatorhinus ochraceiceps austeni Hume, 1881
- Stachyridopsis rufifrons poliogaster (Hume, 1880)
- Alcippe poioicephala brucei Hume, 1870
- Pellorneum albiventre ignotum Hume, 1877
- Pellorneum ruficeps minus Hume, 1873
- Turdoides caudata eclipes (Hume, 1877)
- Garrulax caerulatus subcaerulatus Hume, 1878
- Trochalopteron chrysopterum erythrolaemum Hume, 1881
- Trochalopteron variegatum simile Hume, 1871
- Minla cyanouroptera sordida (Hume, 1877)
- Minla strigula castanicauda (Hume, 1877)
- Heterophasia annectans davisoni (Hume, 1877)
- Chrysomma altirostre griseigulare (Hume, 1877)
- Rhopophilus pekinensis albosuperciliaris (Hume, 1873)
- Zosterops palpebrosus auriventer Hume, 1878
- Yuhina castaniceps rufigenis (Hume, 1877)
- Aplonis panayensis tytleri (Hume, 1873)
- Sturnus vulgaris nobilior Hume, 1879
- Sturnus vulgaris minor Hume, 1873
- Copsychus saularis andamanensis Hume, 1874
- Anthipes solitaris submoniliger Hume, 1877
- Cyornis concretus cyaneus (Hume, 1877)
- Ficedula tricolor minuta (Hume, 1872)
- Myophonus caeruleus eugenei Hume, 1873
- Geokichla sibirica davisoni (Hume, 1877)
- Dicaeum agile modestum (Hume, 1875)
- Cinnyris asiaticus intermedius (Hume, 1870)
- Cinnyris jugularis andamanicus (Hume, 1873)
- Aethopyga siparaja cara Hume, 1874
- Aethopyga siparaja nicobarica Hume, 1873
- Passer ammodendri stoliczkae Hume, 1874
- Lonchura striata semistriata (Hume, 1874)
- Lonchura kelaarti jerdoni (Hume, 1874)
- Linaria flavirostris montanella (Hume, 1873)

An additional species, the large-billed reed-warbler Acrocephalus orinus was known from just one specimen collected by him in 1869 but the name that he used, magnirostris, was found to be preoccupied and replaced by the name orinus provided by Harry Oberholser in 1905. The status of the species was contested until DNA comparisons with similar species in 2002 suggested that it was a valid species. It was only in 2006 that the species was seen in the wild in Thailand, with a match to the specimens confirmed using DNA sequencing. Later searches in museums led to several other specimens that had been overlooked and based on the specimen localities, a breeding region was located in Tajikistan and documented in 2011.

=== Standard abbreviation in zoology ===
He is abbreiated in zoology publications as Hume.

=== My Scrap Book: Or Rough Notes on Indian Oology and Ornithology (1869) ===
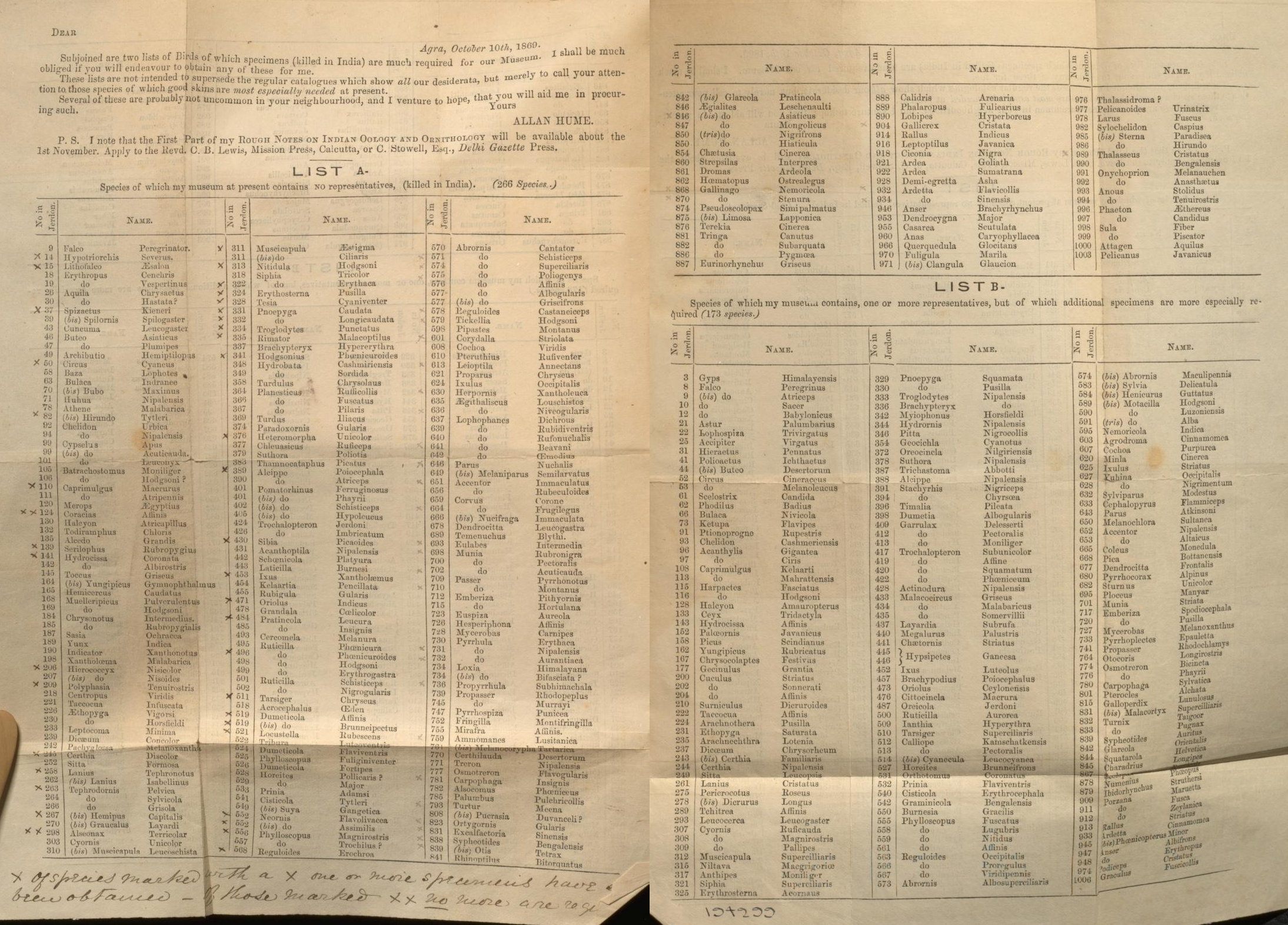
Hume's 1869 desiderata or list of bird species for which he sought specimens – supplied on request.

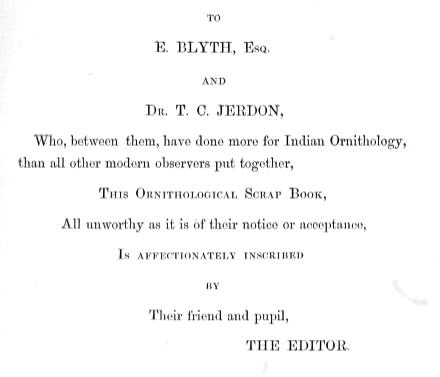
Dedication of "My Scrap Book" to Blyth and Jerdon.

This was Hume's first major work on birds. It had 422 pages and accounts of 81 species. It was dedicated to Edward Blyth and Dr. Thomas C. Jerdon who, he wrote "[had] done more for Indian Ornithology than all other modern observers put together" and he described himself as "their friend and pupil". He hoped that his collation, which he noted as being of a poor quality, would form a "nucleus round which future observation may crystallise" and that others around the country could help him "fill in many of the woeful blanks remaining in record". He offered to supply anyone interested with a list of species for which more information was needed and noted that Ceylon and Burma were major geographical gaps as he had no correspondents from there.

Hume was a careful reader of the ornithological literature and routinely communicated on them. In 1875 he noted that Friedrich Wilhelm Meves had confirmed through chemical analysis that the brown coloration of lammergeiers was due to an external deposition of iron-oxide. Hume wrote in the Scrap Book and commented on Meves' theory that the source may have been blood rather than through bathing in iron-rich water. Hume had repeated the chemical analysis and confirmed the presence of iron.

=== Stray Feathers ===
Hume started the quarterly journal Stray Feathers in 1872. At that time the only journal for the Indian region that published on ornithology was the Journal of the Asiatic Society of Bengal and Hume published only two letters in 1870, mainly being a list of errors in the list of Godwin-Austen which had been reduced to an abstract. Several other papers that he submitted to the Ibis had not been published and delays in post were common. In his preface he also examined if there was merit to start a new journal and in that idea was supported by Stoliczka, who was also an editor for the Journal of the Asiatic Society:

To return; the notion that Stray Feathers might possibly interfere in any way with our scientific palladium, the Journal of the Asiatic Society of Bengal, is much like that entertained in England, when I was a boy, as to the probable effects of Railways on road and canal traffic.

— Hume, 1874

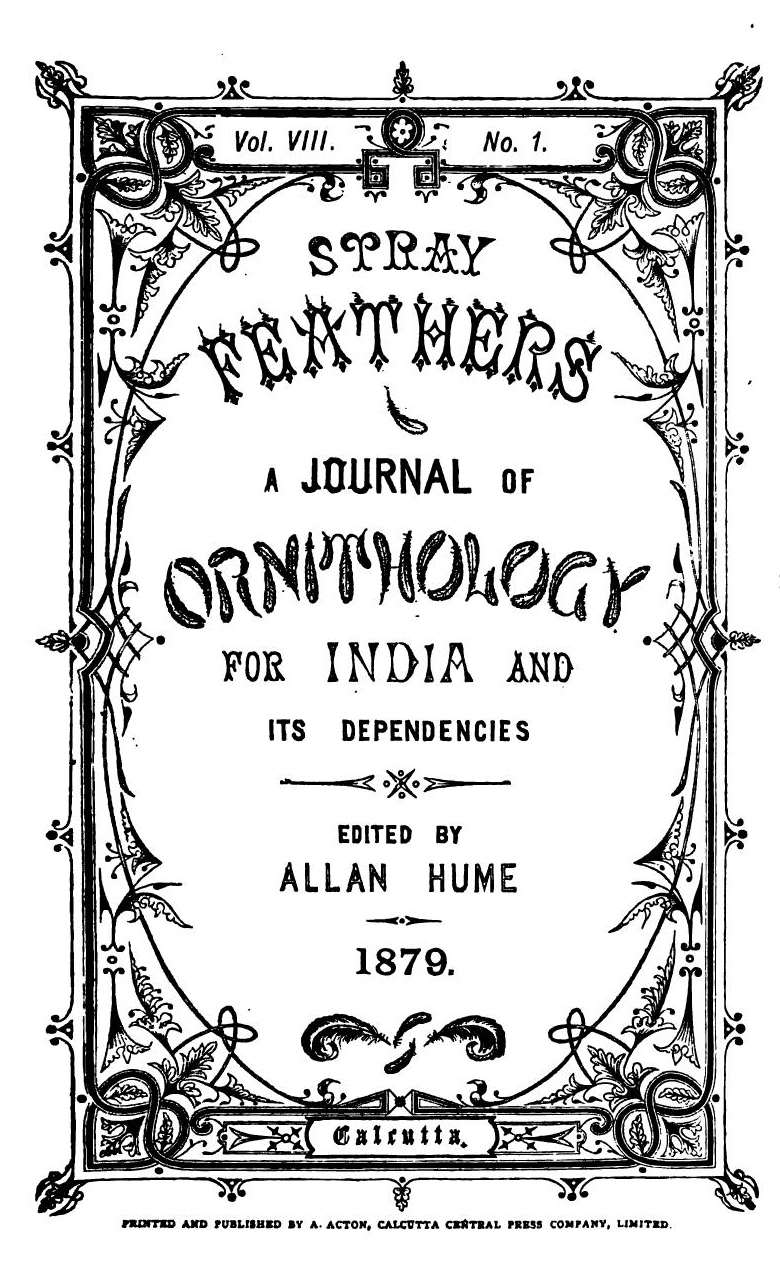
Cover of Stray Feathers

The President of the Asiatic Society of Bengal, Thomas Oldham, in the annual address for 1873 wrote – "We could have wished that the author had completed the several works which he had already commenced, rather than started a new publication. But we heartily welcome at the same time the issue of 'Stray Feathers.' It promises to be a useful catalogue of the Editor's very noble collection of Indian Birds, and a means of rapid publication of novelties or corrections, always of much value with ornithologists." Hume used the journal to publish descriptions of his new discoveries. He wrote extensively on his own observation as well as critical reviews of all the ornithological works of the time and earned himself the nickname of Pope of Indian ornithology. He critiqued a monograph on parrots, Die Papageien by Friedrich Hermann Otto Finsch suggesting that name changes (by "cabinet naturalists") were aimed at claiming authority to species without the trouble of actually discovering them. He wrote:

Let us treat our author as he treats other people's species. "Finsch!" contrary to all rules of orthography! What is that "s" doing there? "Finch!" Dr. Fringilla, MIHI! Classich gebildetes wort!!

— Hume, 1874

Hume in turn was attacked, for instance by Viscount Walden, but Finsch became a friend and Hume named a species, Psittacula finschii, after him.

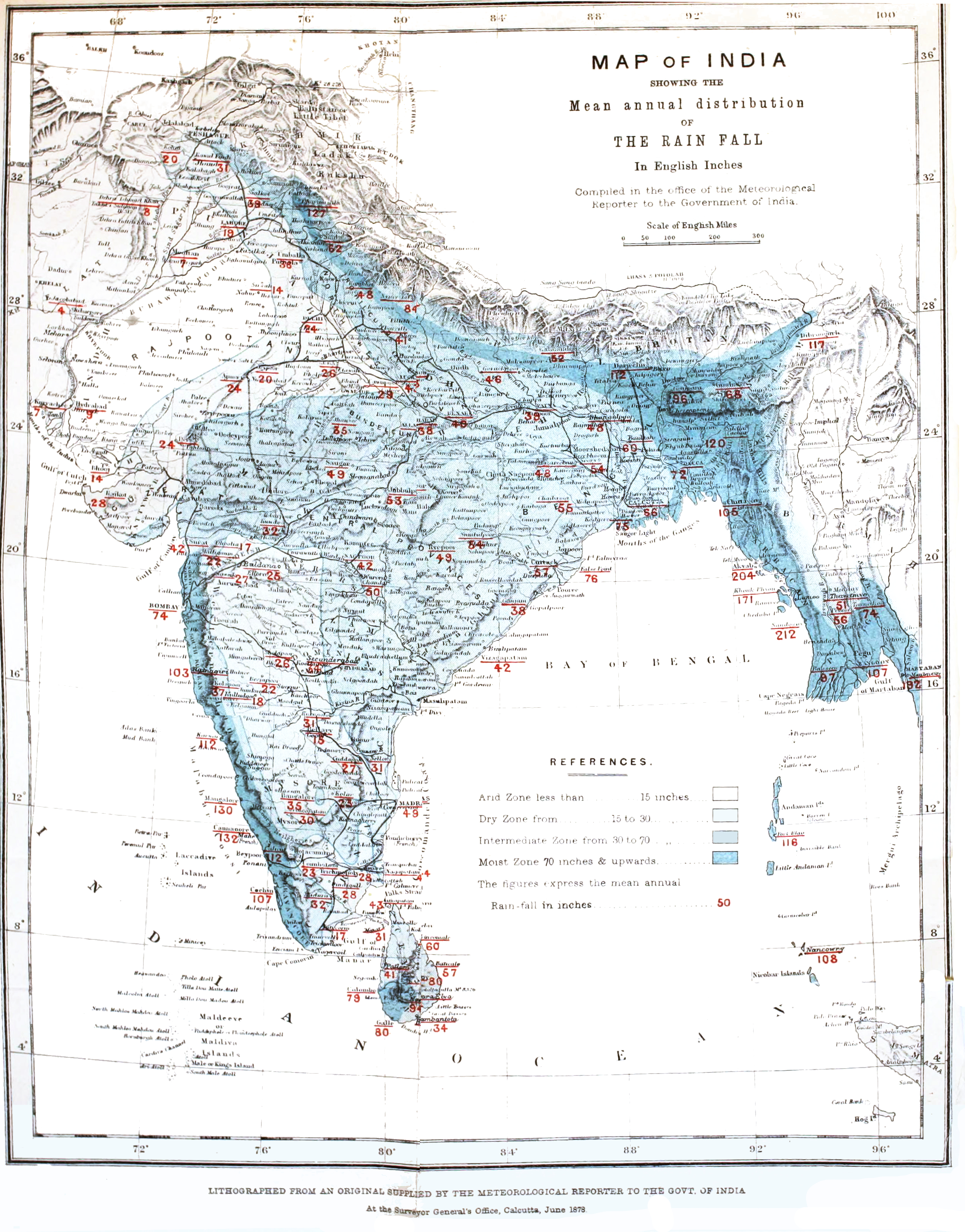
Hume was among the first to recognise an association between the avifaunal composition and rainfall distribution. This rainfall map was published in volume 8 of Stray Feathers (1878).

In his younger days Hume had studied some geology from the likes of Gideon Mantell and appreciated the synthesis of ideas from other fields into ornithology. Hume included in 1872, a detailed article on the osteology of birds in relation to their classification written by Richard Lydekker who was then in the Geological Survey of India. The early meteorological work in India was done within the department headed by Hume and he saw the value of meteorology in the study of bird distributions. In a work comparing the rainfall zones, he notes how the high rainfall zones indicated affinities to the Malayan fauna.

Hume sometimes mixed personal beliefs in notes that he published in Stray Feathers. For instance he believed that vultures soared by altering the physics ("altered polarity") of their body and repelling the force of gravity. He further noted that this ability was normal in birds and could be acquired by humans by maintaining spiritual purity, claiming that he knew of at least three Indian Yogis and numerous saints in the past with this ability of "aethrobacy".

=== Network of correspondents ===
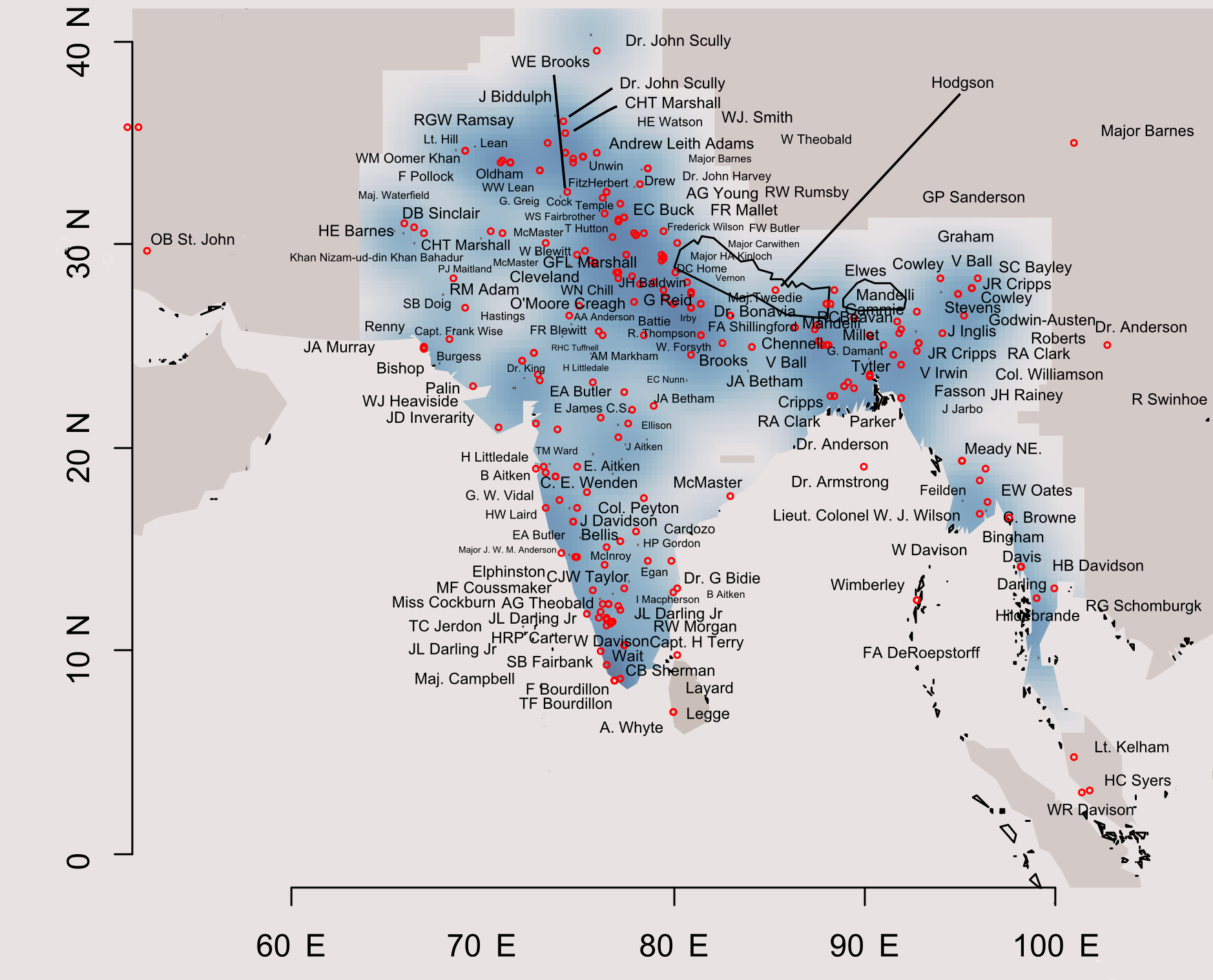
Distribution and density of Hume's correspondents across India.

Hume corresponded with a large number of ornithologists and sportsmen who helped him by reporting from various parts of India. More than 200 correspondents are listed in his Game Birds alone and they probably represent only a fraction of the subscribers of Stray Feathers. This large network made it possible for Hume to cover a much larger geographic region in his ornithological work.

During the lifetime of Hume, Blyth was considered the father of Indian ornithology. Hume's achievement which made use of a large network of correspondents was recognised even during his time. James Murray noted of Hume that "the palm is his as an authority above the rest" when it came to the birds of India and that all future work would be built upon his work.

Many of Hume's correspondents ("coadjutors" as he referred to them) were eminent naturalists and sportsmen who were posted in India.

- Leith Adams, Kashmir
- Lieut. H. E. Barnes, Afghanistan, Chaman, Rajpootana
- Captain R. C. Beavan, Maunbhoom District, Shimla, Mount Tongloo (1862)
- Colonel John Biddulph, Gilgit
- George Bidie, Madras
- Major C. T. Bingham, Thoungyeen Valley, Burma, Tenasserim, Moulmein, Allahabad
- W. Blanford
- Edward Blyth
- Dr. Emmanuel Bonavia, Lucknow
- W. Edwin Brooks (father of Allan Brooks, the Canadian bird artist)
- Sir Edward Charles Buck, Gowra, Hatu, near Narkanda (in Himachal Pradesh), Narkanda, (about 30 miles (48 km) north of Shimla)
- Captain Boughey Burgess, Ahmednagar (1822-1897)
- Colonel E. A. Butler, Belgaum (1880), Karachi, Deesa, Abu
- Miss Cockburn (1829–1928), Kotagiri
- Sir O'Moore Creagh, Ajmer
- James Davidson, Satara and Sholapur districts, Khandeish, Kondabhari Ghat
- Colonel Godwin-Austen, Shillong, Umian valley, Assam
- Brian Hodgson, Nepal
- Duncan Charles Home, 'Hero of the Kashmir Gate' (Bulandshahr, Aligarh)
- John Duncan Inverarity, barrister, Bombay
- T. C. Jerdon, Tellicherry
- Harold Littledale, Baroda college
- Colonel C. H. T. Marshall, Bhawulpoor, Murree
- Colonel G. F. L. Marshall, Nainital, Bhim tal
- James A. Murray, Karachi Museum
- Eugene Oates, Thayetmo, Tounghoo, Pegu
- Captain Robert George Wardlaw Ramsay, Afghanistan, Karenee hills
- Frederik Adolph de Roepstorff, Andaman and Nicobar Islands
- G. P. Sanderson (Chittagong)
- Major and later Sir O. B. St. John, Shiraz, Persia
- Ferdinand Stoliczka, geologist
- Robert Swinhoe, Hong Kong
- Charles Swinhoe, S. Afghanistan
- Colonel Samuel Tickell
- Colonel Robert Christopher Tytler, Dacca, 1852
- Valentine Ball, Rajmahal hills, Subanrika (Subansiri)
- Richard Lydekker, geologist
- G. W. Vidal, civil servant in South Konkan, Bombay
- Frederick "Mountaineer" Wilson, Gangothri

Hume exchanged skins with other collectors. A collection made principally by Hume that belonged to the Earl of Northbrook was gifted to Oxford University in 1877. One of his correspondents, Louis Mandelli from Darjeeling, stands out by claiming that he was swindled in these skin exchanges. He claimed that Hume took skins of rarer species in exchange for the skins of common birds but the credibility of the complaint has been doubted. Hume named Arborophila mandelli after Mandelli in 1874. The only other naturalist to question Hume's veracity was A.L. Butler who met a Nicobar islander whom Hume had described as diving nearly stark naked and capturing fish with his bare hands. Butler found the man in denial of such fishing techniques.

Hume corresponded and stayed up to date with the works of ornithologists outside India including R. Bowdler Sharpe, the Marquis of Tweeddale, Père David, Henry Eeles Dresser, Benedykt Dybowski, John Henry Gurney, J. H. Gurney, Jr., Johann Friedrich Naumann, Nikolai Severtzov and Dr. Aleksandr Middendorff. He helped George Ernest Shelley with specimens from India aiding the publication of a monograph on the sunbirds of the world (1876–1880).

=== Collector's Vade Mecum (1874) ===
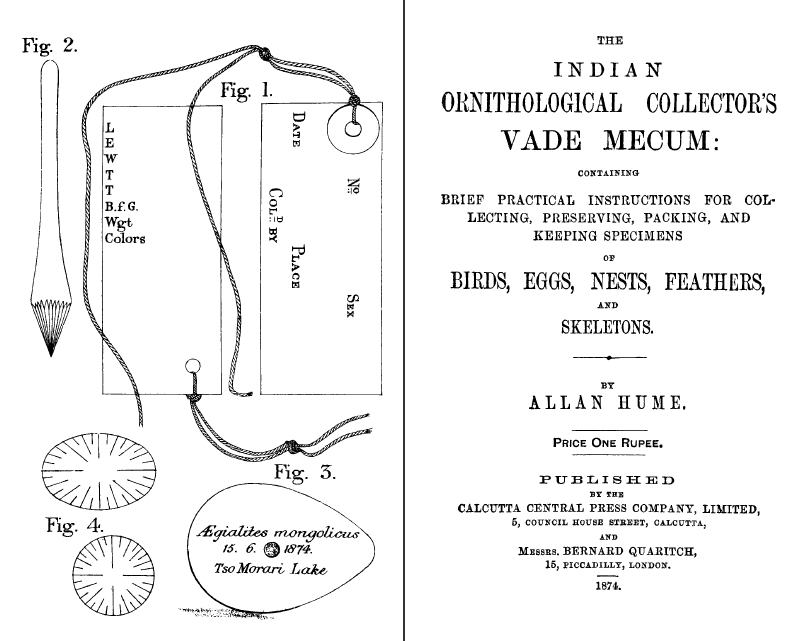
The Indian Ornithological Collector's Vade Mecum: containing brief practical instructions for collecting, preserving, packing and keeping specimens of birds, eggs, nests, feathers, and skeleton (1874)

Hume's vast collection from across India was possible because he began to correspond with coadjutors across India. He ensured that these contributors made accurate notes, and obtained and processed specimens carefully. The Vade Mecum was published to save him the trouble of sending notes to potential collaborators who sought advice. Materials for preservation are carefully tailored for India with the provision of the local names for ingredients and methods to prepare glues and preservatives with easy to find equipment. Apart from skinning and preservation, the book also covers matters of observation, keeping records, the use of natives to capture birds, obtain eggs and the care needed in obtaining other information apart from care in labelling.

=== Game Birds of India, Burmah and Ceylon (1879–1881) ===
This work was co-authored by C. H. T. Marshall. The three volume work on the game birds was made using contributions and notes from a network of 200 or more correspondents. Hume delegated the task of getting the plates made to Marshall. The chromolithographs of the birds were drawn by W. Foster, E. Neale, (Miss) M. Herbert, Stanley Wilson and others and the plates were produced by F. Waller in London. Hume had sent specific notes on colours of soft parts and instructions to the artists. He was dissatisfied with many of the plates and included additional notes on the plates in the book. This book was started at the point when the government demoted Hume and only the need to finance the publication of this book prevented him from retiring from service. He had estimated that it would cost £4000 to publish it and he retired from service on 1 January 1882 after the publication.

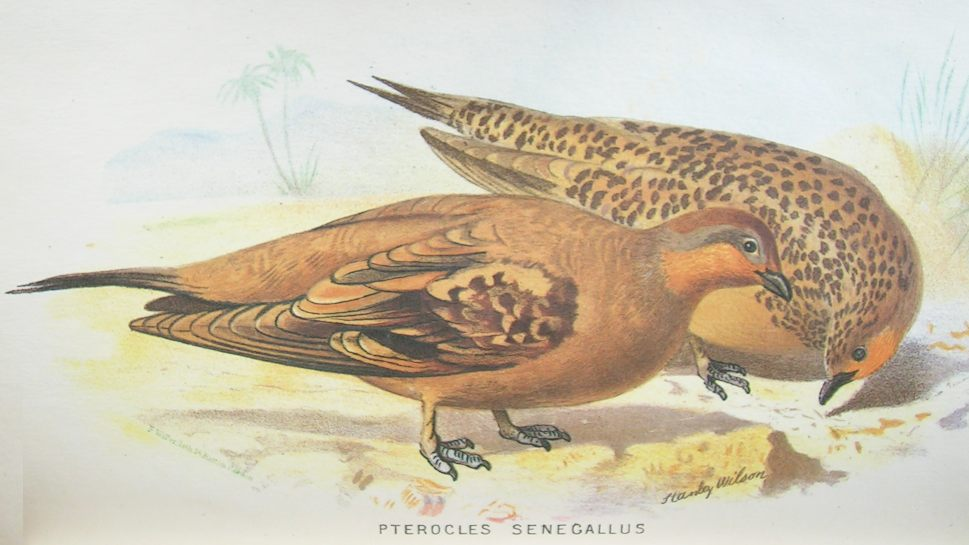
Hume's comment on the illustration The plate is a cruel caricature of the species, just sufficiently like to permit of identification, but miscolored to a degree only explicable on the hypothesis of somebody's colour-blindness... Fortunately for our supporters, this is the very worst plate in the three volumes.

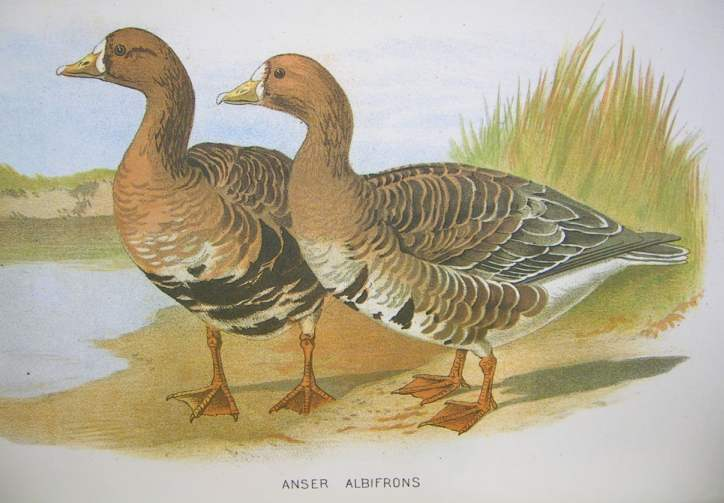
White-fronted goose One of the illustrations that Hume considered as exceptionally good.

=== Nests and Eggs of Indian Birds (1883) ===
This was another major work by Hume and in it he covered descriptions of the nests, eggs and the breeding seasons of most Indian bird species. It makes use of notes from contributors to his journals as well as other correspondents and works of the time. Hume also makes insightful notes such as observations on caged females separated from males that would continue to lay fertile eggs through the possibility of sperm storage and the reduction in parental care by birds that laid eggs in warm locations (mynas in the Andamans, river terns on sand banks).

A second edition of this book was made in 1889 which was edited by Eugene William Oates. This was published when he had himself given up all interest in ornithology, an event precipitated by the loss of his manuscripts through the actions of a servant.

He wrote in the preface:

I have long regretted my inability to issue a revised edition of 'Nests and Eggs'. For many years after the first Rough Draft appeared, I went on laboriously accumulating materials for a re-issue, but subsequently circumstances prevented my undertaking the work. Now, fortunately, my friend Mr. Eugene Oates has taken the matter up... One thing seems necessary to explain. The present Edition does not include quite all the materials I had accumulated for this work. Many years ago, during my absence from Simla, a servant broke into my museum and stole thence several cwts. of manuscript, which he sold as waste paper. This manuscript included more or less complete life-histories of some 700 species of birds, and also a certain number of detailed accounts of nidification. All small notes on slips of paper were left, but almost every article written on full-sized foolscap sheets was abstracted. It was not for many months that the theft was discovered, and then very little of the MSS. could be recovered.

— Rothney Castle, Simla, October 19th, 1889

This nearly marked the end of Hume's interest in ornithology. Hume's last piece of ornithological writing was part of an Introduction to the Scientific Results of the Second Yarkand Mission in 1891, an official publication on the contributions of Dr. Ferdinand Stoliczka, who died during the return journey on this mission. Stoliczka in a dying request had asked that Hume edit the volume on ornithology.

=== Taxa named after Hume ===
A number of birds are named after Hume, including:

- Hume's ground tit, Pseudopodoces humilis
- Hume's wheatear, Oenanthe albonigra
- Hume's boobook, Ninox obscura
- Hume's short-toed lark, Calandrella acutirostris
- Hume's leaf warbler, Phylloscopus humei
- Hume's whitethroat, Sylvia althaea
- Hume's treecreeper, Certhia manipurensis

Specimens of other animal groups collected by Hume on his expeditions and named after him include the Manipur bush rat, Hadromys humei (Thomas, 1886) while some others like Hylaeocarcinus humei, a land crab from the Narcondam Island collected by Hume was described by James Wood-Mason, and Hume's argali, Ovis ammon humei Lydekker 1913 (now treated as Ovis ammon karelini, Severtzov, 1873) are no longer considered valid.

== Theosophy ==
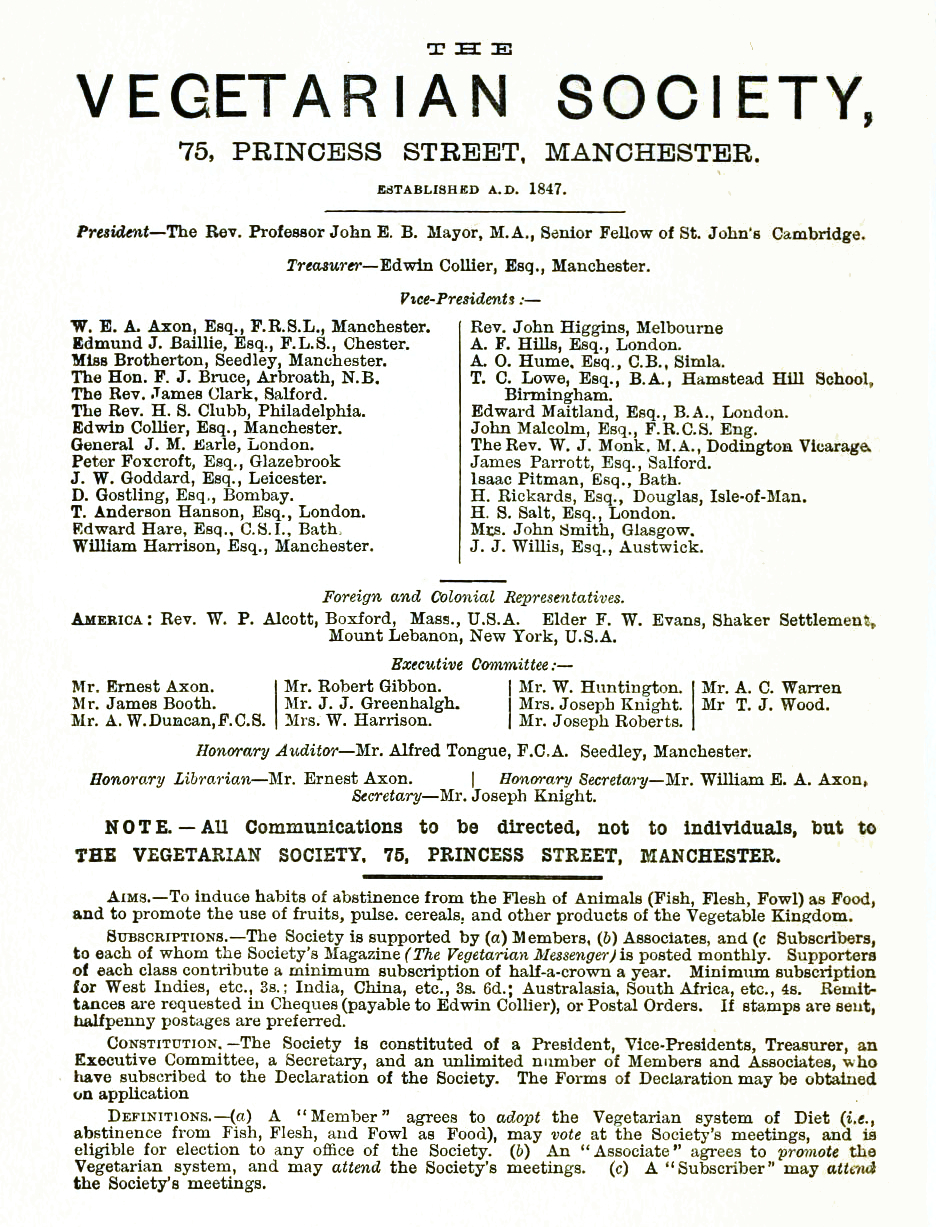
A vice-president of the Vegetarian Society

Hume's interest in theosophy took root around 1879. An 1880 newspaper reports the initiation of his daughter and wife into the movement. Hume did not have great regard for institutional Christianity, but believed in the immortality of the soul and in the idea of a supreme ultimate. Hume wanted to become a chela (student) of the Tibetan spiritual gurus. During the few years of his connection with the Theosophical Society Hume wrote three articles on Fragments of Occult Truth under the pseudonym "H. X." published in The Theosophist. These were written in response to questions from Mr. W.H. Terry, an Australian Theosophist.

He also privately printed several Theosophical pamphlets titled Hints on Esoteric Theosophy. The later numbers of the Fragments, in answer to the same enquirer, were written by A.P. Sinnett and signed by him, as authorised by Mahatma K. H., A Lay-Chela. Hume also wrote under the pseudonym "Aletheia".

Madame Blavatsky was a regular visitor at Hume's Rothney castle at Simla and an account of her visit may be found in Simla, Past and Present by Edward John Buck (whose father Sir Edward Charles Buck succeeded Hume as secretary to the Revenue and Agricultural Department).

A long story about Hume and his wife appears in A.P. Sinnett's book The Occult World, and the synopsis was published in a local paper of India. The story relates how at a dinner party, Madame Blavatsky asked Mrs Hume if there was anything she wanted. She replied that there was a brooch, her mother had given her, that had gone out of her possession some time ago. Blavatsky said she would try to recover it through occult means. After some interlude, later that evening, the brooch was found in a garden, where the party was directed by Blavatsky. According to John Murdoch (1894), the brooch had been given by Mrs. Hume to her daughter who had given it to a man she admired. Blavatsky had happened to meet the man in Bombay and obtained the brooch in return for money. Blavatsky allegedly planted it in the garden before directing people to the location through what she claimed as occult techniques.

After the incident, Hume too had privately expressed grave doubts on the powers attributed to Madame Blavatsky. He subsequently held a meeting with some of the Indian members of the Theosophical Society and suggested that they join hands with him to force the resignation of Blavatsky and sixteen other members for their role as accomplices in fraud. Those present could however not agree to the idea of seeking the resignation of their founder. Hume also tried to write a book on the philosophical basis of Theosophy. His drafts were strongly disapproved by many of the key Theosophists. One ("K.H"=Koot Humi) wrote:

I dread the appearance in print of our philosophy as expounded by Mr. H. I read his three essays or chapters on God (?)cosmogony and glimpses of the origin of things in general, and had to cross out nearly all. He makes of us Agnostics!! We do not believe in God because so far, we have no proof, etc. This is preposterously ridiculous: if he publishes what I read, I will have H.P.B. or Djual Khool deny the whole thing; as I cannot permit our sacred philosophy to be so disfigured....

— "K.H." (p.304)

Hume soon fell out of favour with the Theosophists and lost all interest in the theosophical movement in 1883.

Hume's interest in theosophy brought him into contact with many independent Indian thinkers like Gopal Krishna Gokhale who also had nationalist ideas and this led to the idea of creating the Indian National Congress.

Hume's immersion into the theosophical movement led him to become a vegetarian and also to give up killing birds for their specimens.

== South London Botanical Institute ==
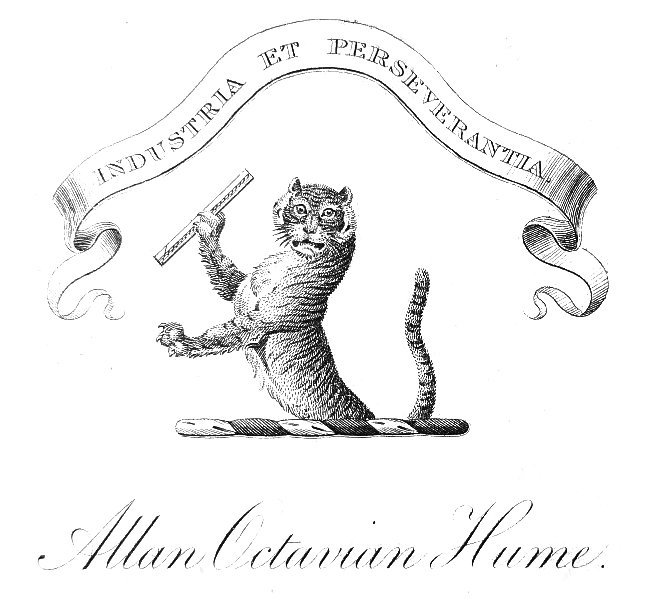
Bookplate of Hume with the motto Industria et Perseverantia

After the loss of his manuscript containing his lifetime of ornithological notes, Hume gave up ornithology and took great interest in horticulture around his home in Shimla.

... He erected large conservatories in the grounds of Rothney Castle, filled them with the choicest flowers, and engaged English gardeners to help him in the work. From this, on returning to England, he went on to scientific botany. But this, as Kipling says, is another story, and must be left to another pen.

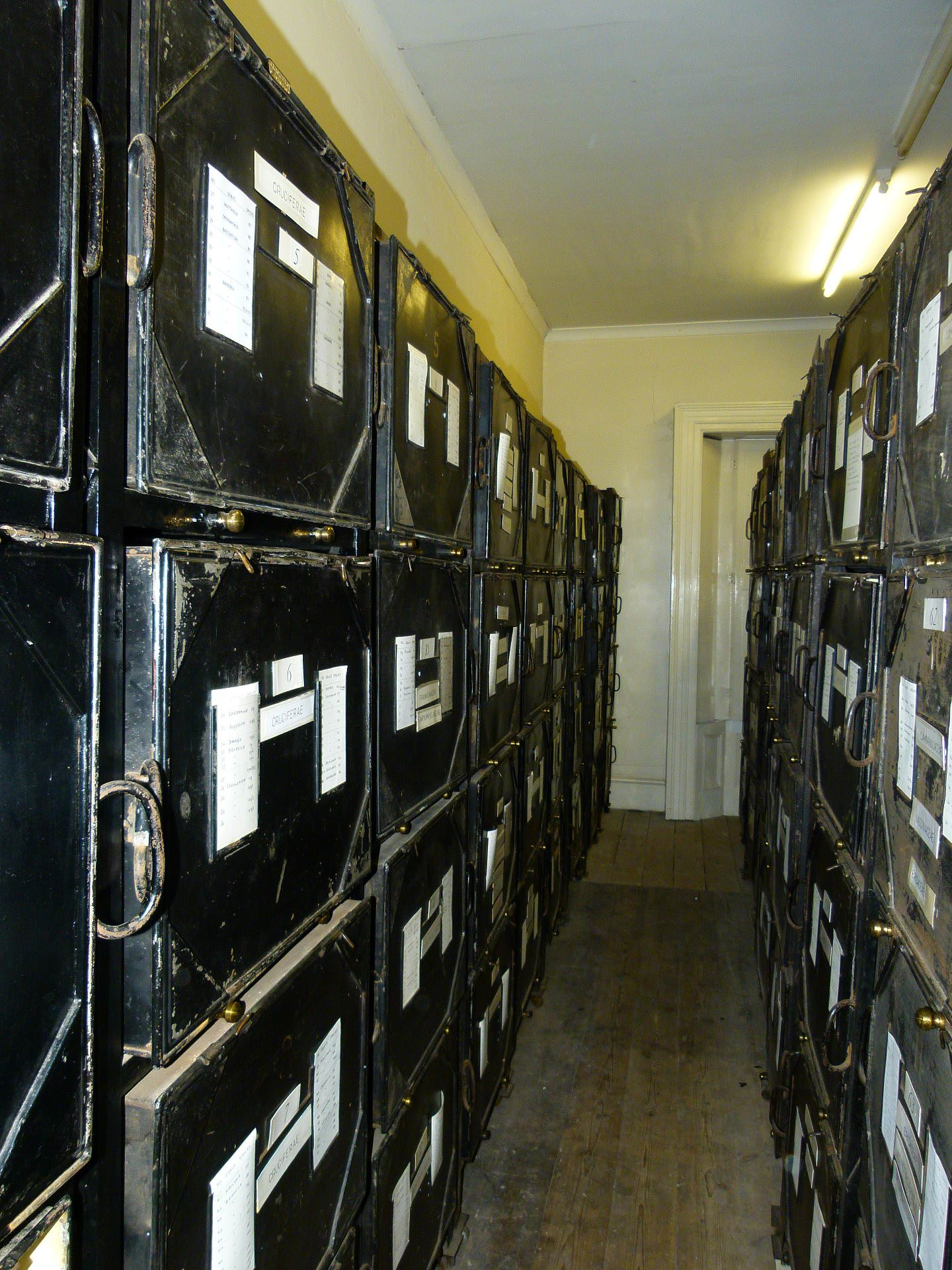
Herbarium cabinets at the SLBI

Hume took an interest in wild plants and especially on invasive species although his botanical publishing was sparse with only three short notes between 1901 and 1902 including one on a variety of Scirpus maritimus, and another on the flowering of Impatiens roylei. Hume contacted W.H. Griffin in 1901 to help develop a herbarium of botanical specimens. Hume would arrange his plants on herbarium sheets in artistic positions before pressing them. The two made many botanical trips including one to Down in Kent to seek some of the rare orchids that had been collected by Darwin. In 1910, Hume bought the premises of 323 Norwood Road, and modified it to have a herbarium and library. He called this establishment the South London Botanical Institute (SLBI) with the aim of "promoting, encouraging, and facilitating, amongst the residents of South London, the study of the science of botany."

One of the aims of the institute was to help promote botany as a means for mental culture and relaxation, an idea that was not shared by Henry Groves, a trustee for the institute. Hume objected to advertisement and refused to have any public ceremony to open the institute. The first curator was W.H. Griffin and Hume endowed the institute with £10,000. Frederick Townsend, F.L.S., an eminent botanist, who died in 1905, had left instructions that his herbarium and collection was to be given to the institute, which was then only being contemplated. Hume left £15,000 in his will for the maintenance of the botanical institute.

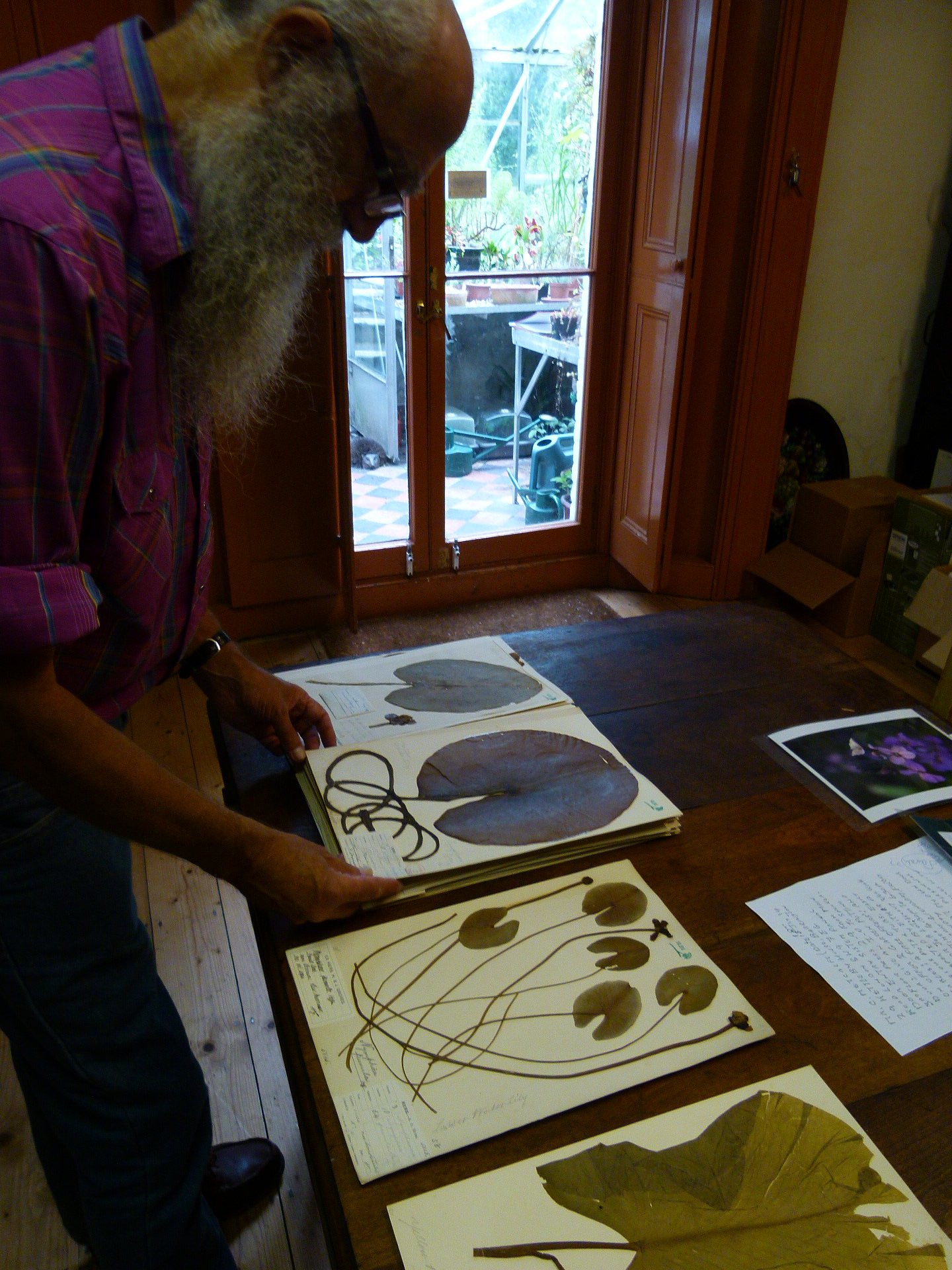
Herbarium sheets showing Hume's artistic arrangements

In the years leading up to the establishment of the institute, Hume built up links with many of the leading botanists of his day. He worked with F. H. Davey and in the Flora of Cornwall (1909), Davey thanks Hume as his companion on excursions in Cornwall and Devon, and for help in the compilation of the 'Flora', publication of which was financed by Hume. The SLBI has since grown to hold a herbarium of approximately 100,000 specimens mostly of flowering plants from Europe including many collected by Hume. The collection was later augmented by the addition of other herbaria over the years, and has significant collections of Rubus (bramble) species and of the Shetland flora.

== Works ==
- My Scrap Book: Or Rough Notes on Indian Oology and Ornithology (1869)
- List of the Birds of India (1879)
- The Nests and Eggs of Indian Birds (3-volumes)
- with Marshall, Charles Henry Tilson (1879). The Game Birds of India, Burmah and Ceylon. Calcutta: A.O. Hume & C.H.T. Marshall. OCLC 5111667. (3-volumes, 1879–1881)
- Hints on Esoteric Theosophy (1882)
- Agricultural Reform in India (1879)
- Lahore to Yarkand. Incidents of the Route and Natural History of the Countries Traversed by the Expedition of 1870 under T. D. Forsyth
- Stray Feathers (11-volumes + index by Charles Chubb)
