= Charles Henry Tilson Marshall =

British Army officer (1841–1927)

Charles Henry Tilson Marshall (1841 – 20 January 1927) was a British Army officer, serving in the Punjab, India. In his spare time he collected birds in the Punjab and the Himalayas, and sent them to Allan Octavian Hume. He was the brother of George Frederick Leycester Marshall, with whom he published ornithological articles in The Ibis. He wrote The Game Birds of India, Burmah and Ceylon along with Allan Octavian Hume in three volumes between 1878 and 1880.

He was the father of an entomologist Guy Anstruther Knox Marshall.
