= Henry Edwin Barnes =

Lieutenant Henry Edwin Barnes FZS (1848–1896) was born in Oxford and educated at Oxford University School. He worked in the Army stationed at Aden, Afghanistan and India. He wrote a Handbook to the Birds of the Bombay Presidency in 1885 and notes on birds at various places.

== Publications ==
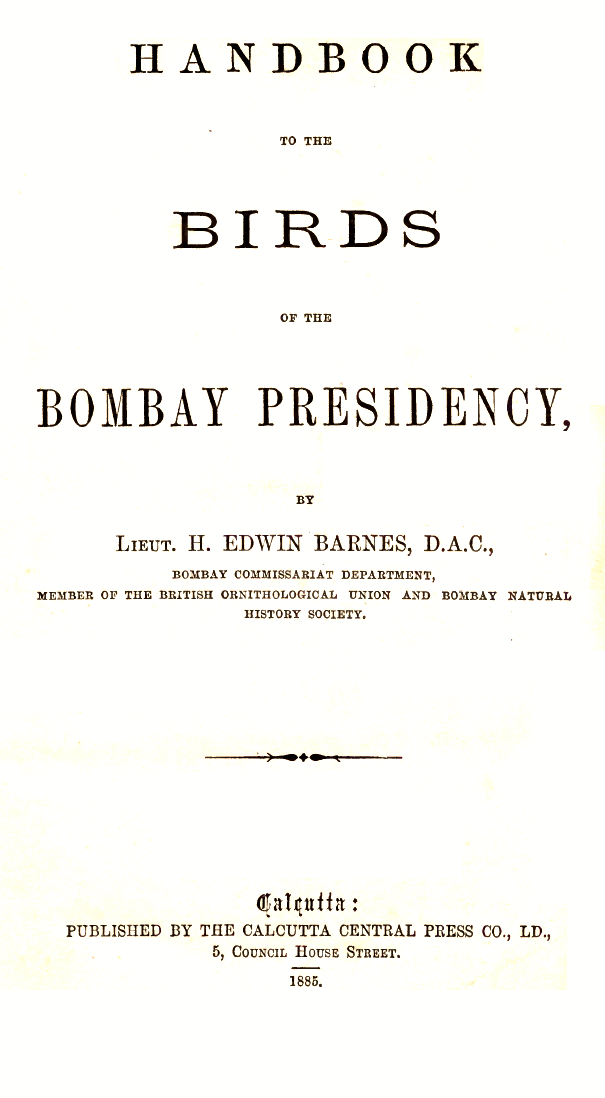
Cover of Handbook to the Birds of the Bombay Presidency

- Barnes, H. E. (1886). "Birds' nesting in Rajpootana". Journal of the Bombay Natural History Society. 1 (2): 38–62.
- ——— (1886). "Birds' nesting in Rajpootana". J. Bombay Nat. Hist. Soc. 1 (2): 308–362.
- ——— (1886). "Note on the breeding of Parra indica". J. Bombay Nat. Hist. Soc. 1 (4): 221–222.
- ——— (1887). "The two Shamas". J. Bombay Nat. Hist. Soc. 2 (1): 56.
- ——— (1887). "Notes on Ploceus philippinus". J. Bombay Nat. Hist. Soc. 2 (2): 105–107.
- ——— (1887). "Note on the irregular breeding of Grus antigone, the Sarus". J. Bombay Nat. Hist. Soc. 2 (2): 149–150.
- ——— (1892). "Note on the black-tailed rock-chat". J. Bombay Nat. Hist. Soc. 7 (2): 252–253.
- ——— (1891). "Nesting in western India". J. Bombay Nat. Hist. Soc. 6 (1): 1–25.
- ——— (1891). "Nesting in western India". J. Bombay Nat. Hist. Soc. 6 (3): 285–317.
- ——— (1890). "Nesting in western India". J. Bombay Nat. Hist. Soc. 5 (1): 1–19.
- ——— (1890). "Nesting in western India". J. Bombay Nat. Hist. Soc. 5 (2): 97–116.
- ——— (1890). "Nesting in western India". J. Bombay Nat. Hist. Soc. 5 (4): 315–337.
- ——— (1889). "Nesting in western India". J. Bombay Nat. Hist. Soc. 4 (1): 1–21.
- ——— (1888). "Nesting of Indian hirundines". J. Bombay Nat. Hist. Soc. 3 (1): 43–48.
- ——— (1888). "Nesting in western India". J. Bombay Nat. Hist. Soc. 3 (4): 205–224.
- ——— (1887). "Notes on the breeding of the Kentish Ringed Plover (Aegialitis cantianus) within Indian limits". J. Bombay Nat. Hist. Soc. 2 (3): 167–169.
- ——— (1889). "Nesting in western India". J. Bombay Nat. Hist. Soc. 4 (2): 83–97.
- ——— (1891). "Nesting in western India". J. Bombay Nat. Hist. Soc. 6 (2): 129–153.
- ——— (1889). "Nesting in western India". J. Bombay Nat. Hist. Soc. 4 (4): 237–255.
- ——— (1880). "Notes on the nidification of certain species in the neighbourhood of Chaman, S. Afghanistan". Stray Feathers. 9 (1, 2 & 3): 212–220.
- ——— (1881). "A list of birds observed in the neighbourhood of Chaman, S. Afghanistan". Stray Feathers. 9 (5 & 6) 449–460.
- ——— (1885). Handbook to the Birds of the Bombay Presidency. The Calcutta Central Press.
- Swinhoe, C. & Barnes, H. (1885). "On the birds of Central India - Part II". Ibis. 5 3 (10): 124–138.
- Swinhoe, C. & Barnes, H. (1885). "On the birds of Central India - Part I". Ibis. 5 3 (9): 52–69.
- Barnes, H. E. (1881). "Letters to the Editor". Stray Feathers. 10 (1, 2 & 3) 166–167.
- ——— (1897). The Birds of India: A Guide to Indian Ornithology. 1981 Reprint ed. 2 vols. Cosmo Publications, New Delhi.
