= Emanuel Bonavia =

Maltese surgeon and botanist

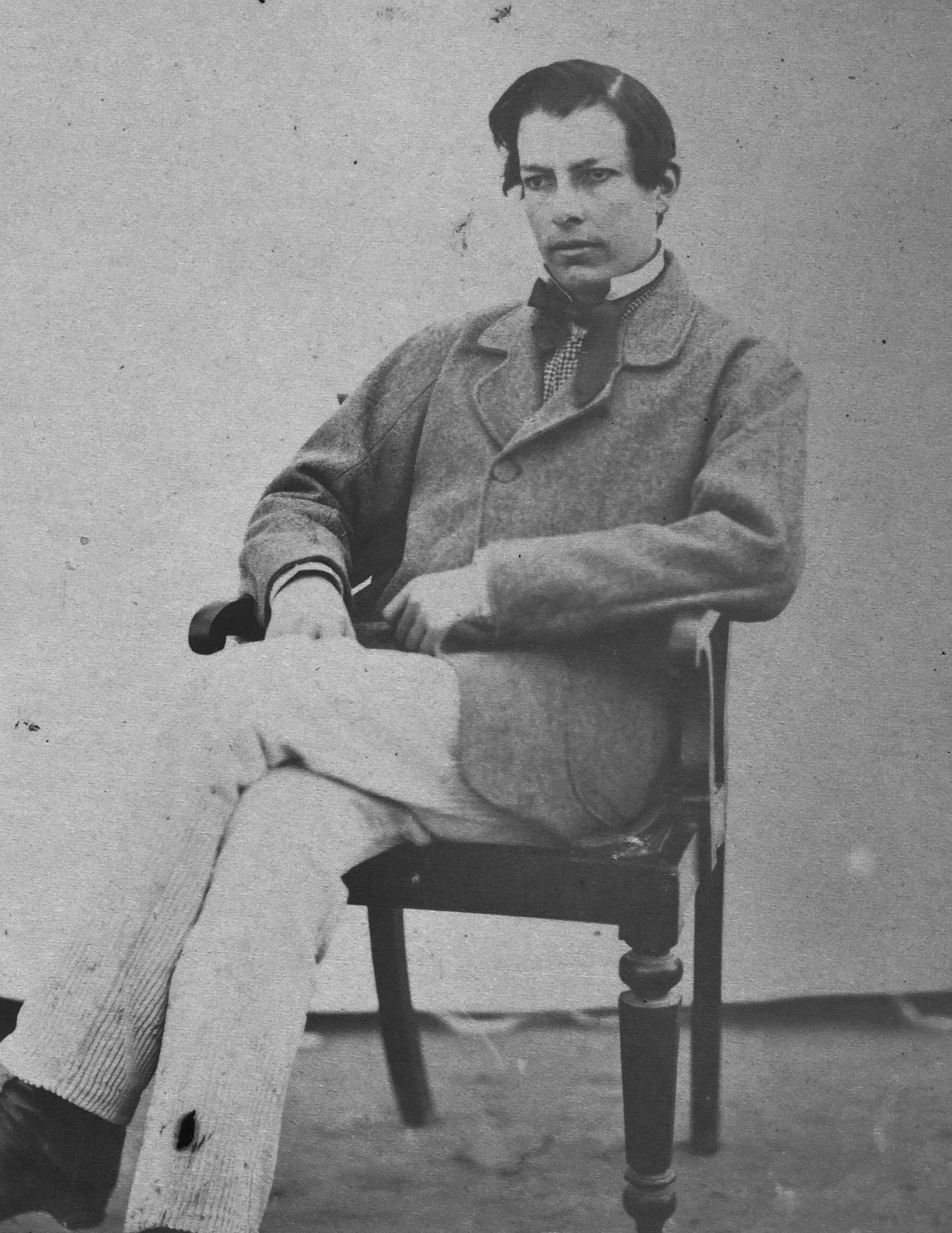
A photograph of Dr Bonavia from the J. Paul Getty Museum

Emanuel W. Bonavia (also spelled Emmanuel) (15 July 1829 – 14 November 1908) was a Maltese surgeon in the Indian Medical Service who wrote on many aspects of natural history, economic botany, and pioneered horticultural research in Lucknow. He was the first superintendent of the Lucknow Provincial Museum and the founder of the Lucknow Horticultural Gardens.

== Life and work ==
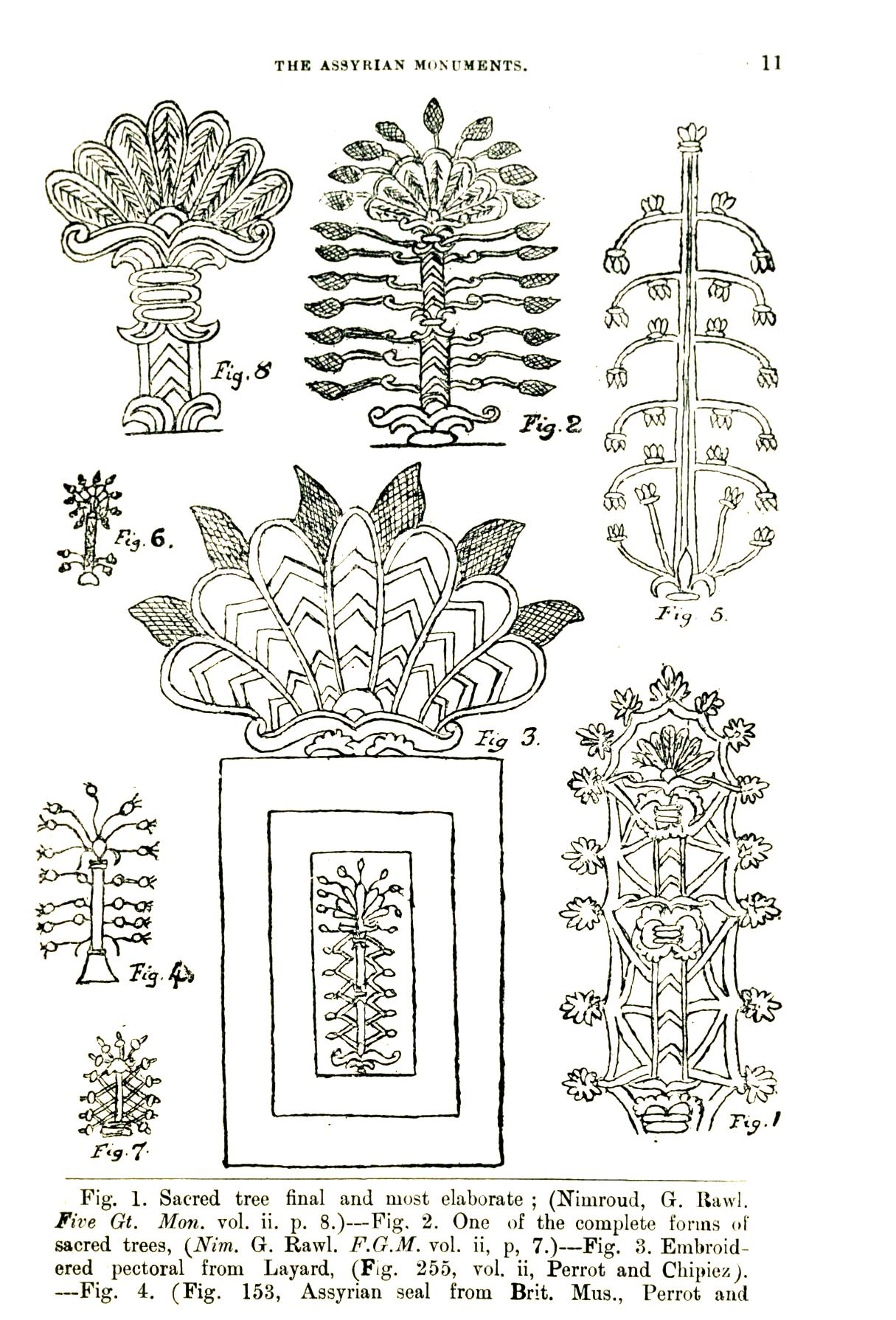
Illustrations of Assyrian sacred trees by Bonavia (1888)

Bonavia was born in Valletta in British colonial Malta, the third son of Mary née Hobson and Calcedonio Bonavia. An older brother Giuseppe became an architect in the Royal Engineers while another brother George became an artist. Emanuel studied medicine at the University of Malta and at the University of Edinburgh qualifying MRCS in 1857. He was commissioned Assistant Surgeon in the Indian Medical Service on 4 August 1857 and was present at the capture of Lucknow in March 1858 and saw action at the trans-Gogra campaign. He was promoted Surgeon Major in 1876 and Brigade Surgeon in 1885, retiring in 1888. He served as Principal of the medical school at Balrampur in 1873. Trained in medical botany, he came to take charge of the Lucknow garden in 1876. The Lucknow botanical garden began as a park after 1857. He then began to study the cultivation of citrus, date palms (an interest in date palms also led to studies on floral depiction in Assyrian monuments, suggesting that the Assyrian sacred tree was based on multiple trees of value including a date palm as the trunk) and other plants of economic importance. He wrote a book examining the prospects of cultivating date palms in India and The Villager's Domestic Medicine (1885). He speculated on the ancestry of Indian acid lime. He also published on sericulture in Oudh. He was also interested in other aspects of natural history and wrote a book on evolution which examined such aspects as the evolution of spots and stripes in wild cats and the origins of other animal skin patterning. He speculated that these patterns were derived from armoured ancestors such as glyptodonts with the ancestral rosette as seen in the leopard consolidated into spots in cheetahs, blotches, and stripes in other cats. In his Contributions to Christology (1869) he attempted to identify rational explanations for miracles involving animals. He corresponded with Charles Darwin, and naturalists in India such as Allan Octavian Hume to whom he sent bird specimens. He was one of the founders of the Lucknow museum (Oudh provincial museum), established in 1863. He contributed specimens to the museum, including that of a pink-headed duck, obtained from the local market. Bonavia also maintained careful records of weather and examined long-term variation in the patterns of rains, supporting the theory that linked them to sun-spots. He also served as a Civil Surgeon at Etawah and worked on public sanitation, making attempts to stop open defecation in Lucknow. Bonavia retired in 1888 and lived on Richmond road, Worthing, Sussex, continuing to take an interest in gardening and hybridization of ornamental plants, publishing in the Gardener's Chronicle, until his death.
