= Charles Swinhoe =

English officer, naturalist, lepidopterist (1838–1923)

Colonel Charles Swinhoe (27 August 1838 in Calcutta – 2 December 1923) was an English naturalist and lepidopterist, who served in the British Army in India. He was one of the eight founders of the Bombay Natural History Society and a brother of the famous naturalist Robert Swinhoe.

Swinhoe was commissioned ensign in the 56th Regiment of Foot without purchase in 1855, serving in the Crimea and reaching India after the 1857 Mutiny. He exchanged into a lieutenancy in the 15th Foot without purchase in 1858 and returned to the 56th Foot in 1859, transferring to the Bombay Staff Corps later the same year. He was at Kandahar with Lord Roberts in 1880, and collected 341 birds there and on the march back to India. These were described in The Ibis (1882: 95–126). He was promoted lieutenant-colonel in 1881 and colonel in 1885.

Swinhoe was a keen shikari and had shot 50–60 tigers. He was also a member of the British Ornithologists' Union and contributed papers to The Ibis on the birds of southern Afghanistan and central India, and donated 300 bird skins from each country to the British Museum. While at Mhow he collaborated with Lieutenant Henry Edwin Barnes on the birds of central India. (Ibis 1885: 62–69, 124–138) He collected insects, chiefly Lepidoptera from Bombay, Poona, Mhow and Karachi districts. He had one of the largest collections of Indian Lepidoptera at the time (40,000 specimens of 7,000 species and 400 new species described by him), and completed the Lepidoptera Indica series after the death of Frederic Moore in 1907. He also published in the Annals and Magazine of Natural History. He also wrote A Revision of the Genera of the Family Liparidae which covered 1130 entries and published a Catalogue of the Moths of India (Calcutta, 1887–89) with Everard Charles Cotes. After retirement he settled at Oxford and received an honorary M.A. for his work in entomology. The Entomological Society of France made him an honorary member. His Lepidoptera collection was purchased by James John Joicey.

== See also ==
- Taxa named by Charles Swinhoe
