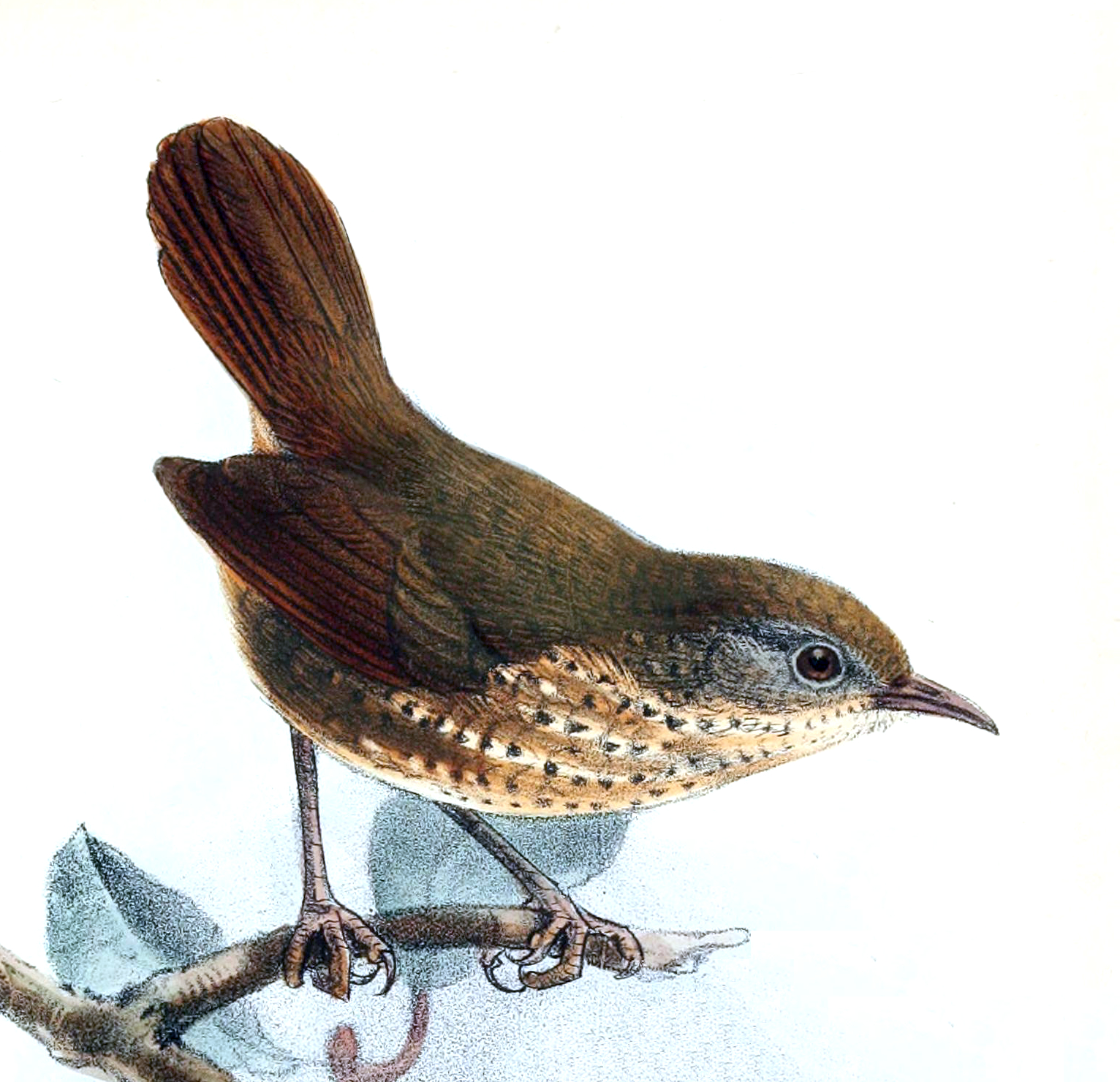

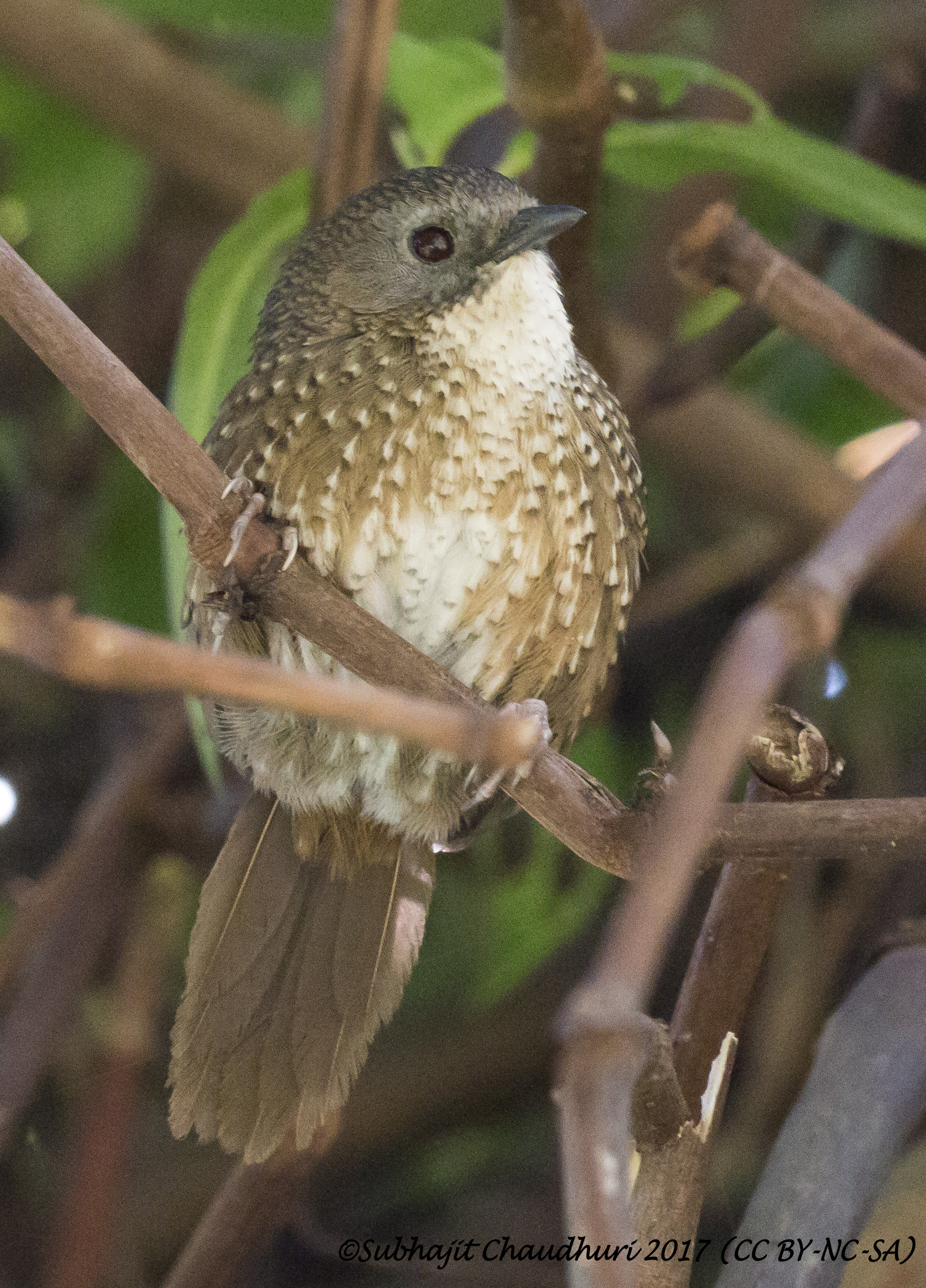
- Nagaland, India

Conservation status
- Vulnerable (IUCN 3.1)

Scientific classification
- Kingdom: Animalia
- Phylum: Chordata
- Class: Aves
- Order: Passeriformes
- Family: Timaliidae
- Genus: Spelaeornis
- Species: S. chocolatinus

Binomial name
- Spelaeornis chocolatinus (Godwin-Austen & Walden, 1875)

= Naga wren-babbler =

Species of bird

The Naga wren-babbler or long-tailed wren-babbler (Spelaeornis chocolatinus) is a bird species in the family Timaliidae. In India it is found in Nagaland and Manipur.

Several former subspecies of this bird have now been recognized as good species. They are: pale-throated wren-babbler (S. kinneari), Chin Hills wren-babbler (S. oatesi) and grey-bellied wren-babbler (S. reptatus). Together, the group was collectively known as the long-tailed wren-babbler.

The natural habitats of the long-tailed wren-babbler are subtropical or tropical moist montane forests. Following the splitting of the newly recognized species, the populations remaining in S. chocolatinus are small enough to warrant uplisting to near threatened status, from the previous IUCN assessment of least concern.
