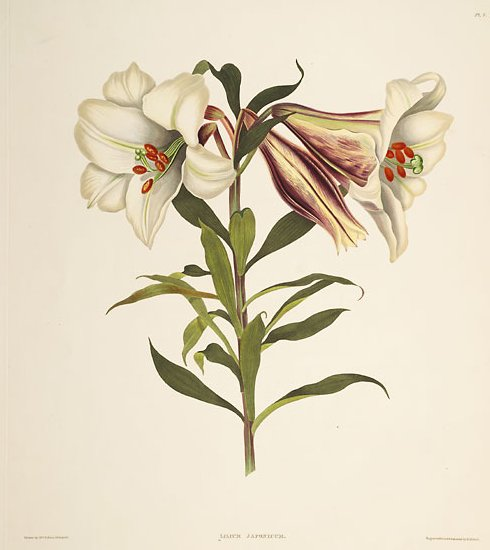

Scientific classification
- Kingdom: Plantae
- Clade: Embryophytes
- Clade: Tracheophytes
- Clade: Angiosperms
- Clade: Monocots
- Order: Liliales
- Family: Liliaceae
- Subfamily: Lilioideae
- Genus: Lilium
- Species: L. brownii
- Variety: L. b. var. viridulum

Trinomial name
- Lilium brownii var. viridulum Baker

Synonyms
- Lilium aduncum Elwes; Lilium brownii var. chlorasteri Baker; Lilium brownii var. colchesteri (Van Houtte) Stapf; Lilium brownii var. odorum (Planch.) Baker; Lilium japonicum var. colchesteri Van Houtte; Lilium longiflorum var. purpureoviolaceum H.Lév.; Lilium odorum Planch.

= Lilium brownii var. viridulum =

Species of lily

Lilium brownii var. viridulum is a variety of Lilium brownii native to China.

== Names ==
Lilium brownii var. viridulum was named 百合 (bai he, "hundred united") in Chinese, referring to the numerous scales of a bulb.

Its Korean name is 당나리 (Tang lily), indicating it was introduced from China. In the late 16th century, it was introduced to Japan, probably from Korea via the port of Hakata (the old name of Fukuoka), and therefore named ハカタユリ (Hakata lily) in Japanese. However, there is another story in which the lily was given by a Chinese man to a Japanese woman in Hakata.

== Cultivation and uses ==
The bulb of Lilium brownii var. viridulum has been used as food and medicine in China for about 2,000 years. Its cultivation occurred no later than 1,000 years ago, after which many poems were written to praise the beauty and fragrance of its flower, indicating it was also widely cultivated as an ornamental plant back then. The famous 12th-century poet Lu You was especially fond of this lily and even grew some in front of his window.

A landrace called "dragon-tooth lily" (龍牙百合 long ya bai he, depicting the appearance of the bulb scales) is especially renowned for its large-sized and good-quality bulb, and is one of the three most important lilies for culinary and medicinal uses in China. The other two are L. lancifolium and L. davidii var. unicolor. The bulb of the dragon-tooth lily has a bland taste, while the bulb of L. lancifolium is bitter and that of L. davidii var. unicolor is sweet. In Taiwan, both the flower and bulbs are used as food, as are the other related species: L. lancifolium, L. pumilum and L. candidum.
