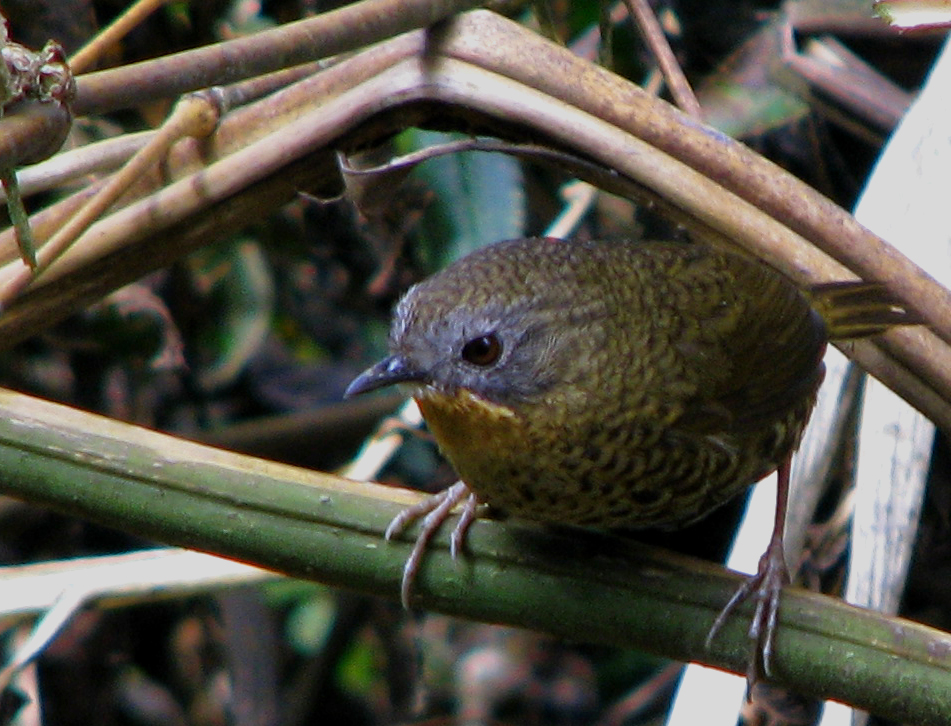
- Rufous-throated wren-babbler, (Spelaeornis caudatus)

Scientific classification
- Kingdom: Animalia
- Phylum: Chordata
- Class: Aves
- Order: Passeriformes
- Family: Timaliidae
- Genus: Spelaeornis; David & Oustalet, 1877

Type species
- Pnoepyga troglodytoides Verreaux, J, 1871

Species
- 8, see text

= Spelaeornis =

Genus of birds

Spelaeornis, the typical wren-babblers, is a bird genus in the Old World babbler family Timaliidae. They are found in the eastern Himalayas and Myanmar.

== Taxonomy ==
The genus Spelaeornis was introduced in 1877 by the French naturalists Armand David and Émile Oustalet. They placed two species in the genus but did not specify the type. In 1882 the English ornithologist Richard Bowdler Sharpe designated the type as Pnoepyga troglodytoides Verreaux, J, 1871, the bar-winged wren-babbler. The genus name combines the Ancient Greek σπηλαιον/spēlaion meaning "cave" with ορνις/ornis, ορνιθος/ornithos meaning "bird".

== Species ==
The genus contains the following 8 species:

Image	Common name	Scientific name	Distribution
	Rufous-throated wren-babbler	Spelaeornis caudatus	Bhutan, India, and Nepal
	Mishmi wren-babbler	Spelaeornis badeigularis	Northeast India.
	Bar-winged wren-babbler	Spelaeornis troglodytoides	Bhutan, China, India, and Myanmar
	Naga wren-babbler	Spelaeornis chocolatinus	Nagaland and Manipur
	Grey-bellied wren-babbler	Spelaeornis reptatus	China (Yunnan), India (Arunachal Pradesh), Myanmar, and Thailand
	Chin Hills wren-babbler	Spelaeornis oatesi	India and Myanmar
	Pale-throated wren-babbler	Spelaeornis kinneari	Vietnam
	Tawny-breasted wren-babbler	Spelaeornis longicaudatus	Khasi Hills of Northeast India

The spotted elachura (Elachura formosa) was at one time placed in this genus but is now assigned to its own genus Elachura and own family Elachuridae.
