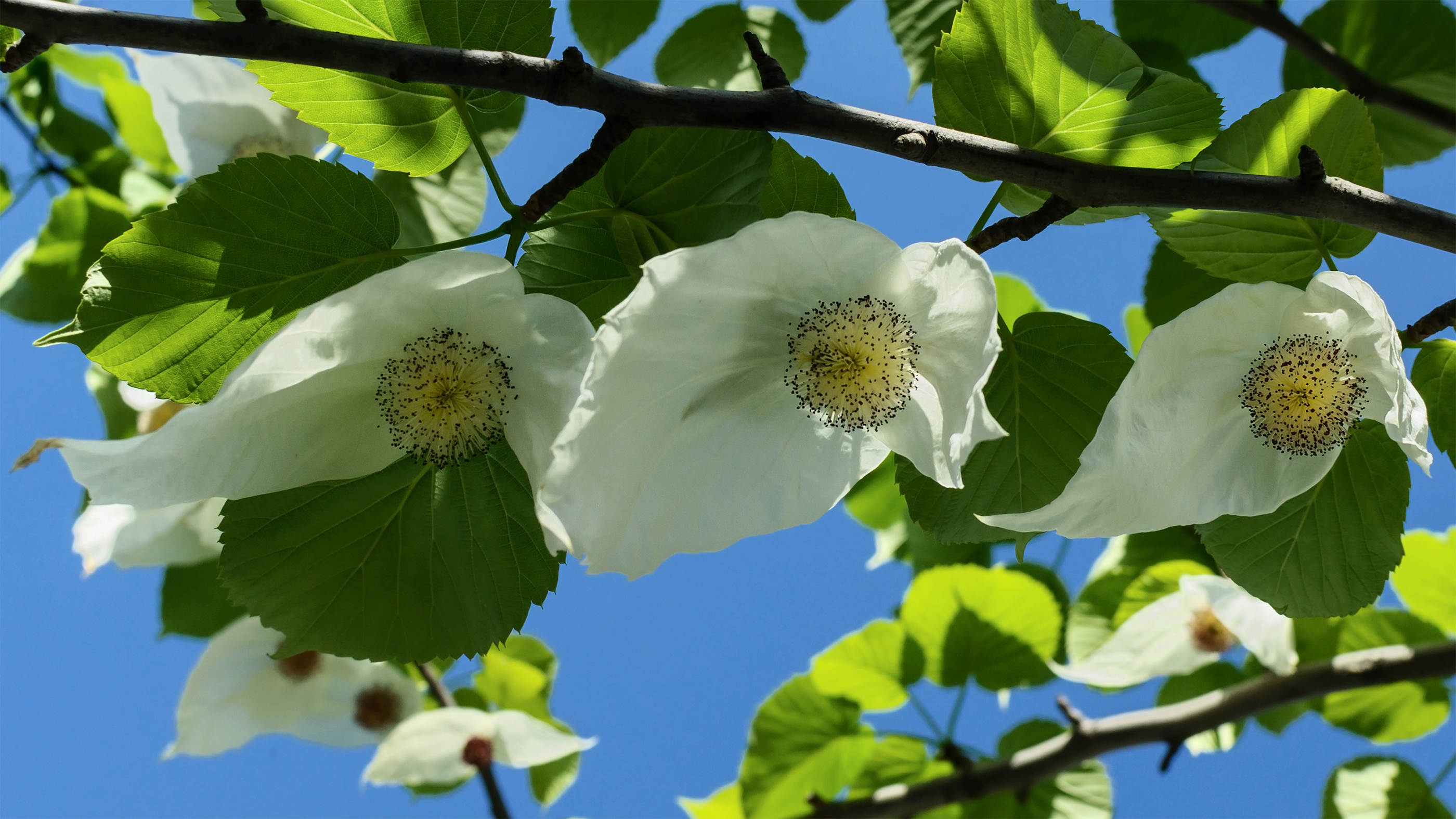

Scientific classification
- Kingdom: Plantae
- Clade: Tracheophytes
- Clade: Angiosperms
- Clade: Eudicots
- Clade: Asterids
- Order: Cornales
- Family: Nyssaceae
- Genus: Davidia; Baill.
- Species: D. involucrata

Binomial name
- Davidia involucrata Baill.

Synonyms
- Davidia laeta

= Davidia involucrata =

Species of flowering plant

Davidia involucrata, dove tree, ghost tree, handkerchief tree, or pocket handkerchief tree is a medium-sized deciduous tree in the family Nyssaceae. It is the only living species in the genus Davidia. It was previously included with tupelos in the dogwood family, Cornaceae. Fossils of the species have been found in the Upper Cretaceous.

== Taxonomy ==
Davidia involucrata is the only member of its genus, but two varieties differing slightly in their leaves were formerly often distinguished, D. involucrata var. involucrata, with the leaves densely pubescent on the underside, and D. involucrata var. vilmoriniana, with glabrous or only thinly hairy leaves. These are now known to intergrade and are no longer considered distinct; earlier reports of differing chromosome numbers between the two (which if true would prevent interbreeding) proved erroneous due to the difficulty of counting numerous small chromosomes accurately, with the species now confirmed to have 2n = 42 chromosomes.

== Description ==
It is a moderately fast-growing tree, growing to 20–25 m (66–82 ft) in height, with toothed, alternate, ovate-cordate leaves superficially resembling those of a lime (Tilia), except that they are symmetrical, lacking the lop-sided base typical of lime leaves; the leaves are mostly 10–20 cm long and 7–15 cm wide.

Davidia involucrata is best known for its inflorescence that features two large, white bracts, the lower almost twice the size of the upper, surrounding a purplish-red flower head. The Latin specific epithet involucrata means "with a ring of bracts surrounding several flowers". The true flowers form a tight head about 1–2 cm across, each flower head with a pair of large (12–25 cm), pure white bracts at the base, performing the function of petals in attracting pollinators. The inflorescences hang in long rows beneath the horizontal branches, and appear prolifically in late spring. On a breezy day, the bracts flutter in the wind like white doves or pinched handkerchiefs; hence the English names for this tree.

The fruit is a very hard nut about 3 cm long surrounded by a green husk about 4 cm long by 3 cm wide, hanging on a 10 cm stalk. The nut contains 3–6 seeds. According to Turner and Wasson, these seeds can take as long as three years to germinate.

== Distribution and habitat ==
Davidia involucrata is native to South Central and Southeast China. It grows in montane mixed forests.

== History ==
The genus Davidia is named after Father Armand David (1826–1900; "Père David"), a French Vincentian missionary and keen naturalist who lived in China. David first described the tree in 1869 as a single tree found at over 2,000 m (6,562 ft) altitude, and sent dried specimens to Paris; in 1871, Henri Baillon described it as a new genus and species.

The British plant hunter Augustine Henry again found a single tree, this time in the Yangtse Ichang gorges and sent the first specimen to Kew Gardens. The plant collector Ernest Henry Wilson was employed by Sir Harry Veitch to find Henry's tree but arrived to find that it had been felled for building purposes; however, he later found a grove of the trees overhanging a sheer drop. Returning to Britain, Wilson's boat was wrecked, but he managed to save his Davidia specimens, one of which survives today in the Arnold Arboretum.

== Gallery ==
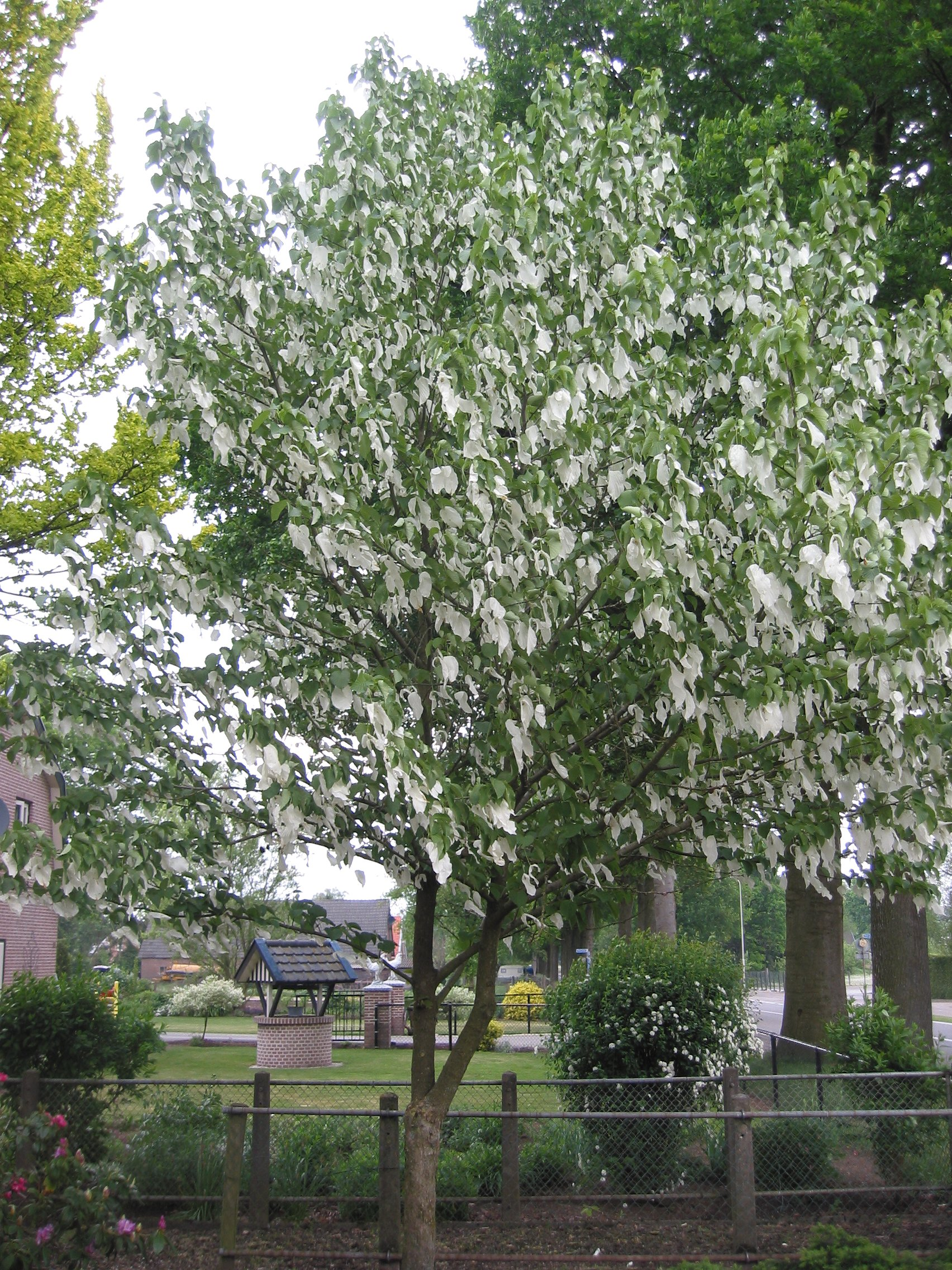
Young tree in flower

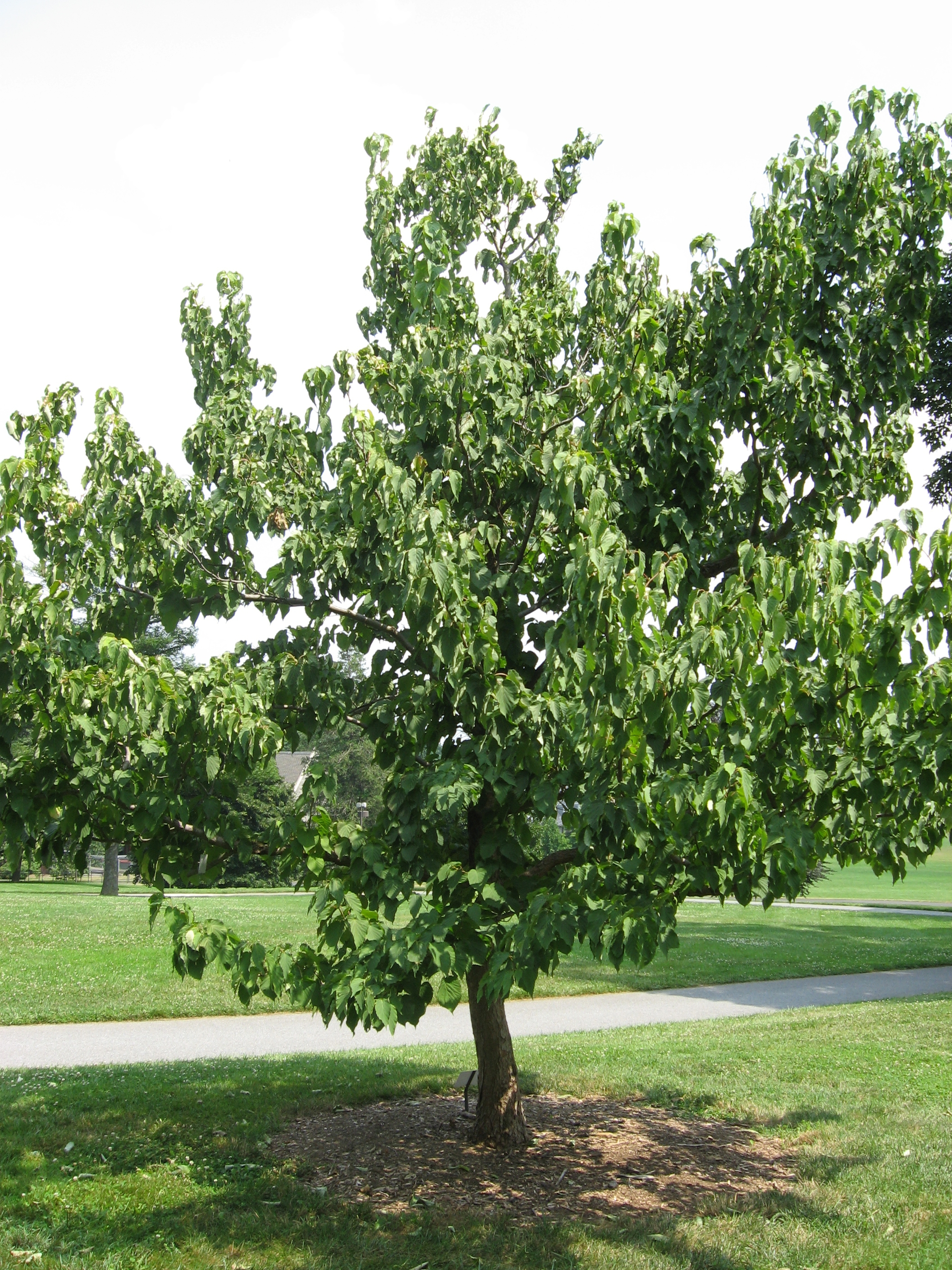
Young tree

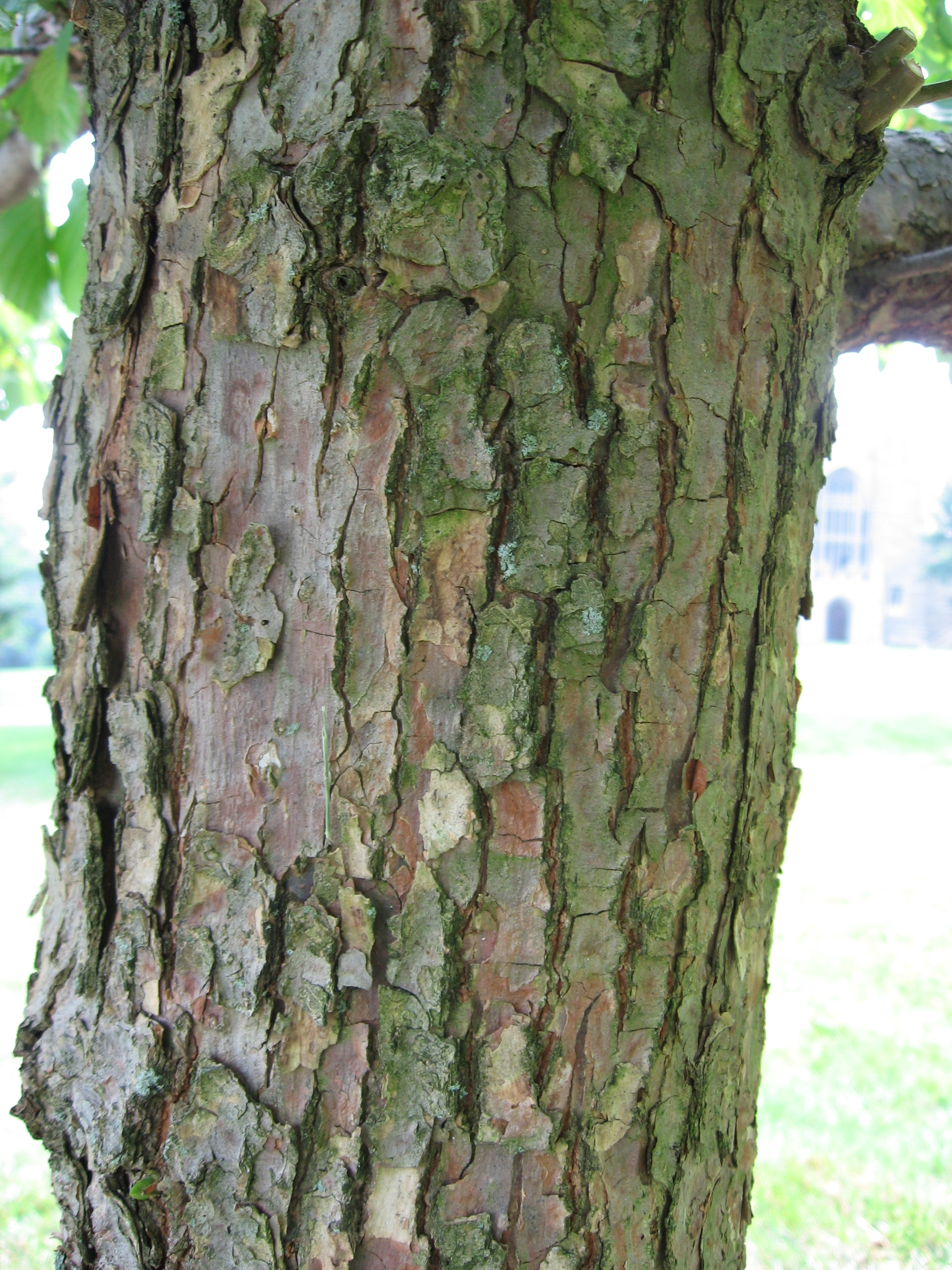
Bark

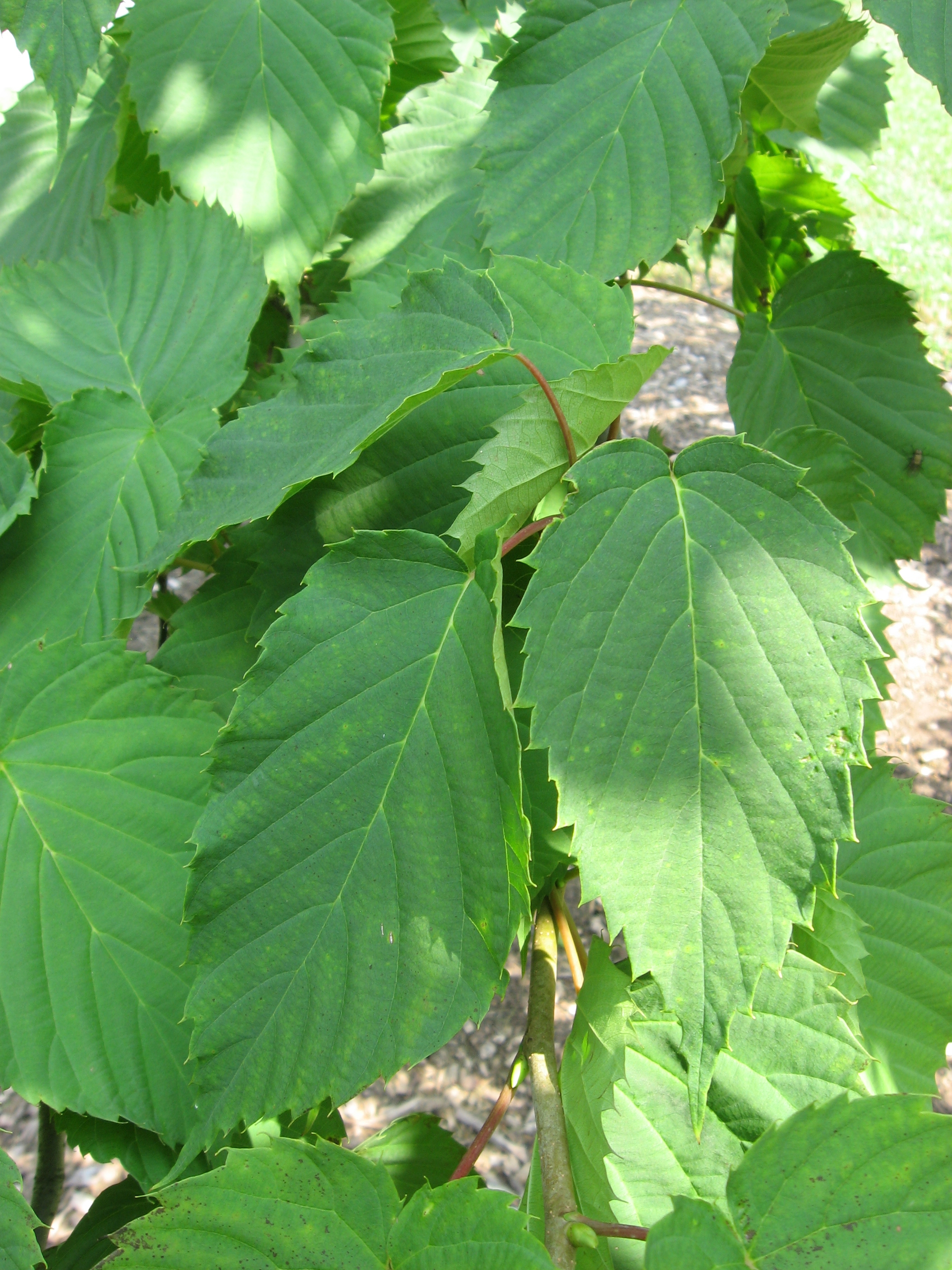
Leaves

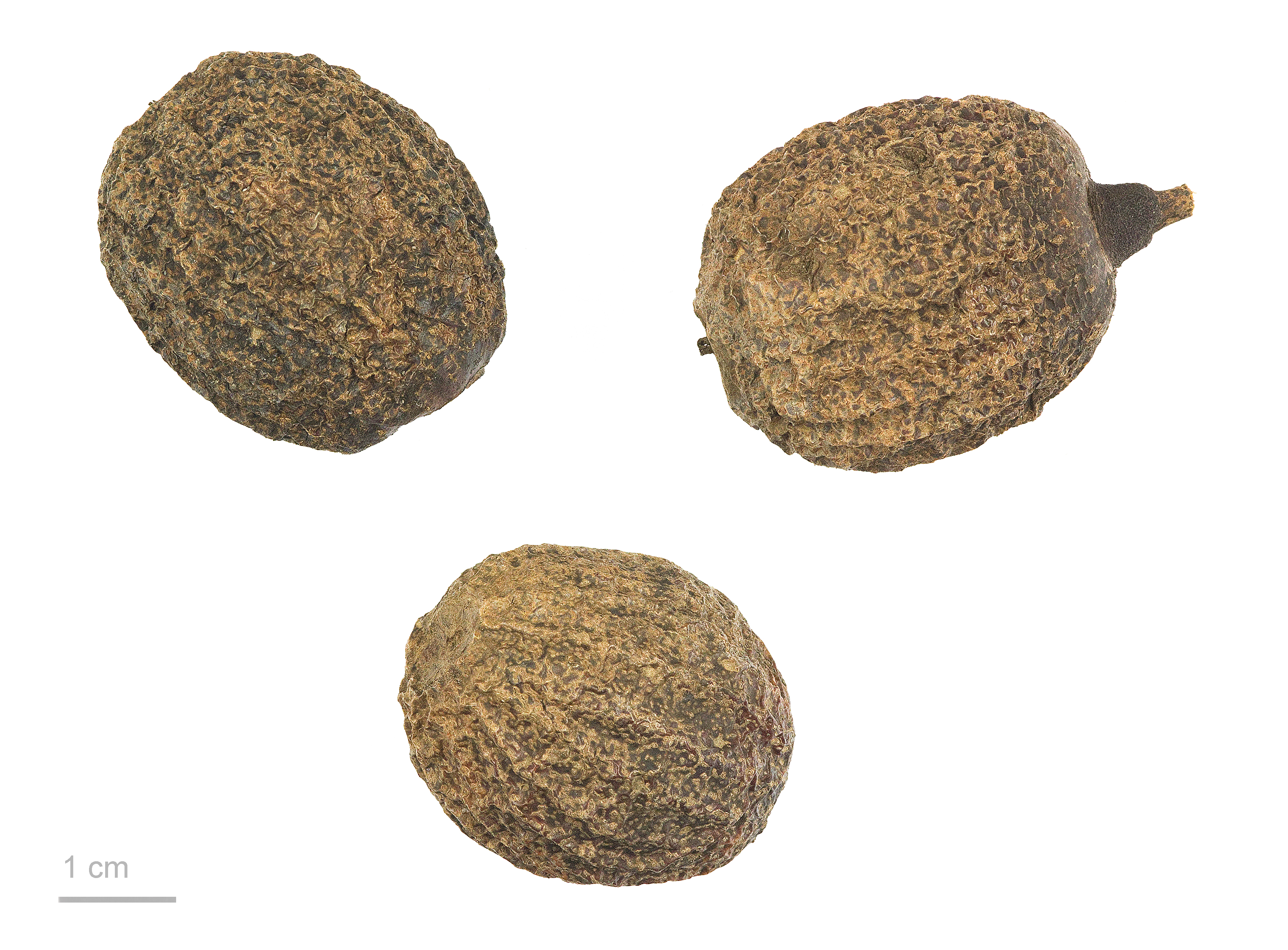
Davidia fruit (MHNT)

== Fossil record ==
The oldest probable fossils of Davidia are permineralized fruit from the Upper Cretaceous (Campanian) Horseshoe Canyon Formation of Dinosaur Provincial Park near Drumheller, Alberta, Canada. Those fruit are smaller than those of D. involucrata and have fewer locules, but are otherwise similar in morphology to the extant genus.

In 2009, B. I. Pavlyutkin described Miocene fossils in Primorsky Krai and assigned them to a new species in the genus Davidia.

== Cultivation ==
The species was introduced from China to Europe and North America in 1904, and is a popular ornamental tree in parks and larger gardens. Most trees in cultivation are of the glabrous form, which has proved much better able to adapt to the climatic conditions in Europe and North America.

This tree and the cultivated variety D. involucrata var. vilmoriniana have gained the Royal Horticultural Society's Award of Garden Merit.
