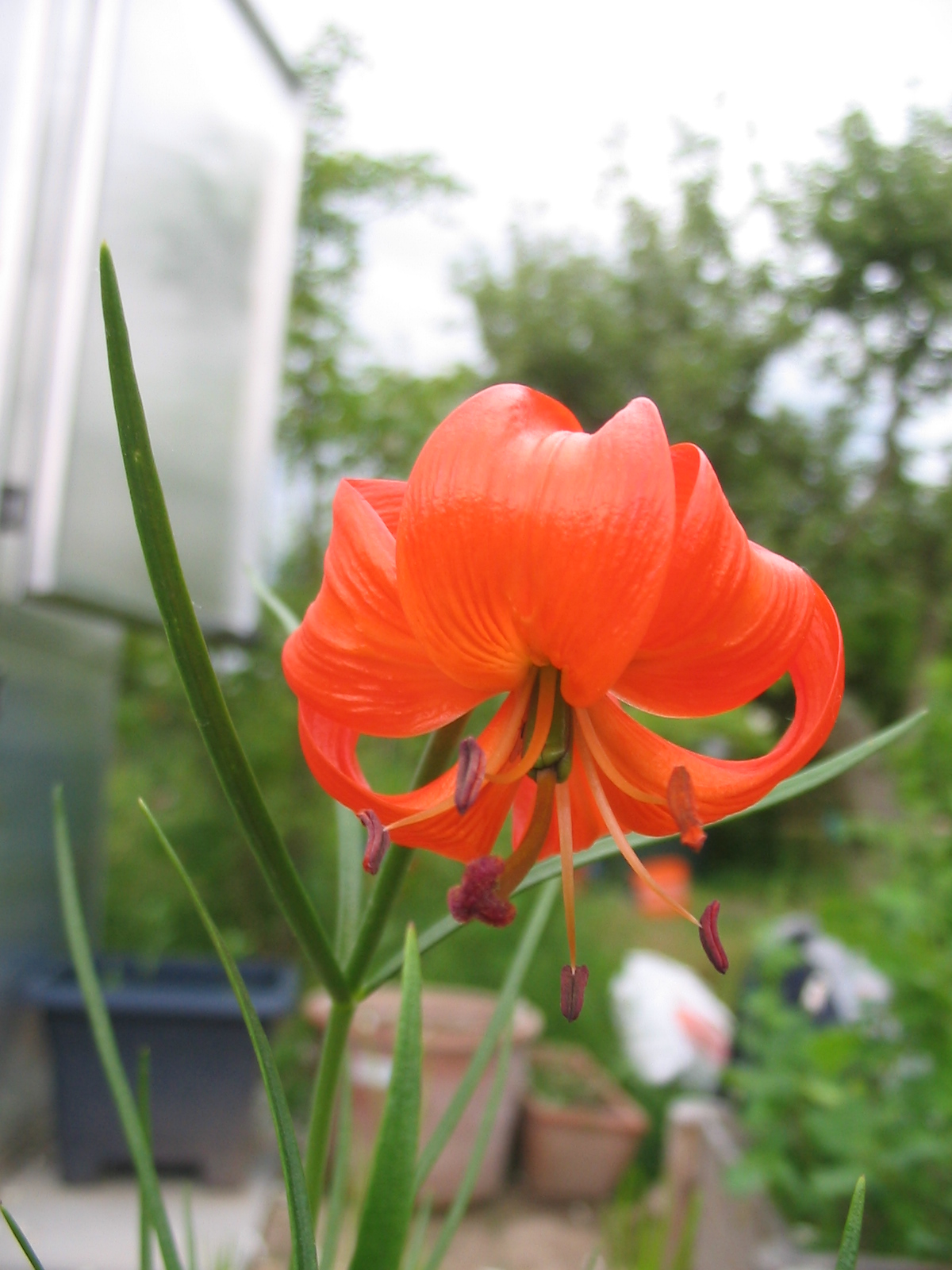

Scientific classification
- Kingdom: Plantae
- Clade: Tracheophytes
- Clade: Angiosperms
- Clade: Monocots
- Order: Liliales
- Family: Liliaceae
- Subfamily: Lilioideae
- Tribe: Lilieae
- Genus: Lilium
- Species: L. pumilum

Binomial name
- Lilium pumilum DC

Synonyms
- Lilium linifolium Hornem.; Lilium puniceum Siebold & de Vriese; Lilium stenophyllum Baker; Lilium tenuifolium Fisch. ex Hook.f.; Lilium sinensium Gand.; Lilium chrysanthum Nakai & Maek.; Lilium potaninii Vrishcz

= Lilium pumilum =

Species of lily

Lilium pumilum is an Asian species of bulbous plants native to Mongolia, Siberia, the Russian Far East (Amur Krai, Primorye, Khabarovsk), Korea and northern China.

It is a stem-rooting bulb that grows up to 1 metre (3 ft 3 in) high, though usually rather less. The bulb itself is 4–5 inches (100–130 mm) deep and live from 2 to 4 years. The leaves are slender and grassy. It bears from one to twenty reflexed and nodding flowers, usually red in colour, and which may be spotted with black. The flowers are scented.

Named pumilum (`poo`mill`um) for its small size, compared to other lilies

It may be short lived in cultivation, but tends to last longest in well-drained soils.

In Taiwan, both the flower and bulbs are used as food, as are the other related species: L. brownii var. viridulum, L. lancifolium and L. candidum.
