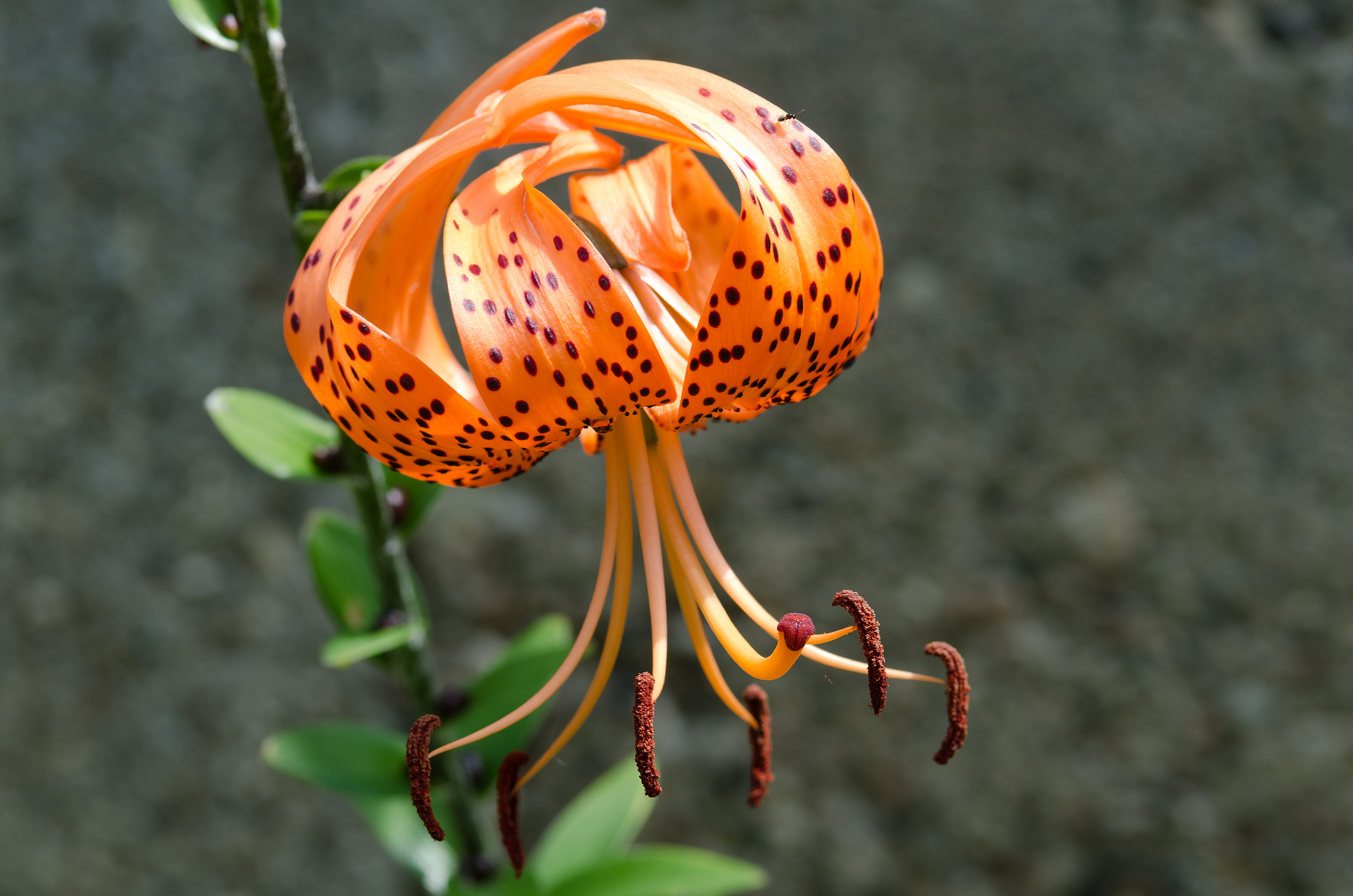

Scientific classification
- Kingdom: Plantae
- Clade: Tracheophytes
- Clade: Angiosperms
- Clade: Monocots
- Order: Liliales
- Family: Liliaceae
- Subfamily: Lilioideae
- Genus: Lilium
- Species: L. lancifolium

Binomial name
- Lilium lancifolium Thunb.

Synonyms
- Synonymy: Lilium leopoldii Baker; Lilium lishmannii T.Moore; Lilium tigrinum Ker Gawl.

= Lilium lancifolium =

Species of lily

Lilium lancifolium (syn. L. tigrinum) is an Asian species of lily, native to China, Japan, Korea, and the Russian Far East. It is widely planted as an ornamental because of its showy orange-and-black flowers, and sporadically occurs as a garden escapee in North America, particularly the eastern United States including New England, and has made incursions into some southern states such as Georgia.

It has the English name tiger lily, but that name has been applied to other species as well.

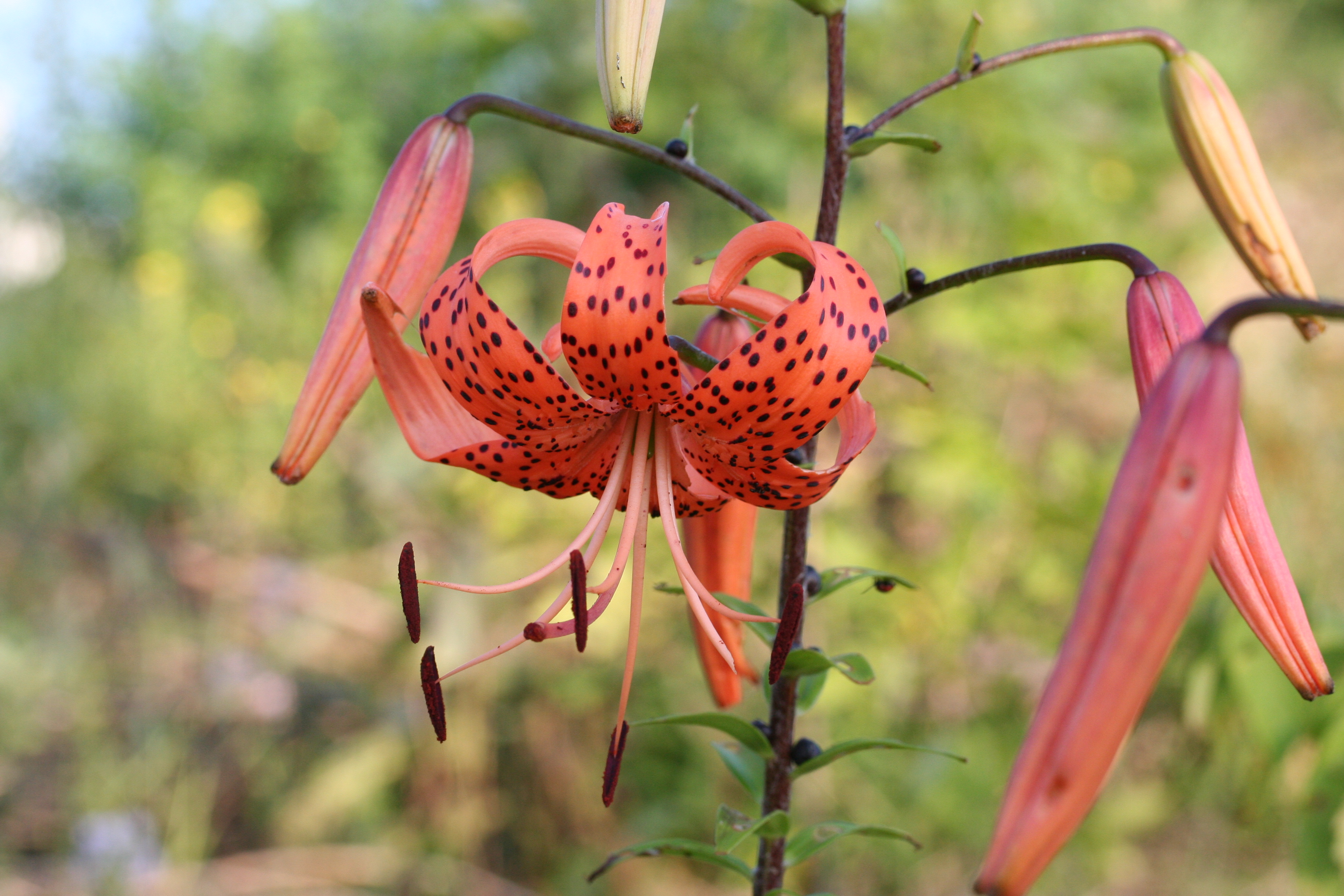
Lilium lancifolium, Batiscan, Quebec, Canada

== Description ==
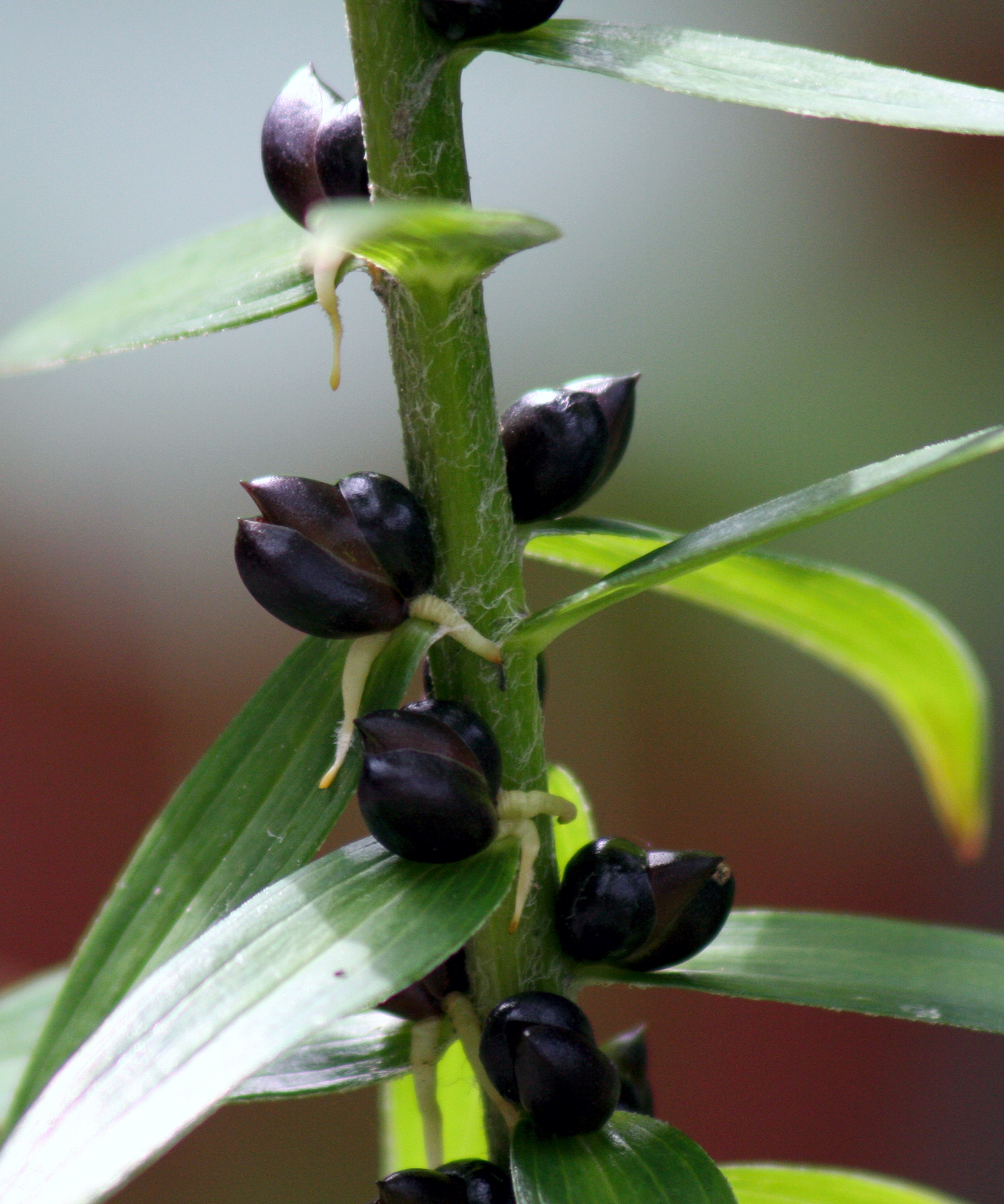
Leaf axil bulbils with developing roots in late summer

Like other true lilies, the flowers are borne on upright stems that are 80–200 centimetres (31–79 inches) tall and bear lanceolate leaves 6–10 cm (2 1/2–4 in) long and 1–2 cm (3/8–3/4 in) broad. L. lancifolium produces aerial bulblets, known as bulbils, in the leaf axils. These bulbils are uncommon in Lilium species and they produce new plants that are clones of the original plant.

The flowers are odorless. Each lasts a few days and if pollinated produces capsules with many thin seeds.

Extrafloral nectaries on the species were first noted by Zimmerman 1932.

=== Reproduction ===
These lilies are capable of both sexual and asexual reproduction, dependent on the cytotype. Some populations of the plant are diploid (have two copies of their chromosomes) and some populations are triploid (have three copies of their chromosomes). The North American population is mainly triploid, while the Asian populations may be either. The diploid populations can undergo both forms of reproduction. The triploid populations, however, are sterile and limited to asexual reproduction only. They mainly reproduce by forming bulbils in the leaf axis.

== Taxonomy ==
=== Varieties ===
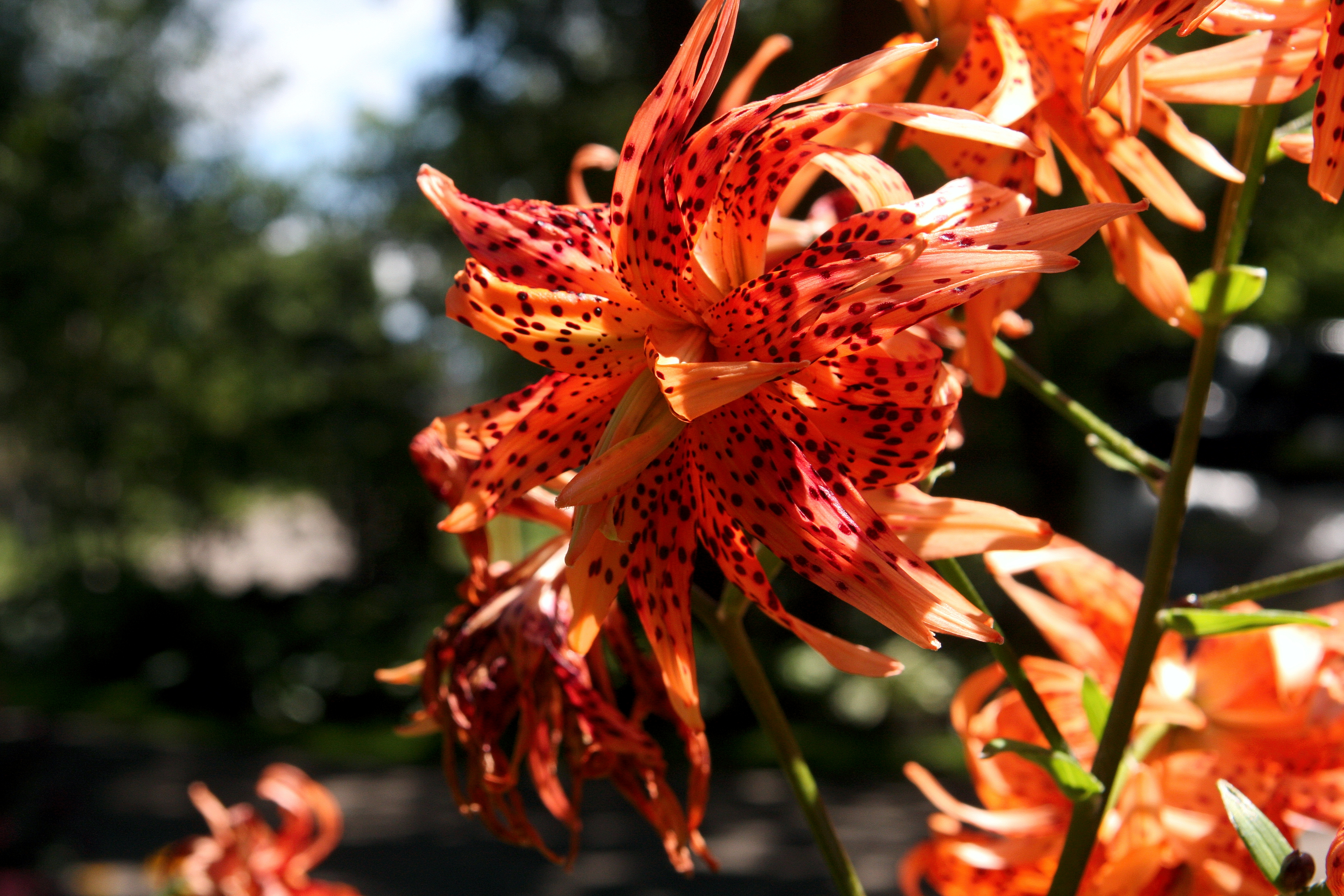
Lilium lancifolium 'Flore Pleno' (double tiger lily)

The names of names considered as varieties at some time are:

- Lilium lancifolium var. densum W.Bull
- Lilium tigrinum var. fortunei Standish
- Lilium tigrinum var. splendens Van Houtte
- Lilium tigrinum var. flore-pleno auct.
- Lilium tigrinum var. erectum G.F.Wilson
- Lilium tigrinum var. plenescens Waugh
- Lilium lancifolium var. flaviflorum Makino
- Lilium lancifolium var. fortunei (Standish) V.A.Matthews
- Lilium lancifolium var. splendens (Van Houtte) V.A.Matthews

The Lilium tigrinum flore pleno, the double-flowered variety, had been exported out of Japan by William Bull since 1869.

=== Names ===
==== Scientific names ====
Botanists for many years considered L. tigrinum (after Ker Gawler) the correct scientific name until it was determined that older name L. lancifolium (after Thunberg) refers to the same species, and the latter became the accepted name. (Note: Under the rules of international botanical nomenclature, the older name takes precedence.)

==== Vernacular names ====
Its common name is tiger lily. Although this name is ambiguous across several species, it is correctly applied to this species alone.

== Cat toxicity ==
A case study of the successful treatment of a cat that ingested this particular species was published in 2007.

== Uses ==
It is cultivated and wild foraged in Asia for its edible bulbs. The cultivar 'Splendens' has gained the Royal Horticultural Society's Award of Garden Merit. In Taiwan, both the flower and bulbs are used as food, as are the other related species: L. brownii var. viridulum, L. pumilum and L. candidum.
