= Long-tailed wren-babbler =

The long-tailed wren-babbler has been split into the following species:

- Naga wren-babbler, Spelaeornis chocolatinus
- Pale-throated wren-babbler, Spelaeornis kinneari
- Chin Hills wren-babbler, Spelaeornis oatesi
- Grey-bellied wren-babbler, Spelaeornis reptatus
