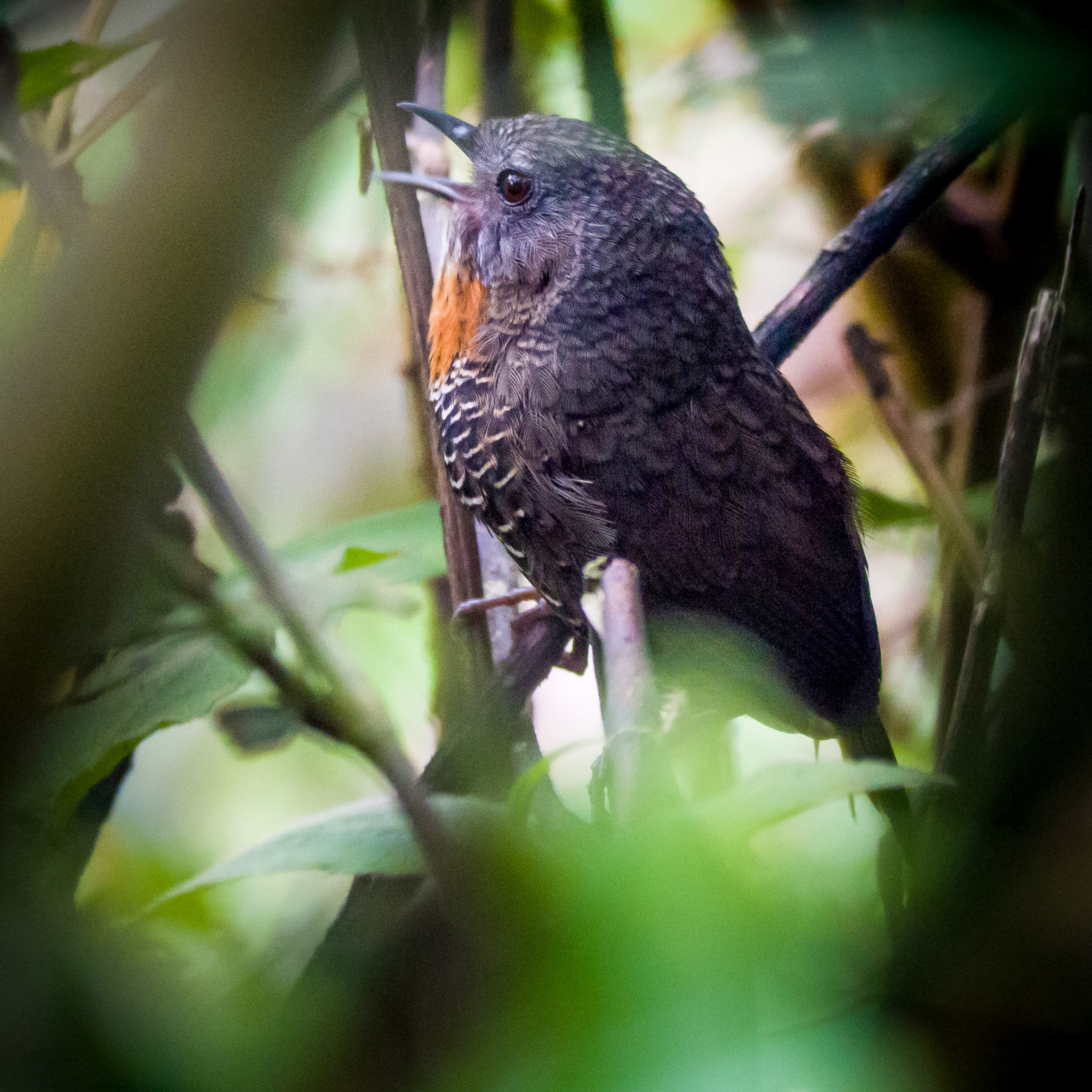

Conservation status
- Vulnerable (IUCN 3.1)

Scientific classification
- Kingdom: Animalia
- Phylum: Chordata
- Class: Aves
- Order: Passeriformes
- Family: Timaliidae
- Genus: Spelaeornis
- Species: S. badeigularis

Binomial name
- Spelaeornis badeigularis Ripley, 1948

= Mishmi wren-babbler =

Species of bird

The Mishmi wren-babbler (Spelaeornis badeigularis) is a species of bird in the family Timaliidae. It is endemic to Northeast India.

Its natural habitat is subtropical or tropical moist montane forest. It is threatened by habitat loss. The species was first described based on a bird collected in 1947 but was not seen again until 2004, when a field trip discovered it to be moderately common in a restricted area of Mishmi Hills in Arunachal Pradesh.
