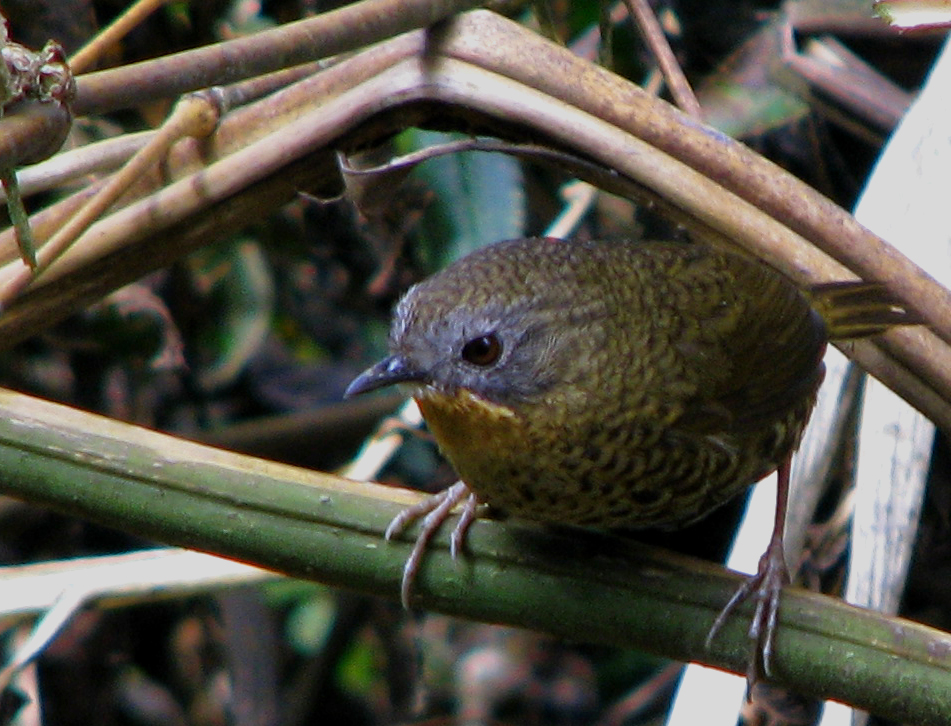

Conservation status
- Near Threatened (IUCN 3.1)

Scientific classification
- Kingdom: Animalia
- Phylum: Chordata
- Class: Aves
- Order: Passeriformes
- Family: Timaliidae
- Genus: Spelaeornis
- Species: S. caudatus

Binomial name
- Spelaeornis caudatus (Blyth, 1845)

= Rufous-throated wren-babbler =

Species of bird

The rufous-throated wren-babbler (Spelaeornis caudatus) is a species of bird in the family Timaliidae. It is found in Bhutan, India, and Nepal.

Its natural habitat is the Eastern Himalayan broadleaf forests. It is becoming rare due to habitat loss.
