= Tawny-breasted wren-babbler =

- Tawny-breasted wren-babbler from Cherrapunjee, Meghalaya

Conservation status
- Near Threatened (IUCN 3.1)

Scientific classification
- Kingdom: Animalia
- Phylum: Chordata
- Class: Aves
- Order: Passeriformes
- Family: Timaliidae
- Genus: Spelaeornis
- Species: S. longicaudatus

Binomial name
- Spelaeornis longicaudatus (Moore, F, 1854)

Species of bird of India

The tawny-breasted wren-babbler (Spelaeornis longicaudatus) is a species of bird in the family Timaliidae. It is endemic to the Khasi Hills of Northeast India.

Its natural habitat is subtropical or tropical moist montane forest. It is threatened by habitat loss.
