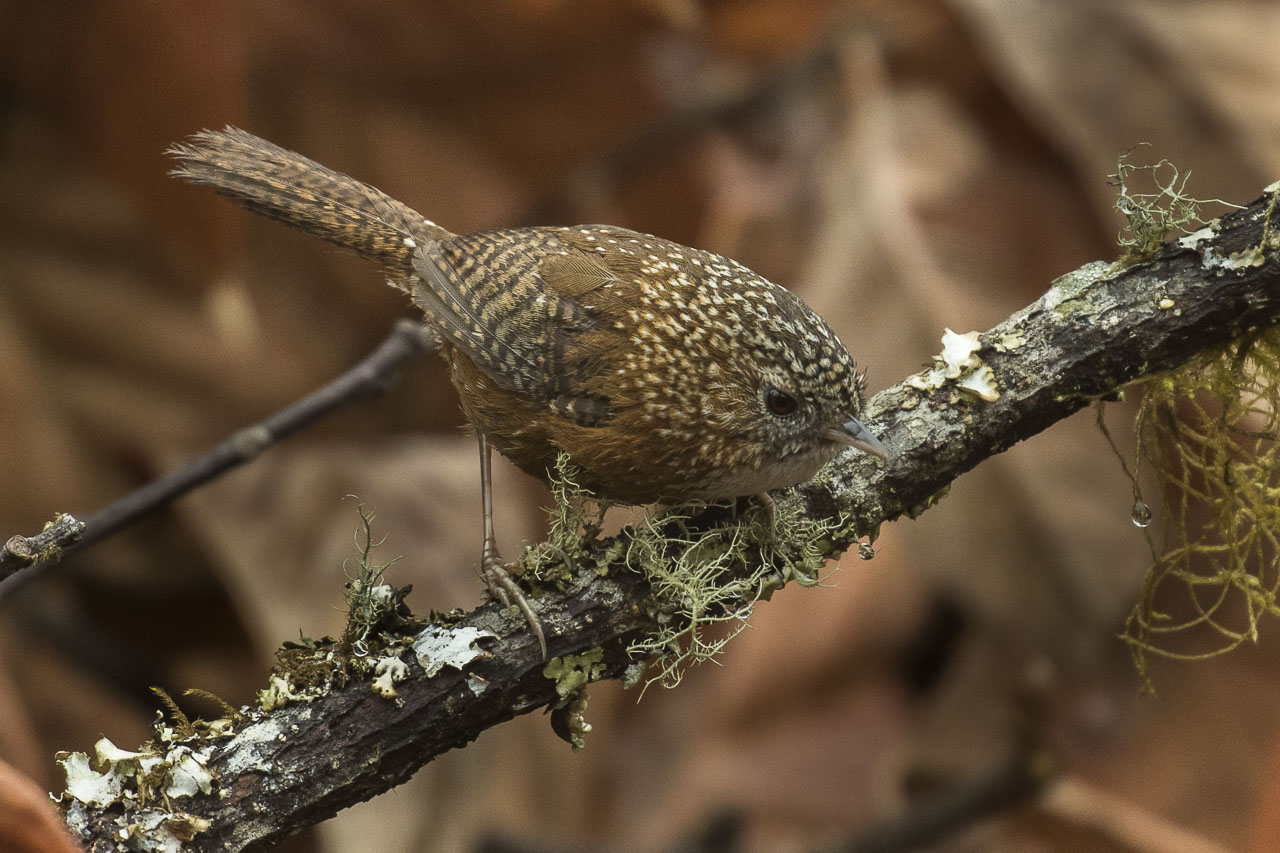

Conservation status
- Least Concern (IUCN 3.1)

Scientific classification
- Kingdom: Animalia
- Phylum: Chordata
- Class: Aves
- Order: Passeriformes
- Family: Timaliidae
- Genus: Spelaeornis
- Species: S. troglodytoides

Binomial name
- Spelaeornis troglodytoides (Verreaux, 1871)

Synonyms
- Pnoepyga troglodytoides

= Bar-winged wren-babbler =

Species of bird

The bar-winged wren-babbler (Spelaeornis troglodytoides) is a species of bird in the family Timaliidae. It is found in Bhutan, China, India, and Myanmar. Its natural habitat is subtropical or tropical moist montane forest.

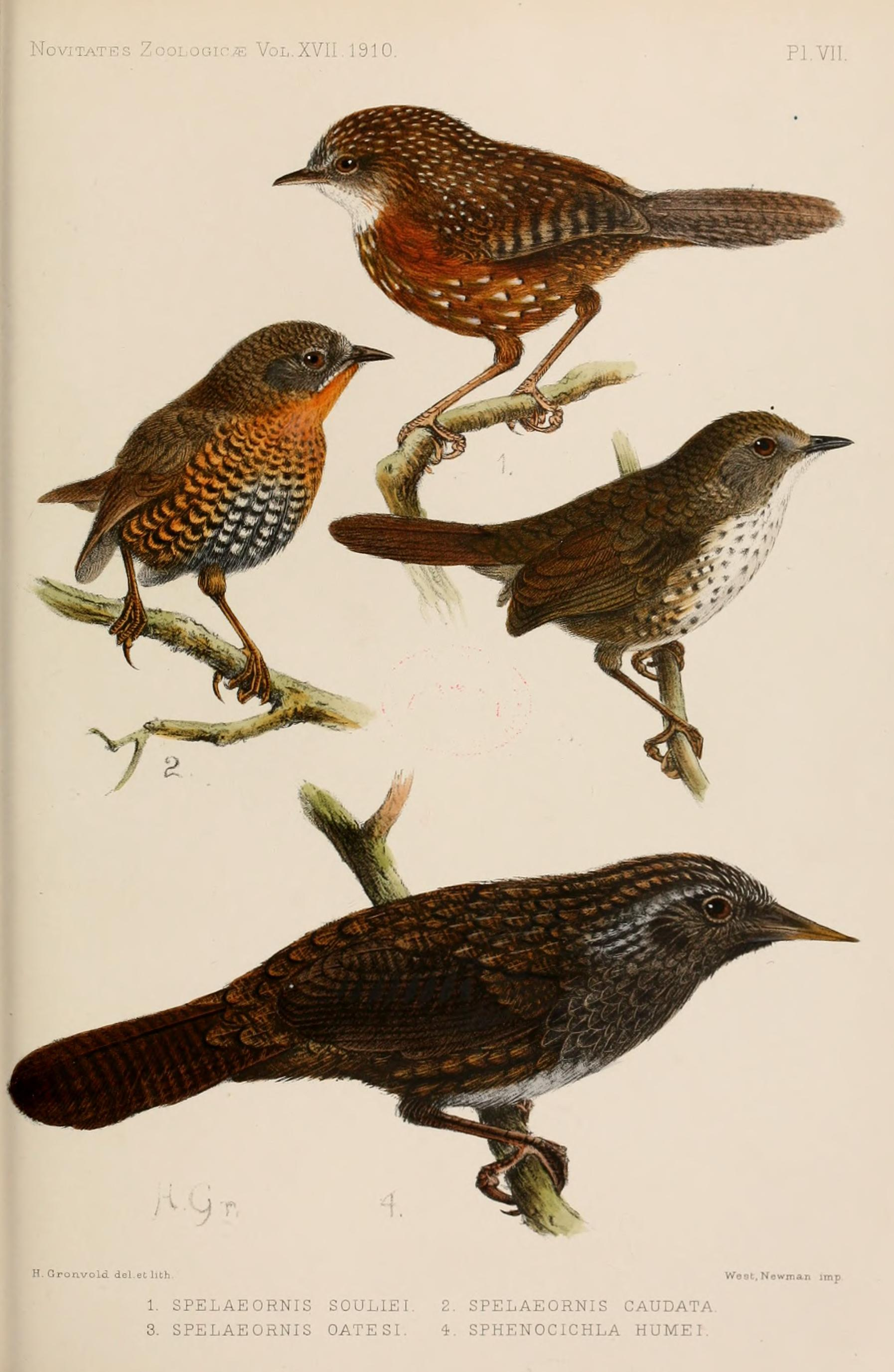
Spelaeornis troglodytoides souliei Oustalet, 1898

There are variations among the populations and three subspecies are named.

- sherriffi Kinnear, 1934 from eastern Bhutan and Arunachal Pradesh
- indiraji Ripley et al., 1991 from Arunachal Pradesh (Namdapha National Park) which is named after Indira Gandhi.
- souliei Oustalet, 1898 - northern Arunachal Pradesh (NE India) Myanmar and S China
