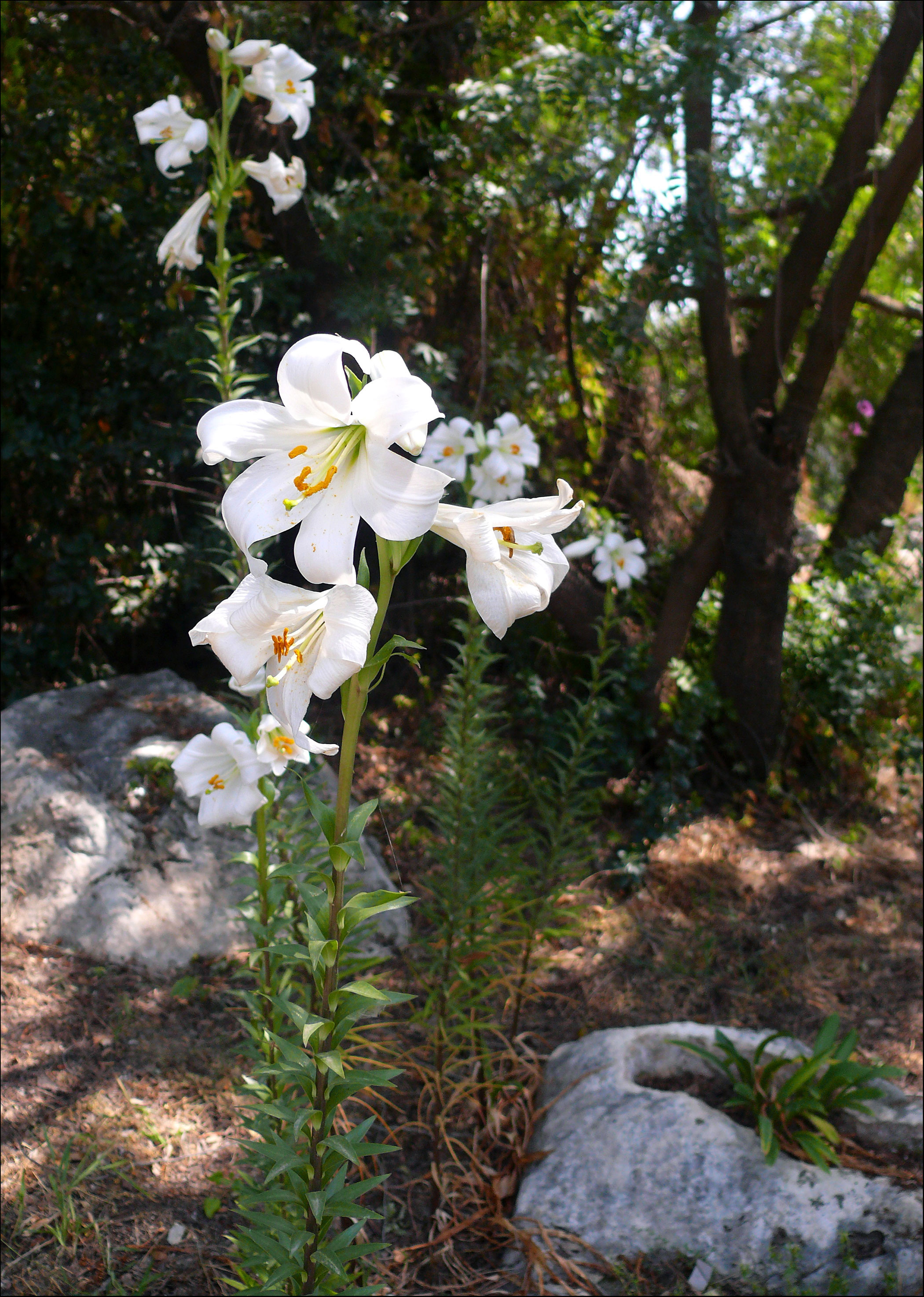

Scientific classification
- Kingdom: Plantae
- Clade: Tracheophytes
- Clade: Angiosperms
- Clade: Monocots
- Order: Liliales
- Family: Liliaceae
- Subfamily: Lilioideae
- Tribe: Lilieae
- Genus: Lilium
- Species: L. candidum

Binomial name
- Lilium candidum L.

Synonyms
- Lilium peregrinum Mill.; Lilium album Houtt.; plus numerous names at the levels of varieties and subspecies

= Lilium candidum =

Species of lily

Lilium candidum, the Madonna lily or white lily, is a plant in the true lily family. It is native to the Balkans and Middle East, and naturalized in other parts of Europe, including France, Italy, and Ukraine, and in North Africa, the Canary Islands, Mexico, and other regions. It has been cultivated since antiquity, for at least 3,000 years, and has great symbolic value since then for many cultures. It is susceptible to several virus diseases common to lilies, and especially to Botrytis fungus. One technique to avoid problems with viruses is to grow plants from seed instead of bulblets.

== Description ==
It forms bulbs at ground level, and, unlike other lilies, grows a basal rosette of leaves during winter, which die the following summer. A leafy floral stem, which generally grows 1.2 metres (3 ft 11 in) tall, but exceptionally 2 metres (6 ft 7 in) tall, emerges in late spring and bears several sweetly and very fragrant flowers in summer. The flowers are pure white and tinted yellow in their throats.

== In culture ==
Madonna lilies are depicted commonly in ancient Minoan frescoes, most famously in Prince of the Lilies in the palace of Knossos, but also in the "House of the Lilies" in Amnisos, while lilies coloured red are depicted on a shrine in a Xesté 3 fresco and the "Spring Fresco" in Akrotiri. The reasoning behind red lilies is unknown.

Some translations of the Bible identify the Hebrew word Shoshannah as "lily" in the Song of Songs: "As the lily among thorns, so is my love among the daughters." (Song of Songs, 2:2 (KJV)) Customarily it is translated as "rose". For example, Abraham ibn Ezra described it as a white flower, which has a good fragrance, and has a six petaled flower and six stamens. But its identity is uncertain, because it typically grows in montane places and not in valleys as the phrase "the lily of the valleys" would have it.

The Bible describes King Solomon's Temple as adorned with designs of Madonna lilies on the columns, and on the brazen Sea (Laver).

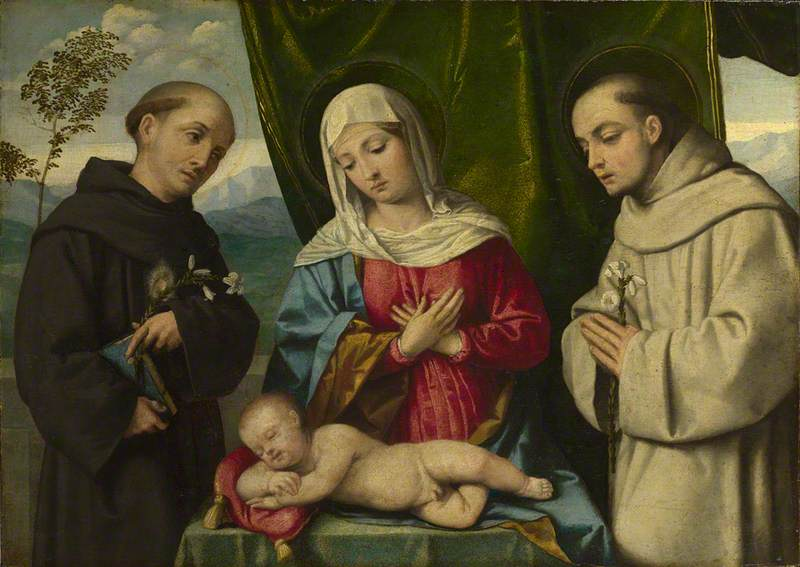
Madonna and child with Saints Anthony of Padua and Nicholas of Tolentino. Both saints are holding white lilies to symbolise their chaste life.

The white lily symbolizes chastity in the iconography of the Catholic Church and some of the Orthodox churches. For example, Medieval depictions of the Annunciation show Gabriel the Archangel handing a white lily to the Virgin Mary. Additionally, the white lily is the attribute of other virginal and chaste saints, such as Saint Joseph, Saint Anthony of Padua, Saint Kateri Tekakwitha, and Saint Maria Goretti.

The French adopted the symbol of the fleur de lis, which can be described as a stylized Madonna lily, however the shape of this symbol more accurately resembles that of a flag iris or Iris florentina.

Before 1999, the Madonna lily was the provincial flower of Quebec, probably as a reference to the fleurs-de-lis on the flag of Quebec. However, this was criticized as the plant is not native to Quebec, and in 1999 it was replaced by the blue flag iris, which is native to the province.

== Culinary uses ==
In Taiwan, both the flower and bulbs are used as food, as are the other related species: L. brownii var. viridulum, L. lancifolium and L. pumilum.

== Toxicity in pets ==
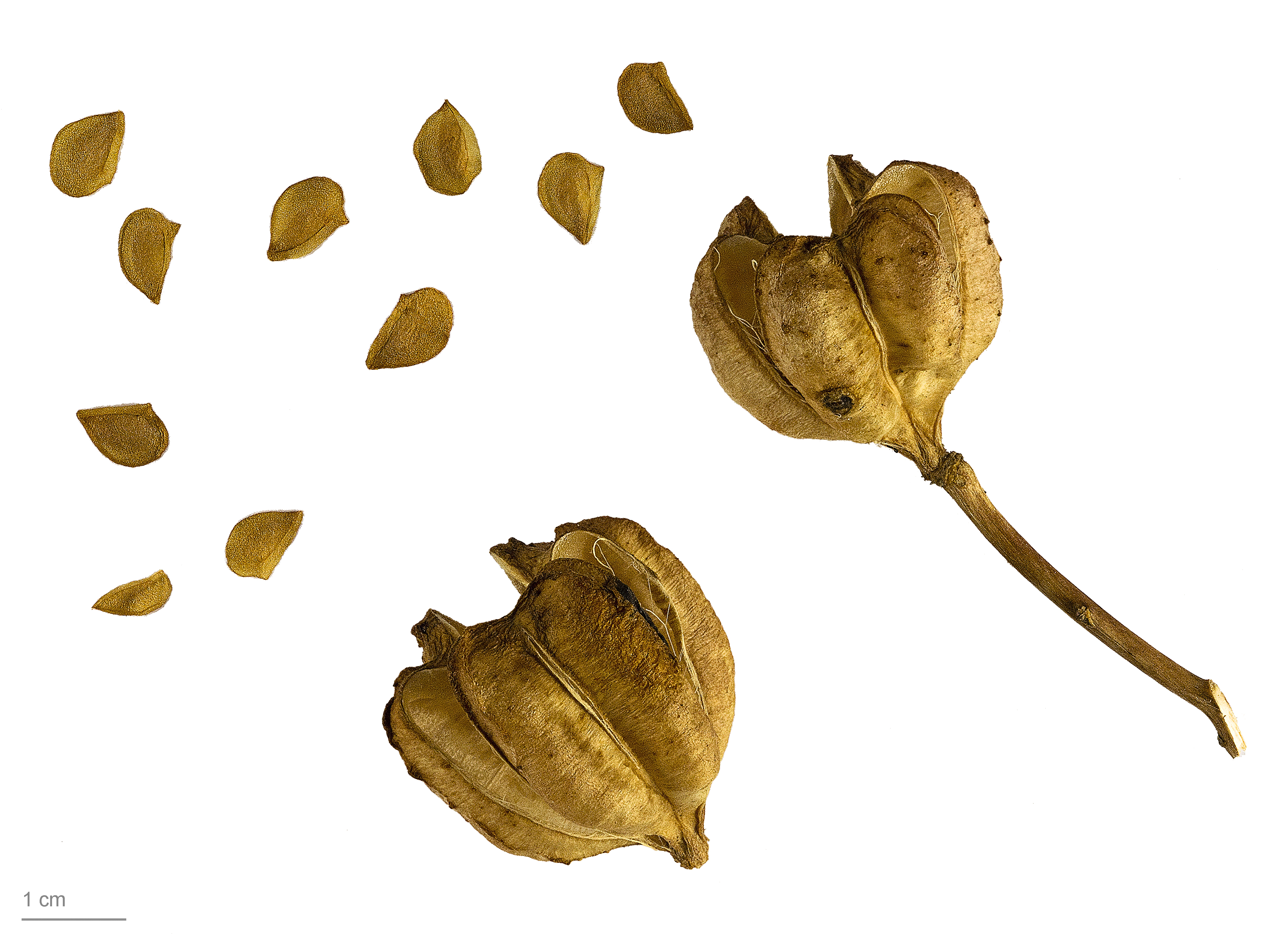
Seed pods and seeds - MHNT

Cats are extremely sensitive to the toxicity of the plant and ingestion is often fatal. Households and gardens which are visited by cats are strongly advised against keeping this plant or placing dried flowers where a cat may brush against them and become dusted with pollen which they then consume while cleaning. Suspected cases require urgent veterinary attention. Rapid treatment with activated charcoal, and/or induced vomiting, can reduce the amount of toxin absorbed. Treatment is time-sensitive, so in some cases vets may advise doing it at home. A vet will give the cat large amounts of fluid by IV, which can reduce the damage to the kidneys, and thus increase the chances of survival.

== Gallery ==
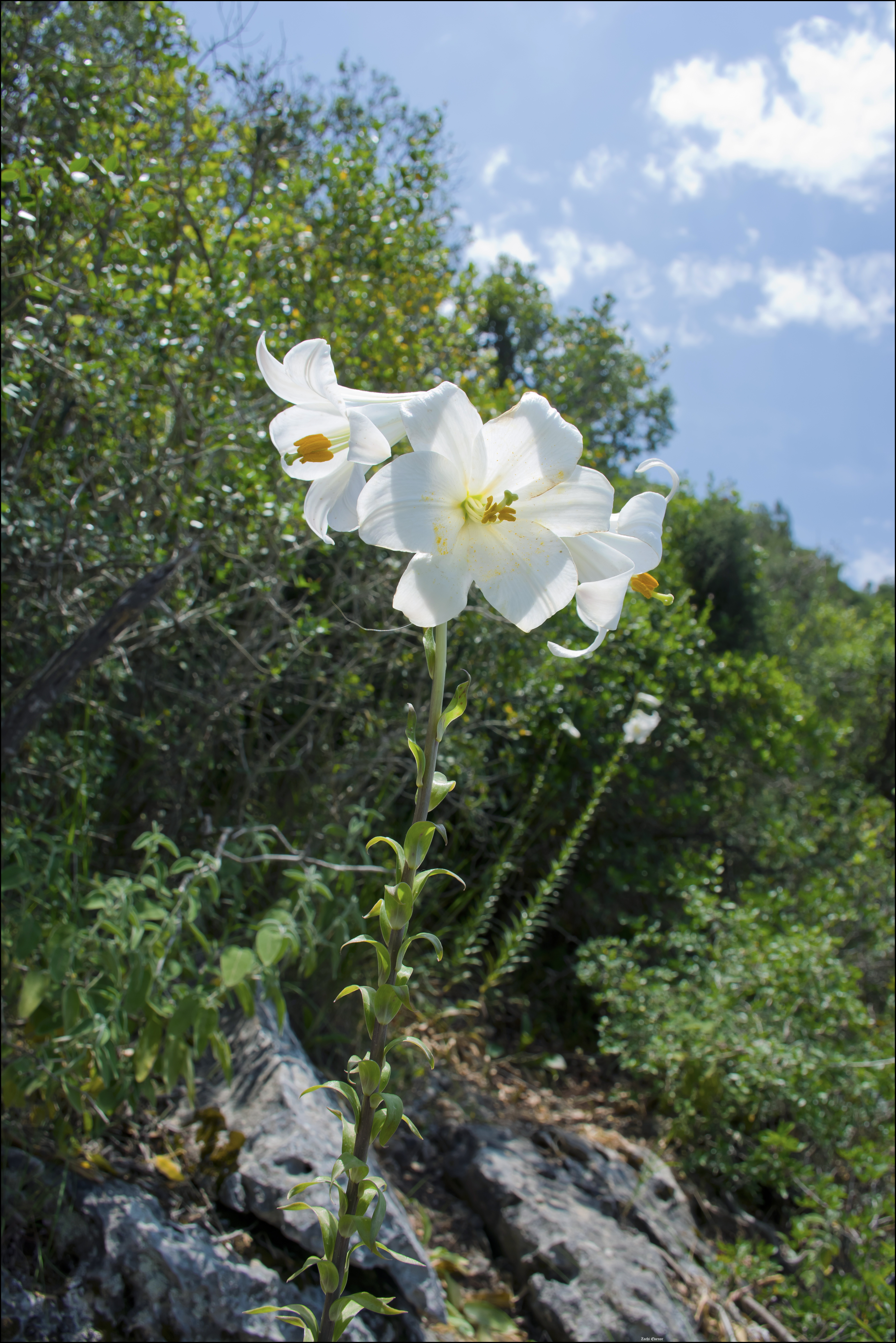
On Mount Carmel, Israel

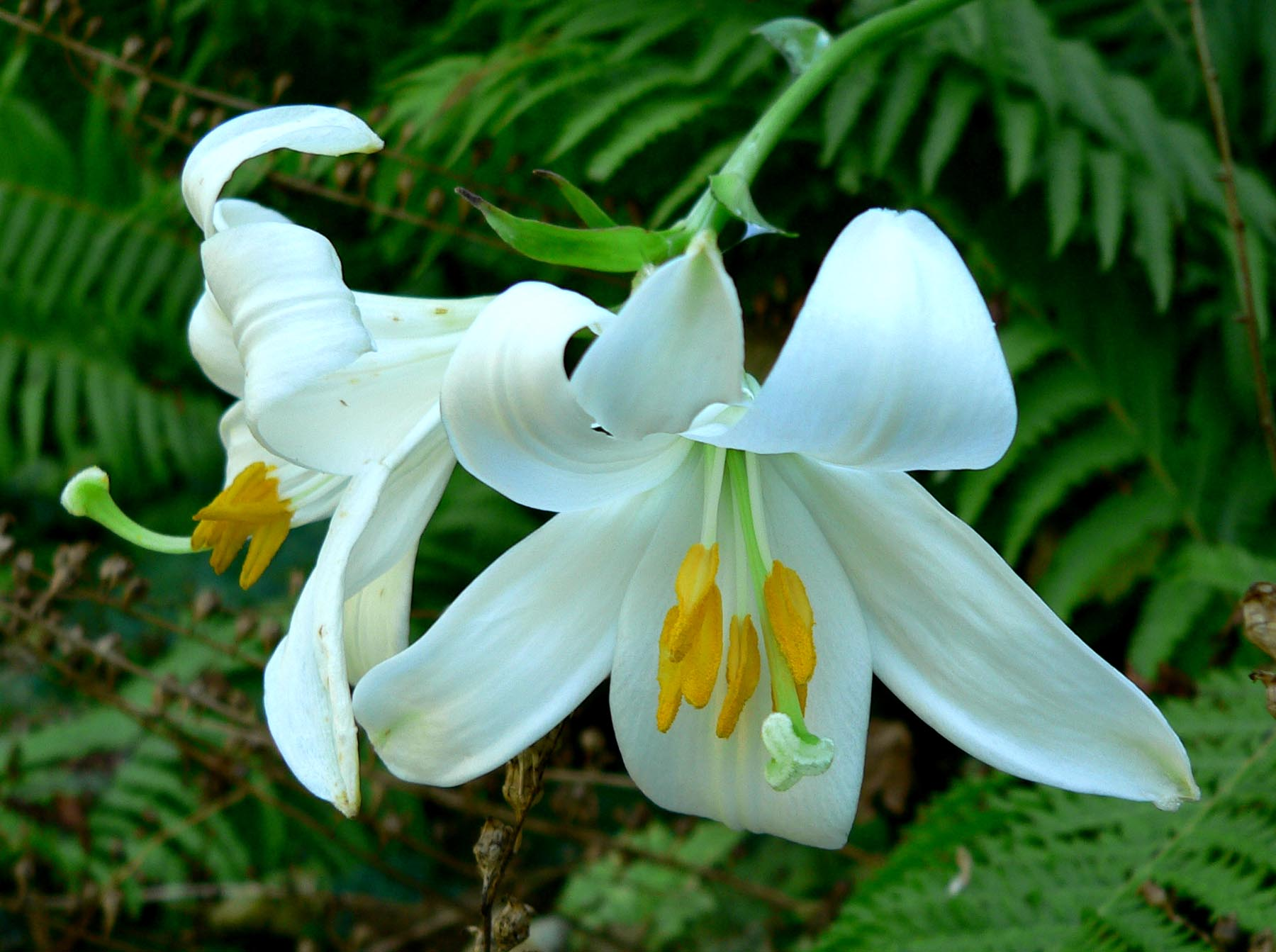
In the VanDusen Botanical Garden, Vancouver, British Columbia, Canada
