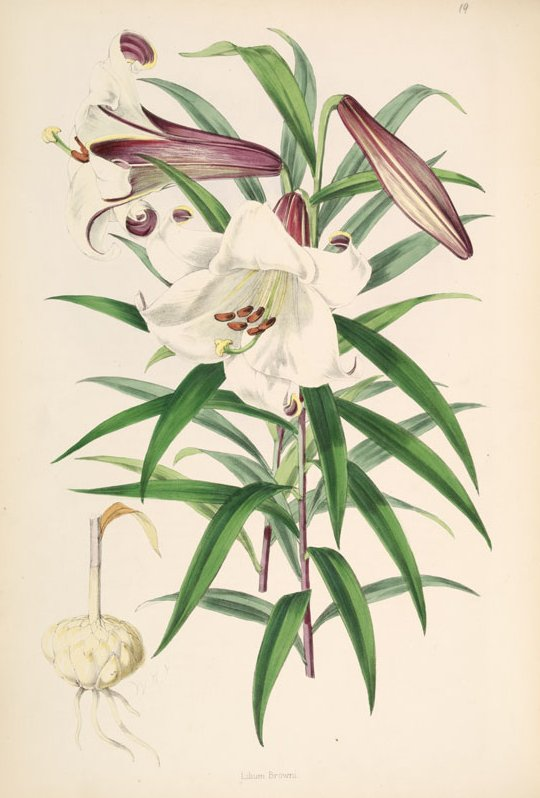
- Lilium brownii var. brownii

Scientific classification
- Kingdom: Plantae
- Clade: Tracheophytes
- Clade: Angiosperms
- Clade: Monocots
- Order: Liliales
- Family: Liliaceae
- Subfamily: Lilioideae
- Tribe: Lilieae
- Genus: Lilium
- Species: L. brownii

Binomial name
- Lilium brownii F.E.Br. ex Miellez

= Lilium brownii =

Species of lily

Lilium brownii is a species of lily native to mainland China, Hong Kong, Kinmen and Matsu Islands as well as northern and central Vietnam and Kachin of Myanmar. Its common names include Hong Kong lily and Brown's lily.

== Botanical varieties ==
There are two accepted varieties of L. brownii:

- L. brownii var. brownii: leaves lanceolate to linear, known as "wild lily" (野百合) in China.
- Lilium brownii var. chloraster (Baker) Baker
- L. brownii var. viridulum: leaves oblanceolate to obovate, known as "(common) lily" (百合) in China. This variety is often cultivated for its edible bulbs.
