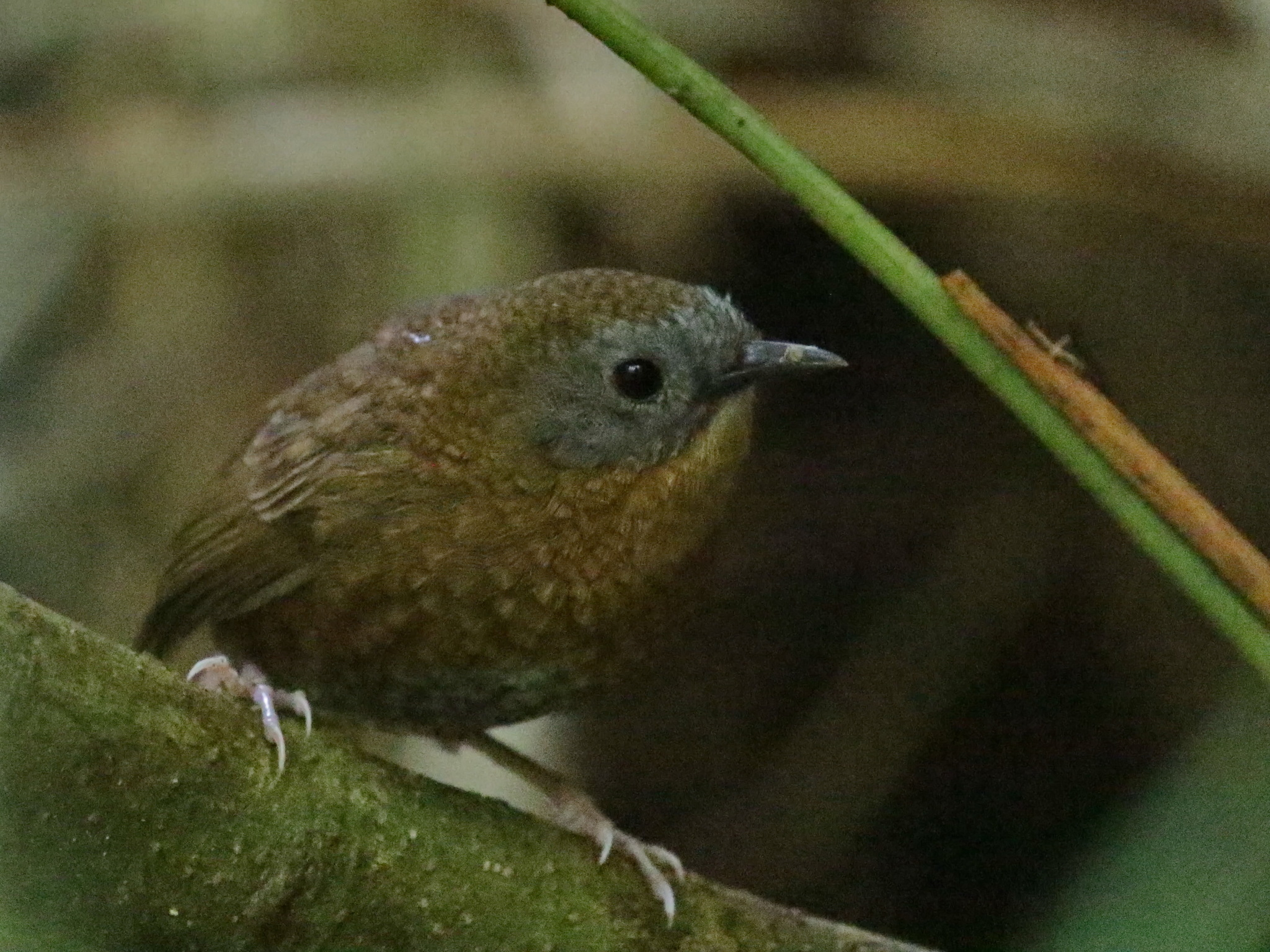

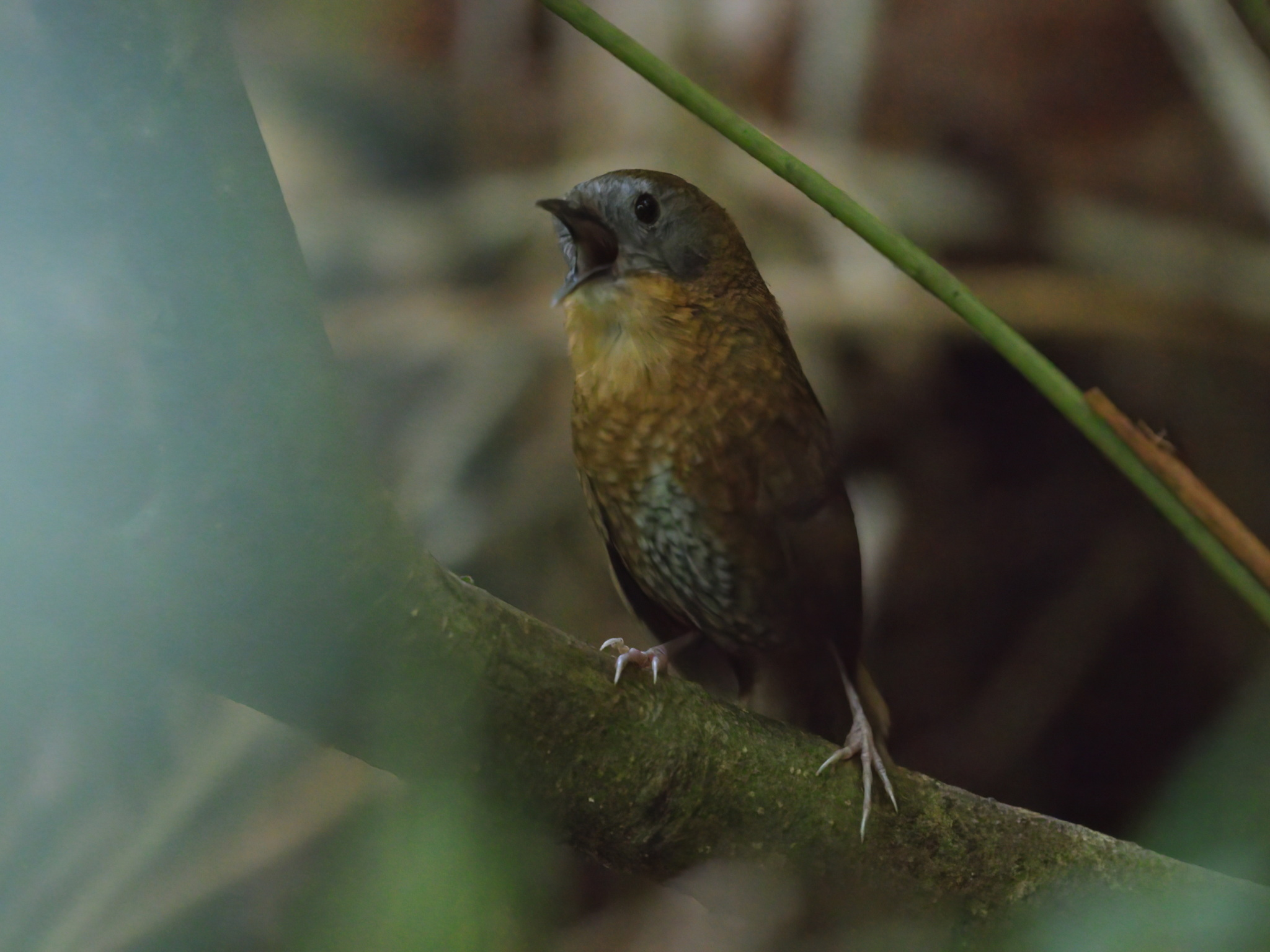

Conservation status
- Least Concern (IUCN 3.1)

Scientific classification
- Kingdom: Animalia
- Phylum: Chordata
- Class: Aves
- Order: Passeriformes
- Family: Timaliidae
- Genus: Spelaeornis
- Species: S. reptatus

Binomial name
- Spelaeornis reptatus (Bingham, 1903)
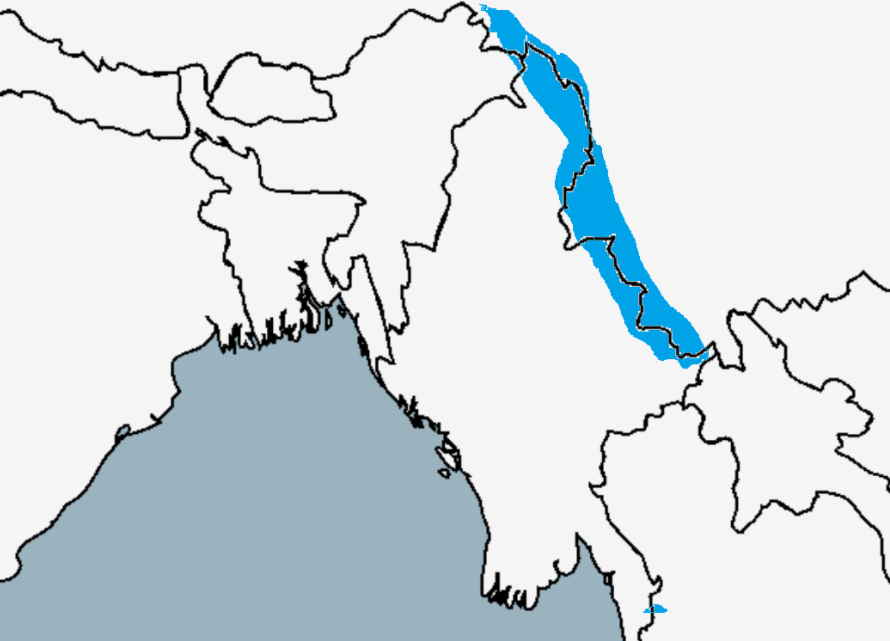
- Range of Spelaeornis reptatus

Synonyms
- Spelaeornis chocolatinus reptatus

= Grey-bellied wren-babbler =

Species of bird

The grey-bellied wren-babbler (Spelaeornis reptatus) is a bird species in the family Timaliidae. It was until recently considered a subspecies of the long-tailed wren-babbler; the IUCN, for example, started recognizing it as distinct species in 2008.

It is found in China (Yunnan), India (Arunachal Pradesh), Myanmar, and Thailand. Its natural habitat is subtropical moist montane forest. It is classified as a Species of Least Concern by the IUCN.

== Lisu wren-babbler ==
In March 2022, a possibly new species of bird was discovered by Praveen J., Deepu Karrethudatu, and others. It was discovered on the Mugaphi Hills in Namdapha National Park.

It is different both morphologically and acoustically from S. reptatus. It is identified by the name "Lisu Wren-Babbler".

It has chocolate-brown upperparts with a clean white throat patch. This is the second undescribed possibly new species of bird in India, after the Great Nicobar Crake.
