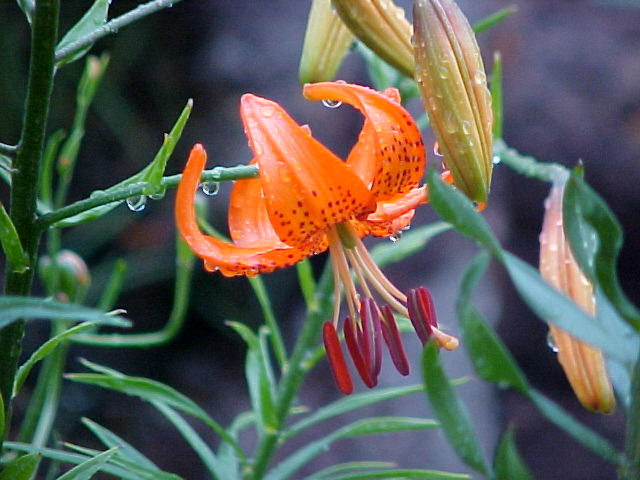

Scientific classification
- Kingdom: Plantae
- Clade: Tracheophytes
- Clade: Angiosperms
- Clade: Monocots
- Order: Liliales
- Family: Liliaceae
- Subfamily: Lilioideae
- Tribe: Lilieae
- Genus: Lilium
- Species: L. davidii

Binomial name
- Lilium davidii Duch. ex Elwes

Synonyms
- Lilium biondii Baroni; Lilium cavaleriei H.Lév. & Vaniot; Lilium chinense Baroni; Lilium sutchuenense Franch.; Lilium thayerae E.H.Wilson; Lilium willmottiae E.H.Wilson

= Lilium davidii =

Species of lily

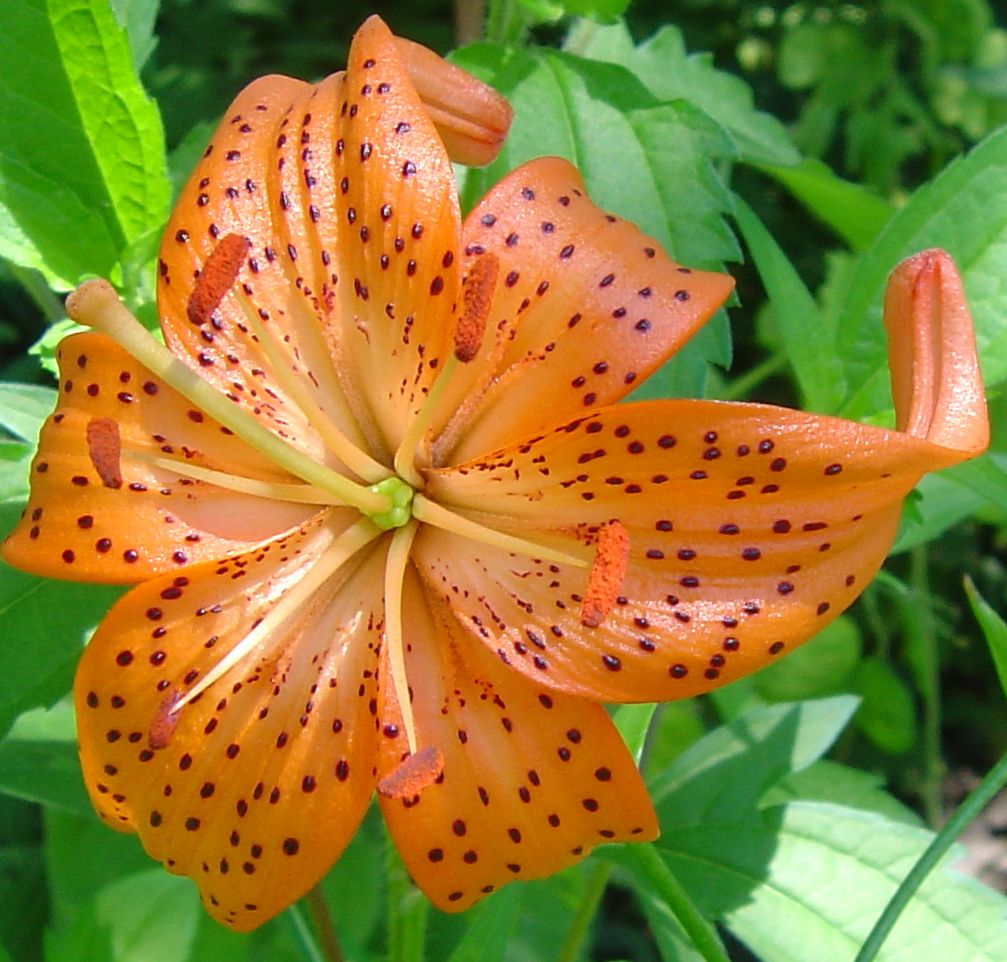
L. davidii var. wilmottiae

Lilium davidii is an Asian species of plants in the lily family, native to mountainous areas of Assam, Manipur, Arunachal Pradesh, Tibet, Bhutan, Hubei, Shaanxi, Sichuan, Guizhou, and Yunnan.

Lilium davidii grows up to 1.5m high, and bears up to about 20 unscented flowers with recurved tepals (bent backwards), orange or reddish orange, from July to August.

The plant is cultivated for its edible bulb. It is a stem-rooting lily (adventitious roots emerging above the bulb) that also forms bulbils.

The species is named for French missionary and naturalist Armand David (1826-1900).
