= Armand David =

French Lazarist missionary (1826–1900)

The Reverend Armand David CM
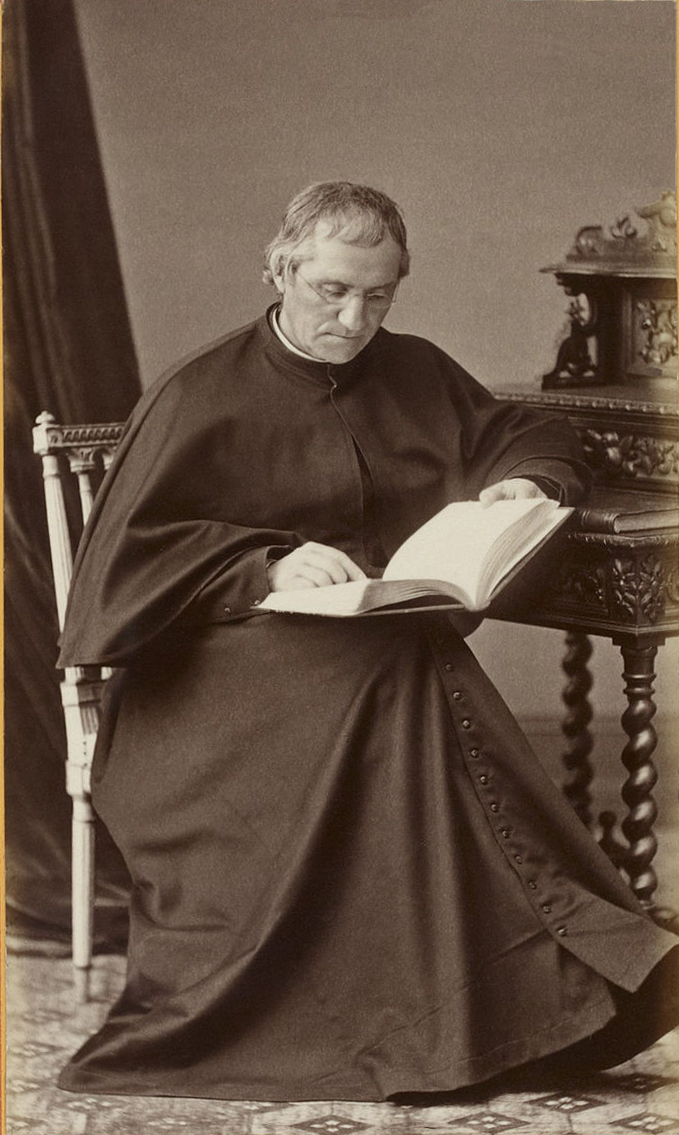
- David in 1884
- Church: Catholic Church

Orders
- Ordination: 1851

Personal details
- Born: Jean-Pierre-Armand David; 7 September 1826 Espelette, France
- Died: 10 November 1900 (aged 74) Paris, France
- Denomination: Roman Catholicism
- Occupation: Biologist
- Scientific career
- Other name: Père David
- Known for: Documenting species of Chinese flora and fauna exotic to Europe
- Fields: Botany, zoology
- Author abbrev. (botany): David
- Author abbrev. (zoology): David

Armand David, CM (7 September 1826, Espelette – 10 November 1900, Paris) was a Lazarist missionary Catholic priest as well as a zoologist and a botanist from the French Basque Country.

Several species, such as Père David's deer, are named after him, with Père David being French for Father David.

== Biography ==
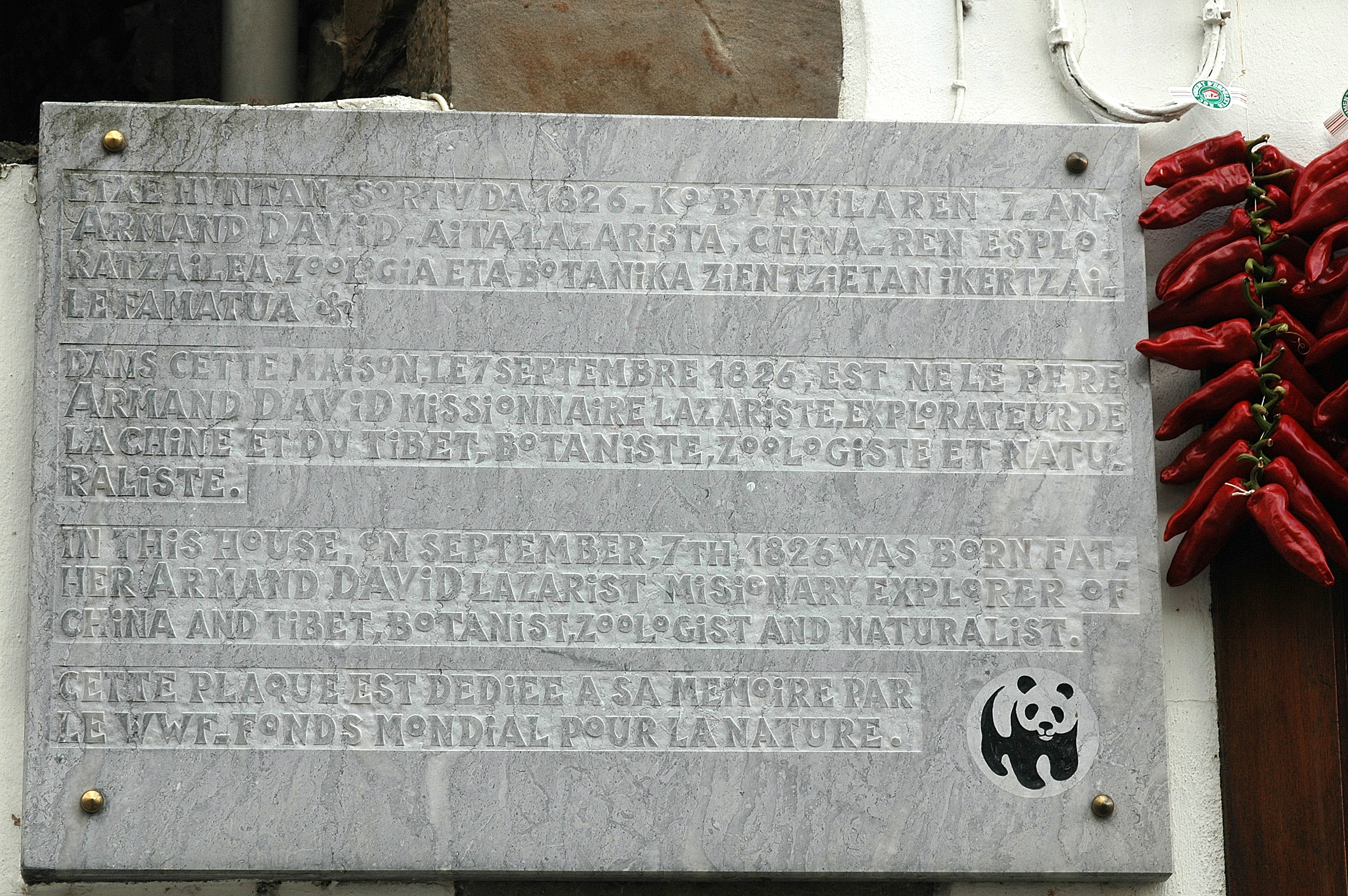
Multilingual plate at his birthplace from the World Wildlife Fund, with text in Basque, French and English.

David was born in Espelette near Bayonne, in the north of Basque Country, in Pyrénées-Atlantiques département of France; he was one of three sons born to a doctor and magistrate.

He entered the Congregation of the Mission in 1848; by this time he had already displayed great fondness for the natural sciences and taught science at Savana College in Italy. Ordained in 1851, he was in 1862 sent to Peking, where he began a collection of material for a museum of natural history, mainly zoological, but in which botany, geology, and palaeontology were also well represented.

Between 1872 and 1876, he travelled from Beijing to Hunan Province, then to Xian and along the River Han; by 1883, he had also travelled to Tunisia and Istanbul.

At the request of the French government, important specimens from his collection were sent to Paris and aroused the greatest interest. The Jardin des Plantes commissioned him to undertake scientific journeys through China to make further collections. He succeeded in obtaining many specimens of hitherto unknown animals and plants, and the value of his comprehensive collections for the advance of systematic zoology and especially for the advancement of animal geography received universal recognition from the scientific community at Paris in April, 1888. He had found in China all together 200 species of wild animals, of which 63 were hitherto unknown to zoologists, and 807 species of birds, 65 of which had not been described before. He made a large collection of reptiles, amphibians, and fishes and handed it over to specialists for further study. Also, a large number of moths and insects, many of them hitherto unknown, were brought to the museum of the Jardin des Plantes. What Father David's scientific journeys meant for botany may be inferred from the fact that among the rhododendrons which he collected no less than fifty-two new species were found, and in the genus Primula about forty, while the Western Mountains of China furnished an even greater number of hitherto unknown species of gentian.

The most notable of the animals 'found' by David, which were hitherto unknown to Europeans, were the giant panda in Baoxing County and Père David's deer. The latter had disappeared with the exception of a few preserved in the gardens of the emperor of China, but David succeeded in securing a specimen and sent it to Europe. David also sent back the first emerald ash borer specimen. In the midst of his work as a naturalist Father David did not neglect his missionary labours, and was noted for his careful devotion to his religious duties and for his obedience to every detail of his order's rules.

== Eponymy ==
The genus Davidia (dove tree), which he discovered in western China in 1868, is named after him. Other plants named after him include Buddleja davidii and Ulmus davidiana, the David's Elm, and also Lilium davidii. The fish Sarcocheilichthys davidi was named in his honour by Henri Émile Sauvage in 1878, because Père David collected the type specimen. Père David's deer (Elaphurus davidianus) was likewise named after him by Alphonse Milne-Edwards.

Père David's Rat Snake (Elaphe davidi) was named in his honour by Henri Émile Sauvage in 1884.

=== Eponymous taxa ===
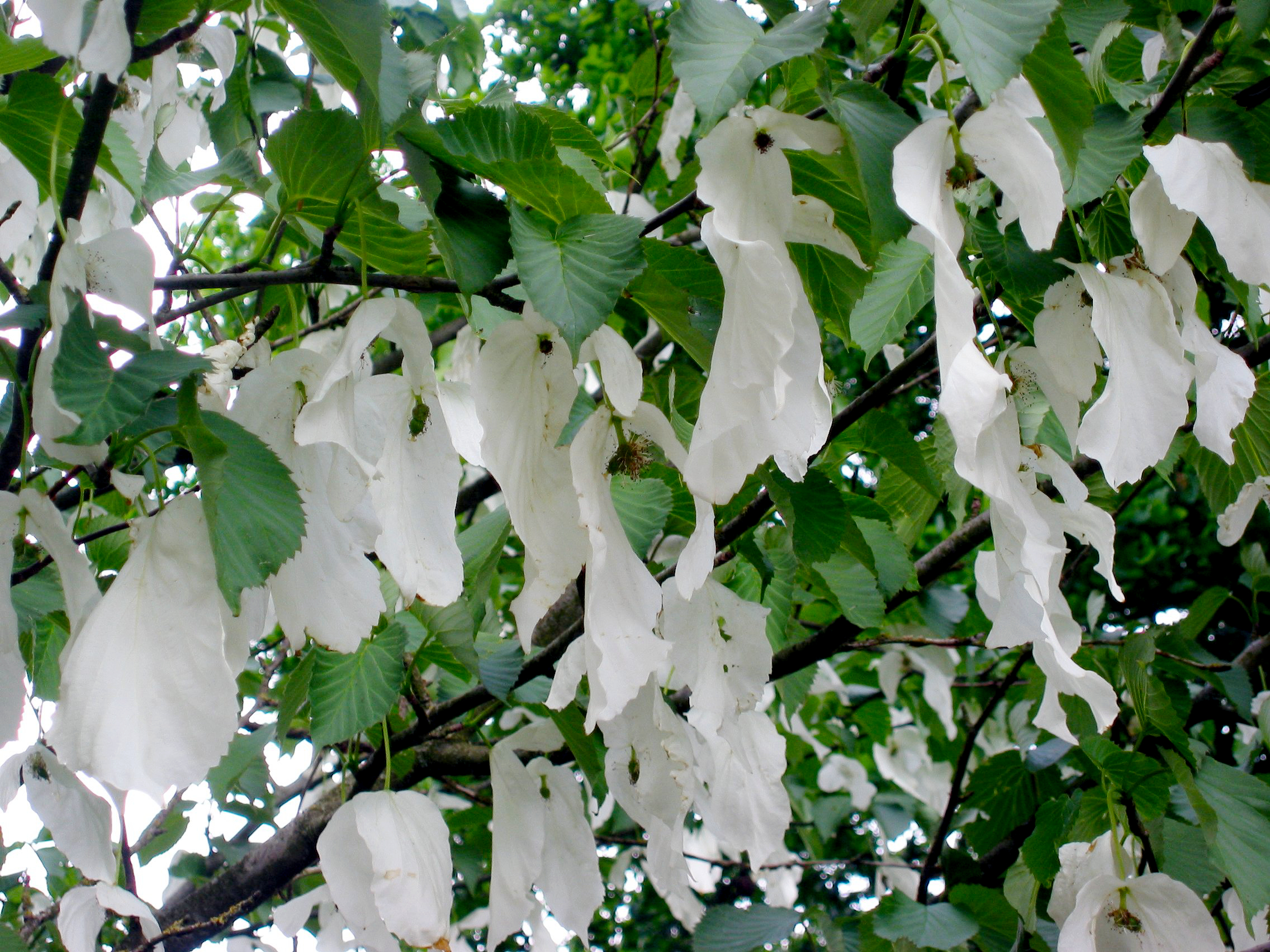
Davidia involucrata in flower

- Père David's deer
- Père David's laughingthrush
- Père David's mole
- Père David's owl
- Père David's rock squirrel
- Père David's snowfinch
- Père David's tit
- Père David's vole
- Andrias davidianus
- Acer davidii
- Buddleja davidii
- Clematis armandii
- Davidia involucrata
- Gentiana davidii
- Pinus armandii
- Viburnum davidii

== Honours ==
Honours given to David include;

- Admitted to the Paris Academie des Sciences (1872)
- Gold Medal of the Société Geographique, the Réunion de Savants and the Société de France (1896)
- Cross of the Legion d'honneur (1896).

== See also ==
- Catholic Church in Sichuan
- Catholic Church in China
- Jesuit China missions
- List of Roman Catholic scientist-clerics

=== Catholic missionaries in China ===
- Michel Benoist
- Giuseppe Castiglione
- Armand David
- Matteo Ricci
- Johann Adam Schall von Bell
- Ferdinand Verbiest
- St. Francis Xavier
