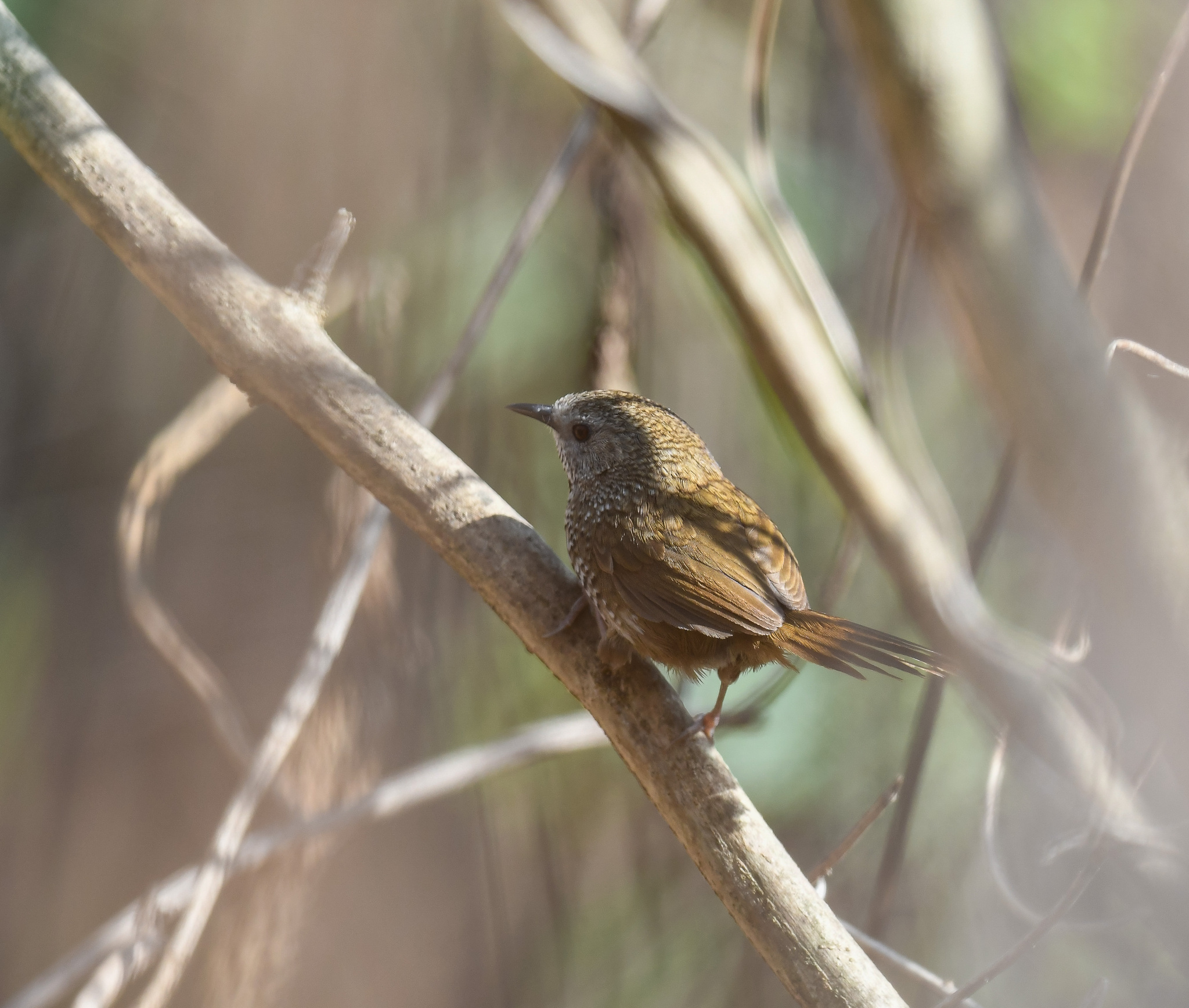

Conservation status
- Least Concern (IUCN 3.1)

Scientific classification
- Kingdom: Animalia
- Phylum: Chordata
- Class: Aves
- Order: Passeriformes
- Family: Timaliidae
- Genus: Spelaeornis
- Species: S. oatesi

Binomial name
- Spelaeornis oatesi (Rippon, 1904)

Synonyms
- Spelaeornis chocolatinus oatesi

= Chin Hills wren-babbler =

Species of bird

The Chin Hills wren-babbler (Spelaeornis oatesi) is a bird species in the family Timaliidae. It was until recently considered a subspecies of the long-tailed wren-babbler; the IUCN for example started recognizing it as distinct species in 2008.

It is found in India and Myanmar. Its natural habitat are subtropical or tropical moist montane forests. It is therefore classified as a Species of Least Concern by the IUCN.
