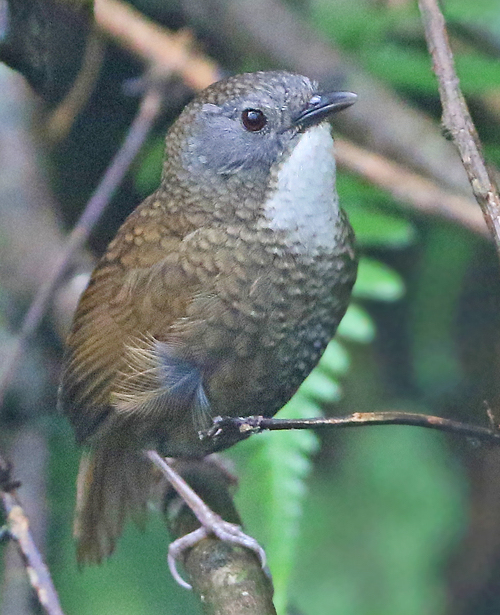

Conservation status
- Vulnerable (IUCN 3.1)

Scientific classification
- Kingdom: Animalia
- Phylum: Chordata
- Class: Aves
- Order: Passeriformes
- Family: Timaliidae
- Genus: Spelaeornis
- Species: S. kinneari

Binomial name
- Spelaeornis kinneari Delacour & Jabouille, 1930

Synonyms
- Spelaeornis chocolatinus kinneari

= Pale-throated wren-babbler =

Species of bird

The pale-throated wren-babbler (Spelaeornis kinneari) is a bird species in the family Timaliidae. It was until recently considered a subspecies of the long-tailed wren-babbler; the IUCN for example started recognizing it as distinct species in 2008. It is only found in Southwestern China and Vietnam.

Its natural habitat are subtropical or tropical moist montane forests. This is one of the common and widespread taxa in the Long-tailed wren-babbler species complex. However, due to its declining population & reduced habitat, it is currently classified as a Vulnerable species by the IUCN.
