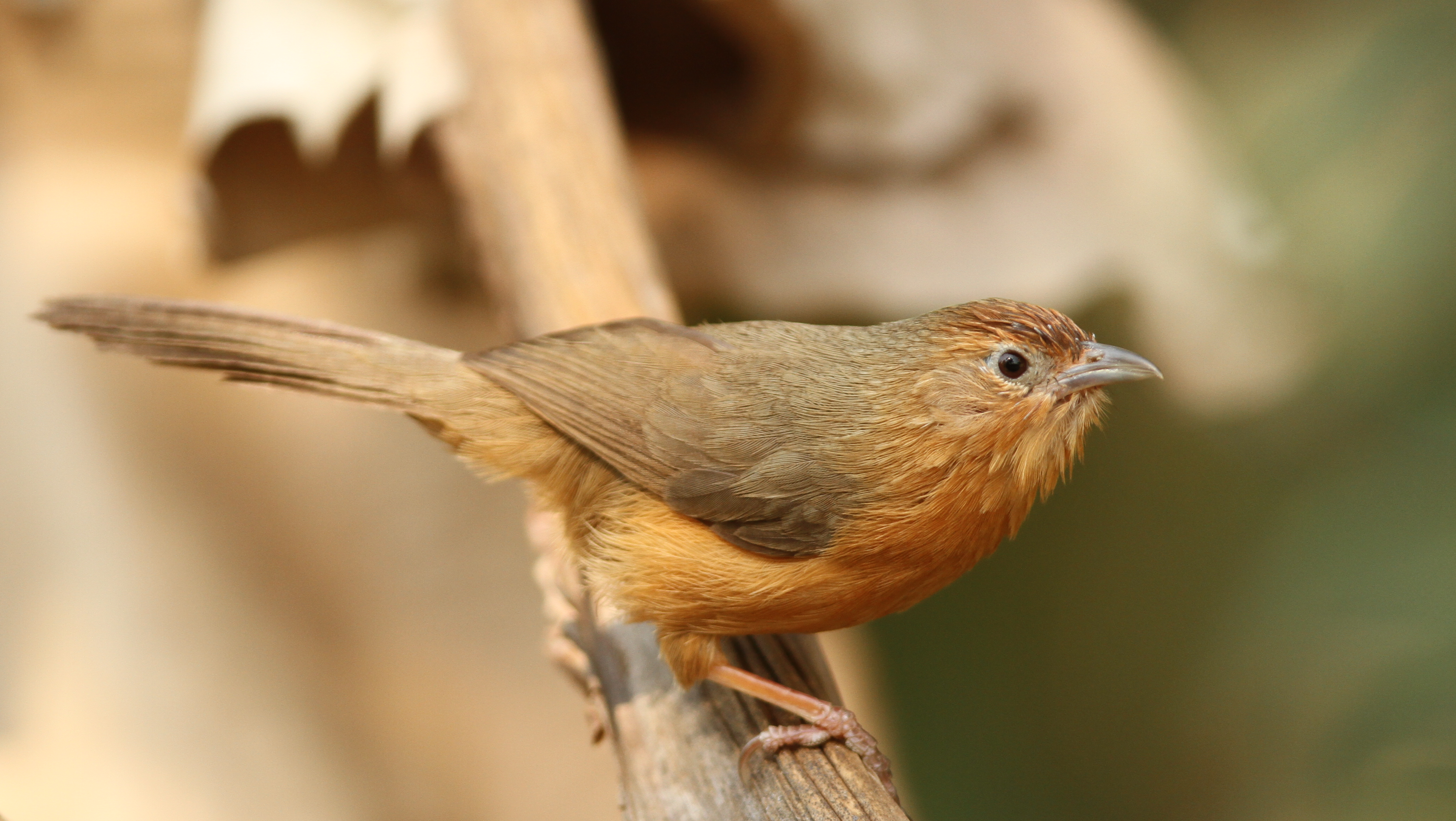
- D. hyperythra hyperythra from Satpura National Park Calls recorded in southern India

Conservation status
- Least Concern (IUCN 3.1)

Scientific classification
- Kingdom: Animalia
- Phylum: Chordata
- Class: Aves
- Order: Passeriformes
- Family: Timaliidae
- Genus: Dumetia
- Species: D. hyperythra

Binomial name
- Dumetia hyperythra (Franklin, 1831)

Synonyms
- Malacocercus albogularis Blyth. 1847; Timalia hyperythra Franklin, 1831

= Tawny-bellied babbler =

Species of bird

The tawny-bellied babbler (Dumetia hyperythra) also known in older Indian works as the rufous-bellied babbler is a small babbler that forages in small groups in low scrub forests. Like other members of the large Old World babbler family they are passerine birds characterised by soft fluffy plumage. There are three subspecies within the Indian subcontinent. The nominate hyperythra found in northern and eastern India is uniformly brown underneath while albogularis of the western Indian peninsula is white throated. The population in Sri Lanka, phillipsi, is also white throated but is paler underneath and has a larger bill.

== Description ==
- - - - - - Dumetia
          - Rhopocichla atriceps
        - - Timalia pileata
          - Macronus gularis
      - - - Macronus ptilosus
          - Macronus striaticeps
        - Stachyris (in part)
  - - Pomatorhinus
    - Xiphirhynchus
    - Stachyris (in part)

Relationships within the Timaliinae based on a 2012 study.

The tawny-bellied babbler is a small babbler at 13 cm including its long round-tipped tail. The outer tail feathers are about half the length of the central tail feather. It is dark brown above and orange-buff below, with a rufous grey crown. The feathers on the forehead are stiff and the tail has cross rays and is otherwise olive brown. The throat is white in adults of the populations of peninsular India and Sri Lanka. The Sri Lankan population, however, has a larger and heavier beak and paler underparts.

The population on Mt. Abu is white-throated with chestnut feathers on the crown (appearing capped, as opposed to the chestnut being only on the forehead) having pale shafts. It has been proposed as a subspecies abuensis but is more often included in albogularis. Another variant form first described from Khandala Ghats as navarroi is also usually included within the range of albogularis.

== Taxonomy and systematics ==
The species was first described by James Franklin in 1831, placed in the genus Timalia. The genus Dumetia was established by Blyth in 1852 who saw differences between it and other genera. The genus characters were in the distribution of the stiff feathers on the forehead and the shape of the bill. Modern classifications based on DNA sequences note that the species is a sister of the dark-fronted babbler and the chestnut-capped babbler. It is part of the subfamily Timaliinae.

== Distribution and habitat ==
The tawny-bellied babbler is found from Nepal and north-central India to Sri Lanka. The populations in India are all intergrading and no disjunct distributions exist. Its natural habitat is scrub and tall grassland. In Sri Lanka it is found in the hills up to about 1500 m above sea level.

== Behaviour ==
The tawny-bellied babbler builds its nest in a low bush, concealed in dense masses of foliage. The nest is a ball of long woven leaves of bamboo or grasses. They breed from May to September mostly during the rains. The normal clutch is three or four eggs. Both parents incubate the eggs. In Sri Lanka they are thought to raise more than one brood. Like most babblers, it is not migratory, and has short rounded wings and a weak flight. A prenuptial moult takes place in January–February in the southern population. It feeds mainly on insects but also takes nectar from flowers of Bombax and Erythrina. They produce cheeping, twittering or harsh chattering notes while foraging in bushes. The name Pandi Jitta, literally "pig bird" in Telugu, refers to its habit of foraging under dense shrubbery in the manner of pigs.

Banded bay cuckoos have been known to lay their eggs in the nests of tawny-bellied babblers. Unidentified haematozoa placed in the genus Leucocytozoon have been recorded from the blood of the species. A specimen that died in captivity was found to have microfilariae in addition to haematozoa.

== Gallery ==
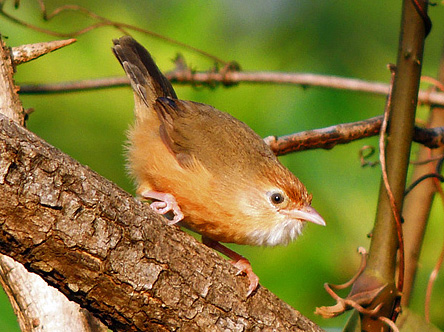
D. h. albogularis with whitish throat from western peninsular India

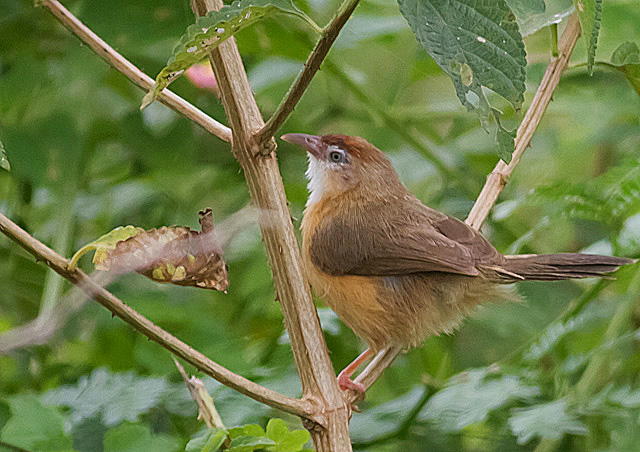
D. h. phillipsi of Sri Lanka
