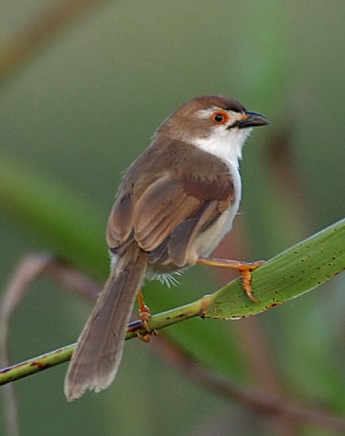
- Yellow-eyed babbler, Chrysomma sinense

Scientific classification
- Kingdom: Animalia
- Phylum: Chordata
- Class: Aves
- Order: Passeriformes
- Family: Paradoxornithidae
- Genus: Chrysomma; Blyth, 1843

Type species
- Timalia hypoleuca Franklin 1831

Species
- See text

= Chrysomma =

Genus of birds

Chrysomma is a songbird genus. It is quite closely related to the parrotbills, and is therefore a member of the family Paradoxornithidae.

== Taxonomy ==
The genus Chrysomma was introduced in 1843 by the English zoologist Edward Blyth. He designated the type species as Timalia hypoleuca Franklin 1831. This taxon is now one of subspecies of the yellow-eyed babbler. The genus name combines the Ancient Greek khrusos meaning "gold" and omma meaning "eye".

The genus contains two species:

Genus Chrysomma – Franklin, 1831 – two species
Common name	Scientific name and subspecies	Range	Size and ecology	IUCN status and estimated population
Yellow-eyed babbler	Chrysomma sinense (Gmelin, JF, 1789) Three subspecies: C. s. nasale (Legge, 1879); C. s. hypoleucum (Franklin, 1831); C. s. sinense (Gmelin, JF, 1789)	Burma, Laos and Thailand.	Size: Habitat: Diet:	LC
Jerdon's babbler	Chrysomma altirostre (Jerdon, 1862) Three subspecies: C. a. altirostre; C. a. griseigularis; C. a. scindicum	Nepal to northeastern India	Size: Habitat: Diet:	VU

The rufous-tailed babbler was formerly placed in this genus but has been moved to the monotypic Moupinia.
