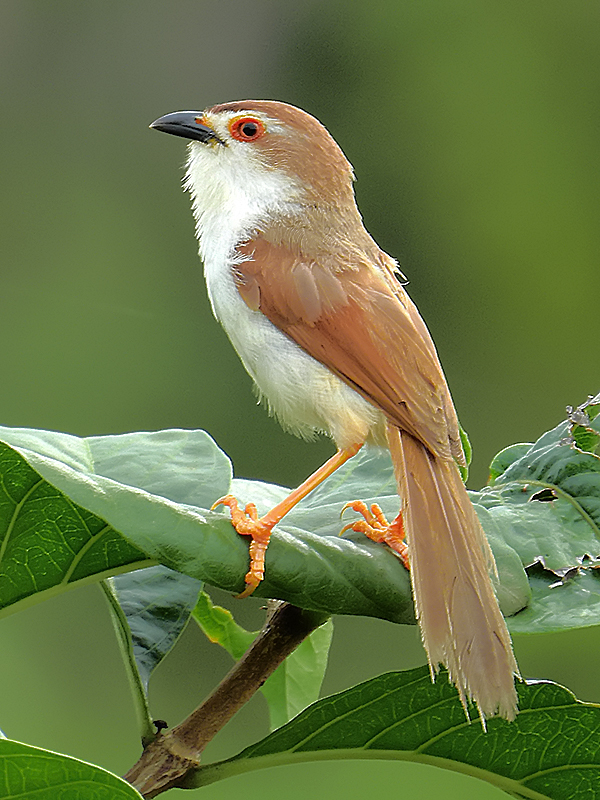
- Mangaon, Maharashtra, India

Conservation status
- Least Concern (IUCN 3.1)

Scientific classification
- Kingdom: Animalia
- Phylum: Chordata
- Class: Aves
- Order: Passeriformes
- Family: Paradoxornithidae
- Genus: Chrysomma
- Species: C. sinense

Binomial name
- Chrysomma sinense (Gmelin, JF, 1789)

Synonyms
- Pyctorhis sinensis

= Yellow-eyed babbler =

Species of bird

The yellow-eyed babbler (Chrysomma sinense) is a passerine bird native to South and Southeast Asia. It inhabits shrubland, grassland and wetland habitats. On the IUCN Red List, it is listed as Least Concern because of its wide distribution and stable population.

Its common name refers to the traditional placement in the Old World babbler family Timaliidae although the genus Chrysomma forms a clade along with the parrotbills within the family Paradoxornithidae.

== Taxonomy ==
The yellow-eyed babbler was formally described in 1789 by the German naturalist Johann Friedrich Gmelin in his revised and expanded edition of Carl Linnaeus's Systema Naturae. He placed it with the tits and manakins in the genus Parus and coined the binomial name Parus sinensis. Gmelin based his account on the "Chinese titmouse" that had been described in 1783 by the English ornithologist John Latham in his book A General Synopsis of Birds. Gmelin gave the type locality as China but it is now restricted to the province of Guangdong. The yellow-eyed babbler is now placed together with Jerdon's babbler in the genus Chrysomma that was introduced in 1843 by the English zoologist Edward Blyth.

Three subspecies are recognised:

- C. s. nasale (Legge, 1879) – Sri Lanka
- C. s. hypoleucum (Franklin, 1831) – Pakistan, India (except northeast) and south Nepal
- C. s. sinense (Gmelin, JF, 1789) – northeast India to south China and Vietnam

== Description ==
The yellow-eyed babbler is about 18 centimetres (7.1 in) long with a short bill and a long graduated tail. The body above is brown and the wings are cinnamon coloured. The lores and supercilium are white and the rim of the eye is orange-yellow in adult birds. The beak is black. The underside is whitish buff. The central tail feathers are about twice as long as the outermost. The sexes are indistinguishable in the field.

Within its wide distribution range there are some differences in plumage between populations that have been considered as subspecies. The nominate subspecies is found in Burma, Laos and Thailand. The population in Sri Lanka, nasale, has black nostrils and a stouter bill. The population across much of India, hypoleucum, has yellow nostrils (as with the nominate subspecies) and is paler in plumage. The population in the northeast Duars of India has an almost slaty crown and darker wings and has been called as saturatius or saturatior but this is considered as clinal variation and included in the nominate population.

== Distribution and habitat ==
The range of the yellow-eyed babbler extends from Pakistan through India, Nepal, Sri Lanka to Bangladesh, Myanmar, Thailand, Laos, Viet Nam and China.

The usual habitat is grassy or thorny scrub both in dry and wet regions as well as farmland. It occurs mainly on the plains but also in the lower hills up to 1200 m. It is absent in the dense forest region of the Western Ghats and occurs only on the eastern edges or in gaps such as at Palghat.

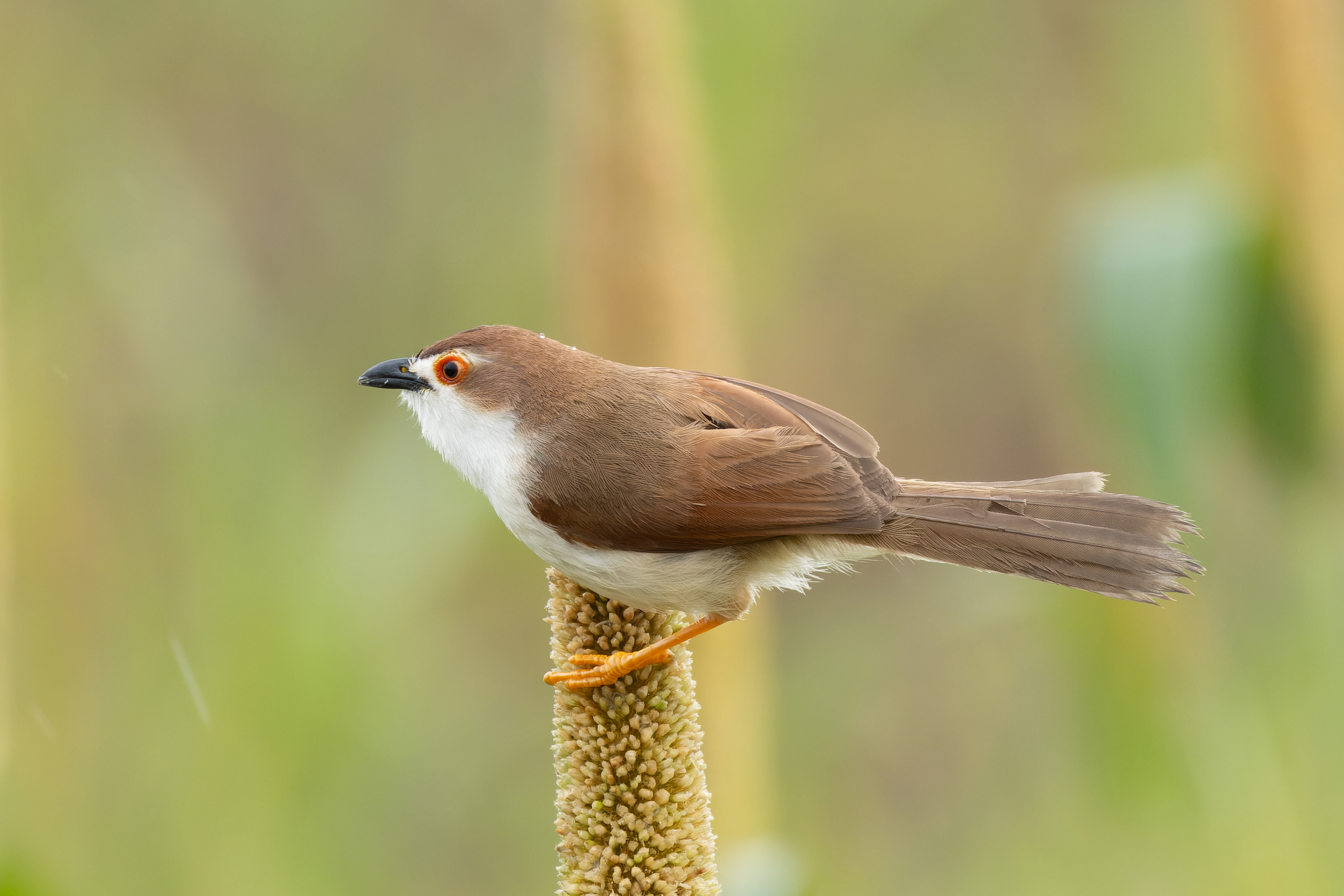
Yellow-eyed Babbler (Chrysomma sinense perched on Pearl millet (cenchrus americanus) in Bhigwan, Maharashtra, India.

== Behaviour and ecology ==
Measurements

hypoleucum
Length		140 mm (5.5 in)
Culmen	♂	14–15 mm (0.6–0.6 in)
	♀	13–16 mm (0.5–0.6 in)
Wing	♂	62–70 mm (2.4–2.8 in)
	♀	62–70 mm (2.4–2.8 in)
Tail	♂	73–102 mm (2.9–4.0 in)
	♀	78–100 mm (3.1–3.9 in)
Head		31–33 mm (1.2–1.3 in)
Tarsus	♂	22–27 mm (0.9–1.1 in)
	♀	25–27 mm (1.0–1.1 in)
Weight		15–21 g (0.5–0.7 oz)

nasale
Length		142–162 mm (5.6–6.4 in)
Culmen		14–15 mm (0.6–0.6 in)
Wing		63–69 mm (2.5–2.7 in)
Tail		70–86 mm (2.8–3.4 in)
Head		33–35 mm (1.3–1.4 in)
Tarsus		24–26 mm (0.9–1.0 in)

Like babblers, these birds are usually seen in small groups of five to fifteen, especially in the non-breeding season. They are usually found inside bushes, emerging up to the top of a stem and then diving back into cover to forage. They feed mainly on insects but take berries (Lantana and Salvadora) as well as nectar. When capturing insects, they may hold them down with their feet. The group constantly produces a series of cheeping or churring calls. During the breeding season, mainly the southwest monsoon (June to August) but sometimes during the receding monsoon, the song is a strong whistling twee-twee-ta-whit-chu, often delivered from a prominent perch. The colour of the inside of the mouth is said to turn from orange-brown to black during the breeding season. They appear to nest cooperatively, the nest being a deep cone made with grass and lined with fine fibre. The nest is wedged between upright stems, the vertical stems being incorporated into the wall of the nest. The outside of the nest is well covered in cobwebs. The usual clutch is four but varies from three to five. The eggs are pinkish white with chestnut-red patches. Both parents take part in incubation and feeding the young. The eggs hatch after about 15–16 days and the young birds fledge after about 13 days. Adult birds have been seen feigning injury presumably to detract predators. Birds roost communally in the centre of a bush, all facing in the same direction and sitting side by side. Members of a group will preen each other. In an apparent territorial display, a pair of birds were found to sing while facing another singing pair and they all simultaneously bobbed their heads while perching on legs held straight to appear tall.

Shikras have been observed attempting to prey on these birds.

Known in parts of northern India as gulab chashm meaning "yellow spectacles", they were sometimes kept as cagebirds.

== Gallery ==
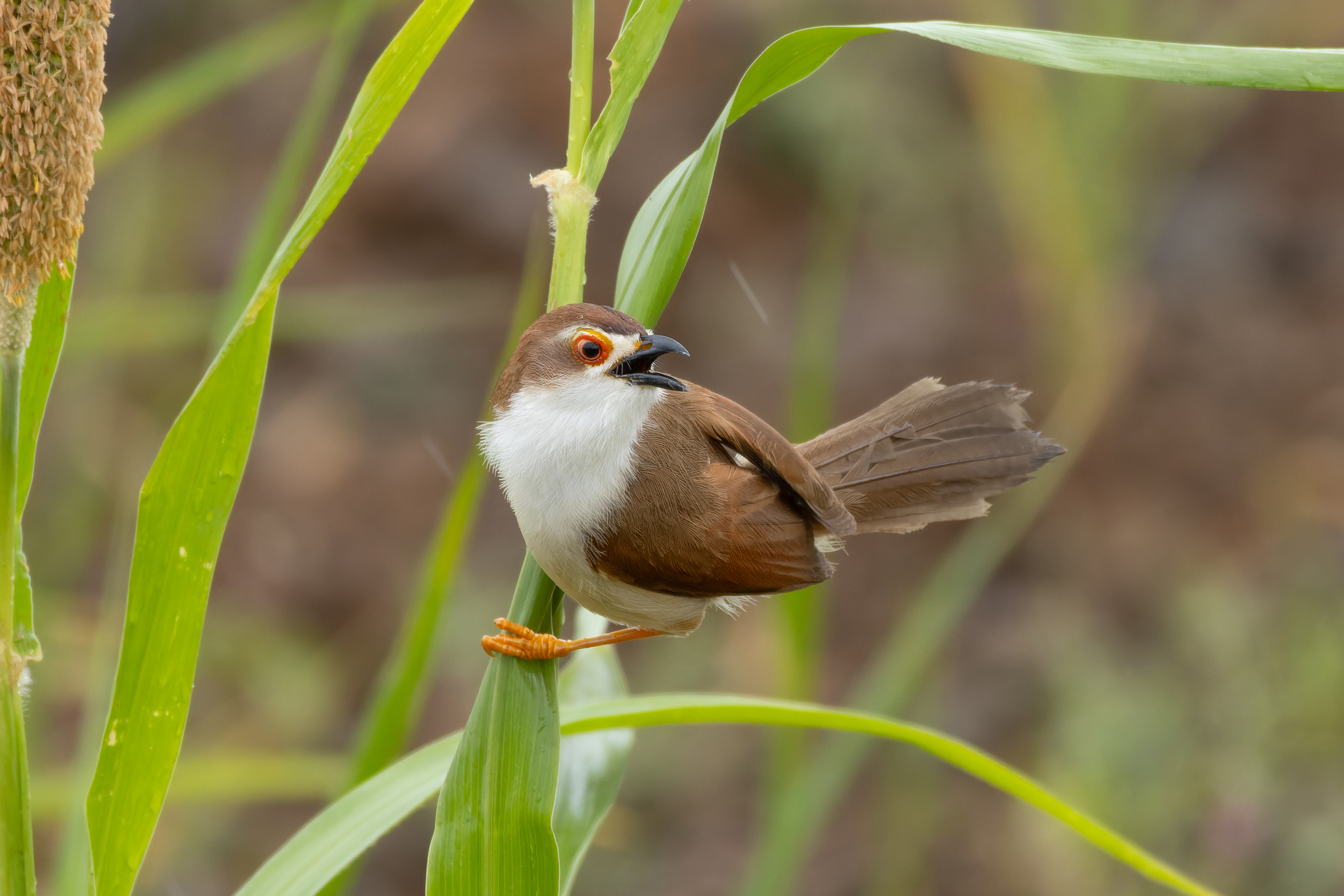

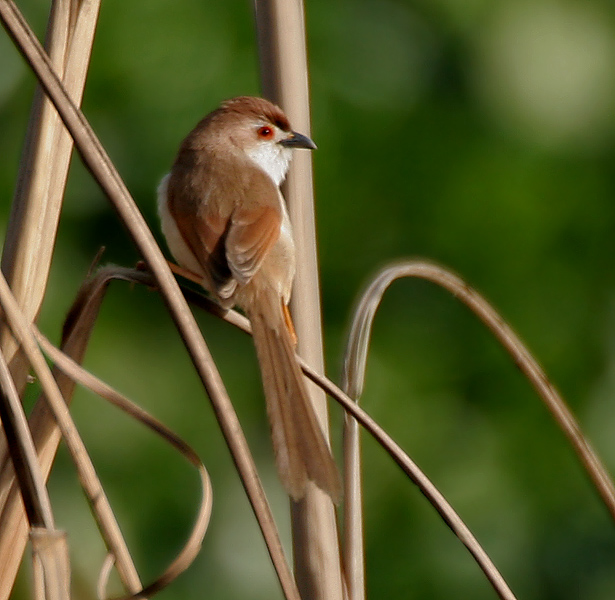
In typical habitat of grass, note the yellow nostril. (Hodal, Haryana)

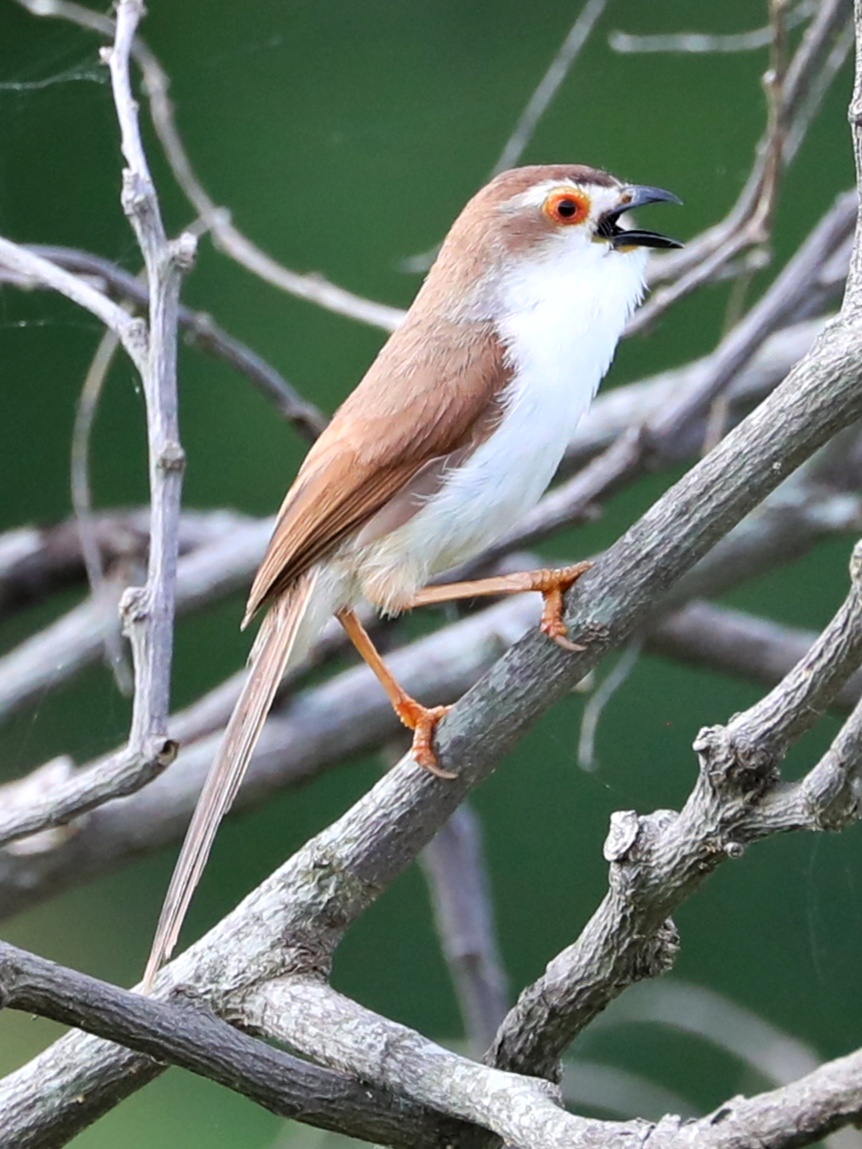
Yellow-eyed Babbler in Mysuru, India

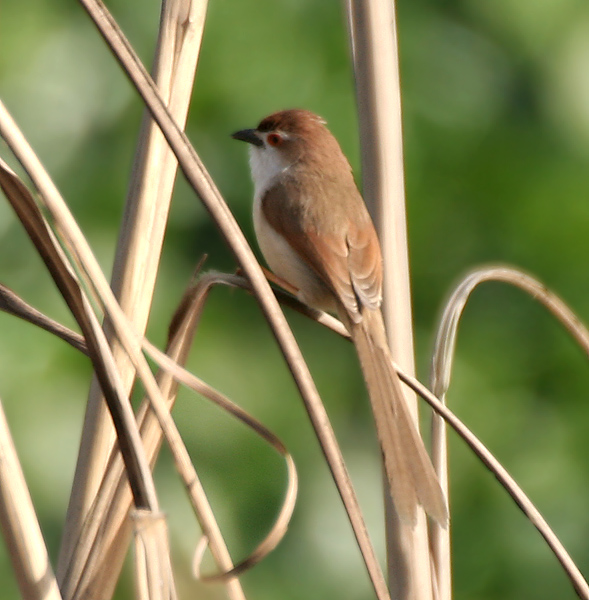
Perched on grass (Hodal, India)

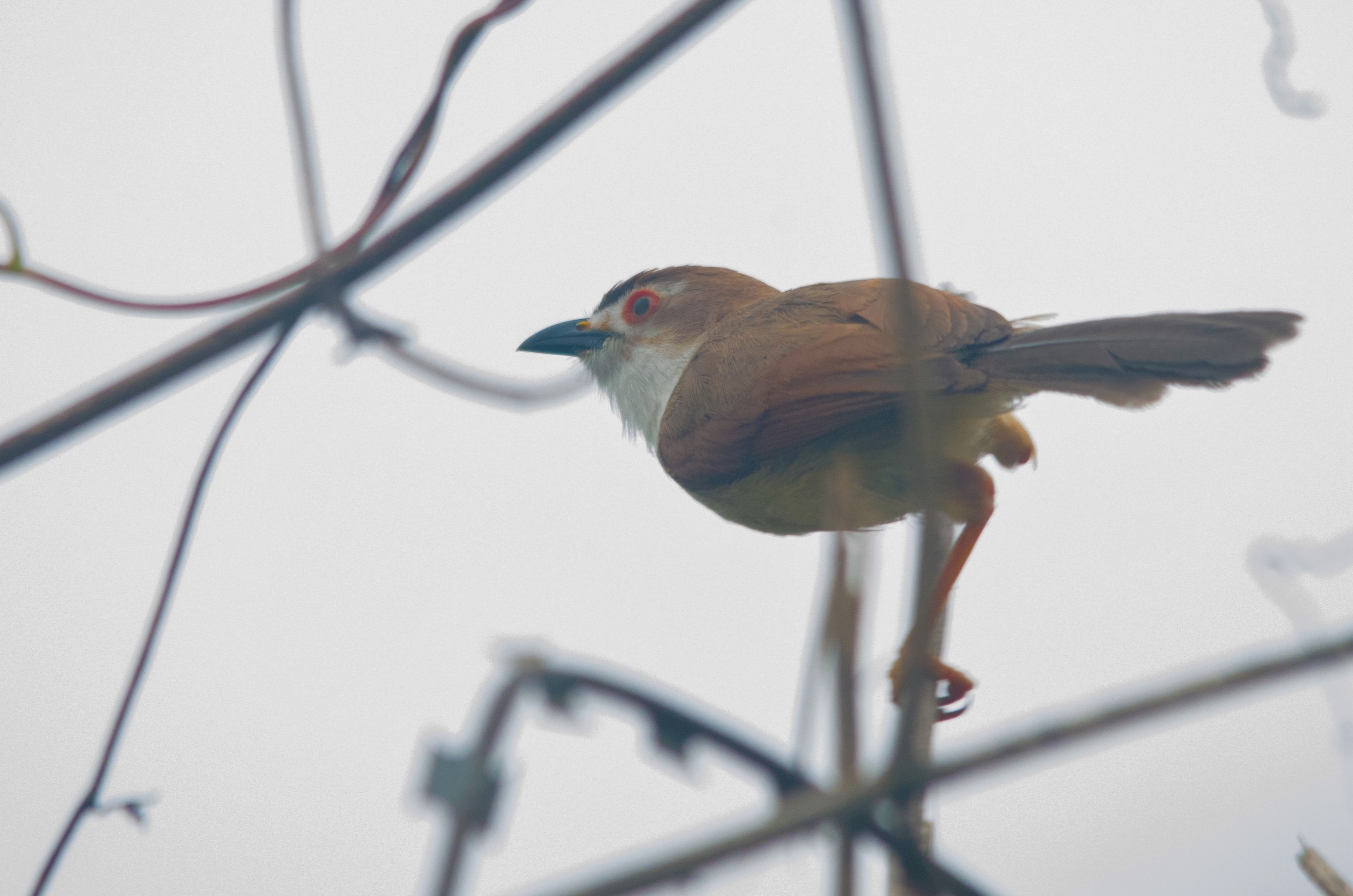
Yellow-eyed Babbler, Mumbai, India
