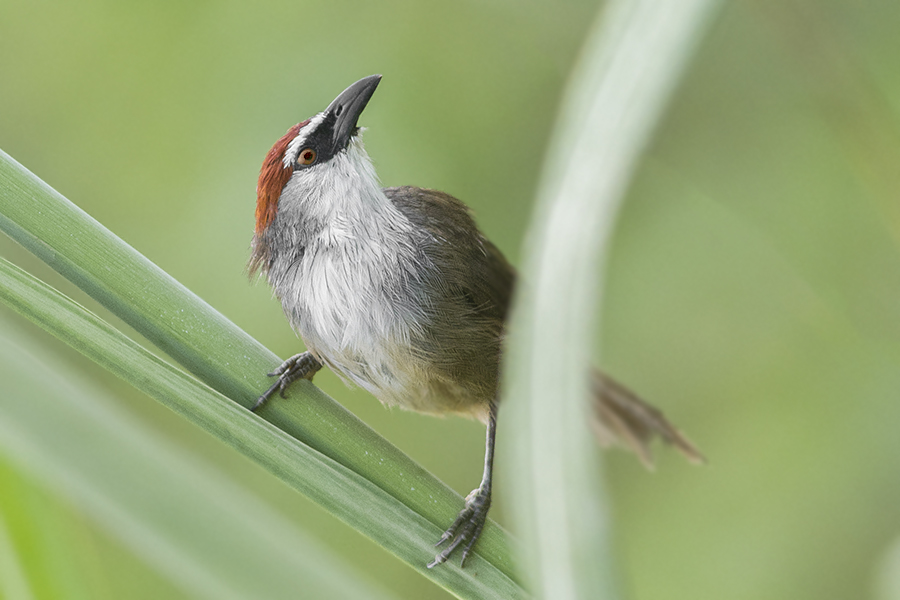
- T. p. bengalensis at Baur reservoir, Uttarakhand, India

Conservation status
- Least Concern (IUCN 3.1)

Scientific classification
- Kingdom: Animalia
- Phylum: Chordata
- Class: Aves
- Order: Passeriformes
- Family: Timaliidae
- Genus: Timalia; Horsfield, 1821
- Species: T. pileata

Binomial name
- Timalia pileata Horsfield, 1821

= Chestnut-capped babbler =

Species of bird

The chestnut-capped babbler (Timalia pileata) is a passerine bird of the family Timaliidae. It is monotypic within the genus Timalia.

== Taxonomy ==
The chestnut-capped babbler is placed as the sole species in the genus Timalia. It is divided into six subspecies with the following distribution:

- T. p. bengalensis – lower Himalayas (Uttarakhand in India, Nepal, Bangladesh, Bhutan, northeastern India, and northwestern Myanmar) south to Odisha in India
- T. p. smithi – northern Myanmar to southern China, northern Thailand and northern Indochina
- T. p. intermedia – central and southern Myanmar to southwestern Thailand
- T. p. patriciae – western part of the central plains of Thailand
- T. p. dictator – eastern and southeastern Thailand to southern Indochina
- T. p. pileata – Java, Bali

=== Related species ===
This species is most closely related to the two Indian species, the tawny-bellied babbler and the dark-fronted babbler. Together they form a sister group to the rest of the species in the family Timaliidae.

== Description ==
The chestnut-capped babbler is a medium-sized (15.5–17 cm) babbler with a fairly long, wedge-shaped tail and a thick, black bill. The plumage is unbarred brown with characteristic head markings, with a chestnut-coloured crown and black eye mask contrasting with a white forehead and white eyebrow line.

The sexes are similar in plumage, except that males are slightly larger and have a ruby-red iris, while females have a black iris.

== Ecology ==
=== Distribution ===
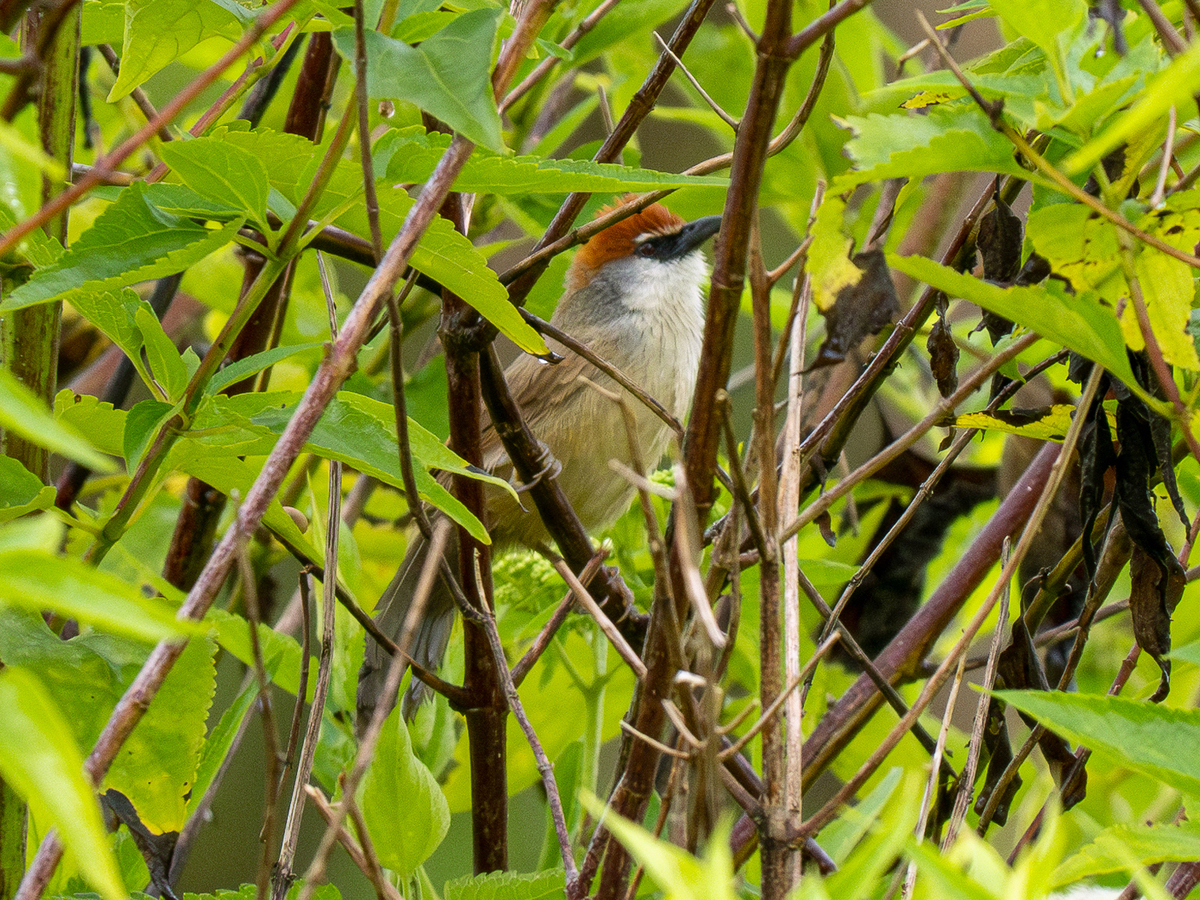
T. p. pileata in eastern Java

This bird is native in Bangladesh, Bhutan, Cambodia, southern China, northern India, Indonesia (Java, Bali), Laos, Myanmar, Nepal, Thailand, and Vietnam.

As of 2009, the Sukla Phanta Wildlife Reserve in Nepal represented the western limit of its distribution. More recently, it has now been found to occur further west in southern Uttarakhand, India. The nominate subspecies T. p. pileata on Java and Bali is disjunct, separated from the rest of the species distribution in mainland southeast Asia by about 1,800 km.

=== Behaviour ===
The species is found in tall grass, reed beds and shrublands. It feeds on butterfly larvae, beetles and other insects. The bird breeds between February and October in India and between April and September in Southeast Asia. It probably lays several clutches.

== Status ==
The species has a large range and population, but is thought to be declining in numbers due to habitat destruction and fragmentation, although not sufficiently so to be considered threatened. The International Union for Conservation of Nature (IUCN) therefore categorizes the species as "Least Concern". The global population has not been estimated, but it is described as locally common to uncommon. A significant threat to the species in West Bengal is the destruction of natural grasslands for floriculture.
