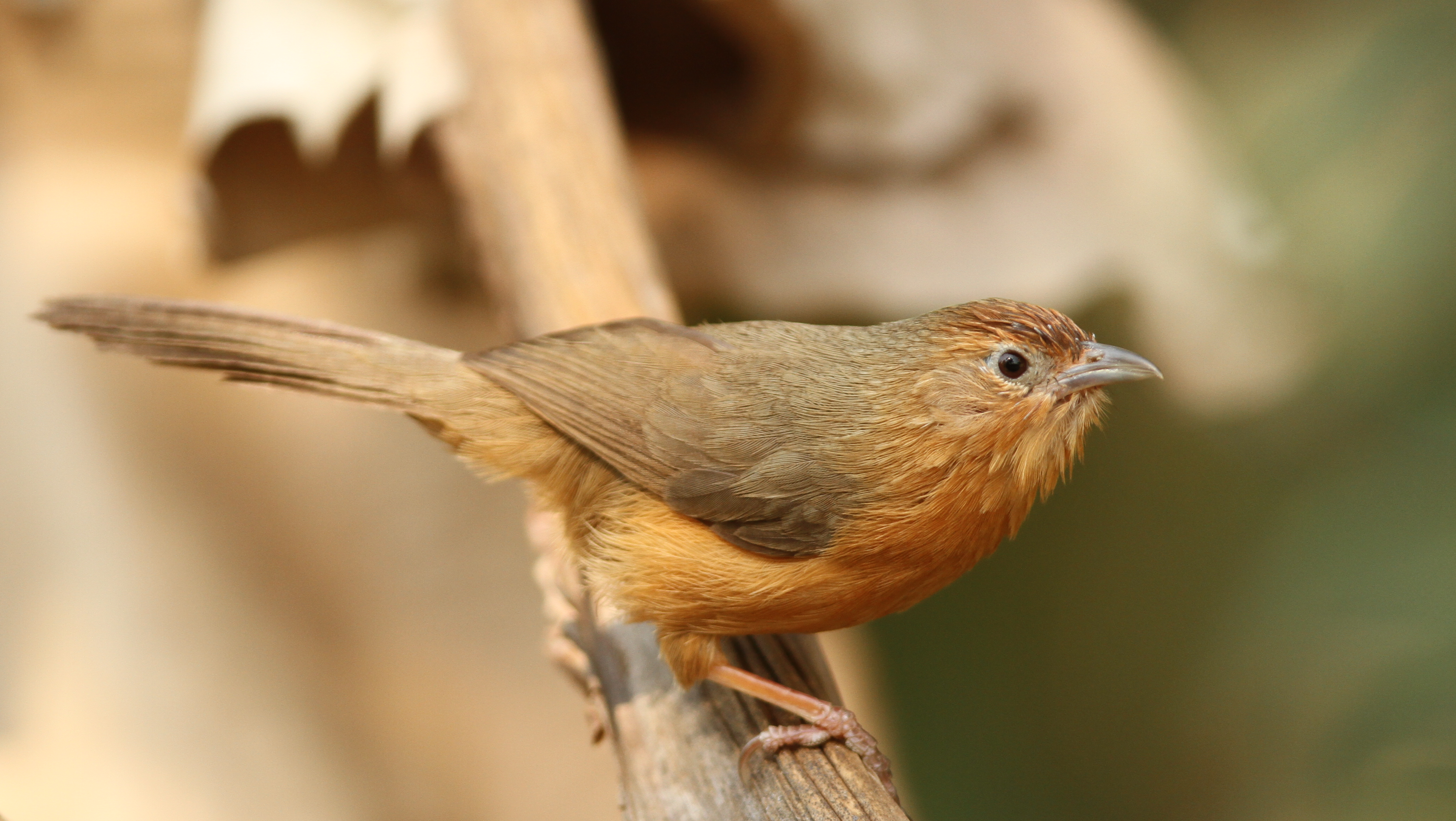
- Tawny-bellied babbler (Dumetia hyperythra)

Scientific classification
- Kingdom: Animalia
- Phylum: Chordata
- Class: Aves
- Order: Passeriformes
- Family: Timaliidae
- Genus: Dumetia; Blyth, 1852

Type species
- Timalia hyperythra (tawny-bellied babbler) Franklin, 1831

Species
- see text

= Dumetia =

Genus of birds

Dumetia is a genus of passerine birds in the Old World babbler family Timaliidae that are found in India and Sri Lanka.

== Taxonomy ==
The genus Dumetia was introduced in 1852 by the English zoologist Edward Blyth. The genus name is from Latin dumetum, dumeti, meaning "thicket." Blyth listed two species in the genus, and of these, George Robert Gray in 1855 selected the tawny-bellied babbler as the type species.

== Species ==
The genus contains the following two species:

Image	Common name	Scientific name	Distribution
	Tawny-bellied babbler	Dumetia hyperythra	north-central India to Sri Lanka
	Dark-fronted babbler	Dumetia atriceps	west India to Sri Lanka
