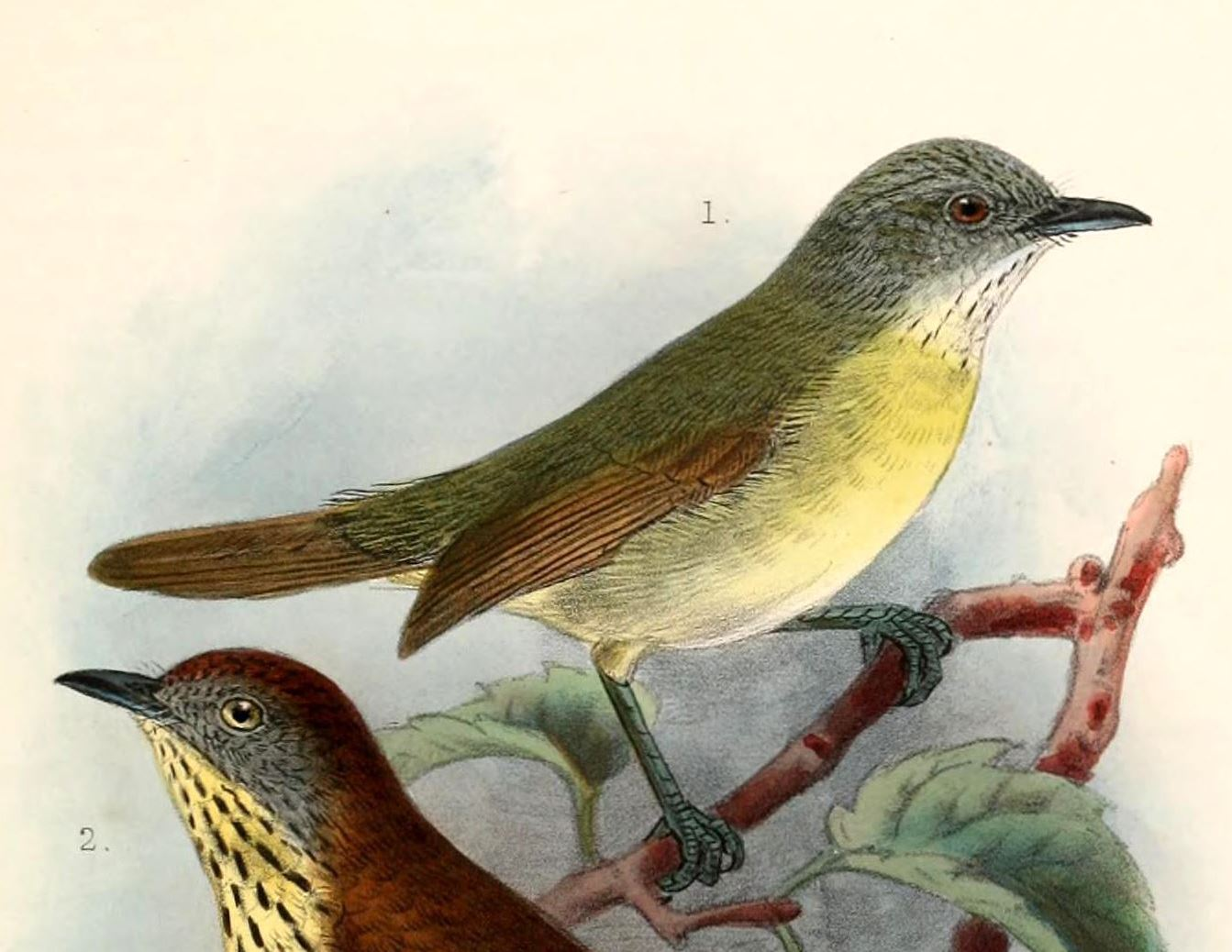

Conservation status
- Vulnerable (IUCN 3.1)

Scientific classification
- Kingdom: Animalia
- Phylum: Chordata
- Class: Aves
- Order: Passeriformes
- Family: Timaliidae
- Genus: Mixornis
- Species: M. prillwitzi

Binomial name
- Mixornis prillwitzi Hartert, 1901

= Kangean tit-babbler =

Species of bird

The Kangean tit-babbler (Mixornis prillwitzi) is a species of bird in the Old World babbler family Timaliidae that is endemic to the Kangean Islands in Indonesia.

Its natural habitat is subtropical or tropical moist lowland forest.
