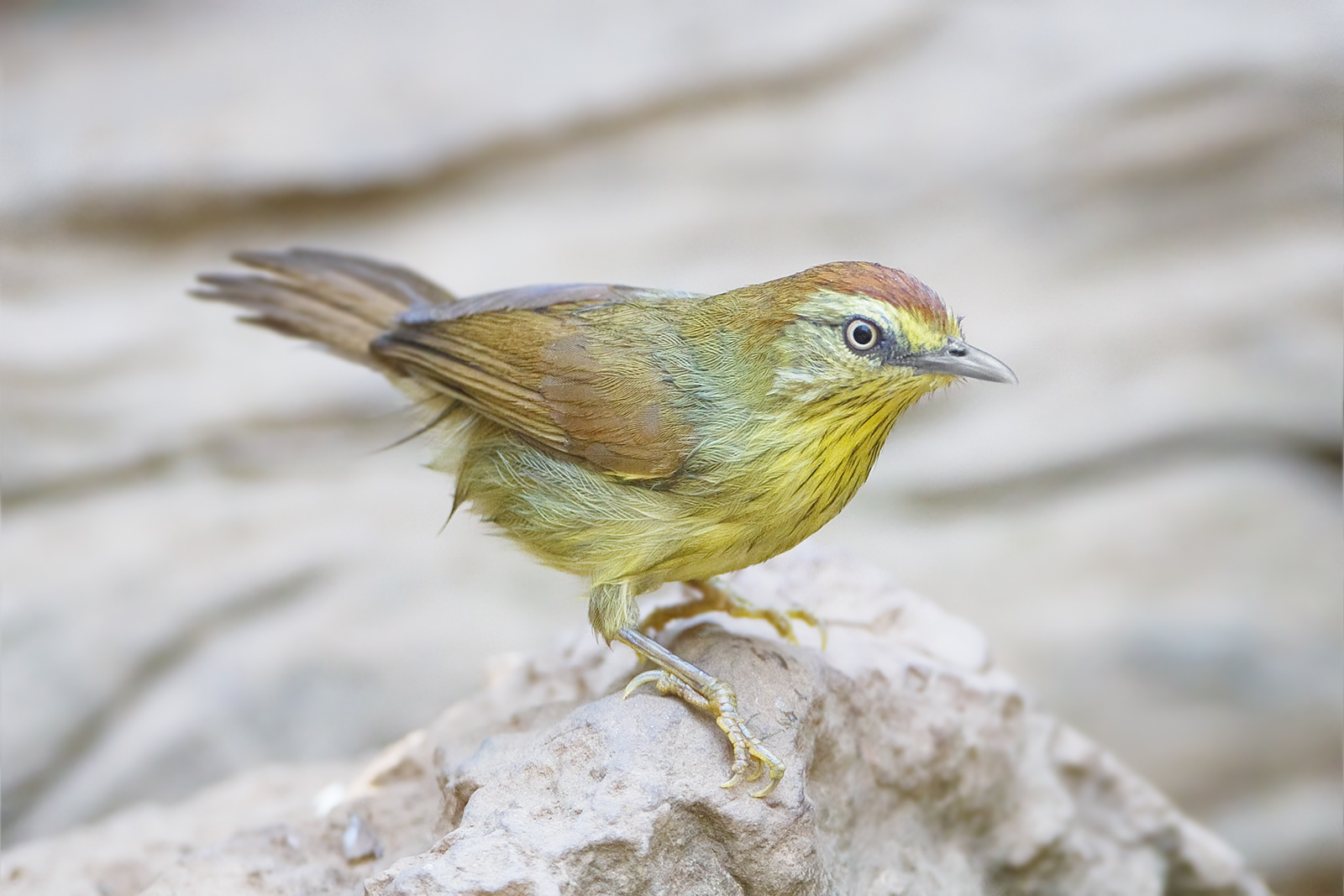
- Pin-striped tit-babbler, (Mixornis gularis)

Scientific classification
- Kingdom: Animalia
- Phylum: Chordata
- Class: Aves
- Order: Passeriformes
- Family: Timaliidae
- Genus: Mixornis; Blyth, 1842

Type species
- Timalia chloris = Motacilla rubicapilla Blyth, 1842

= Mixornis =

Genus of birds

Mixornis is a genus of passerine birds in the Old World babbler family Timaliidae.

== Taxonomy ==
These species were formerly placed in the genus Macronus. A molecular phylogenetic study published in 2012 found that Macronus was not monophyletic. To create monophyletic genera Macronus was split and some species moved to the resurrected genus Mixornis. Mixornis had been introduced in 1842 by the English zoologist Edward Blyth to accommodate the taxon Timalia chloris. This is a junior synonym of Macronous gularis rubicapillus which had been described in 1833 by Samuel Tickell. It is now one of the subspecies of the pin-striped tit-babbler (Mixornis gularis rubicapilla). The genus name combines the Ancient Greek mixis meaning "mixed" or "mingling" with ornis meaning "bird".

== Species ==
The genus includes the following six species:

Image	Common name	Scientific name	Distribution
	Pin-striped tit-babbler	Mixornis gularis	Bangladesh, Bhutan, Brunei, Cambodia, China, India, Indonesia, Laos, Malaysia, Myanmar, Nepal, Singapore, Thailand and Vietnam
	Palawan tit-babbler	Mixornis woodi	Palawan and Balabac in the Philippines
	Bold-striped tit-babbler	Mixornis bornensis	Borneo, and Java
	Grey-cheeked tit-babbler	Mixornis flavicollis	Java
	Kangean tit-babbler	Mixornis prillwitzi	the Kangean Islands
	Grey-faced tit-babbler	Mixornis kelleyi	Cambodia, Laos, and Vietnam
