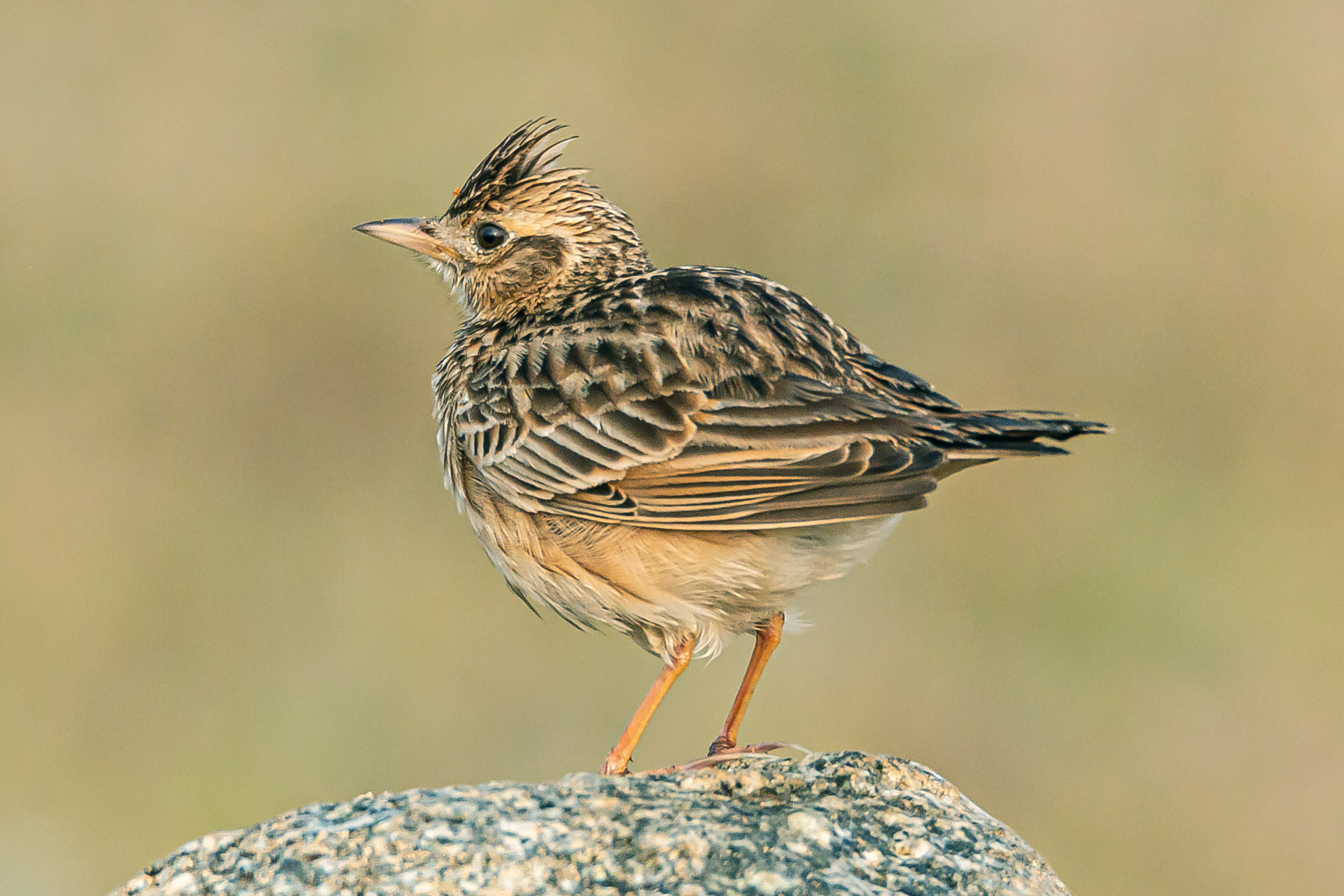
- A. g. gulgula near Hyderabad, India

Conservation status
- Least Concern (IUCN 3.1)

Scientific classification
- Kingdom: Animalia
- Phylum: Chordata
- Class: Aves
- Order: Passeriformes
- Family: Alaudidae
- Genus: Alauda
- Species: A. gulgula

Binomial name
- Alauda gulgula Franklin, 1831

Subspecies
- See text
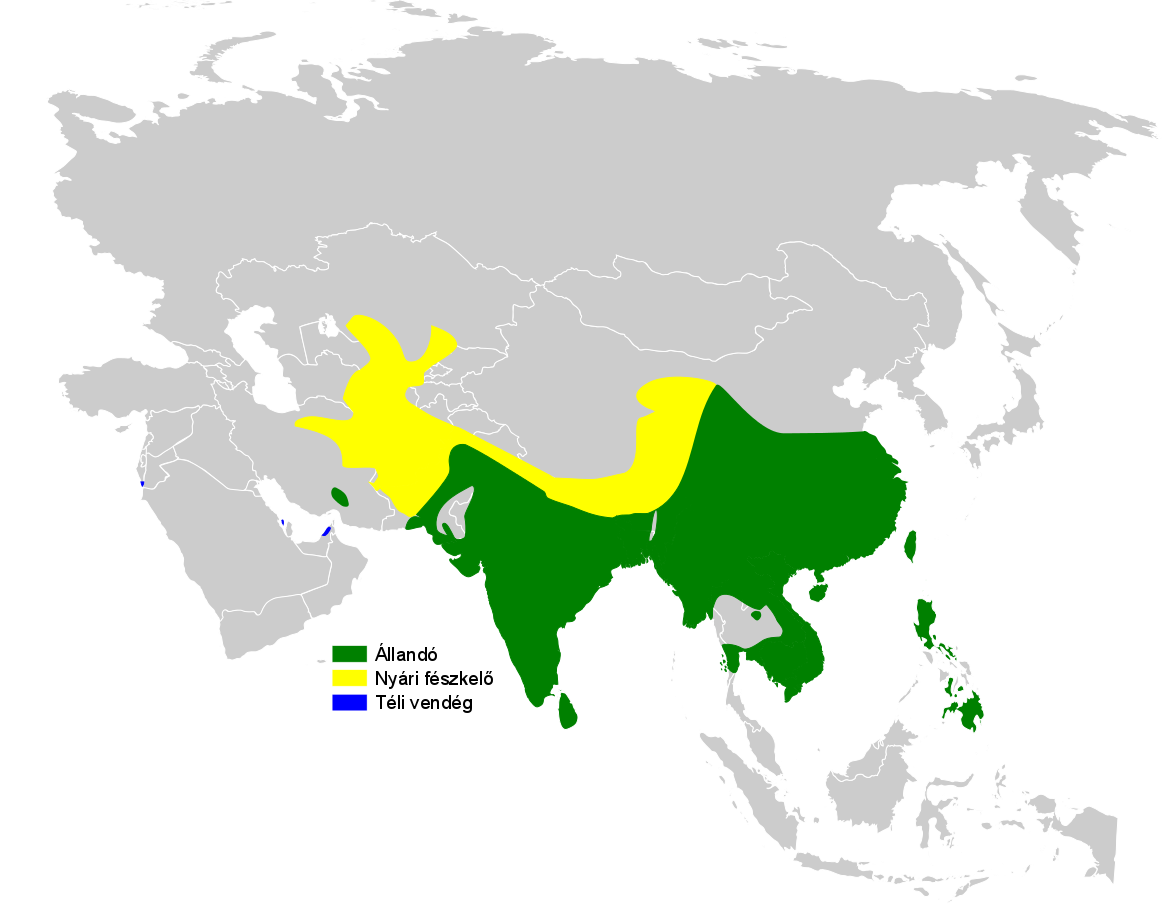

= Oriental skylark =

Species of bird

The Oriental skylark (Alauda gulgula) is a species of skylark found in the Sino-Indian region and parts of central Asia. Like other skylarks, it is found in open grassland where it feeds on seeds and insects.

== Taxonomy and systematics ==
The Oriental skylark was described by the English soldier and naturalist James Franklin in 1831 and given the binomial name Alauda gulgula. The meaning of the specific epithet gulgula is uncertain but is perhaps a reference to the song as gula is Latin for "throat", or maybe the colour of a gulgula, a sweet which looks like doughnut, made in many parts of Central India.

Other alternate names for the Oriental skylark include small skylark, eastern skylark, Indian skylark and lesser skylark.

=== Subspecies ===
Nine subspecies are accepted:

- A. g. inconspicua Severtsov, 1873: southern Kazakhstan to eastern Iran, Pakistan and north-western India; originally described as a separate species
- A. g. lhamarum Meinertzhagen, R & Meinertzhagen, A, 1926: Pamir Mountains and western Himalayas
- A. g. australis Brooks, WE, 1873: south-western India; originally described as a separate species
- A. g. inopinata Bianchi, 1905: Tibetan Plateau and north-western China
- A. g. vernayi Mayr, 1941: eastern Himalayas and south-western China
- A. g. gulgula Franklin, 1831 (syn. A. g. dharmakumarsinhjii, A. g. herberti): north-central India to Sri Lanka and east to Indochina
- A. g. weigoldi Hartert, 1922: central and eastern China
- A. g. coelivox R. Swinhoe, 1859 (syn. A. g. sala): southern and south-eastern China, Hainan, northern Vietnam; originally described as a separate species
- A. g. wattersi R. Swinhoe, 1871 (syn. A. g. wolfei): Taiwan, northern Philippines (Luzon); originally described as a separate species

Most populations are resident, but the northern and northwestern subspecies A. g. inconspicua, A. g. lhamarum, and A. g. inopinata, which breed at high altitudes in areas which get very cold in winter, migrate south and to lower altitudes in the winter. These migratory birds can be found as far west as Israel and northeastern Egypt in winter.

== Description ==
Oriental skylarks range from 15.5–18 cm (6.1–7.1 in) long and 24–30 g (0.85–1.06 oz) weight. They have streaked, yellow-brown upper plumage, with white outer tail feathers and a short crest. Both sexes are similar. The subspecies vary subtly in size, bill length, and plumage tone, with A. g. inopinata being the largest and palest. A. g. coelivox has a longer bill, and A. g. wattersi is more heavily streaked above.

The Oriental skylark differs from the Eurasian skylark in being smaller, with a longer, more pointed bill, and a shorter tail and wings. The outer tail feathers are more buff, and it lacks the white trailing edge to the wings during flight.

== Distribution and habitat ==
This lark breeds across the Sino-Indian region and parts of central Asia. It winters in the southern parts of its range.

It occurs from sea level up to 4,300 m altitude, and is usually found in open areas with short vegetation, such as grasslands, marshes, the edges of lakes, etc. It feeds on seeds and insects. It avoids forested areas, though it may be found in large forest clearings.

== Behaviour and ecology ==
These skylarks frequently rocket up into the sky, fluttering and singing before descending down to earth. Male Oriental skylarks may also hover in the air and sing, in order to attract a mate.
