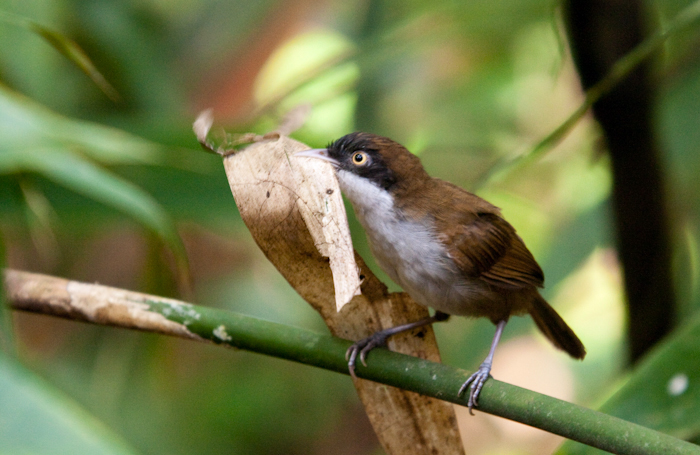
- Dumetia atriceps nigrifrons at Kanneliya Forest Reserve, Sri Lanka

Conservation status
- Least Concern (IUCN 3.1)

Scientific classification
- Kingdom: Animalia
- Phylum: Chordata
- Class: Aves
- Order: Passeriformes
- Family: Timaliidae
- Genus: Dumetia
- Species: D. atriceps

Binomial name
- Dumetia atriceps (Jerdon, 1839)

Synonyms
- Alcippe atriceps; Rhopocichla atriceps

= Dark-fronted babbler =

Species of bird

The dark-fronted babbler (Dumetia atriceps) is an Old World babbler found in the Western Ghats of India and the forests of Sri Lanka. They are small chestnut brown birds with a dark black cap, a whitish underside and pale yellow iris. They forage in flocks in the undergrowth of forests constantly making calls and uttering alarm calls when disturbed.

== Taxonomy ==
The dark-fronted babbler was formally described in 1839 by the English naturalist Thomas Jerdon under the binomial name Brachypteryx atriceps. He specified the range as Thrissur, Wadakkancherry, Coonoor and the Wayanad of southwest India. The type locality was restricted to Wayanad by Hugh Whistler in 1935. The dark-fronted babbler was formerly placed in the monotypic genus Rhopocichla. It was moved to Dumetia with the tawny-bellied babbler based on the results of a large molecular phylogenetic study published in 2019. The genus Dumetia was introduced in 1852 by the English zoologist Edward Blyth. The genus name is from Latin dumetum, dumeti meaning "thicket". The specific epithet atriceps combines the Latin ater meaning "black" with -ceps meaning "-capped" or "-headed".

Four subspecies are recognised:

- D. a. atriceps (Jerdon, 1839) – west to south India
- D. a. bourdilloni (Hume, 1876) – southwest to south India
- D. a. siccata (Whistler, 1941) – north, east Sri Lanka
- D. a. nigrifrons (Blyth, 1849) – southwest Sri Lanka

== Description ==
The dark-fronted babbler measures 13 cm including its square-tipped tail. It is brown above and white below. The two subspecies in the Western Ghats have black hoods, but the two Sri Lankan races have this reduced to a dark bandit mask. The pale yellow iris stands in contrast. The subspecies in the southern Western Ghats bourdilloni has a duller sooty-black hood, browner underside and the upper parts are more olive. The nominate form found north of the Palghat Gap has the hood dark black. In Sri Lanka, the subspecies siccata is found in the lower elevation while nigrifrons is found in the wet zone. The former has more olive on the upperparts while the later is rufescent on the upperparts.

== Behaviour and ecology ==
Babblers have a weak flight and are residents within their range. They forage in parties and clamber up vegetation and when disturbed, they tend to drop from the topmost perches of the bush into the undergrowth. Their typical habitat is undergrowth in forest or on the edge of forests in more open growth. Their food is mainly insects. They can be difficult to observe in the dense vegetation they prefer, but like other babblers, these are noisy birds, and their characteristic rattling churr alarm calls are often the best indication that these birds are present. They often join mixed-species foraging flocks.

The breeding season is May to July. This babbler builds its nest low down in a bush, the nest being a ball of leaves, often of bamboo. The nest looks like some dry leaves stuck in a bush with the opening on the side. The normal clutch is two eggs. They are also said to construct dormitory nests within which birds may sometimes roost. These dormitory nests are not lined.

== Gallery ==
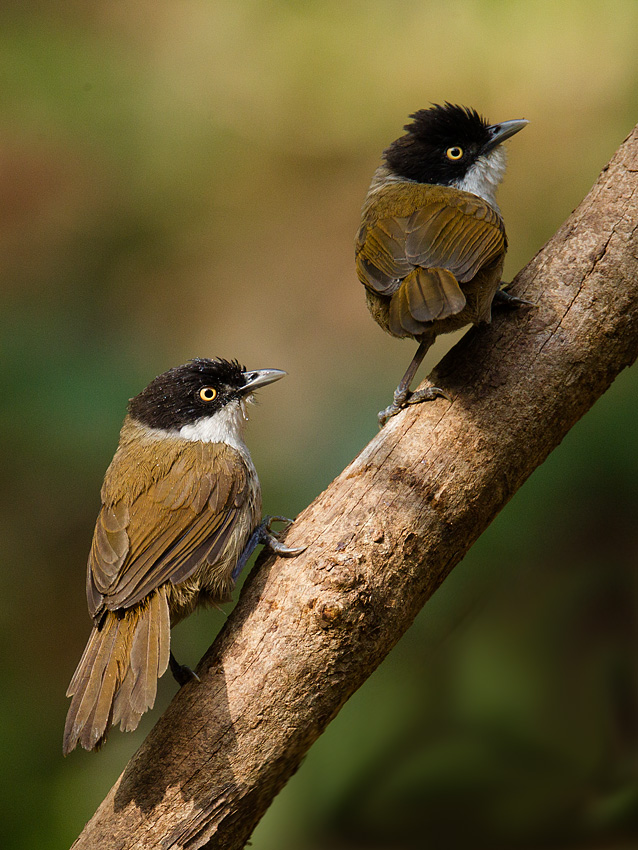
D.a.atriceps at Dandeli, India

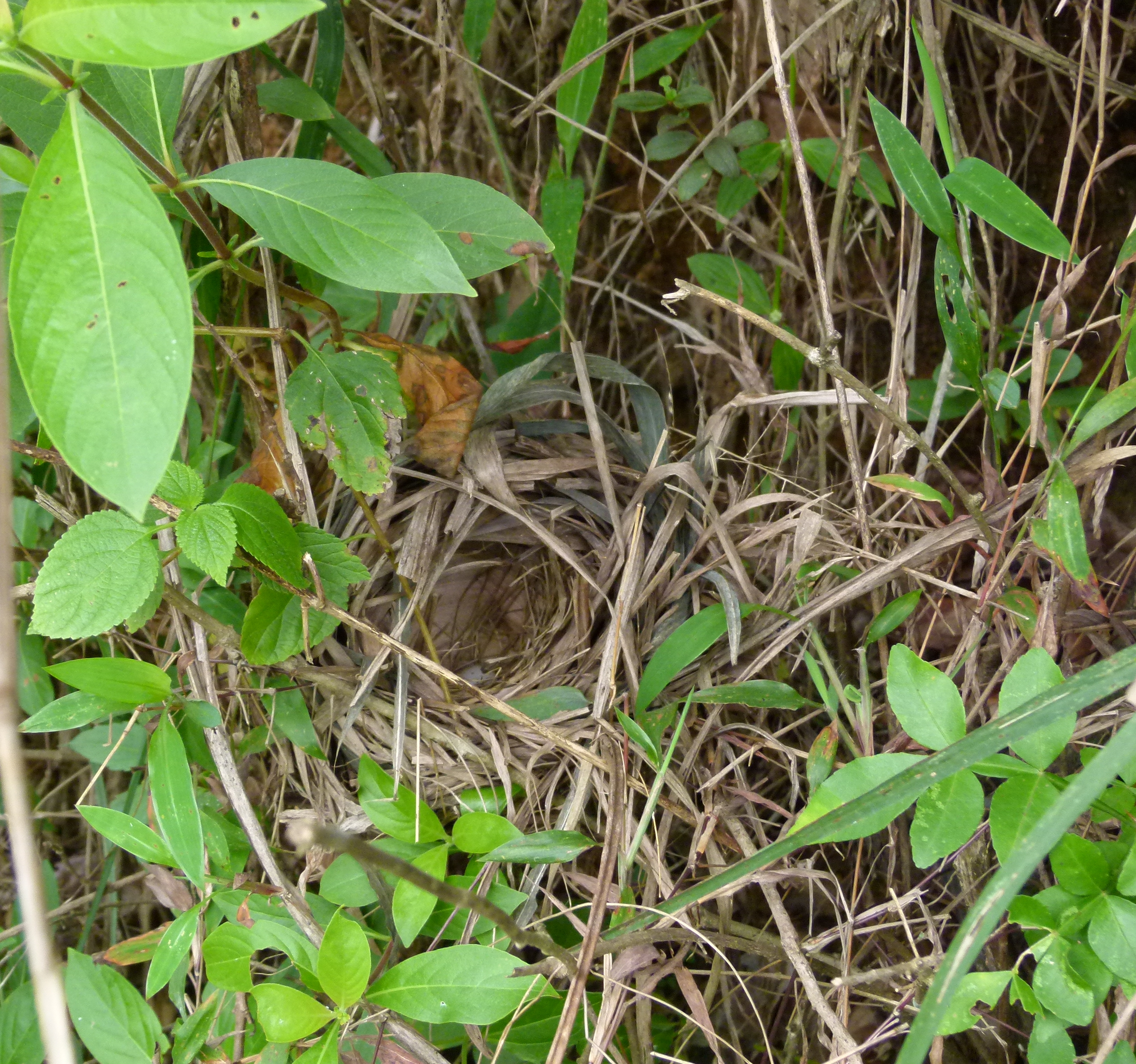
View of nest
