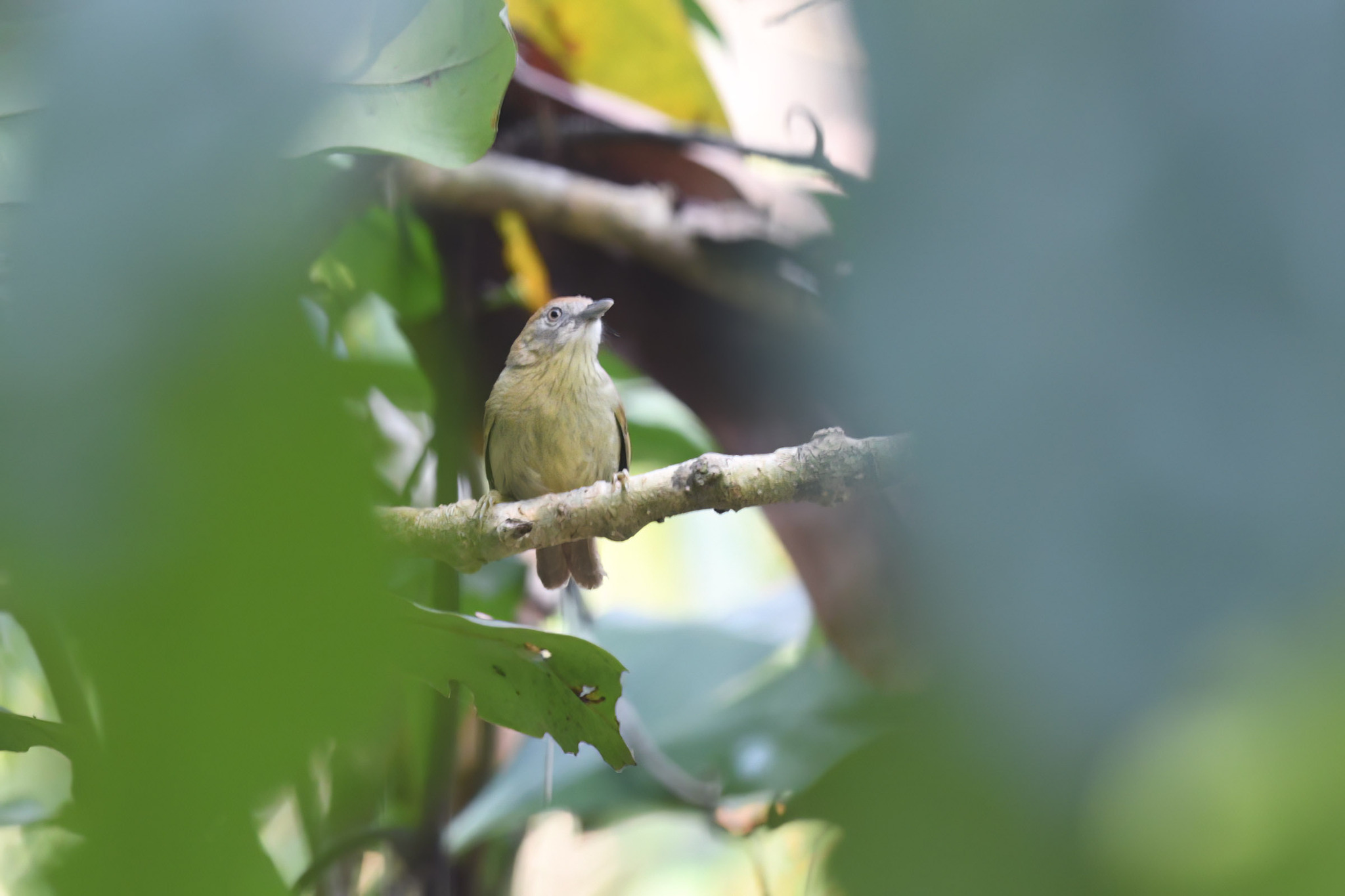

Conservation status
- Least Concern (IUCN 3.1)

Scientific classification
- Kingdom: Animalia
- Phylum: Chordata
- Class: Aves
- Order: Passeriformes
- Family: Timaliidae
- Genus: Mixornis
- Species: M. kelleyi

Binomial name
- Mixornis kelleyi Delacour, 1932

= Grey-faced tit-babbler =

Species of bird

The grey-faced tit-babbler (Mixornis kelleyi) is a species of bird in the family Timaliidae. It is found in Cambodia, Laos, and Vietnam, where its natural habitat is subtropical or tropical moist lowland forest.

== See also ==
- Kelley-Roosevelts Asiatic Expedition
