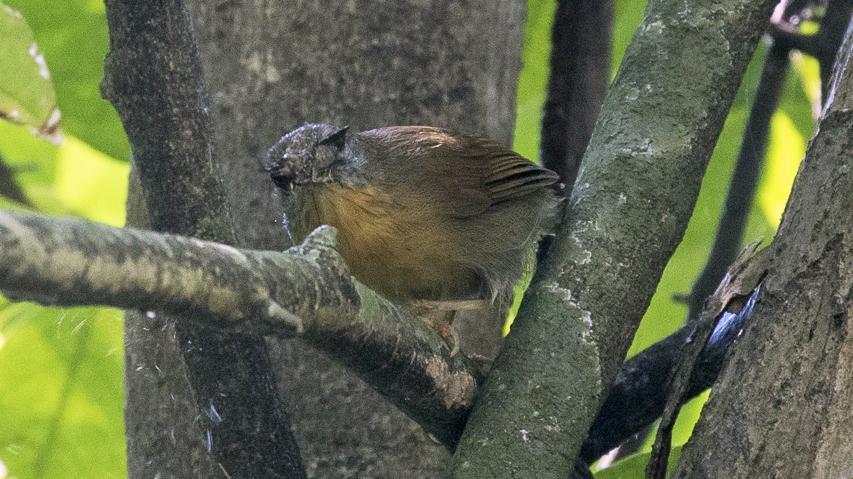

Conservation status
- Least Concern (IUCN 3.1)

Scientific classification
- Kingdom: Animalia
- Phylum: Chordata
- Class: Aves
- Order: Passeriformes
- Family: Timaliidae
- Genus: Mixornis
- Species: M. flavicollis

Binomial name
- Mixornis flavicollis Bonaparte, 1850

= Grey-cheeked tit-babbler =

Species of bird

The grey-cheeked tit-babbler (Mixornis flavicollis) is a species of bird in the family Timaliidae. It is endemic to Java.

Its natural habitat is subtropical or tropical moist lowland forest.
