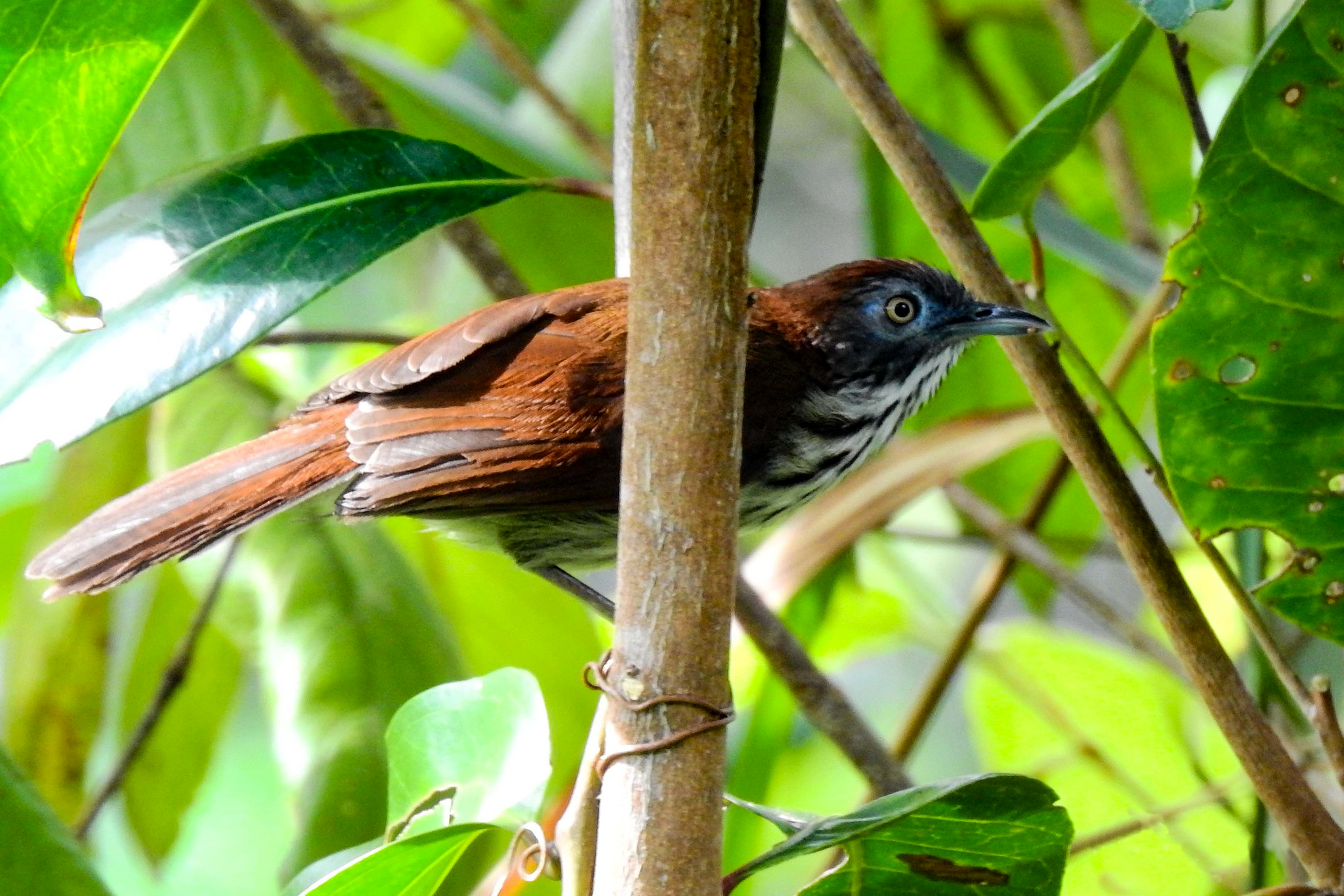
- At South Kalimantan, Borneo

Conservation status
- Least Concern (IUCN 3.1)

Scientific classification
- Kingdom: Animalia
- Phylum: Chordata
- Class: Aves
- Order: Passeriformes
- Family: Timaliidae
- Genus: Mixornis
- Species: M. bornensis

Binomial name
- Mixornis bornensis Bonaparte, 1850

= Bold-striped tit-babbler =

Species of bird

The bold-striped tit-babbler (Mixornis bornensis) is a species of Old World babbler found in Southeast Asia.

== Description ==
The bold-striped tit-babbler has a distinctive yellowish supercilium and rufous crown. The throat is yellowish with brown streaks.

Call is a loud repeated chonk-chonk-chonk-chonk-chonk somewhat reminiscent of a common tailorbird.

== Distribution ==
The bold-striped tit-babbler is found in Borneo and Java.

== Behaviour ==
Bold-striped tit-babblers forage in small flocks and creep and clamber in low vegetation. They breed in the pre-monsoon season from February to July and build a loose ball-shaped nest made from grasses and leaves.
