= James Franklin (naturalist) =

British soldier and naturalist

James Franklin (c. 1783 – 31 August 1834) was a British soldier. He was the brother of Sir John Franklin.

James Franklin entered the service of the British East India Company as a cadet in 1805. He served with distinction on various Indian surveys and was elected a member of the Royal Society. He was in the 1st Bengal Cavalry and was an authority on geology. He undertook surveys of the Central Provinces (Vindhya Hills) and collected birds for the Asiatic Society. He collected about 40 species before reaching Benares, and on reaching Saugor he had collected 160 more specimens and made paintings of these. In 1831 Franklin published descriptions of the birds that he had collected. He is now recognised as the taxonomic authority for six species:

- White-eyed buzzard
- Indian eagle-owl
- Rufous-tailed lark
- Oriental skylark
- Tawny-bellied babbler
- Indian spotted creeper

The specimens went to the Zoological Society of London but his paintings were stipulated to be returned to the Asiatic Society in Calcutta.
