= Erythronium 'Pagoda' =

Flowering plant cultivar

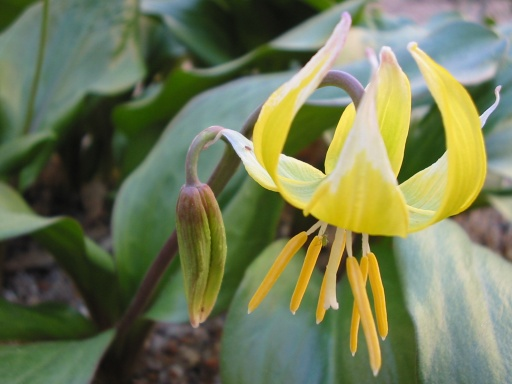
- Hybrid parentage: Erythronium tuolumnense × Erythronium 'White Beauty'
- Cultivar: 'Pagoda'

Erythronium 'Pagoda' is a cultivar of the genus Erythronium in the family Liliaceae. Its origin may be as a hybrid between Erythronium tuolumnense and Erythronium 'White Beauty' (thought to be a cultivar of E. californicum). It flowers in early spring.

This plant prefers partial shade and a light soil, rich in humus. Tubers must not get too hot or too dry in summer.

Propagation is either by seed in autumn or by division of bulbs when the leaves die down in summer.

This plant has been awarded the Royal Horticultural Society's Award of Garden Merit.
