= Avalanche lily =

Avalanche lily is a common name for several plants in the genus Erythronium and may refer to:

- Erythronium grandiflorum, with yellow flowers
- Erythronium montanum, with white flowers
