= Erythronium krylovii =

Scientific classification
- Kingdom: Plantae
- Clade: Tracheophytes
- Clade: Angiosperms
- Clade: Monocots
- Order: Liliales
- Family: Liliaceae
- Subfamily: Lilioideae
- Tribe: Lilieae
- Genus: Erythronium
- Species: E. krylovii

Binomial name
- Erythronium krylovii Applegate

Species of flowering plant

Erythronium krylovii is a plant species known only from the Tuva and Krasnoyarsk regions in Siberia.
