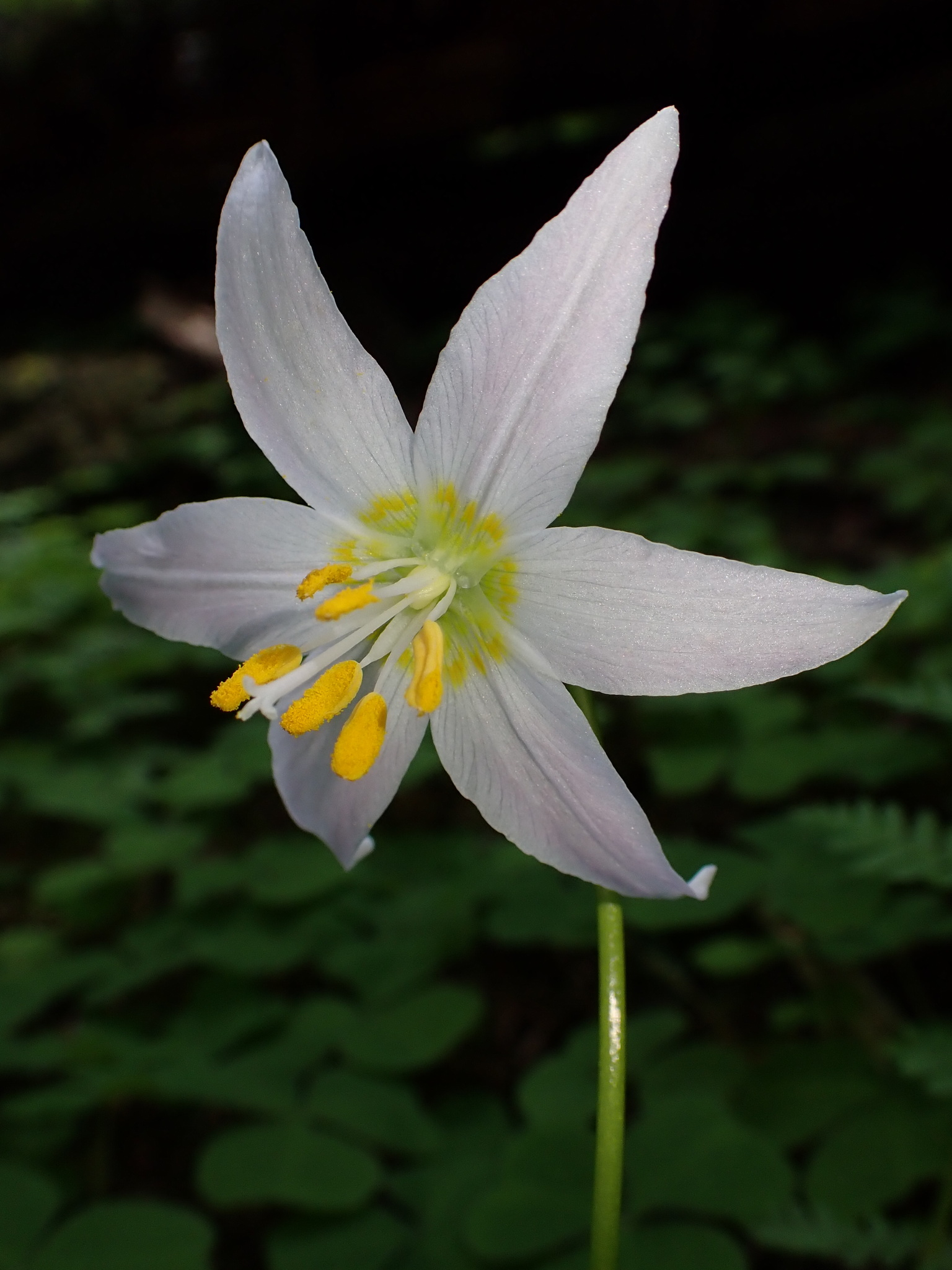

Conservation status
- Critically Imperiled (NatureServe)

Scientific classification
- Kingdom: Plantae
- Clade: Tracheophytes
- Clade: Angiosperms
- Clade: Monocots
- Order: Liliales
- Family: Liliaceae
- Subfamily: Lilioideae
- Tribe: Lilieae
- Genus: Erythronium
- Species: E. quinaultense

Binomial name
- Erythronium quinaultense G.A.Allen

= Erythronium quinaultense =

Quinault fawn lily

Species of flowering plant

Erythronium quinaultense, the Quinault fawn-lily, is a rare plant species endemic to a small region around Lake Quinault in Olympic National Park, Washington state, United States.

Erythronium quinaultense produces egg-shaped bulbs up to 75 millimetres (3.0 in) long. Leaves are up to 20 centimetres (7.9 in) long. Scape is up to 25 centimetres (9.8 in) long, bearing one to three flowers. Tepals have yellow, white and pink bands perpendicular to the veins.
