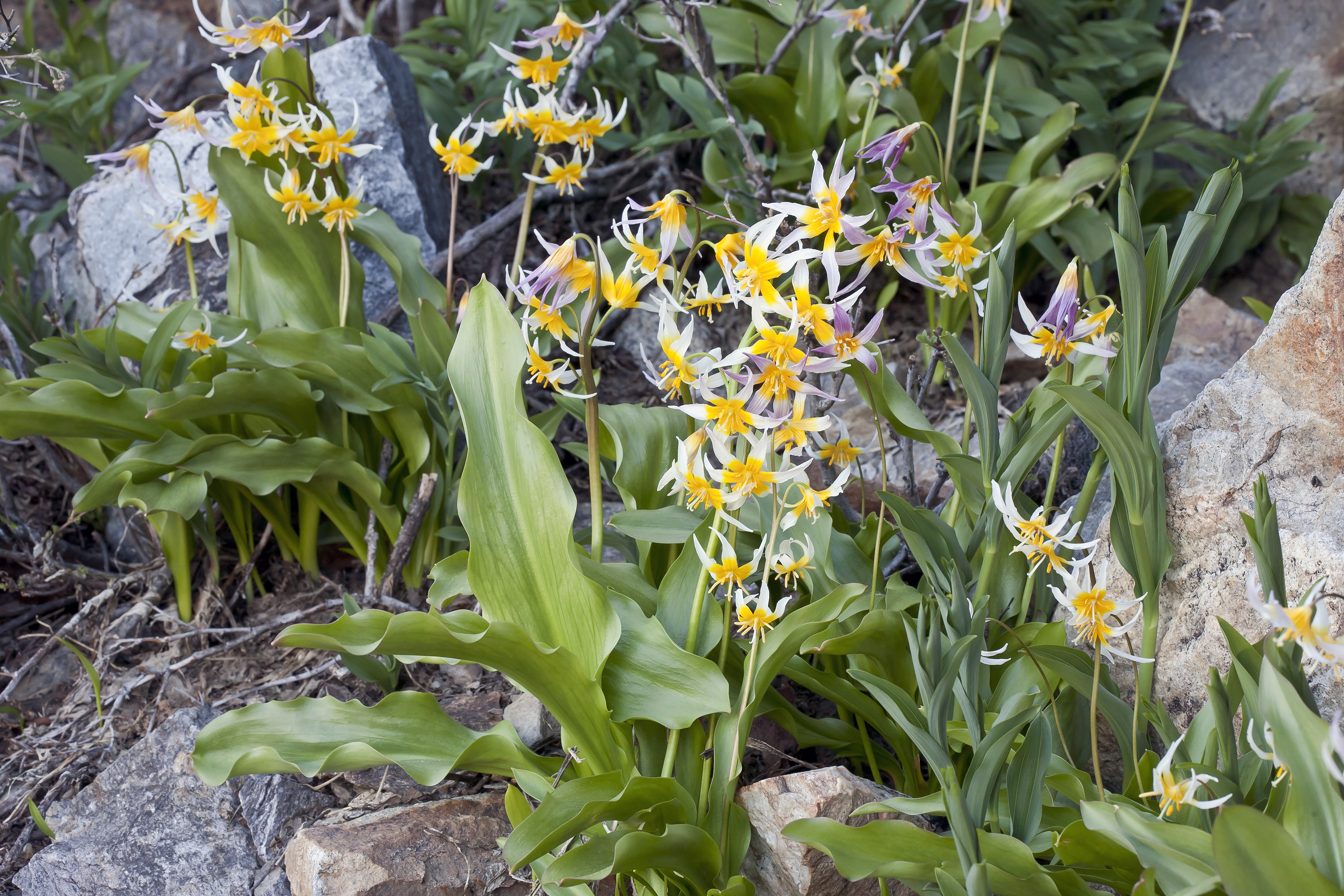

Scientific classification
- Kingdom: Plantae
- Clade: Tracheophytes
- Clade: Angiosperms
- Clade: Monocots
- Order: Liliales
- Family: Liliaceae
- Subfamily: Lilioideae
- Tribe: Lilieae
- Genus: Erythronium
- Species: E. pusaterii

Binomial name
- Erythronium pusaterii (Munz & J.T. Howell) Shevock, Bartel & G.A.Allen

Synonyms
- Erythronium grandiflorum subsp. pusaterii Munz & J.T.Howell

= Erythronium pusaterii =

Species of flowering plant

Erythronium pusaterii is a species of flowering plant in the lily family known by the common names Kaweah Lakes fawn lily and Hocket Lakes fawn lily.

It is endemic to Tulare County, California, where it is known from only about ten sites in the Sierra Nevada.

The epithet pusaterii was chosen in honor of Samuel J. Pusateri, of the College of the Sequoias, collector of the original type material.

== Description ==
This perennial wildflower grows from a bulb 4 to 6 centimeters wide and bears usually two wavy-edged, lance-shaped leaves each up to 35 centimeters long. The inflorescence arises on a stalk up to 40 centimeters tall and bears one to eight flowers. The flower has six tepals up to 4.5 centimeters long which are white at the tips and yellow drying pink at the bases.
