= Klamath =

Klamath may refer to:

== Ethnic groups ==
- Klamath people, a Native American people of California and Oregon
  - Klamath Tribes, a federally recognized group of tribes in Oregon
- Klamath language, spoken by the Klamath people

== Places in the United States ==
- False Klamath, California, a coastal area along U.S. Route 101
- Fort Klamath, a former military outpost in Oregon
- Fort Klamath, Oregon, a present-day unincorporated community near the former fort
- Klamath, California, a census-designated place
- Klamath, California, former name of Johnsons, California
- Klamath Basin, the region in Oregon and California drained by the Klamath River
- Klamath County, California
- Klamath County, Oregon
- Klamath Mountains, in California and Oregon
- Klamath National Forest
- Klamath River, in Oregon and California

== Science and technology ==
- Klamath (microprocessor), a variant of the Pentium II microprocessor
- Klamath, a ferryboat that operated on San Francisco Bay
- Klamath (steamboat), a steamboat that operated on Lower Klamath Lake in the early 20th century
- USS Klamath, a U.S. Navy steamer
- Klamath (train), a Southern Pacific passenger train

== Other uses ==
- Klamath Hardwoods, now Columbia Forest Products, an American hardwood manufacturer
- Klamath (album), a 2009 album by American musician Mark Eitzel

== See also ==
- Klamath 5, or "555", a common prefix for fictitious telephone numbers
- Klamath coneflower, a species of genus Rudbeckia
- Klamath fawn lily, a species of genus Erythronium
- Klamath Lake sculpin, a fish species of genus Cottus
- Klamath trillium, or Pseudotrillium rivale, a flower species
- Klamath weed, or St. John's wort, a flowering plant of family Hypericaceae
