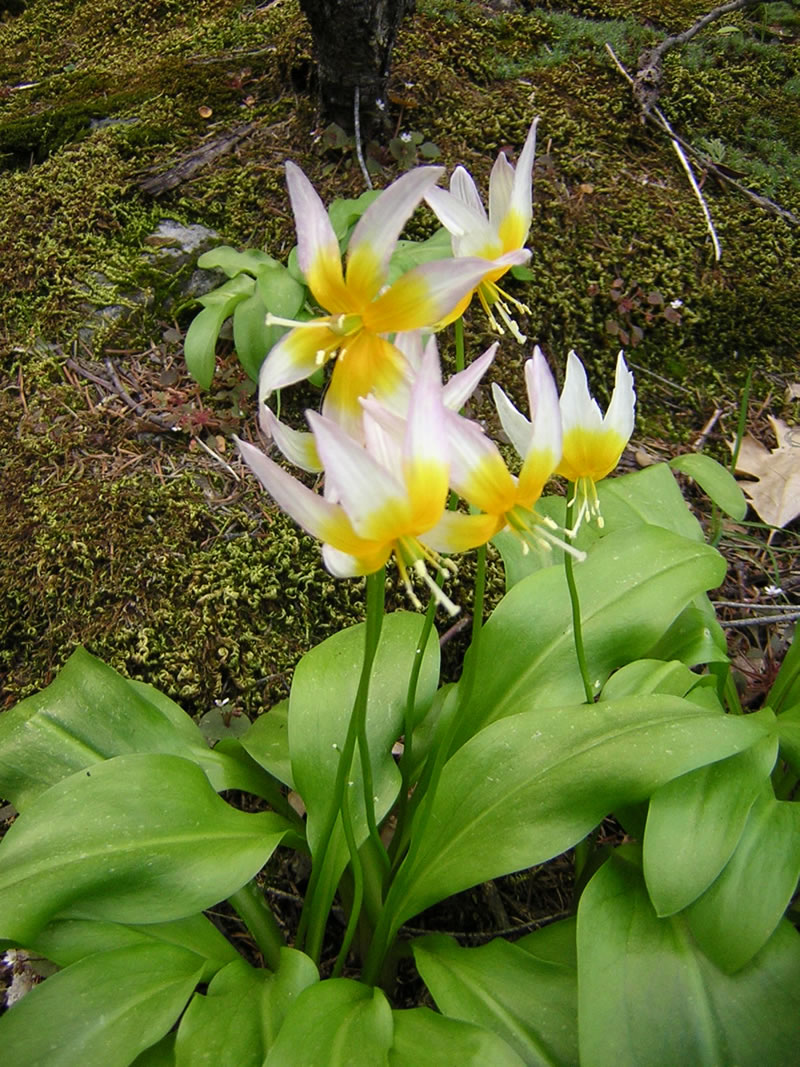

Conservation status
- Critically Imperiled (NatureServe)

Scientific classification
- Kingdom: Plantae
- Clade: Embryophytes
- Clade: Tracheophytes
- Clade: Spermatophytes
- Clade: Angiosperms
- Clade: Monocots
- Order: Liliales
- Family: Liliaceae
- Subfamily: Lilioideae
- Genus: Erythronium
- Species: E. taylorii

Binomial name
- Erythronium taylorii Shevock & G.A.Allen

= Erythronium taylorii =

Species of flowering plant

Erythronium taylorii is a rare species of flowering plant in the lily family known by the common names Pilot Ridge fawn lily, Taylor's fawnlily, and Yosemite fawn lily. It is endemic to Tuolumne County, California, where it is known only from Pilot Ridge, a remote mountain ridge outside of Yosemite National Park. It was discovered in 1996 and described to science as E. taylori in 1997, and it is now called E. taylorii. There are at least 1000 individuals in the single known population. It occurs on shaded north-facing cliffs.

This lily grows from a bulb several centimeters wide and produces wavy-edged basal leaves up to 35 centimeters long. The green flowering stem is up to 40 centimeters tall and bears 1 to 8 showy, pendent lily flowers. Each flower has six lance-shaped tepals which may be over 4 centimeters long. They are white with bright yellow bases and fade pink with age. The six long yellow stamens are tipped with large white anthers.
