= Dichomeris stipendiaria =

Scientific classification
- Domain: Eukaryota
- Kingdom: Animalia
- Phylum: Arthropoda
- Class: Insecta
- Order: Lepidoptera
- Family: Gelechiidae
- Genus: Dichomeris
- Species: D. stipendiaria

Binomial name
- Dichomeris stipendiaria (Braun, 1925)

Synonyms
- Trichotaphe stipendiaria Braun, 1925

Species of moth

Dichomeris stipendiaria is a moth in the family Gelechiidae. It was described by Annette Frances Braun in 1925. It is found in North America, where it has been recorded from southern British Columbia to Utah, Washington, California and Oregon.

The wingspan is 17–18 mm. Adults are on wing in July and August.

The larvae feed on Solidago and Erigeron species, as well as Aster eatonii.
