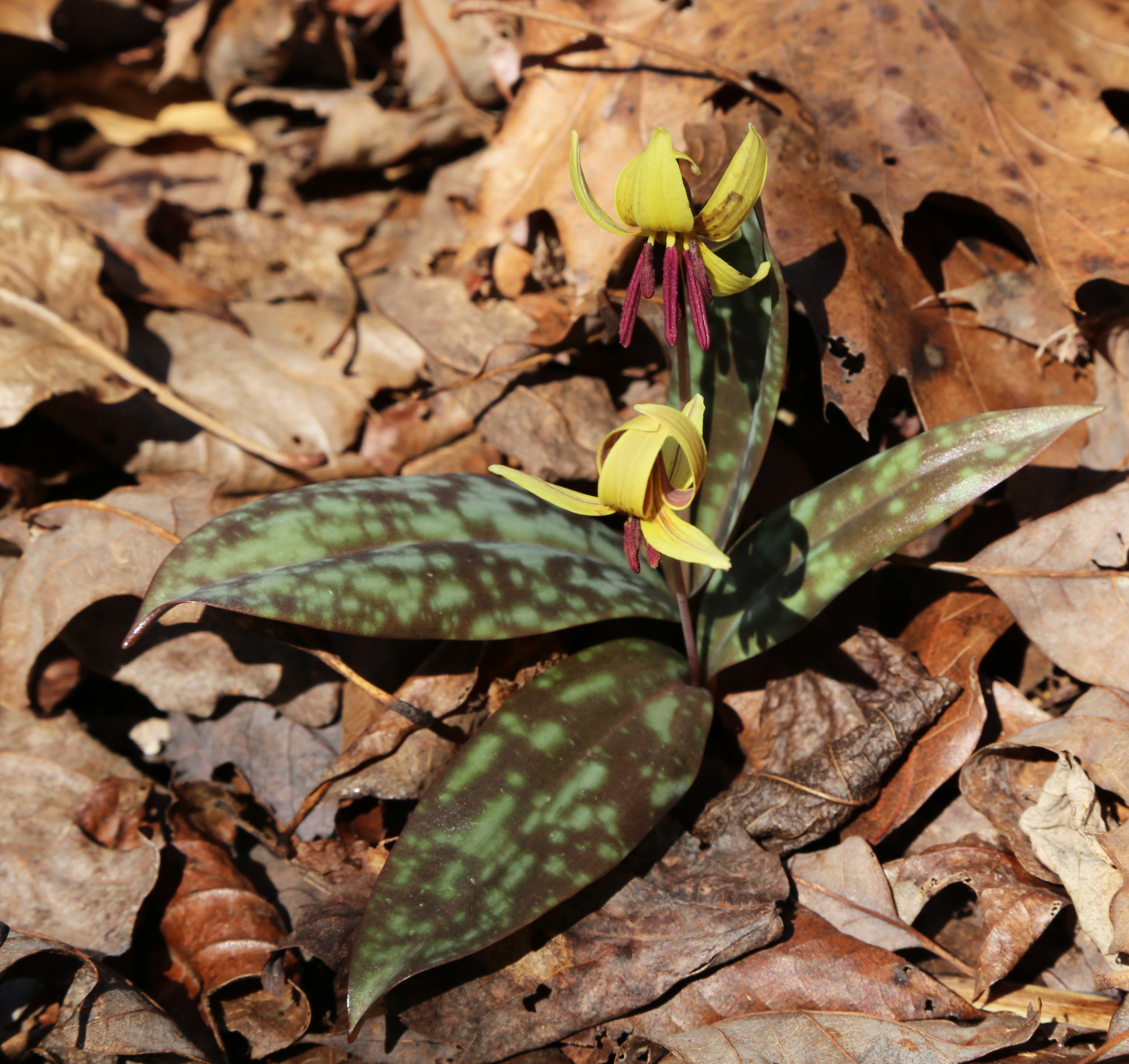

Scientific classification
- Kingdom: Plantae
- Clade: Tracheophytes
- Clade: Angiosperms
- Clade: Monocots
- Order: Liliales
- Family: Liliaceae
- Subfamily: Lilioideae
- Genus: Erythronium
- Species: E. umbilicatum

Binomial name
- Erythronium umbilicatum C.R.Parks & Hardin

= Erythronium umbilicatum =

Dimpled trout lily

Species of flowering plant

Erythronium umbilicatum, the dimpled trout lily, is a species of flowering plant in the lily family. It is native to the Southeastern United States, primarily in the Piedmont and Southern Appalachian areas. It is reported from West Virginia, Alabama, Florida, Georgia, Kentucky, Maryland, North Carolina, South Carolina and Virginia.

Erythronium umbilicatum is a spring ephemeral and its preferred habitat is forests. It has egg-shaped bulbs up to 25 cm long. Leaves are up to 20 cm long, mottled. Scape is up to 20 cm long, bearing one yellow flower, sometimes with brown spots on the tepals.

== Varieties ==
Two varieties are commonly recognized:

Erythronium umbilicatum subsp. monostolum C.R.Parks & Hardin—stolons present

Erythronium umbilicatum subsp. umbilicatum—stolons absent

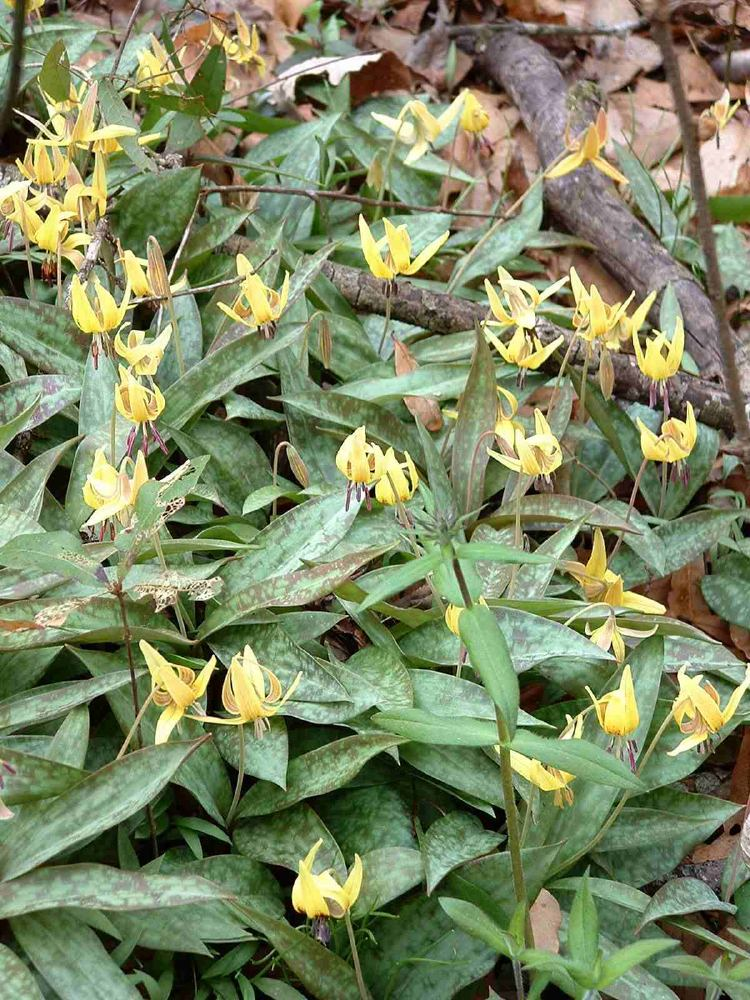
Dense patch of Erythronium umbilicatum, Gadsden Co., Florida
