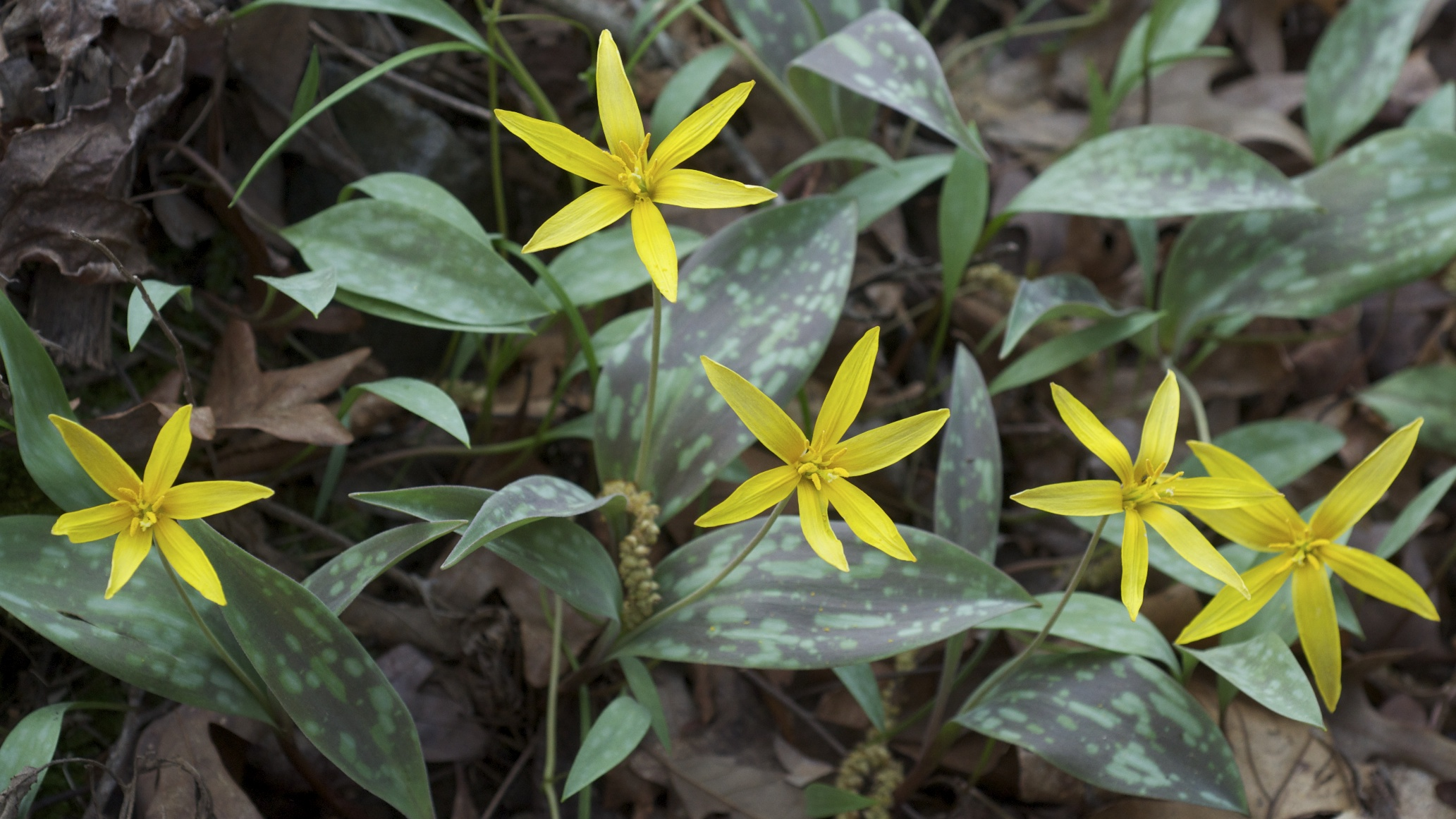

Conservation status
- Secure (NatureServe)

Scientific classification
- Kingdom: Plantae
- Clade: Tracheophytes
- Clade: Angiosperms
- Clade: Monocots
- Order: Liliales
- Family: Liliaceae
- Subfamily: Lilioideae
- Tribe: Lilieae
- Genus: Erythronium
- Species: E. rostratum

Binomial name
- Erythronium rostratum W.Wolf

= Erythronium rostratum =

Yellow fawn lily

Species of flowering plant

Erythronium rostratum, the yellow trout lily, yellow fawnlily, beaked trout lily, or golden-star, is a plant species native to the south-central part of the United States (Kansas, Missouri, Oklahoma, Ohio, Texas, Alabama, Arkansas, Kentucky, Louisiana, and Tennessee).

Erythronium rostratum produces egg-shaped bulbs up to 20 mm long. Leaves are lanceolate, up to 20 cm long. Scape is up to 10 cm tall, bearing one yellow flower.
