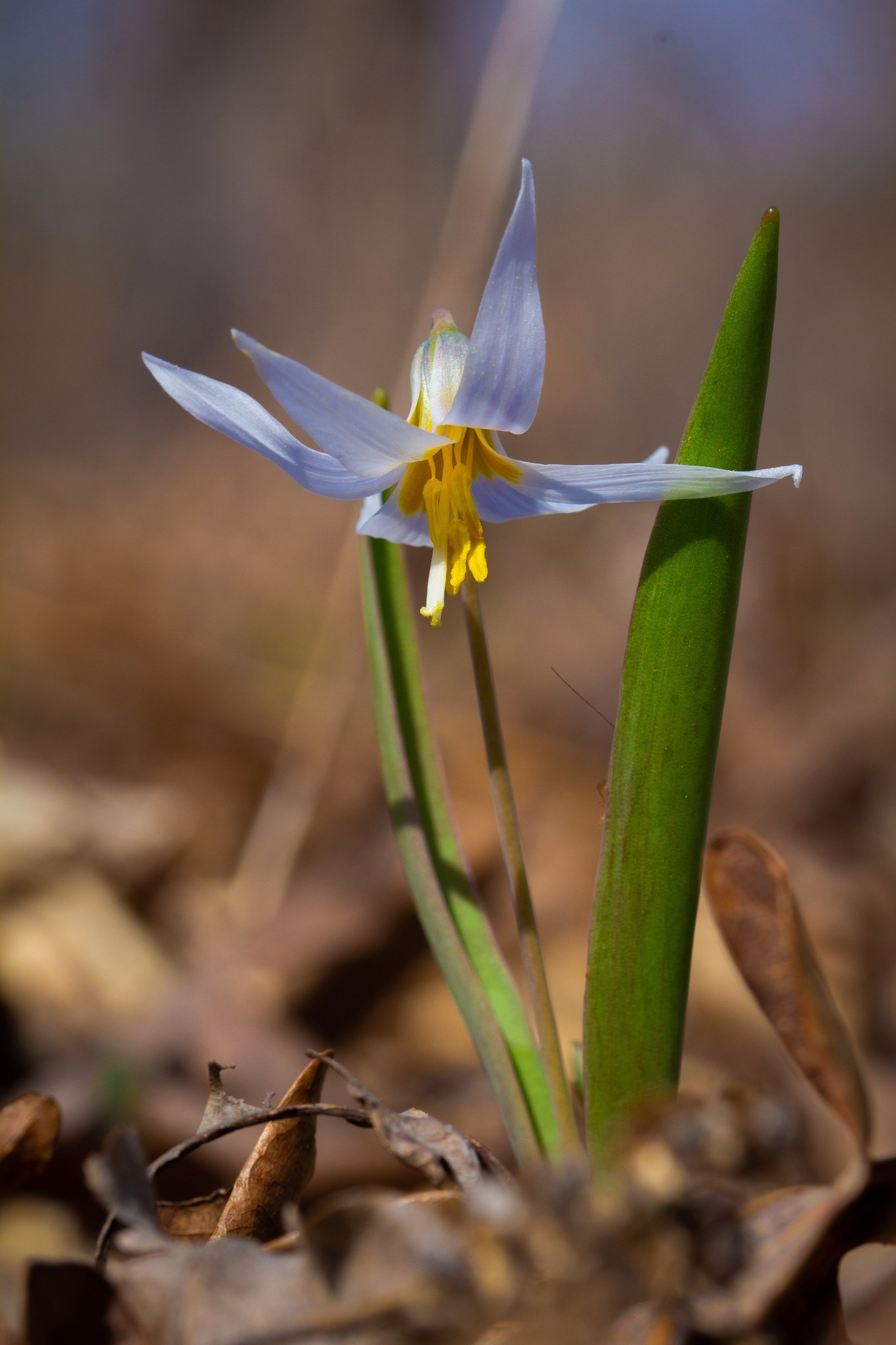

Conservation status
- Apparently Secure (NatureServe)

Scientific classification
- Kingdom: Plantae
- Clade: Tracheophytes
- Clade: Angiosperms
- Clade: Monocots
- Order: Liliales
- Family: Liliaceae
- Subfamily: Lilioideae
- Tribe: Lilieae
- Genus: Erythronium
- Species: E. mesochoreum

Binomial name
- Erythronium mesochoreum Knerr

= Erythronium mesochoreum =

Species of flowering plant

Erythronium mesochoreum, the prairie fawn lily or midland fawnlily, is a plant species in the lily family, native to the US states of Illinois, Iowa, Indiana, Nebraska, Kansas, Missouri, Oklahoma, Texas and Arkansas.

Erythronium mesochoreum forms flattened to egg-shaped corms up to 25 mm long. The corms grow offsets in a manner similar to tulips, creating new plants as well as setting seed. Leaves are elliptic to lanceolate, up to 14 cm long. Scape is up to 15 cm tall, bearing only one flower. Tepals are spreading at flowering time, white with blue or purple tinge on the underside and a yellow spot on the upper side. Anthers are yellow, and style is white.

== Cultivation ==
Prairie fawn lily is grown by wildflower gardeners particularly in areas in or near its habitat in the plains. It shows some adaptation to being grown in drier areas such as South Dakota.
