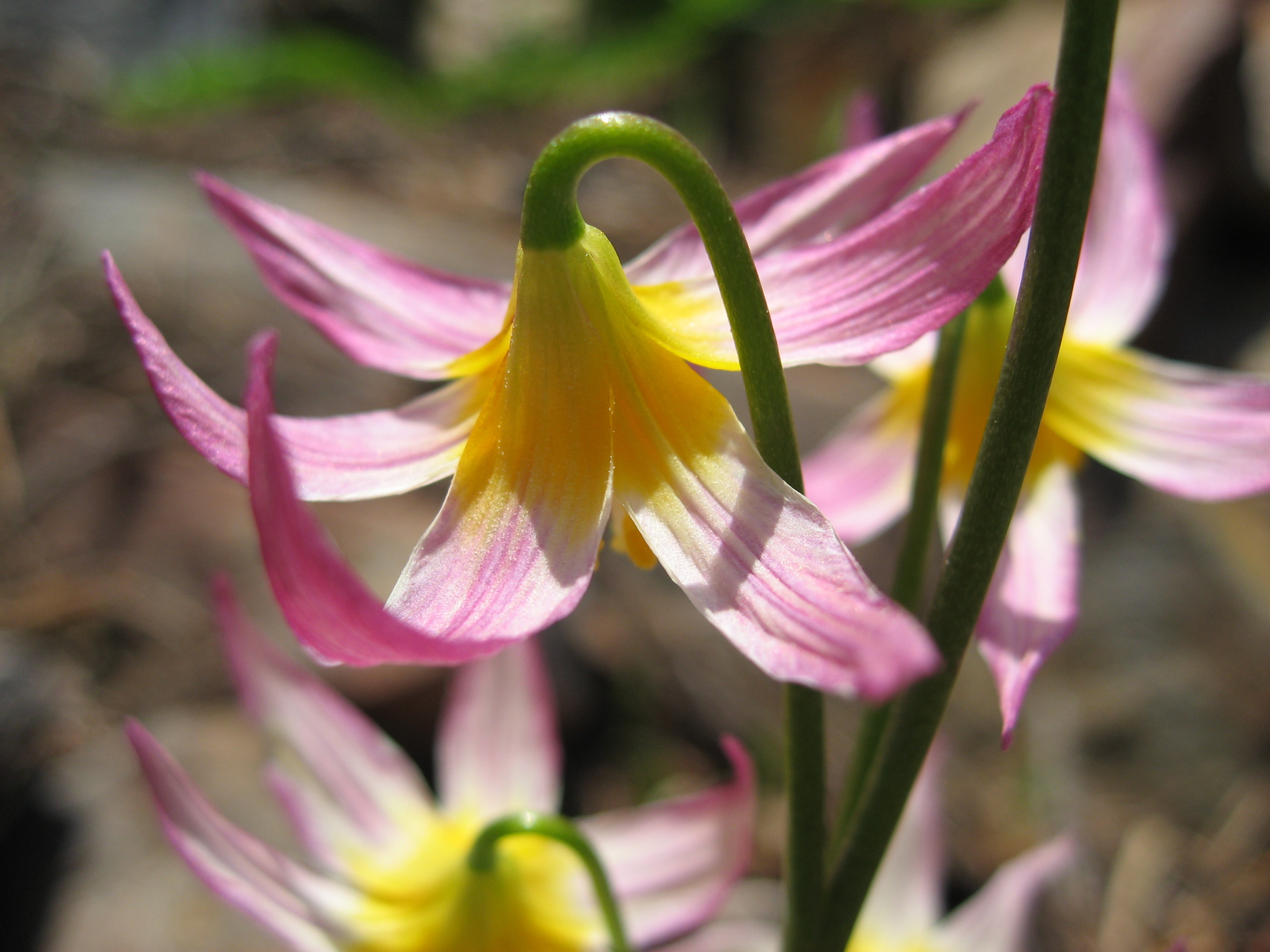

Scientific classification
- Kingdom: Plantae
- Clade: Tracheophytes
- Clade: Angiosperms
- Clade: Monocots
- Order: Liliales
- Family: Liliaceae
- Subfamily: Lilioideae
- Tribe: Lilieae
- Genus: Erythronium
- Species: E. purpurascens

Binomial name
- Erythronium purpurascens S.Wats.

Synonyms
- Synonymy: Erythronium grandiflorum var. multiflorum Torr.; Erythronium revolutum Baker 1876, illegitimate homonym not Sm. 1809; Erythronium purpurascens var. uniflorum S.Watson; Erythronium grandiflorum f. multiflorum (Torr.) Voss

= Erythronium purpurascens =

Species of flowering plant

Erythronium purpurascens is a species of flowering plant in the lily family which is known by the common names purple fawn lily and Sierra Nevada fawn lily.

It is endemic to California, where it grows in the high mountains of the southern Cascade Range, Coast Ranges, and northern Sierra Nevada from Siskiyou County south to Mendocino and Placer Counties.

== Description ==
This mountain wildflower, Erythronium purpurascens, grows from a bulb 2 to 4 centimeters long and produces two narrow green leaves up to 15 centimeters in length. The erect stalks reach a maximum of 20 centimeters tall and each bears one to six flowers. The flower has white tepals with yellow bases which turn purple with age. Each tepal is only one or two centimeters long and curls back. The stamens and their large anthers and the style are yellow. The flowers bloom as the last snow is melting, which might not be until summer at high elevations.
