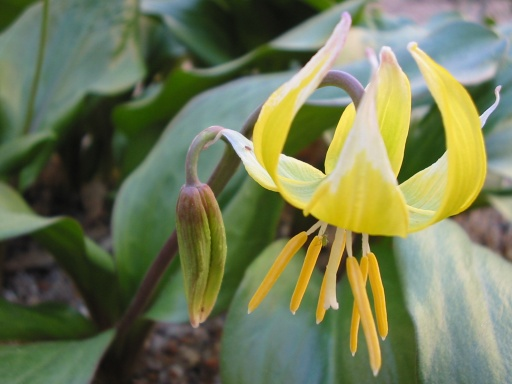
- 'Pagoda', Jardin des Plantes, Paris

Conservation status
- Imperiled (NatureServe)

Scientific classification
- Kingdom: Plantae
- Clade: Tracheophytes
- Clade: Angiosperms
- Clade: Monocots
- Order: Liliales
- Family: Liliaceae
- Subfamily: Lilioideae
- Genus: Erythronium
- Species: E. tuolumnense

Binomial name
- Erythronium tuolumnense Applegate

= Erythronium tuolumnense =

Tuolumne fawn lily

Species of flowering plant

Erythronium tuolumnense is a species of flowering plant in the family Liliaceae, known by the common name Tuolumne fawn lily or Tuolumne dog's tooth violet. However, it is neither a true lily nor a violet. It is endemic to the Sierra Nevada of Tuolumne County, California; from 600 m (1,969 ft) along Italian Bar Road up to 1,000 m (3,281 ft) altitude at the headwaters of Deer Creek.

This hardy perennial wildflower grows from a bulb 5–10 cm (2–4 in) wide, sometimes with associated bulblets. The bulb resembles a dog's tooth in shape and colour, hence the name "dog's tooth" (which also applies to other erythronium species such as E. dens-canis). It produces two small leaves and a reddish stalk up to 35 cm (14 in) tall bearing one to five flowers. The flower has bright yellow recurved tepals, a white style and white stamens tipped with large yellow anthers.

This rare plant is threatened by human activity such as logging in its small native range.

Inhabiting moist, light deciduous woodland, this plant is also found in cultivation. The species and the hybrid cultivar 'Pagoda' have gained the Royal Horticultural Society's Award of Garden Merit.

== Conservation ==
Known from only a small number of populations, the largest of which have over ten thousand individuals. Erythronium tuolumnense is listed as imperiled by NaturServe. It has a small historic range, and human activity, especially recreational off-road vehicle use threatens the largest population. Other threats include mining, garbage dumping, camping, logging and fire suppression.
