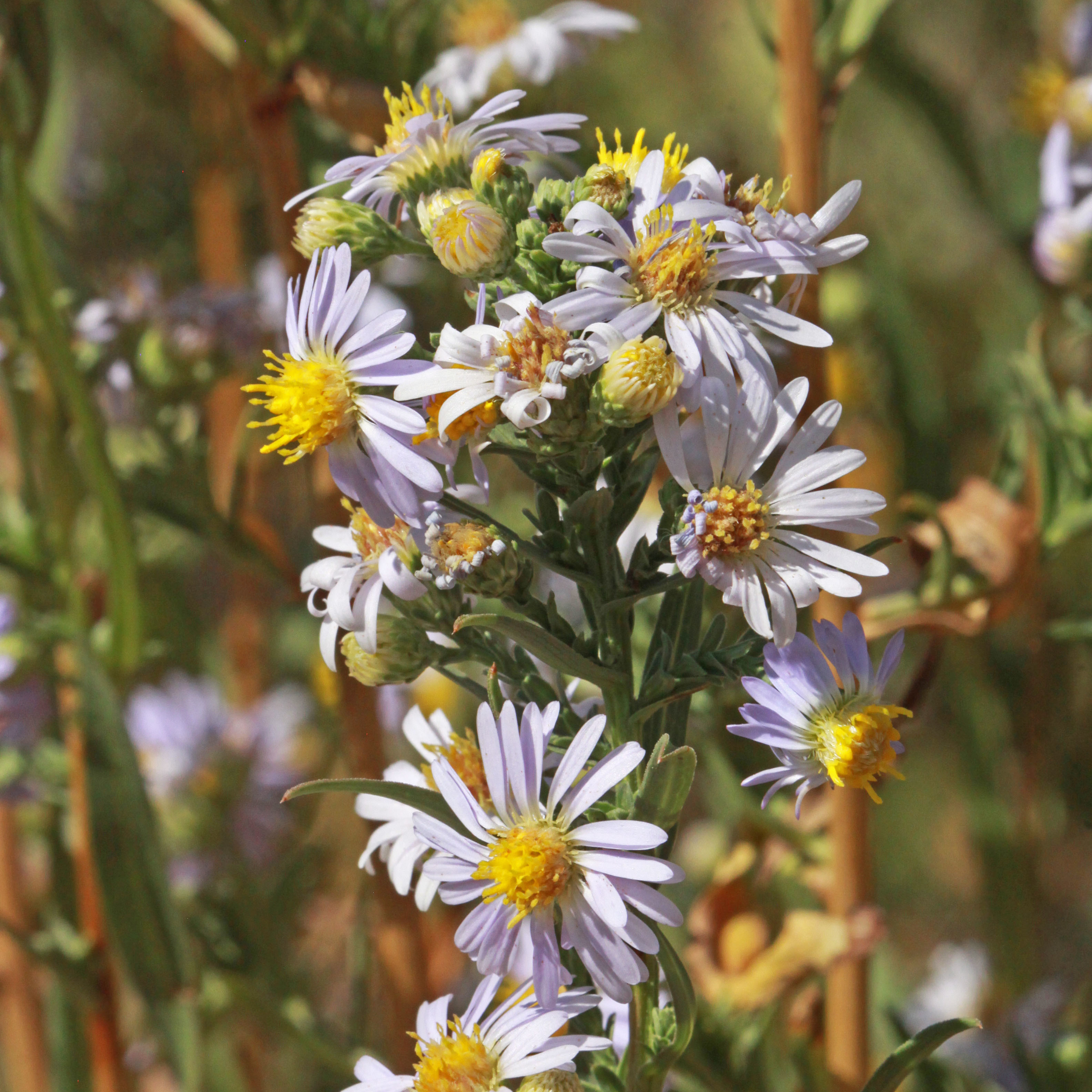

Conservation status
- Secure (NatureServe)

Scientific classification
- Kingdom: Plantae
- Clade: Embryophytes
- Clade: Tracheophytes
- Clade: Angiosperms
- Clade: Eudicots
- Clade: Asterids
- Order: Asterales
- Family: Asteraceae
- Tribe: Astereae
- Subtribe: Symphyotrichinae
- Genus: Symphyotrichum
- Subgenus: Symphyotrichum subg. Symphyotrichum
- Section: Symphyotrichum sect. Occidentales
- Species: S. eatonii

Binomial name
- Symphyotrichum eatonii (A.Gray) G.L.Nesom
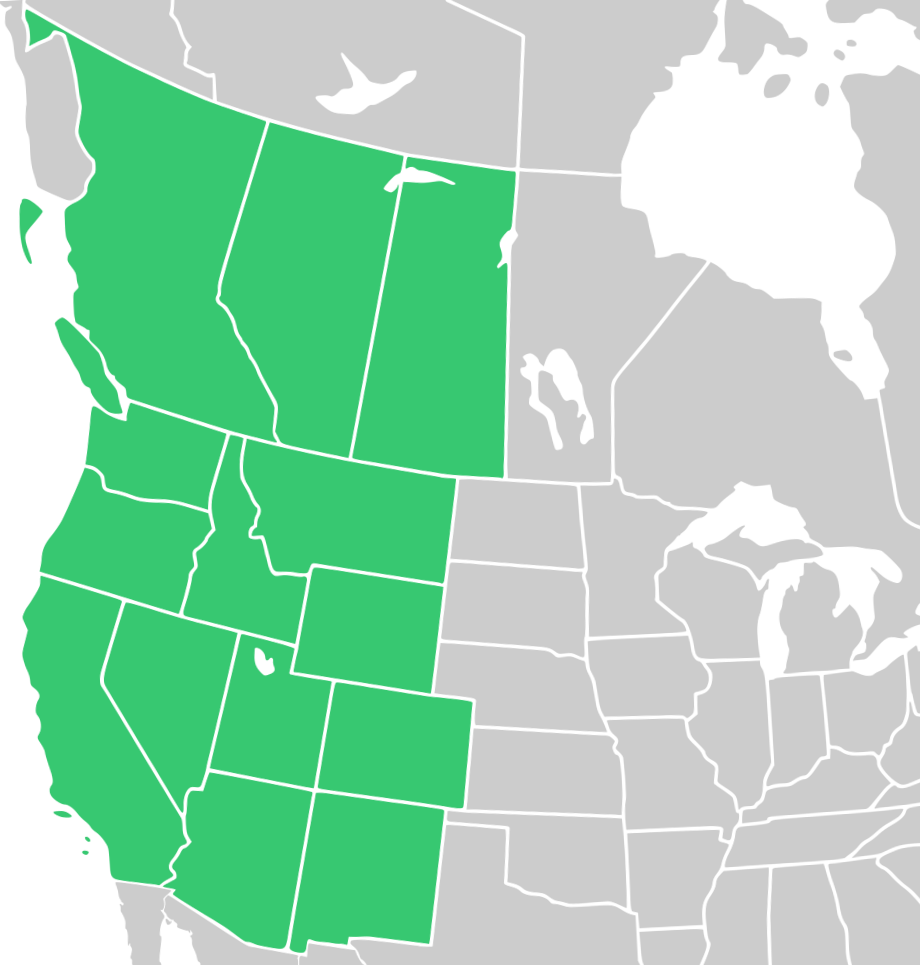
- Native distribution

Synonyms
- Aster bracteolatus Nutt.; Aster cordalenus L.F.Hend.; Aster eatonii (A.Gray) Howell; Aster foliaceus var. eatonii A.Gray; Aster mearnsii Rydb.; Symphyotrichum bracteolatum (Nutt.) G.L.Nesom

= Symphyotrichum eatonii =

Species of flowering plant in the aster family

Symphyotrichum eatonii (formerly Aster eatonii) is a species of aster known by the common name Eaton's aster. It is native to much of western North America from British Columbia to Saskatchewan, the Sierra Nevada in California, the Rocky Mountains region, to Arizona and New Mexico, where it grows in many habitats, especially wet areas such as meadows and near ditches. It is also known by the scientific name Symphyotrichum bracteolatum.

== Description ==
Symphyotrichum eatonii is a perennial herb growing 40–100 centimeters (1 foot 4 inches – 3 feet 3 inches) from a short rhizome. The thin leaves are up to 20 centimeters (8 inches) long, lance-shaped, and pointed at the tips. Some of the leaves and the upper parts of the stem are hairy.

The inflorescence holds several flower heads containing many white to pink ray florets around a center of yellow disk florets. The fruit is a hairy cypsela that resembles an achene.

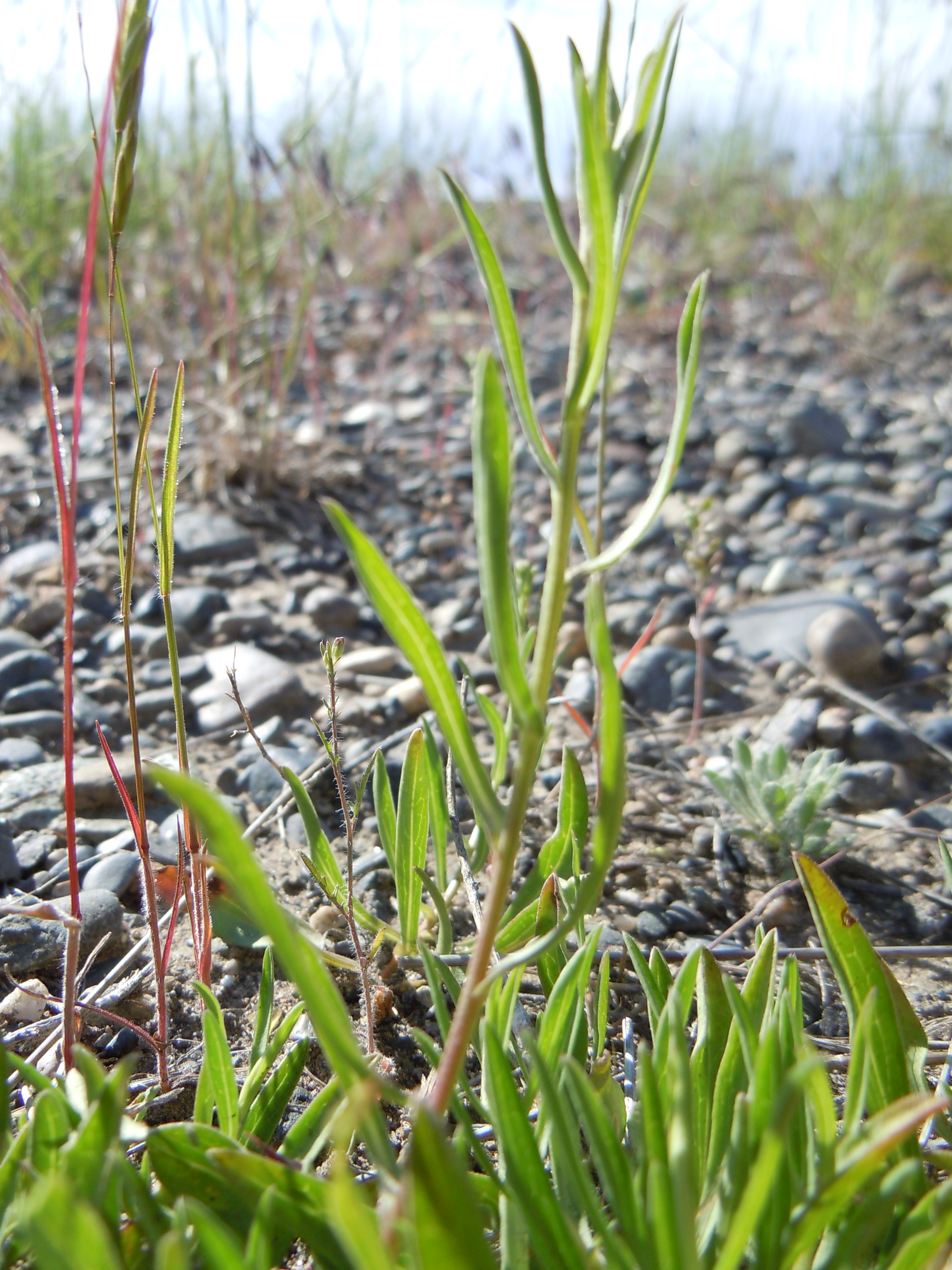

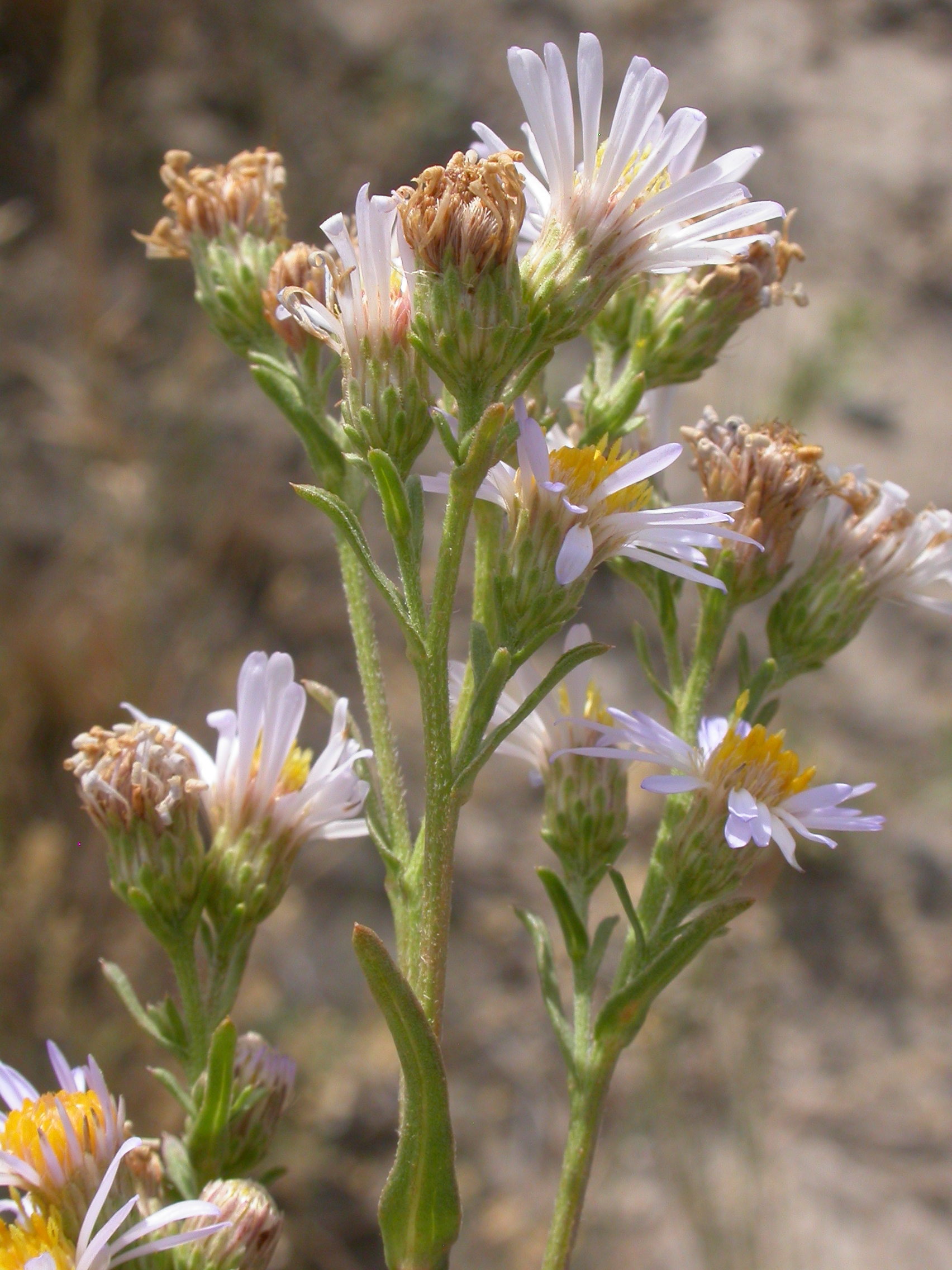

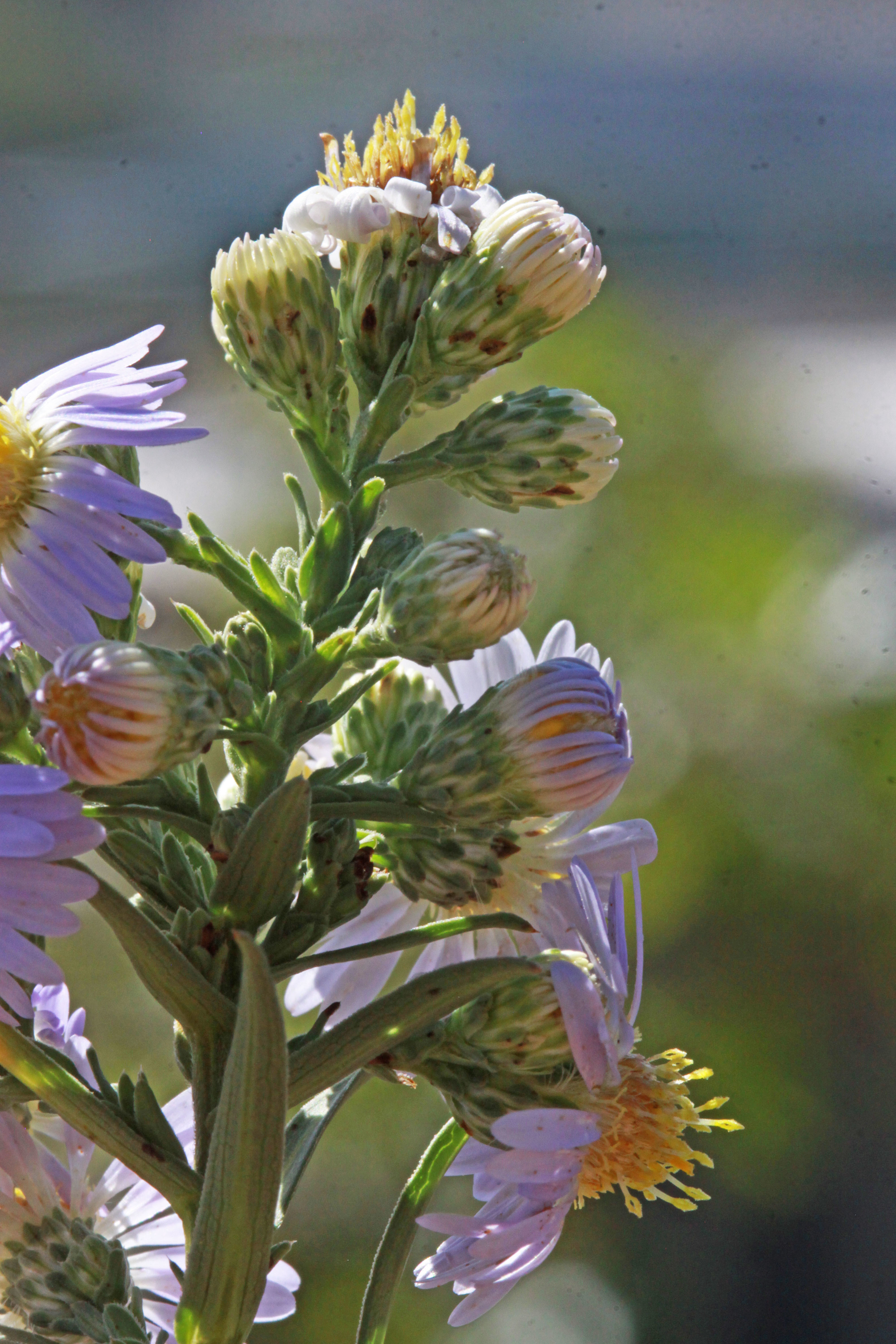

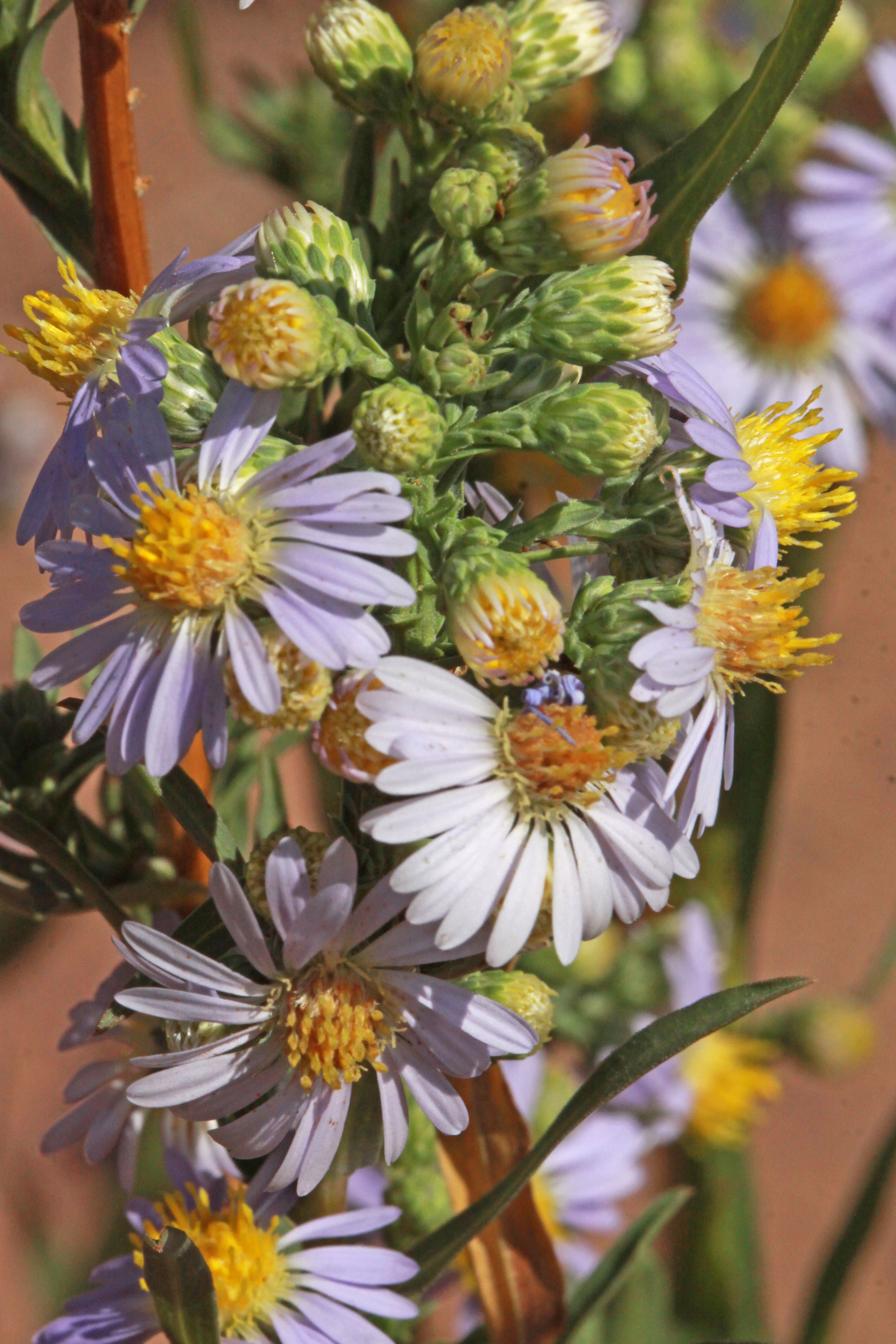

== Taxonomy ==
Symphyotrichum eatonii is classified in the subgenus Symphyotrichum, section Occidentales. As of June 2021, Catalogue of Life, Flora of North America, and Jepson eFlora accepted this species as Symphyotrichum bracteolatum, while POWO, NatureServe, and Canadian botanist John C. Semple circumscribed to S. eatonii.

== Bibliography ==
- Allen, G.A. (2012). "Symphyotrichum bracteolatum". In Jepson Flora Project (ed.). Jepson eFlora. The Jepson Herbarium, University of California, Berkeley.
- Brouillet, L.; Semple, J.C.; Allen, G.A.; Chambers, K.L.; Sundberg, S.D. (6 November 2020). "Symphyotrichum bracteolatum". Flora of North America (floranorthamerica.org). Point Arena, California: Flora of North America Association.
- Hassler, M. (17 March 2021). "Symphyotrichum bracteolatum (Nutt.) G. L. Nesom – World Plants: Synonymic Checklists of the Vascular Plants of the World". In Roskov, Y.; Ower, G.; Orrell, T.; Nicolson, D.; Bailly, N.; Kirk, P.M.; Bourgoin, T.; DeWalt, R.E.; Decock, W.; van Nieukerken, E.J.; Penev, L. (eds.). Species 2000 & ITIS Catalogue of Life, 10 June 2021. Leiden, Netherlands: Naturalis Biodiversity Center. ISSN 2405-8858.
- NatureServe (4 June 2021). "Symphyotrichum eatonii - Eaton's Aster". NatureServe Explorer (explorer.natureserve.org). Arlington, Virginia: NatureServe.
- POWO (2021). "Symphyotrichum bracteolatum (Nutt.) G.L.Nesom". Plants of the World Online. Royal Botanic Gardens, Kew.
- Semple, J.C. (17 May 2021). "Symphyotrichum eatonii". Ontario: University of Waterloo. Archived from the original on 21 June 2021.
- NRCS (2015). "Symphyotrichum eatonii". PLANTS Database. United States Department of Agriculture (USDA).
