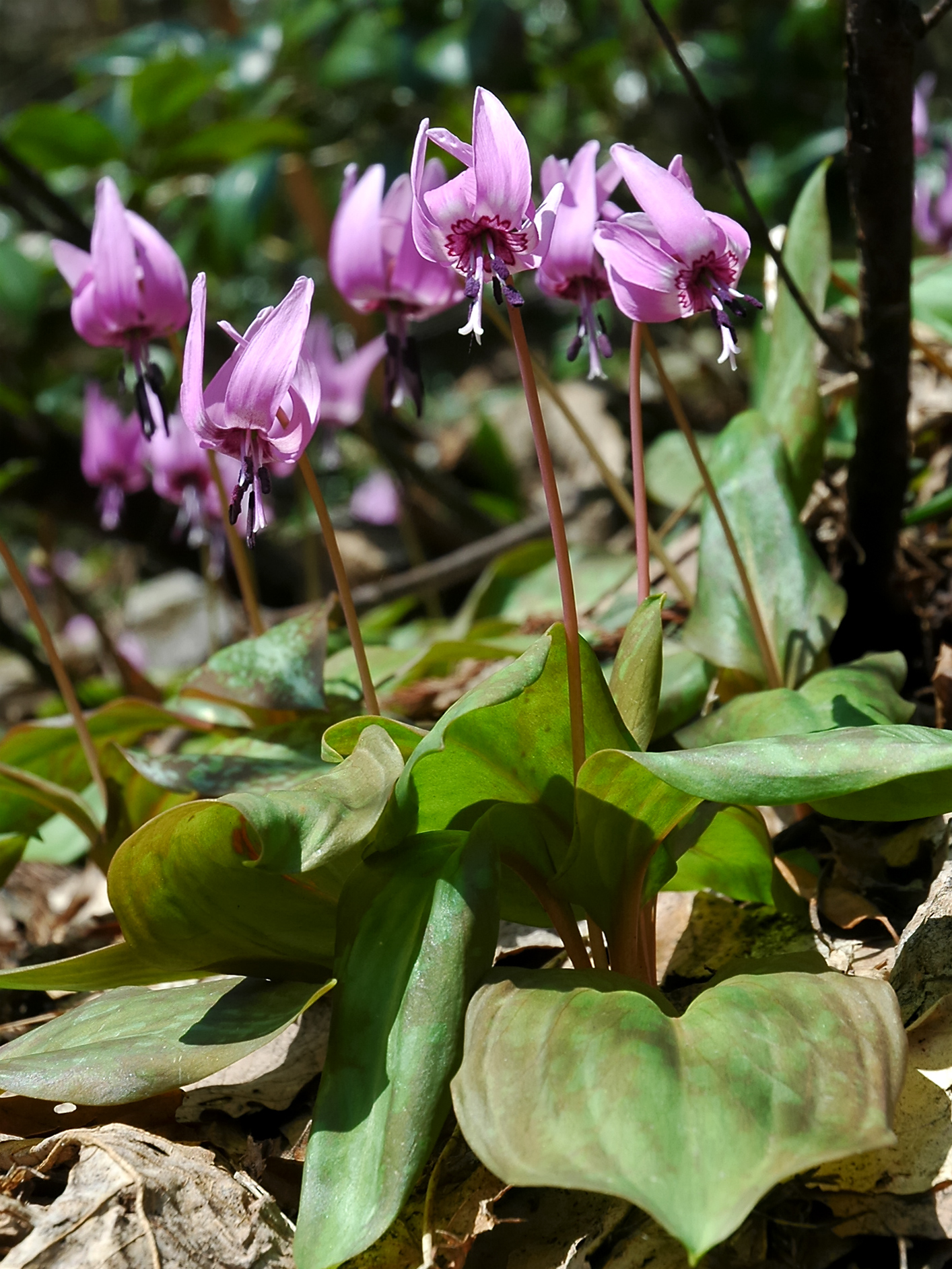

Scientific classification
- Kingdom: Plantae
- Clade: Tracheophytes
- Clade: Angiosperms
- Clade: Monocots
- Order: Liliales
- Family: Liliaceae
- Subfamily: Lilioideae
- Genus: Erythronium
- Species: E. japonicum

Binomial name
- Erythronium japonicum Decne.

Synonyms
- Erythronium japonicum Poit.; Erythronium japonicum f. album C.F. Fang; Erythronium japonicum f. immaculatum P.Y.Fu & Q.S.Sun; Erythronium japonicum f. immaculatum Sun, Q.S.; Erythronium japonicum var. leucanthum I.Yamam. & Tsukam.; Erythronium japonicum f. leucanthum (I.Yamam. & Tsukam.) Okuyama

= Erythronium japonicum =

Species of flowering plant

Erythronium japonicum, known as Asian fawn lily, Oriental fawn lily, Japanese fawn lily is a pink-flowered species trout lily, belonging to the Lily family and native to Japan, Korea, the Russian Far East (Sakhalin Island, Kuril Islands) and northeastern China (Jilin and Liaoning). It is a spring ephemeral, blooming April–June in woodlands. It is known as zhūyáhuā (猪牙花) in Chinese, eolleji (얼레지) in Korean, and katakuri (片栗) in Japanese.

Erythronium japonicum has a stem up to 20 centimetres (7.9 in) long, although as much as 30% of the stem may be underground. Bulb is elongated, up to 6 cm (2.4 in) long but rarely more than 1 cm wide (0.39 in). Leaves are broadly elliptical to lanceolate, the blade up to 12 cm (4.7 in) long and 7 cm (2.8 in) wide. Flowers are solitary, rose-colored.

Applying the generic common name trout lily may be somewhat of a misnomer, because in the Japanese species, the individual plant may or may not exhibit the flecked dark markings on the leaves, which is emblematic of that common name (see gallery below).

== Protective status ==
Reporting is mixed on whether it should be regarded as endangered in Japan. One source adds it to a list of wildflowers that should be included as endangered, but the so-called Eco kentei or environmental specialist certification, run by the Tokyo Chamber of Commerce and Industry (TCCI), has had an exam question in the past, where the correct answer to "Is katakuri endangered" was "no". The Japanese ministry (MOE)'s version of the Red Data Book has not handed down an assessment of the whole species, even though in the Red Data Book compiled by individual prefectures, its status is evaluated at "near threatened" (jun-zetsumetsu kigu shu) in Hyōgo and Mie, and rated vulnerable-endangered in Shikoku and southern Kanto.

This woodland plant is more vulnerable, since it has a very short season and is slow-growing. It needs to grow into a 7–8 year old plant before it finally blooms, so will not rebound in numbers once taken. In Niiharu (Midori-ku, Yokohama), the colony was entirely wiped out (poached) overnight shortly after media coverage about it blooming in the area.

A colony in Tokyo can be viewed at Shimizuyama-ikoi-no-mori, in Nerima-ku. Nearby, the Tomitaro Makino Memorial Garden also has a small number of plants planted.

== Uses ==
The katakuriko (片栗粉, "katakuri powder"), is a starch that bears the name of this plant, which originally refers to the starch from the E. japonicum bulb. Because of its small quantity, this starch is no longer common; potato starch has taken its place and name nowadays.

This plant is not known to be farmed, and has been harvested from wild colonies by poachers, but probably not by seekers of starch sources, but by wildflower enthusiasts or traffickers.

The plant powder was also used as ointment to treat rashes.

The rumor that it is used in wagashi, particularly in the confection called katakuri-rakugan is apocryphal, since historian Kahei Mori states that this confection, which used to be traditionally presented to Morioka Domain, was made from the starch of lily bulbs.

== Additional photos ==
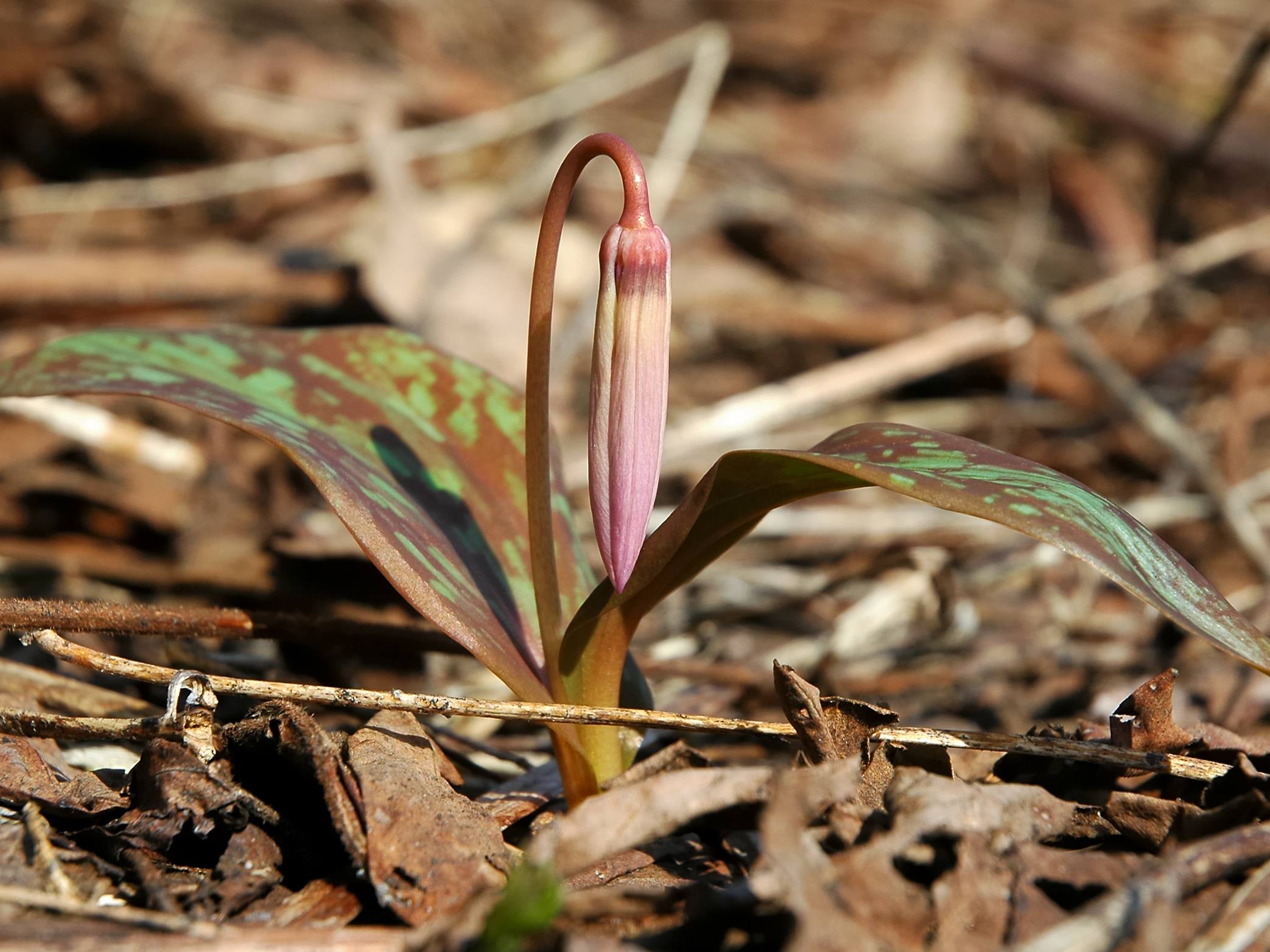

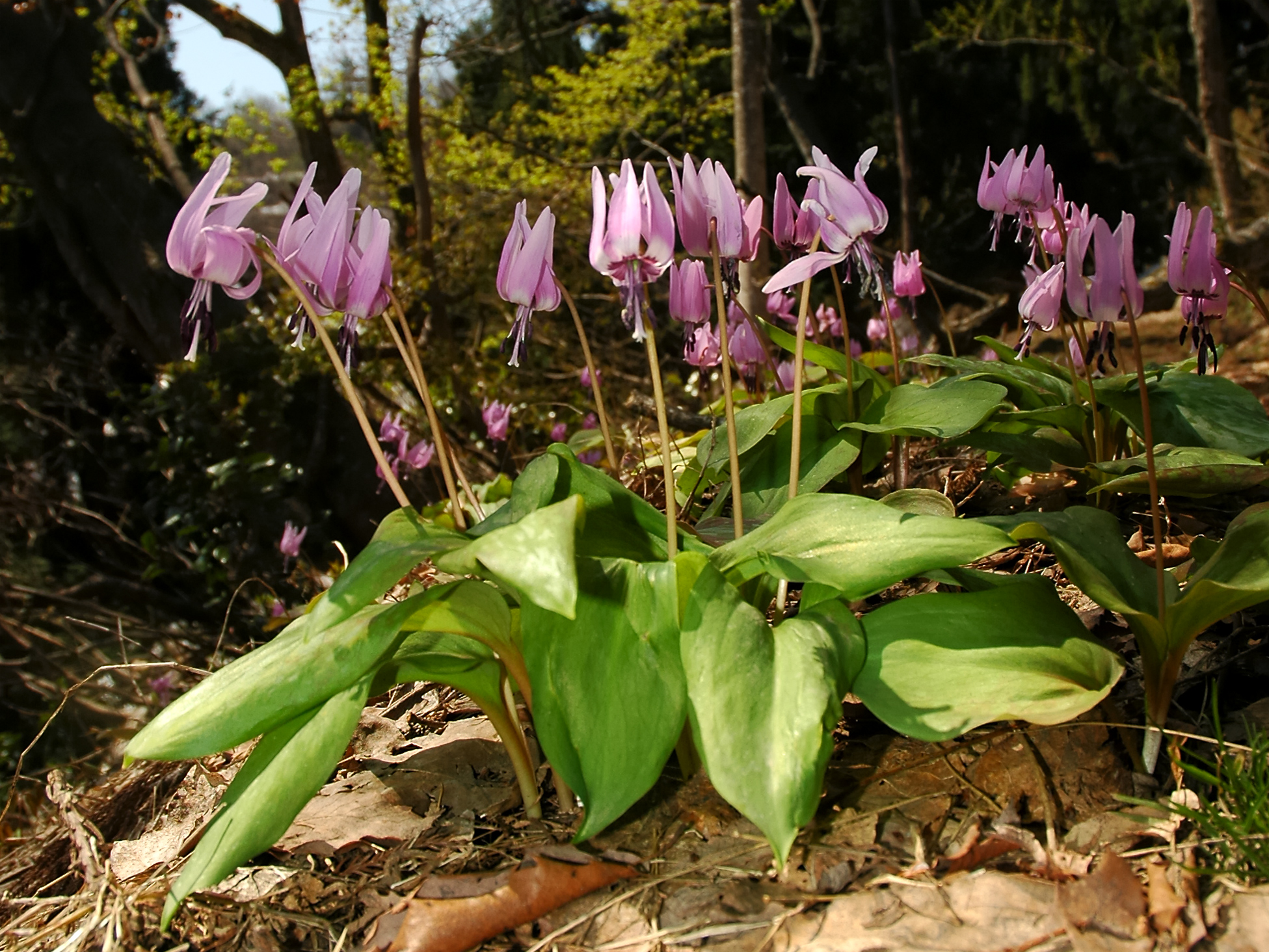

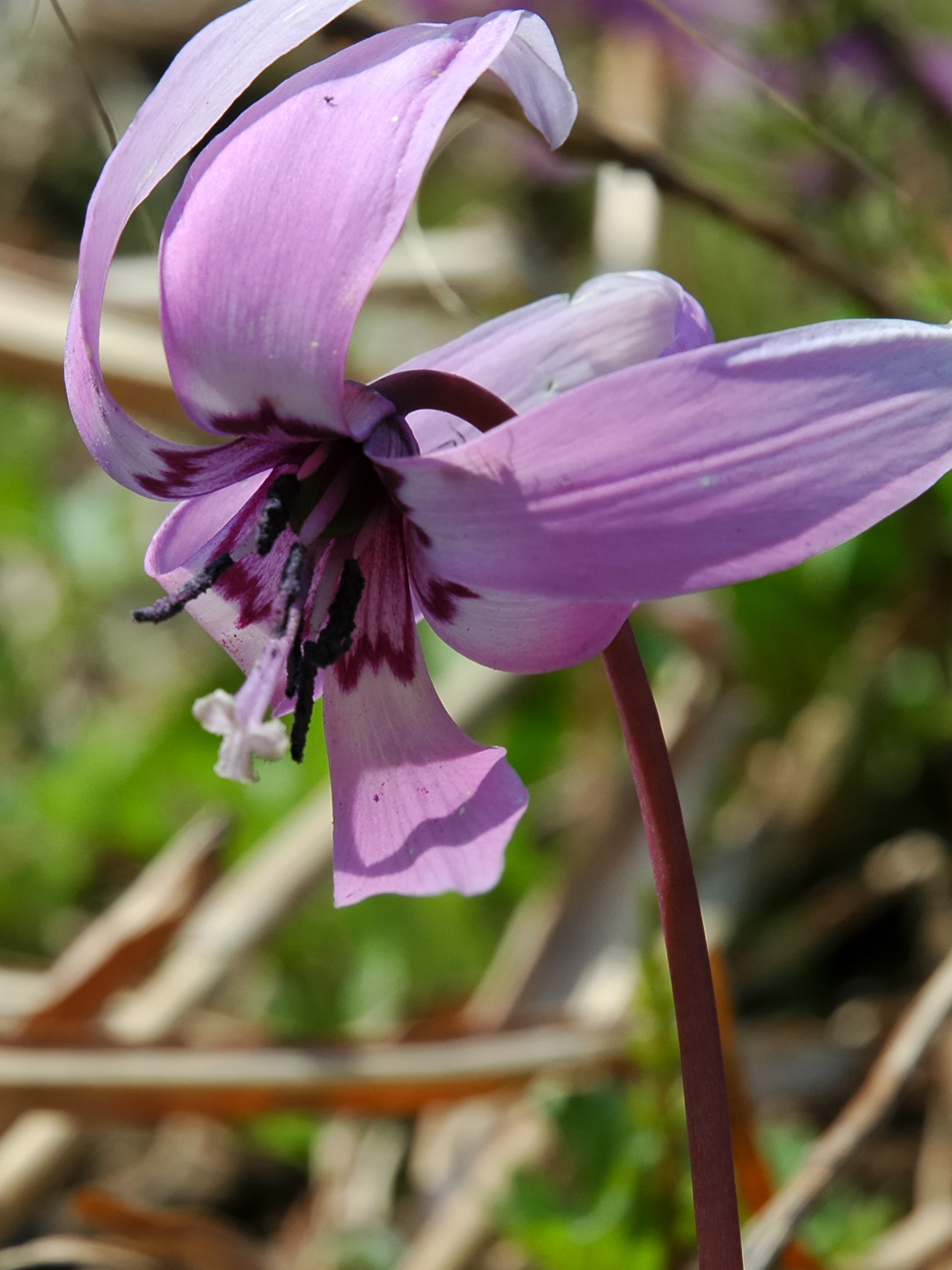
- line drawing of Erythronium japonicum, Flora of China Illustrations vol. 24, fig. 109, 5-7
