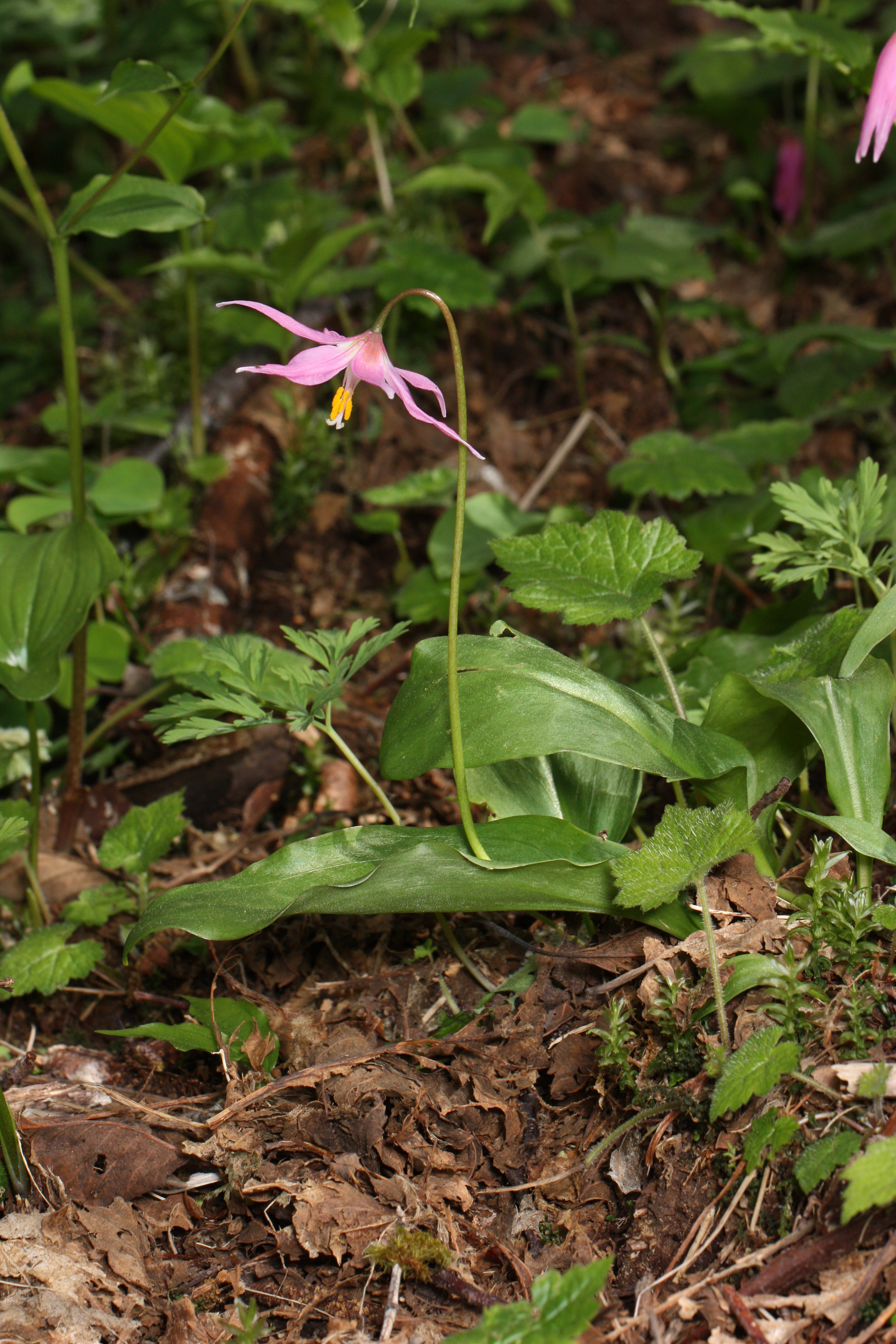

Scientific classification
- Kingdom: Plantae
- Clade: Tracheophytes
- Clade: Angiosperms
- Clade: Monocots
- Order: Liliales
- Family: Liliaceae
- Subfamily: Lilioideae
- Genus: Erythronium
- Species: E. revolutum

Binomial name
- Erythronium revolutum Sm.

Synonyms
- Erythronium grandiflorum f. grandiflorum (Sm.) Voss Erythronium grandiflorum var. smithii Hook. Erythronium johnsonii Bol. Erythronium smithii Orcutt

= Erythronium revolutum =

Species of flowering plant

Erythronium revolutum is a species of flowering plant in the family Liliaceae which is known by several common names, including mahogany fawn lily, coast fawn lily, and pink fawn lily. It is native to the west coast of North America.

== Description ==
Erythronium revolutum, a hardy perennial wildflower, grows from an oval-shaped bulb 3–5 cm (1–2 in) long, producing usually two wide, flat, mottled green leaves near the ground. It is indigenous to Northwest Washington.

The plant flowers between March and June. Each bulb sends up a long, naked stalk bearing one or two showy lily flowers. The stalk bows at the end so that the face of the flower points at the ground. There are six tepals in shades of pink or light purple which may have yellow or white spotting toward the center of the flower. The tepals may be straight or recurved so far that their tips meet behind the flower; they tend to recurve further as the flower ages. The anthers are bright yellow.

Erythronium revolutum can be distinguished from related species by its pink flowers, swollen anther filaments and mottled leaves.

The fruit is a capsule up to 6 cm (2 in) long.

== Distribution and habitat ==
Erythronium revolutum is native to western North America, from coastal Northern California to British Columbia, including Vancouver Island. It grows in wet areas in forests and along stream banks.

== Ecology ==
Erythronium revolutum is most abundant within 100 miles (161 km) of the coast, at altitudes of less than 1000 m. The plant is found in moist places such as streambanks, bogs, and wet redwood and mixed evergreen forest understory. It is slow-growing, taking 5–7 years to form a flowering size bulb, and therefore is slow to establish in new locations.

These habitats are threatened in the wild and in addition, E. revolutum may be threatened by collection for horticulture and soil compaction by forestry machinery.

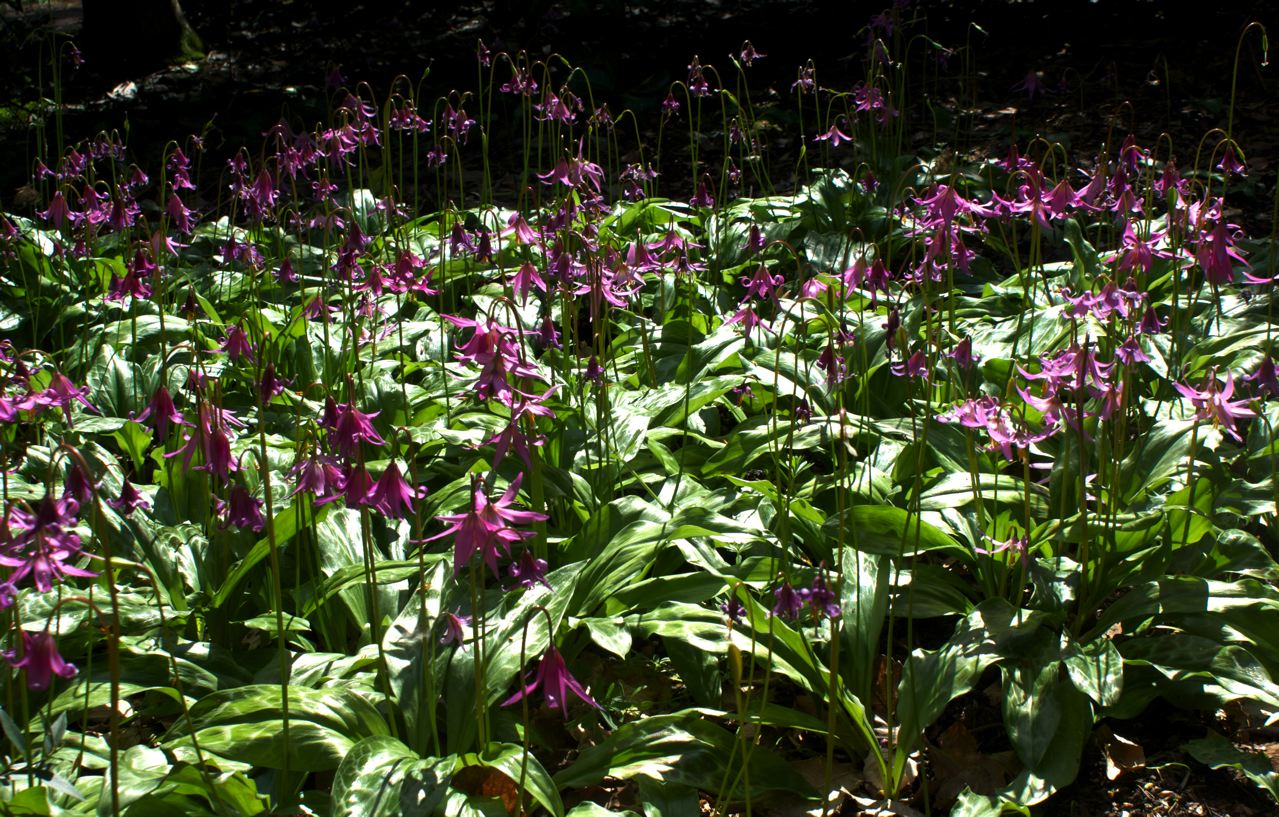
Growing in the woodland garden at Knightshayes Court, Devon (UK)

== Cultivation ==
Erythronium revolutum is cultivated as an ornamental plant, for use in traditional and natural gardens. Its combination of attractively patterned leaves and graceful flowers in mid spring make it a desirable plant. The best forms (often called var. johnstonii) have darker, richer pink flowers and well marked foliage. It should be planted in a shady spot (ideally beneath deciduous trees or shrubs) in humus-rich soil that does not dry out and is rather damp in spring. It will naturalise over time by self-seeding, though as seedlings take several years to reach flowering size this can be a slow process.
