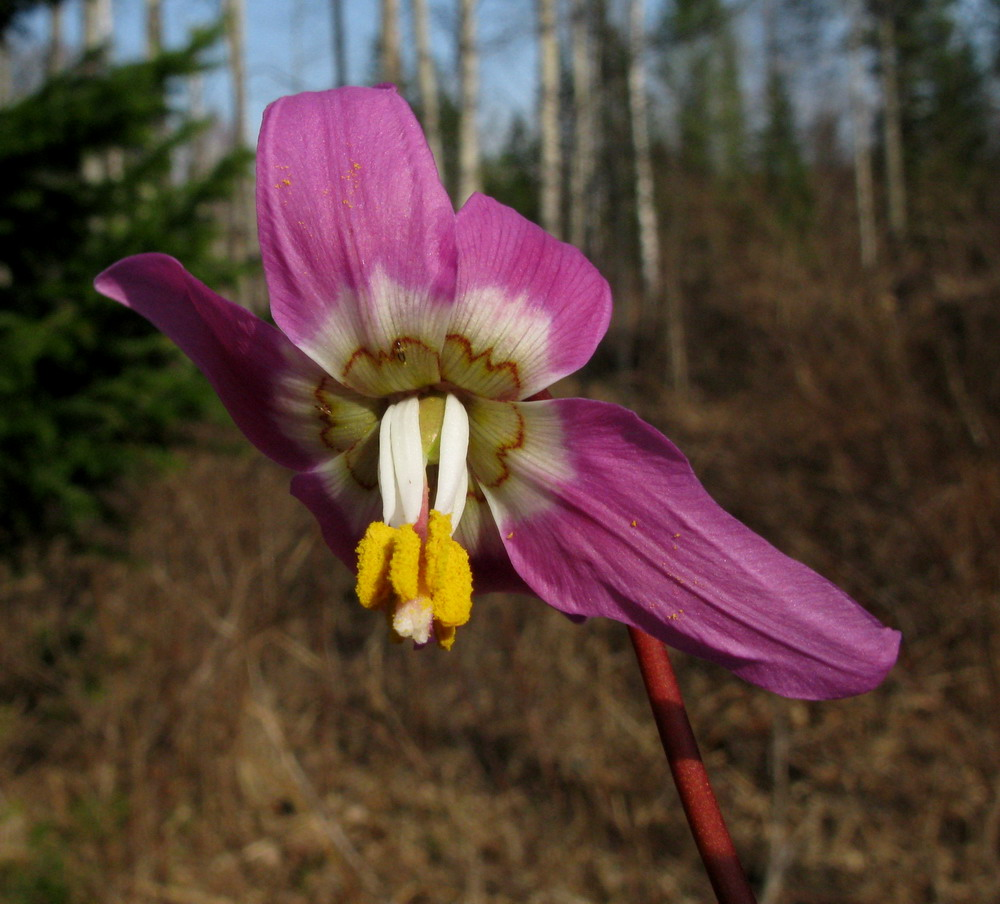

Scientific classification
- Kingdom: Plantae
- Clade: Embryophytes
- Clade: Tracheophytes
- Clade: Spermatophytes
- Clade: Angiosperms
- Clade: Monocots
- Order: Liliales
- Family: Liliaceae
- Subfamily: Lilioideae
- Genus: Erythronium
- Species: E. sajanense

Binomial name
- Erythronium sajanense Stepanov & Stassova

= Erythronium sajanense =

Species of plant in Siberia

Erythronium sajanense is a plant endemic to the Krasnoyarsk (Красноярск) region in Siberia.
