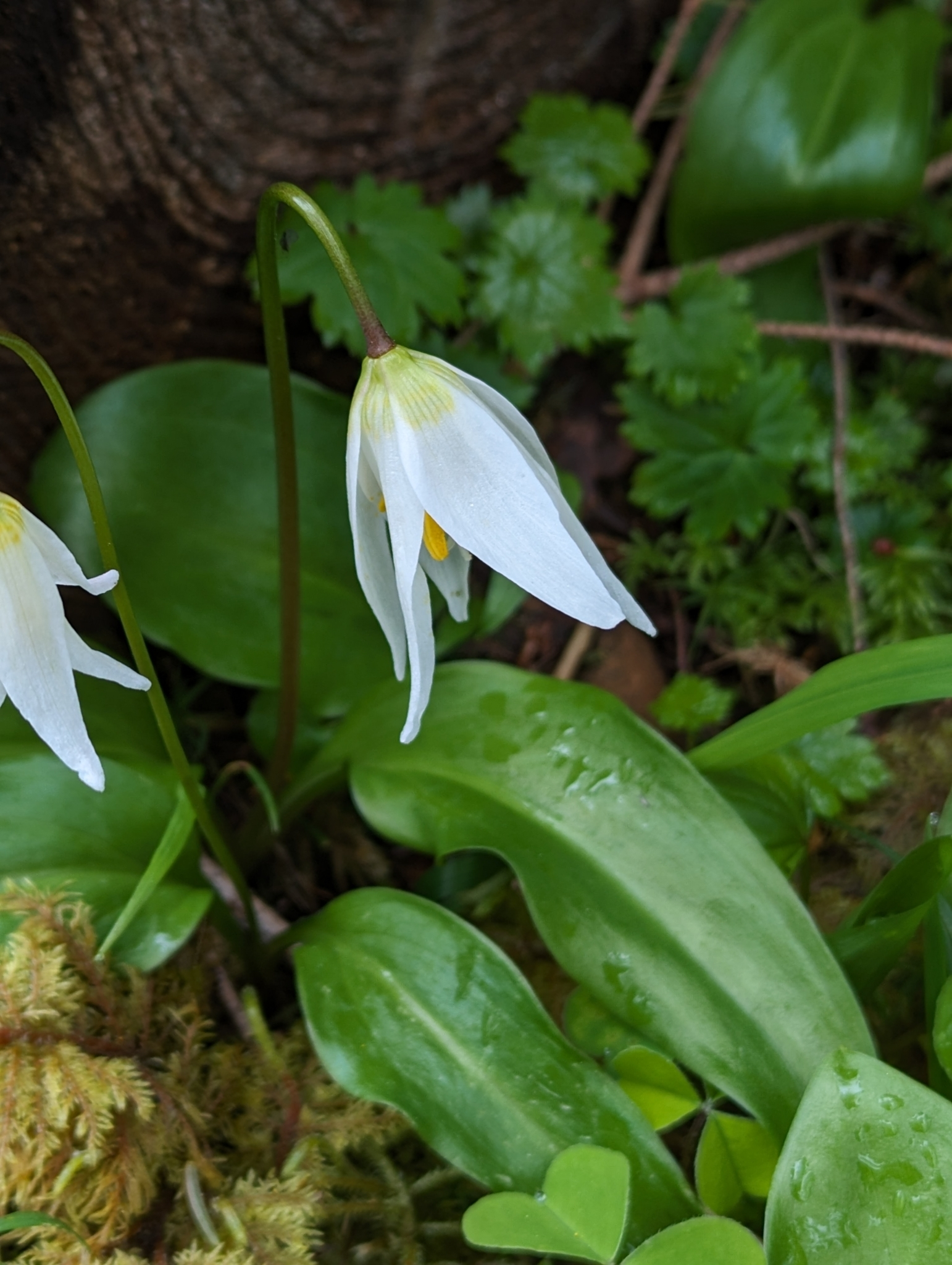

Conservation status
- Imperiled (NatureServe)

Scientific classification
- Kingdom: Plantae
- Clade: Embryophytes
- Clade: Tracheophytes
- Clade: Spermatophytes
- Clade: Angiosperms
- Clade: Monocots
- Order: Liliales
- Family: Liliaceae
- Subfamily: Lilioideae
- Genus: Erythronium
- Species: E. elegans

Binomial name
- Erythronium elegans Hammond & K.L. Chambers

= Erythronium elegans =

Species of plant

Erythronium elegans is a rare species of flowering plant in the lily family known by the common names Coast Range fawnlily and elegant fawnlily. It is endemic to Oregon in the United States, where it is known from about 12 occurrences in the northern Coast Range.

This plant grows from a slender bulb 3 to 5 centimeters long. It produces two leaves up to 20 centimeters long which are green, sometimes with brownish or white mottling. The scape grows up to 30 centimeters tall and bears one to four flowers. The flower has six tepals, the inner three white and the outer three white tinged with pink. The tepals have yellow bands near the bases. They are 2 to 4 centimeters long. The protruding stamens are tipped with yellow anthers each 1 to 2 centimeters long. Blooming occurs in May and June.

This plant is very restricted in distribution but it grows in a range of habitat conditions, with varying light and moisture levels. It can be found in open and deep forests, the edges of bogs, cliffs, and meadows. The local forests are dominated by Douglas-fir (Pseudotsuga menziesii) and other plants in the habitat may include Pacific silver fir (Abies amabilis), western redcedar (Thuja plicata), spruce (Picea sp.), false lily-of-the-valley (Maianthemum dilatatum), California glacier lily (Erythronium grandiflorum var. pallidum), strawberry (Fragaria sp.), snowberry (Gaultheria sp.), blueberry (Vaccinium sp.), and lupine (Lupinus spp.).

In the wild this plant appears to be a poor competitor, persisting in areas with low soil nutrients where competition with other plants is low. However, it has been shown to grow well in cultivation.
