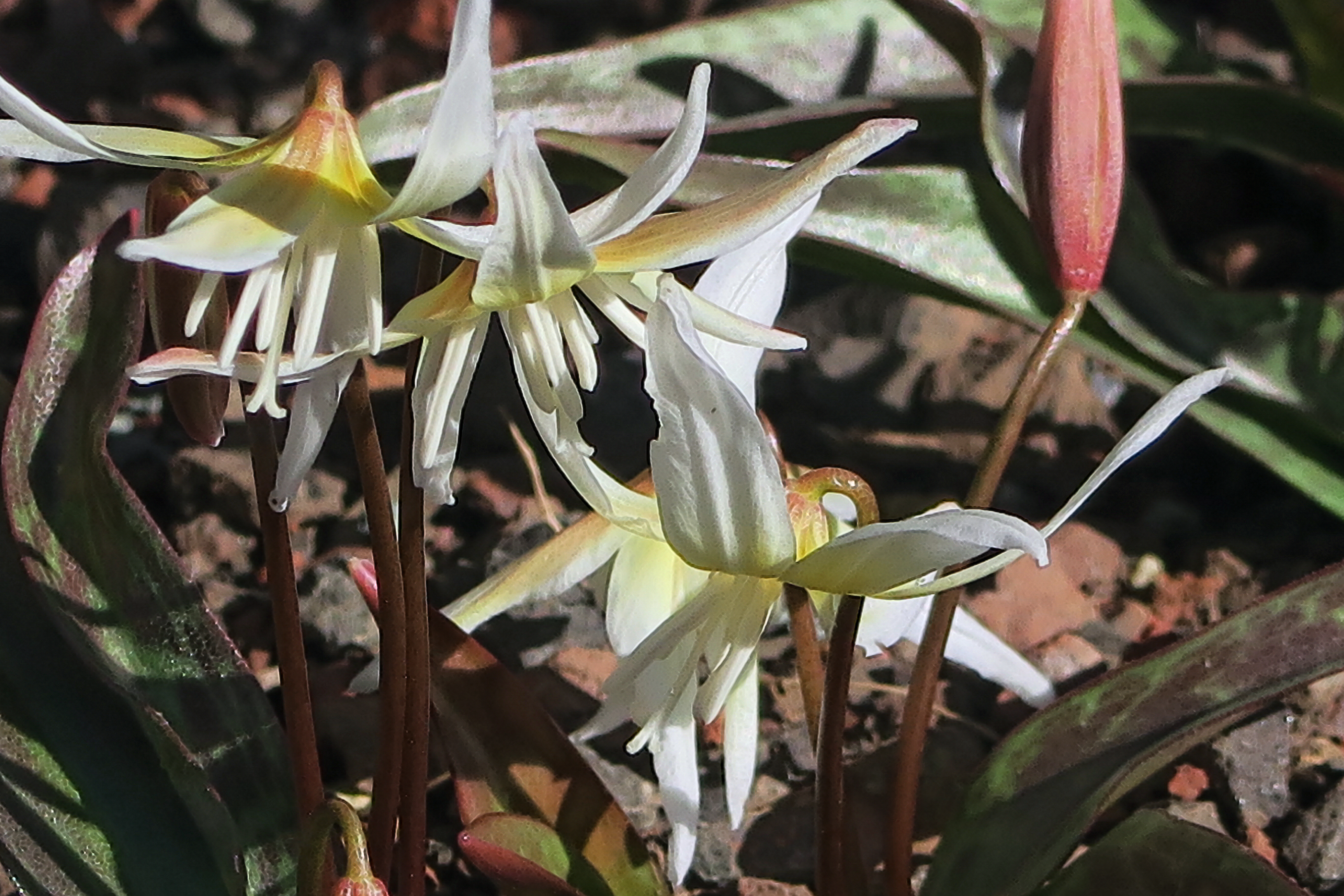

Scientific classification
- Kingdom: Plantae
- Clade: Tracheophytes
- Clade: Angiosperms
- Clade: Monocots
- Order: Liliales
- Family: Liliaceae
- Subfamily: Lilioideae
- Tribe: Lilieae
- Genus: Erythronium
- Species: E. multiscapideum

Binomial name
- Erythronium multiscapideum (Kellogg) A. Nels. & Kennedy

Synonyms
- Erythronium multiscapoideum misspelling, see IPNI; Fritillaria multiscapidea Kellogg

= Erythronium multiscapideum =

Sierra fawn lily

Species of flowering plant

Erythronium multiscapideum is a California species of flowering plant in the lily family which is known by the common name Sierra fawn lily.

It is endemic to California, where it grows in the foothills of the southern Cascade Range and the Sierra Nevada. Its primary range extends from Shasta County to Amador County with additional populations in Mariposa County.

== Description ==
Erythronium multiscapideum produces a bulb two to five centimeters long, sometimes with associated bulblets. It has two oval-shaped leaves up to 15 centimeters long which are green and mottled with brown or white. Stalks about 10 to 20 centimeters tall hold one to four flowers each. The flower has white tepals with bright yellow bases. The stamens, anthers, and stigma are white or cream.
