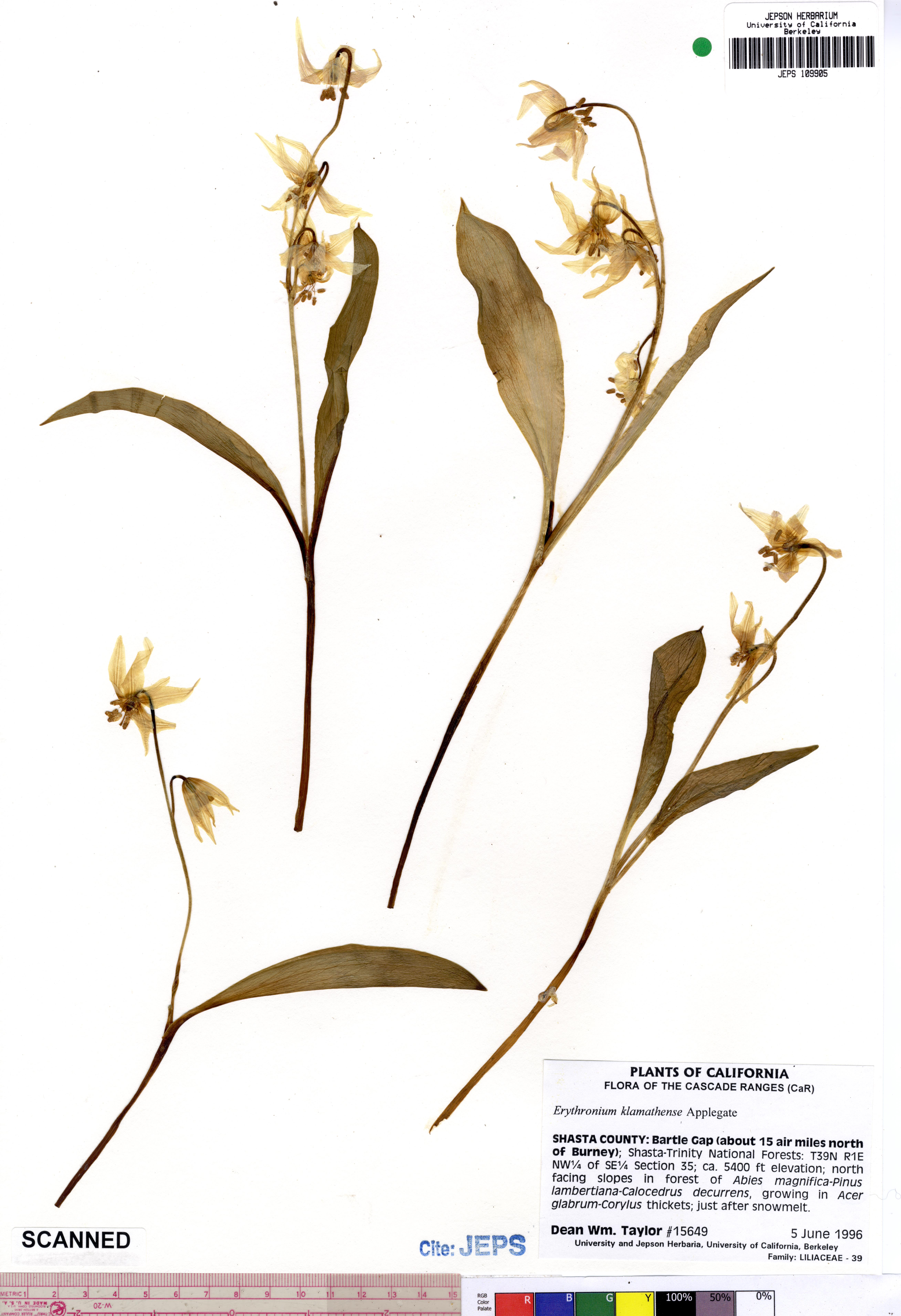

Conservation status
- Apparently Secure (NatureServe)

Scientific classification
- Kingdom: Plantae
- Clade: Tracheophytes
- Clade: Angiosperms
- Clade: Monocots
- Order: Liliales
- Family: Liliaceae
- Subfamily: Lilioideae
- Tribe: Lilieae
- Genus: Erythronium
- Species: E. klamathense

Binomial name
- Erythronium klamathense Applegate

= Erythronium klamathense =

Klamath fawn lily

Species of flowering plant

Erythronium klamathense is a rare species of flowering plant in the lily family known by the common name Klamath fawn lily. It is native to northern California (Shasta and Siskiyou Counties) and southern Oregon (Jackson, Josephine, Klamath, Douglas and Lane Counties), where it grows in the Klamath Mountains and the southernmost peaks of the Cascade Range.

== Description ==
Erythronium klamathense is a perennial herb growing from a bulb and producing generally two wavy-edged, narrow leaves up to 17 centimeters long. The inflorescence arises on an erect stalk up to 20 centimeters tall, with one to three flowers per stalk. The flower has tepals 2 or 3 centimeters long which are white with yellow bases, turning pinkish with age. The long, protruding stamens have large pale yellow anthers.
