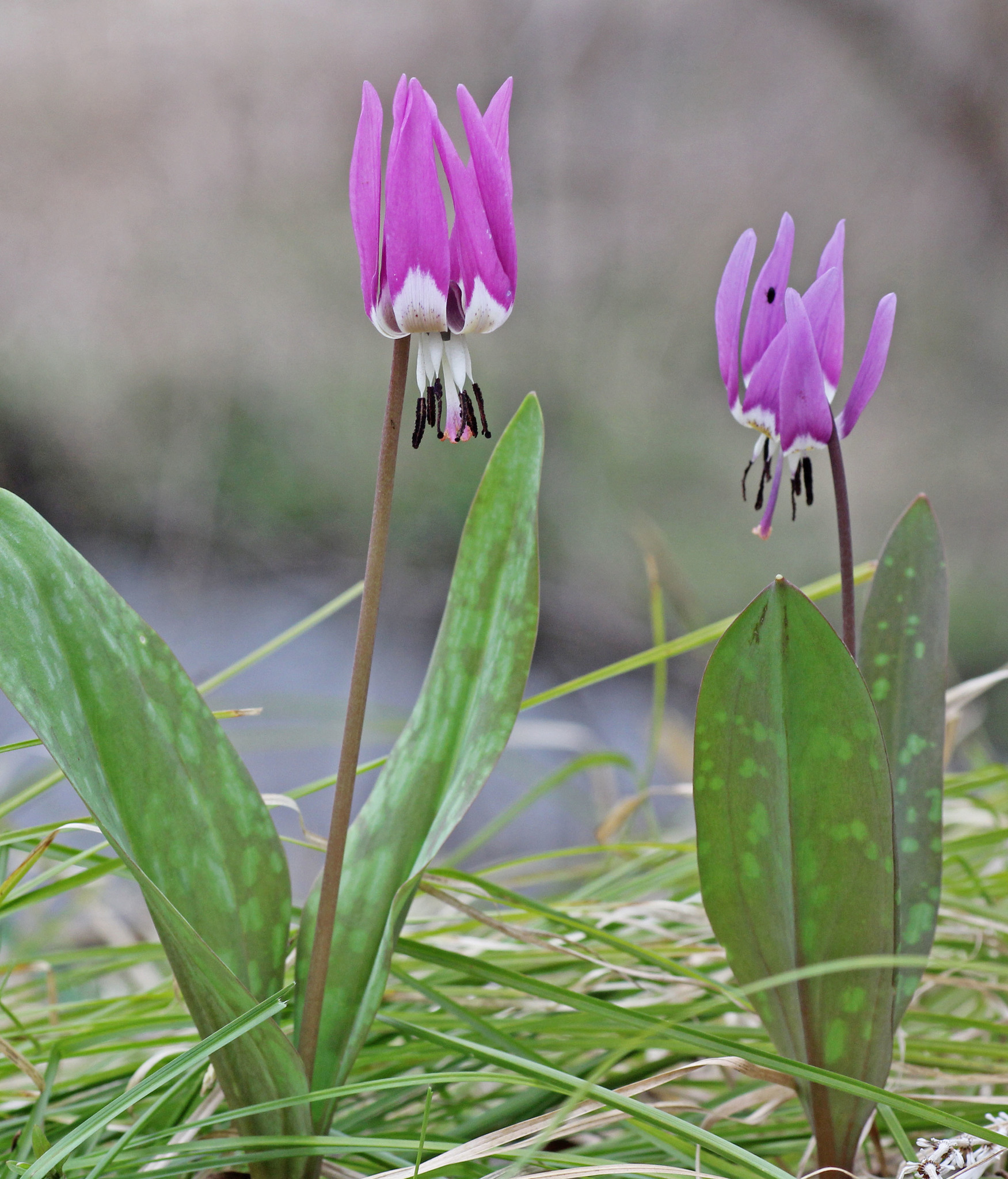

Scientific classification
- Kingdom: Plantae
- Clade: Tracheophytes
- Clade: Angiosperms
- Clade: Monocots
- Order: Liliales
- Family: Liliaceae
- Subfamily: Lilioideae
- Tribe: Lilieae
- Genus: Erythronium
- Species: E. sulevii

Binomial name
- Erythronium sulevii (Rukšans) Stepanov

= Erythronium sulevii =

Species of flowering plant

Erythronium sulevii is a plant species endemic to the Altay region of Siberia.
