= Erythronium idahoense =

Idaho fawn lily

Scientific classification
- Kingdom: Plantae
- Clade: Tracheophytes
- Clade: Angiosperms
- Clade: Monocots
- Order: Liliales
- Family: Liliaceae
- Subfamily: Lilioideae
- Tribe: Lilieae
- Genus: Erythronium
- Species: E. idahoense

Binomial name
- Erythronium idahoense H.St.John & G.N.Jones

Synonyms
- Synonymy: Erythronium grandiflorum var. idahoense (H.St.John & G.N.Jones) R.J.Davis; Erythronium grandiflorum var. albiflorum Hook.; Erythronium grandiflorum subsp. candidum Piper; Erythronium grandiflorum var. candidum (Piper) Abrams; Erythronium idahoense f. tricolor H.St.John

Species of flowering plant

Erythronium idahoense, commonly known as Idaho fawn lily, is a white-flowered plant in the Lily family native to the northwestern United States (Washington, Idaho, and Montana). Its habitats include grasslands and forest openings.

This taxon was listed as Erythronium grandiflorum subsp. candidum in Flora of North America.
