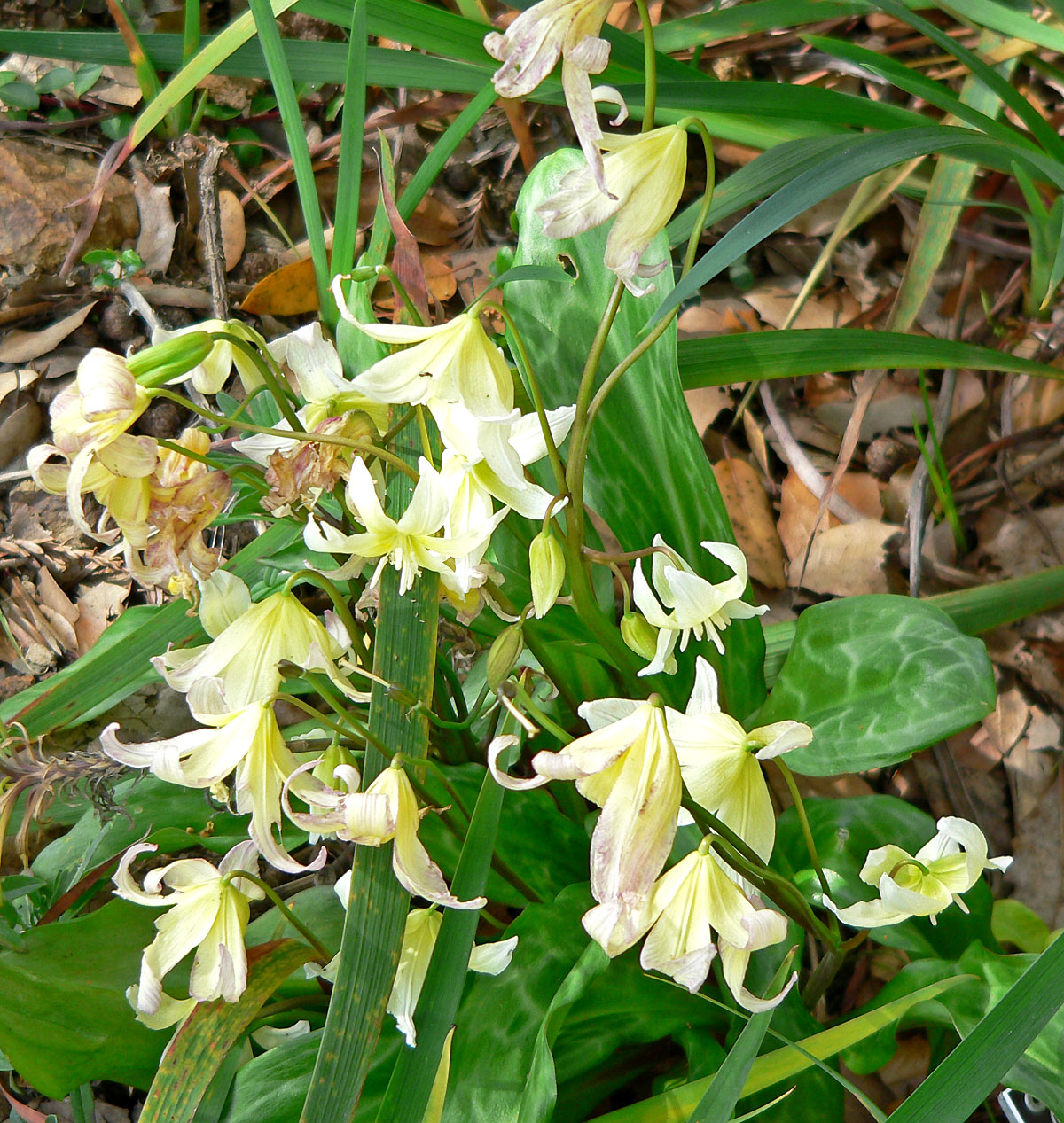

Conservation status
- Apparently Secure (NatureServe)

Scientific classification
- Kingdom: Plantae
- Clade: Tracheophytes
- Clade: Angiosperms
- Clade: Monocots
- Order: Liliales
- Family: Liliaceae
- Subfamily: Lilioideae
- Genus: Erythronium
- Species: E. californicum

Binomial name
- Erythronium californicum Purdy

= Erythronium californicum =

Species of flowering plant

Erythronium californicum, the California fawn lily, is a species of flowering plant in the family Liliaceae, endemic to moist woodland habitats in the mountains of Northern California.

== Description ==
It is an herbaceous hardy perennial growing from a pointed bulb 3 to 6 cm wide and producing two basal leaves which are sometimes spotted with brown. The reddish-green stalks grow up to 30 cm (12 in) tall and each bears one to three nodding, slightly scented flowers in spring. The flower has yellowish-white tepals 2 to 4 cm long, sometimes with red or brown banding or striping toward the bases. The stamens, anthers, and stigma are whitish in color.

The cultivars 'Brocklamont Inheritance' and 'White Beauty' have gained the Royal Horticultural Society's Award of Garden Merit.
