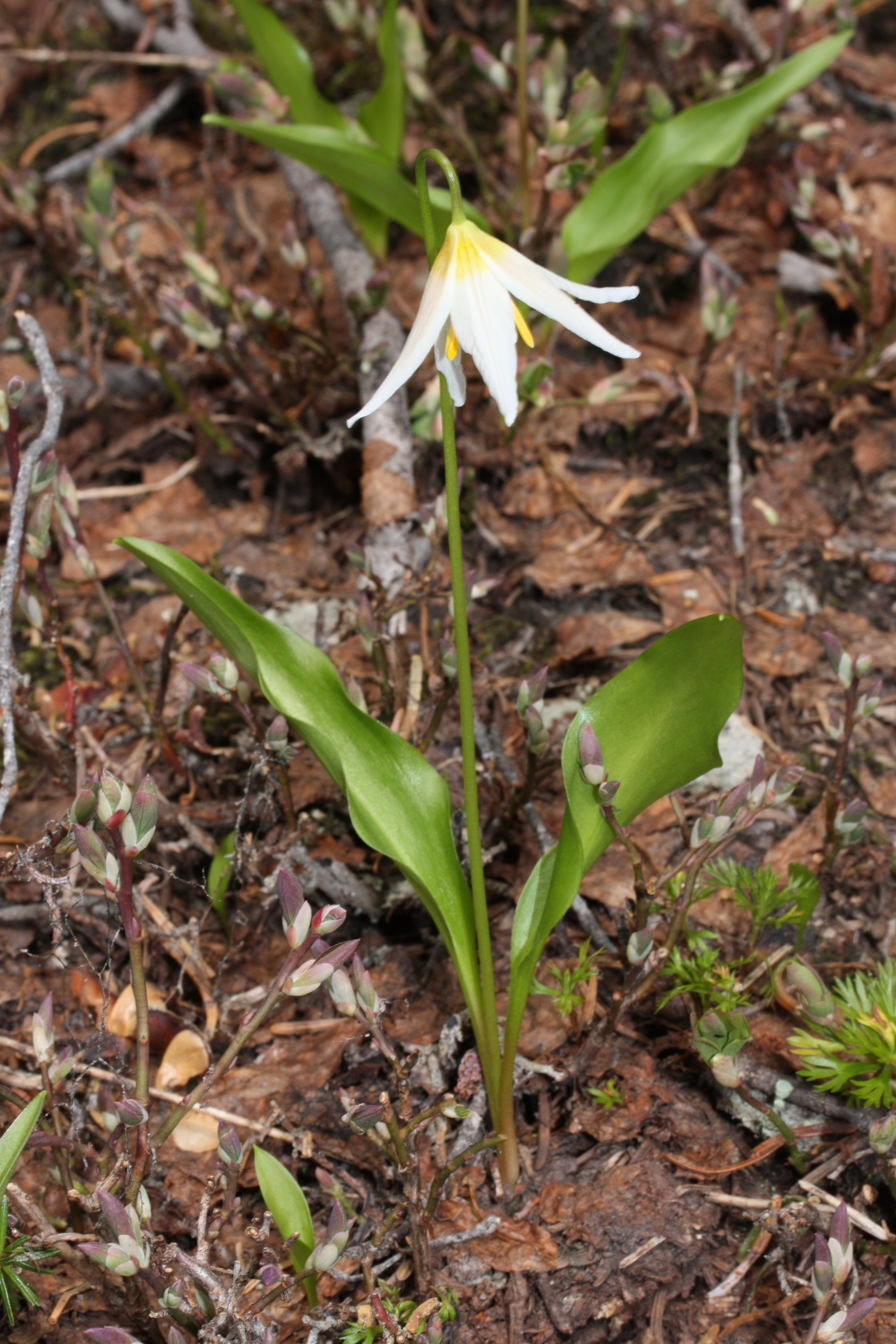
- Erythronium montanum in Olympic National Park

Scientific classification
- Kingdom: Plantae
- Clade: Tracheophytes
- Clade: Angiosperms
- Clade: Monocots
- Order: Liliales
- Family: Liliaceae
- Subfamily: Lilioideae
- Tribe: Lilieae
- Genus: Erythronium
- Species: E. montanum

Binomial name
- Erythronium montanum S.Wats.

= Erythronium montanum =

White avalanche lily

Species of flowering plant

Erythronium montanum, the avalanche lily or white avalanche lily, is a member of the lily family native to coastal British Columbia and the alpine and subalpine Olympic and Cascade Ranges of the Pacific Northwest of Washington and Oregon.

Erythronium montanum flowers shortly after the snow melts in late spring, in damp subalpine woodlands and alpine meadows, often in extensive patches. Blooming plants may persist into midsummer about the edges of snowfields. In the central Cascades, it is often found flowering admixed with Clintonia uniflora and Trillium ovatum at the lower elevation end of its range, and with Pulsatilla occidentalis(syn. Anemone occidentalis) at higher elevations. Distinguishing characteristics of this species are the oblong-lanceolate unmottled leaves and tepals that are white with a yellow base. Except for flower color, it is similar to Erythronium grandiflorum, which has a range that includes that of E. montanum.
