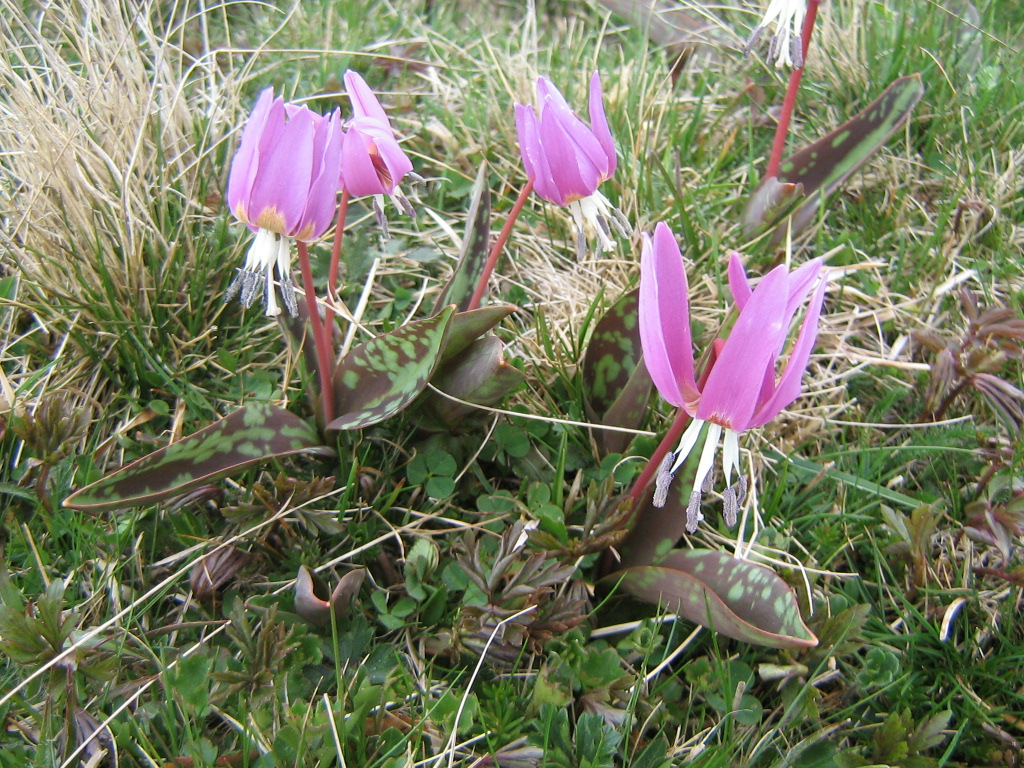
- Erythronium dens-canis

Scientific classification
- Kingdom: Plantae
- Clade: Tracheophytes
- Clade: Angiosperms
- Clade: Monocots
- Order: Liliales
- Family: Liliaceae
- Subfamily: Lilioideae
- Tribe: Lilieae
- Genus: Erythronium; L.

Type species
- Erythronium dens-canis L.

Synonyms
- Mithridatium Adans. 1763, illegitimate superfluous name; Dens-canis Tourn. ex Rupp. 1745, not validly published

= Erythronium =

Genus of flowering plants

Erythronium, the fawn lily, trout lily, dog's-tooth-violet or adder's tongue, is a genus of Eurasian and North American plants in the lily family, most closely related to tulips. The name Erythronium derives from Ancient Greek ἐρυθρός (eruthrós) "red" in Greek, referring to the red flowers of E. dens-canis. Of all the established species, most live in North America; only seven species are found in Europe and Asia.

== Taxonomy ==
It was published by Carl Linnaeus in 1753 with Erythronium dens-canis L. as the type species.

=== Species ===
Erythronium currently includes 33 accepted species of hardy spring-flowering perennial plants with long, tooth-like bulbs. The leaves are broad lanceolate, plain green in some species, but marbled with brownish-purple in many species, or pale whitish-green in some. The slender flowering stems carry one to ten pendent flowers with six recurved tepals in shades of cream, yellow, pink or mauve. The fruit is a small capsule containing a few seeds. Species are native to forests and meadows in temperate regions of the Northern Hemisphere.

Image	Species	Common name	Distribution
	Erythronium albidum Nutt.	small white fawn-lily, white fawn-lily, white trout-lily, tooth-lily	Ontario, east-central United States (Minnesota to Connecticut south to Texas and Alabama)
	Erythronium americanum Ker-Gawl.	trout-lily, yellow trout-lily, yellow adder's-tongue, yellow dogtooth violet	Eastern Canada (Ontario to Labrador), Eastern United States (Maine to Georgia, west to the Mississippi River)
	Erythronium californicum Purdy	California fawn-lily	Northern California
	Erythronium caucasicum Woronow	Caucasian dog's-tooth-violet	Caucasus, Iran
	Erythronium citrinum S. Wats.	cream fawn-lily	Oregon, Northern California
	Erythronium dens-canis L.	dog's-tooth-violet	Southern and central Europe from Portugal to Ukraine
	Erythronium elegans Hammond & Chambers	Coast Range fawn-lily	Oregon
	Erythronium grandiflorum Pursh	dogtooth lily, glacier lily, yellow avalanche-lily, yellow fawn-lily	western Canada, western United States
	Erythronium helenae Applegate	Pacific fawn-lily	California (Sonoma, Napa, Lake Cos.)
	Erythronium hendersonii S. Wats.	Henderson's fawn-lily	Oregon, Northern California
	Erythronium howellii S. Wats.	Howell's fawn-lily	Oregon, Northern California
	Erythronium idahoense H.St.John & G.N.Jones -	Idaho fawn-lily	Montana, Idaho, Washington state
	Erythronium japonicum Decne.	katakuri	Japan, Korea, Russia (Kuril Islands, Sakhalin), northeastern China (Jilin, Liaoning)
	Erythronium klamathense Applegate	Klamath fawn-lily	Oregon, Northern California
	Erythronium krylovii Stepanov	Tuvan trout-lily	Russia (Tuva, Krasnoyarsk)
	Erythronium mesochoreum Knerr	midland fawn-lily, white fawn-lily	Central United States (TX to NE, IN)
	Erythronium montanum S. Wats.	avalanche lily, white avalanche-lily	BC, Washington state, Oregon
	Erythronium multiscapideum (Kellogg) A. Nels. & Kennedy	Sierra fawn-lily	California
	Erythronium oregonum Applegate	giant white fawn-lily	BC, Washington, California, Oregon
	Erythronium pluriflorum Shevock, Bartel & G.A.Allen	manyflower fawn-lily	Madera Co in California
	Erythronium propullans Gray	dwarf trout-lily	Minnesota
	Erythronium purpurascens S. Wats.	purple fawn-lily	California
	Erythronium pusaterii (Munz & J.T. Howell) Shevock, Bartel & G.A.Allen	Kaweah Lakes fawn-lily	Tulare Co in California
	Erythronium quinaultense G.A.Allen	Olympic fawn-lily	Olympic Peninsula in Washington state
	Erythronium revolutum Sm.	mahogany fawn-lily	BC, Washington state, Oregon, California
	Erythronium rostratum W.Wolf	yellow trout-lily	south-central United States
	Erythronium sajanense Stepanov & Stassova		Krasnoyarsk in Russia
	Erythronium shastense D.A.York, J.K.Nelson & D.W.Taylor	Shasta fawn lily	Northern California
	Erythronium sibiricum (Fisch. & C.A.Mey.) Krylov	Siberian fawn-lily	Siberia, Kazakhstan, Xinjiang, Mongolia
	Erythronium sulevii (Rukšans) Stepanov		Altay Krai in Russia
	Erythronium taylorii Shevock & G.A.Allen	Taylor's fawn-lily	Tuolumne Co California
	Erythronium tuolumnense Applegate	Tuolumne fawn-lily	Tuolumne Co in California
	Erythronium umbilicatum Parks & Hardin	dimpled trout-lily	southeastern United States (Florida to Kentucky, West Virginia, Maryland)

=== Formerly included ===
Two species names were coined using the name Erythronium which have since been reclassified to other taxa.

- Erythronium carolinianum, now called Uvularia perfoliata
- Erythronium hyacinthoides, now called Drimia indica

== Cultivation and uses ==
Erythroniums are woodland plants and require rich soil, full of organic matter. Soil should be evenly moist and slightly acidic. They prefer shade or filtered sunlight.

Erythroniums are widely grown as ornamental plants, with numerous hybrids and cultivars having been selected for garden use. Popular cultivars include Erythronium 'Pagoda', E. 'Sundisc', E. 'Joanna', E. 'Kondo', E. 'Citronella', E. californicum 'White Beauty', and E. 'Rosalind'. Propagation is best by seed in autumn or by division of bulbs, depending on species. Some species propagate vegetatively. The plant is also used as a ground cover; it will spread over several years.

The following cultivars, of mixed ancestry, have won the Royal Horticultural Society's Award of Garden Merit:

- 'Apple Blossom' (white with yellow centre)
- 'Janice' (pink)
- 'Joanna' (cream/pale yellow throat)
- 'Pagoda' (cream yellow)
- 'Sundisc' (yellow)
- 'Wildside Seedling' (white/yellow)

The bulb is edible as a root vegetable, cooked or dried, and can be ground into flour. The leaves can also be cooked as a leaf vegetable. In Japan, Erythronium japonicum is called katakuri, and the bulb is processed to produce starch, which is used for food and other purposes.

== See also ==
- List of plants known as lily

== Bibliography ==
- "Erythronium 'Pagoda'". Royal Horrticultural Society. Archived from the original on 27 February 2014.
- Clennett, John C. B.; Chase, Mark W.; Forest, Félix; Maurin, Olivier; Wilkin, Paul (December 2012). "Phylogenetic systematics of Erythronium (Liliaceae): morphological and molecular analyses". Botanical Journal of the Linnean Society. 170 (4): 504–528. doi:10.1111/j.1095-8339.2012.01302.x.
