= Elmer Ivan Applegate =

American botanist

- Born: March 31, 1867; Ashland, Oregon, US
- Died: November 16, 1949 (aged 82); Williams, Oregon, US
- Education: Stanford University
- Spouse: Esther Emily Ogden (1899)
- Awards: Honorary degree from Oregon State University
- Scientific career
- Fields: Botany
- Institutions: US Department of Agriculture; Stanford University; National Park Service
- Author abbrev. (zoology): Applegate

Elmer Ivan Applegate (March 31, 1867 – November 16, 1949) was an American botanist. The standard author abbreviation Applegate is used to indicate this person as the author when citing a botanical name.

== Biography ==
Elmer Applegate was born in Ashland, Oregon, on March 31, 1867. He started to take botany seriously in 1894, when he started to attend San Jose Normal School, and later, in Stanford University, in 1895. Between 1896 and 1898, he spent 5 months a year, under supervision of Frederick Coville of the US Department of Agriculture, where he did plant surveys in the Cascade Mountains, that can range from Klamath Falls to Portland. During the winter of last year, his job was to organize a plant collections, in Washington, D.C.

Between 1928 and 1938 he was appointed as an honorary acting director of the Dudley Herbarium, at Stanford University. When he turned 67, he started serving at National Park Service as a ranger-naturalist, in Crater Lake National Park. That career he was doing from 1934 to 1939. In 1940, he was awarded an honorary Doctor of Science degree from Oregon State College. He wrote a monograph of Erythronium, from a lily family, a wrote numerous books about flora of the park and Lava Beds National Monument. During his career, he wrote 12 botanical names for plant species.

He married Esther Emily Ogden, in San Bernardino, California, in 1899. She was a niece of Peter Skene Ogden, a Hudson's Bay Company explorer. She was very watercolorist, and painter. She also accompanied her husband on field trips. They both lived in Klamath Falls until his wife died in 1931. He died on November 16, 1949, in Williams, Oregon, at the age of 82.

== Honors ==
Four plant species were named in Applegate's honor, including Astragalus applegatei (Applegate's milkvetch) and Castilleja applegatei (wavyleaf Indian paintbrush).
