= Geraldine A. Allen =

Canadian botanist (born 1950)

Geraldine Anne Allen
- Born: 1950 (age 75–76)
- Other name: Geraldine Anne Allen Guppy
- Education: Oregon State University (PhD 1981); University of British Columbia (BSc 1972, MSc 1975)
- Spouse: Arthur Guppy (div.)
- Scientific career
- Fields: Plant evolution; Phylogeny and phylogeography of plants; Conservation genetics
- Institutions: University of Victoria
- Theses: Biosystematics of a Western North American Polyploid Complex in the Genus Aster (1980); The Systematics of Indigenous Species of Hieracium Asteraceae in British Columbia (1974)
- Doctoral advisor: Kenton L. Chambers
- Other academic advisors: Roy L. Taylor
- Author abbrev. (botany): G.A.Allen

Geraldine Anne Allen (born 1950) is a botanist, professor of biology, and herbarium curator at the University of Victoria in British Columbia, Canada. She obtained formal education at the University of British Columbia and Oregon State University, earning a Doctor of Philosophy degree in botany and plant pathology from the latter in 1981. During her career, she has authored or co-authored over 50 publications, including genera chapters for Flora of North America and the Jepson Manual. She also has authored several species of the Erythronium genus.

== Education ==
Allen earned Bachelor of Science and Master of Science degrees from the University of British Columbia in 1972 and 1975, respectively, and a Doctor of Philosophy degree in botany and plant pathology from Oregon State University in 1981. Her master's thesis was entitled The Systematics of Indigenous Species of Hieracium Asteraceae in British Columbia and her dissertation was Biosystematics of a Western North American Polyploid Complex in the Genus Aster.

== Career ==
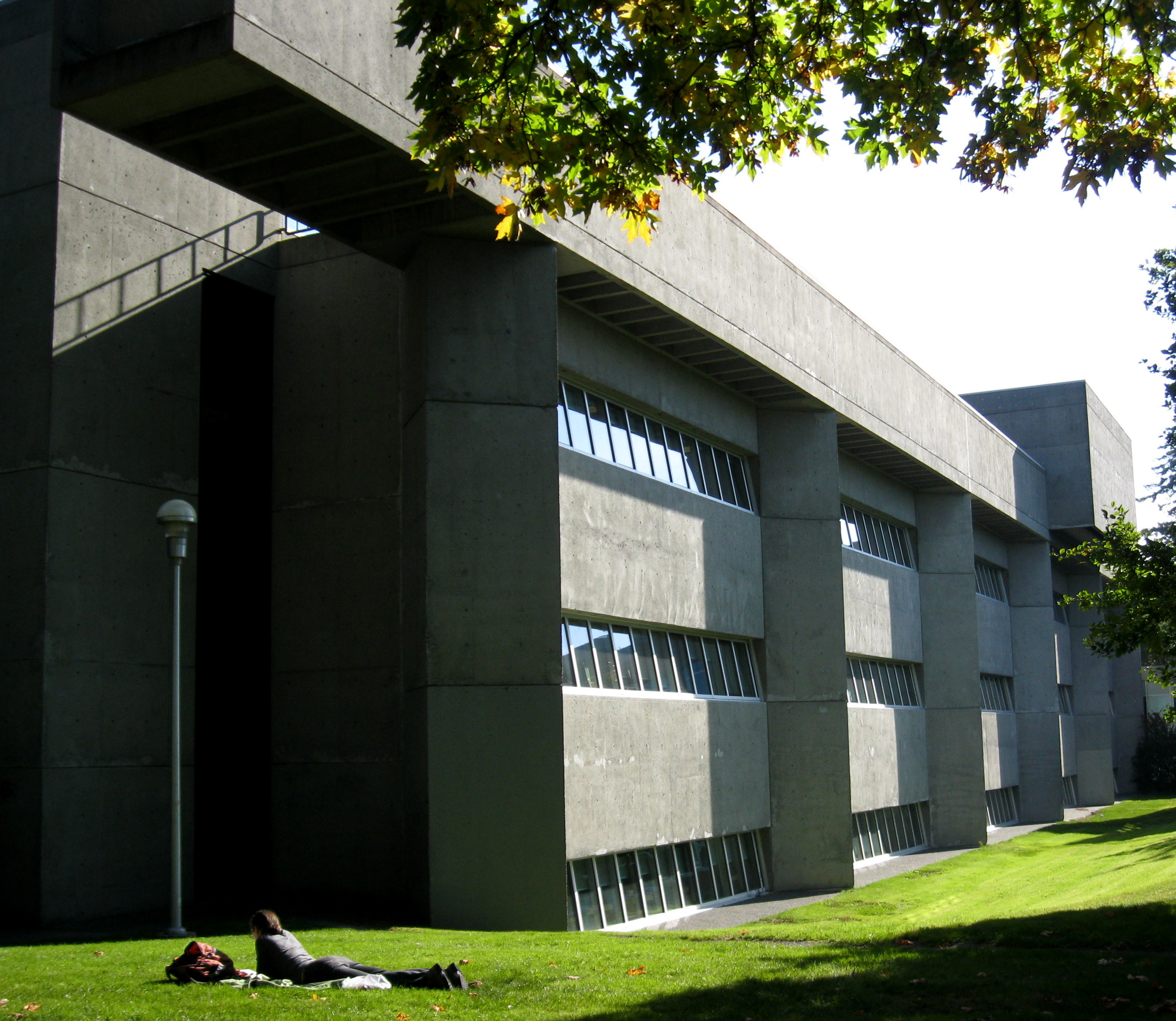
Cunningham biology building, University of Victoria

Allen is professor of biology and herbarium curator at the University of Victoria in British Columbia, Canada. During her career, she has authored or co-authored over 50 publications, including the Flora of North America chapters on the genera Erythronium, Eucephalus, and Symphyotrichum. Her work also has included chapters for the Jepson Manual on genera Symphyotrichum, Erythronium, and Doellingeria. Allen has authored several species of the Erythronium genus. The standard author abbreviation G.A.Allen is used to indicate this person as the author when citing a botanical name.

== Personal life ==
While Allen was writing her master's thesis, she was married to Arthur Guppy, and she used variations of the name Geraldine Anne Allen Guppy as author for her thesis, her dissertation, and her other 1970s publications.

== Selected publications ==
- Allen, G.A. (2006). "Eucephalus Nuttall". In Flora North America Editorial Committee (ed.). Flora of North America. Vol. 20. New York: Oxford University Press. pp. 39–42.
- Allen, G.A.; Robertson, K.R. (2006). "Erythronium Linnaeus". In Flora North America Editorial Committee (ed.). Flora of North America. Vol. 26. New York: Oxford University Press. pp. 153–163.
- Allen, G.A. (2012). Jepson Flora Project (ed.). "Symphyotrichum [and subordinate taxa]". Jepson eFlora.
- Allen, G.A.; Wetherwax, M. (2018). Jepson Flora Project (ed.). "Erythronium [and subordinate taxa]". Jepson eFlora, Revision 6.
- Allen, G.A. (2020). Jepson Flora Project (ed.). "Doellingeria [and subordinate taxa]". Jepson eFlora, Revision 8.
- Brouillet, L.; Semple, J.C.; Allen, G.A.; Chambers, K.L.; Sundberg, S.D. (2006). "Symphyotrichum Nees [and subordinate taxa]". In Flora North America Editorial Committee (ed.). Flora of North America. Vol. 20. New York: Oxford University Press. pp. 465–539.
- Guppy, G.A.A. (31 December 1974). The Systematics of Indigenous Species of Hieracium Asteraceae in British Columbia (MSc thesis). Vancouver: University of British Columbia. doi:10.14288/1.0093399. Archived from the original on 13 October 2021.
- Guppy, G.A.; Bohm, B.A. (1976). "Flavonoids of Five Hieracium Species of British Columbia". Biochemical Systematics and Ecology. 4 (4). Elsevier: 231–234. doi:10.1016/0305-1978(76)90044-2. ISSN 0305-1978.
- Guppy, G.A. (December 1978). "Species Relationships of Hieracium (Asteraceae) in British Columbia". Canadian Journal of Botany. 56 (23). Ottawa: Canadian Science Publishing: 3008–3019. doi:10.1139/b78-365. eISSN 1916-2804. ISSN 1916-2790.
- Guppy, G.A.A. (18 December 1980). Biosystematics of a Western North American Polyploid Complex in the Genus Aster (PhD dissertation). Corvallis: Oregon State University. Archived from the original on 13 October 2021.

== General references ==
- Botanical Society of America (1995). "Guide to Graduate Study in Botany for the United States and Canada". American Journal of Botany (Supplement). 170. 82 (10) (8th ed.). St. Louis, Missouri: Botanical Society of America: 4. ISSN 1537-2197.
- IPNI (2021). "Allen, Geraldine A." www.ipni.org. Royal Botanic Gardens, Kew; Harvard University Herbaria & Libraries; Australian National Botanic Gardens.
- Oregon State University (n.d.). "Graduate Thesis Or Dissertation — Guppy, Geraldine Anne Allen". ir.library.oregonstate.edu.
- POWO (2021). "Erythronium L." www.plantsoftheworldonline.org. Royal Botanic Gardens, Kew.
- ResearchGate (n.d.). "Geraldine A Allen". www.researchgate.net.
- University of Victoria (2015). "Our people: Herbarium staff". www.uvic.ca. Archived from the original on 13 October 2021.
- University of Victoria (2021). "Dr. Geraldine Allen". www.uvic.ca. Archived from the original on 6 October 2021.
