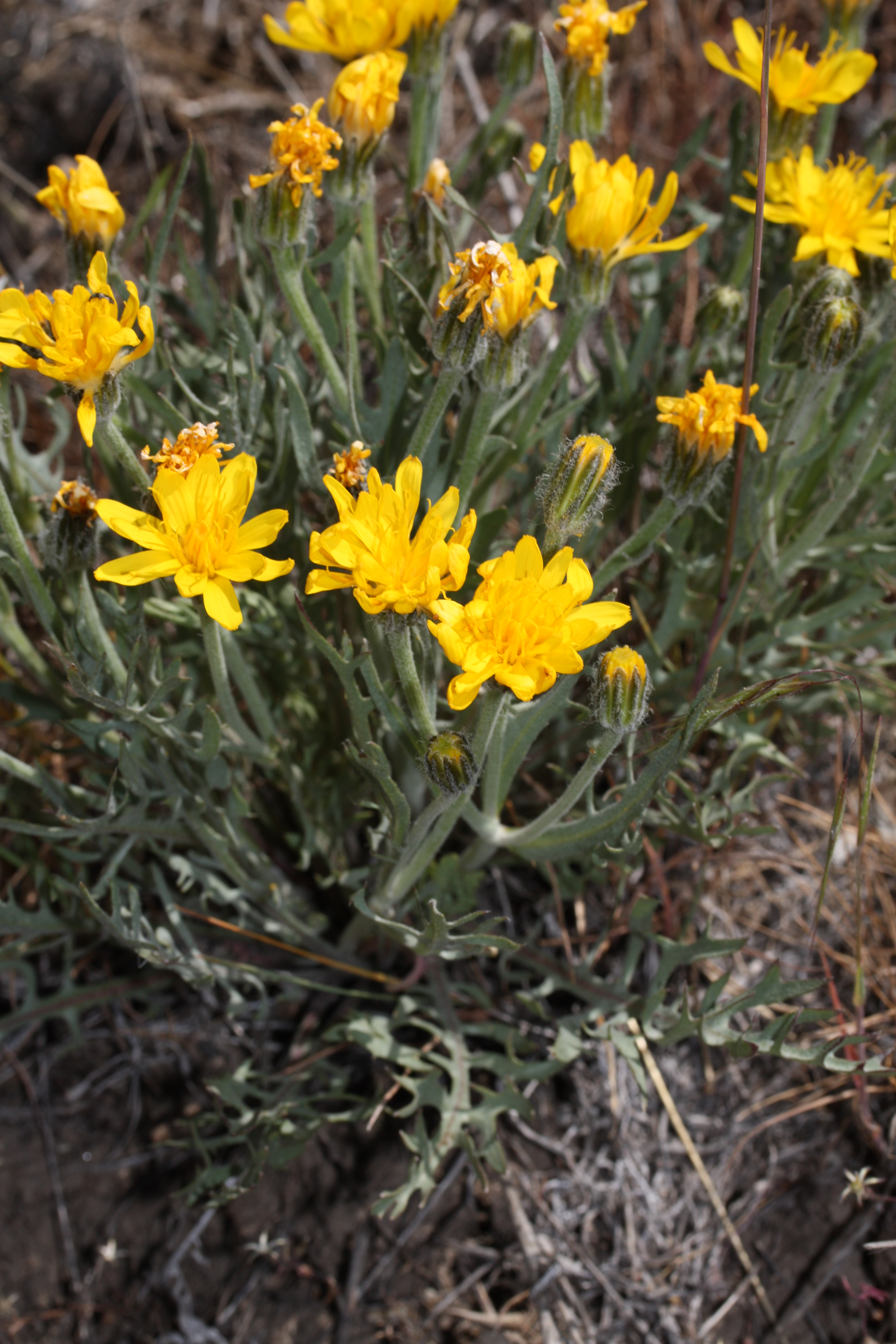
- Crepis modocensis in Wenas Wildlife Area

Conservation status
- Apparently Secure (NatureServe)

Scientific classification
- Kingdom: Plantae
- Clade: Tracheophytes
- Clade: Angiosperms
- Clade: Eudicots
- Clade: Asterids
- Order: Asterales
- Family: Asteraceae
- Genus: Crepis
- Species: C. modocensis

Binomial name
- Crepis modocensis E. Greene

Synonyms
- Crepis scopulorum Coville; Psilochenia modocensis (Greene) W.A.Weber; Crepis glareosa Piper, syn of subsp. glareosa; Crepis rostrata Coville, syn of subsp. rostrata; Crepis subacaulis (Kellogg) Coville, syn of subsp. rostrata

= Crepis modocensis =

Species of flowering plant

Crepis modocensis is a species of flowering plant in the family Asteraceae known by the common name Modoc hawksbeard.

It is native to western North America (British Columbia, Washington, Oregon, California, Nevada, Utah, Idaho, Montana, Wyoming, Colorado), where it grows in several types of mountain and plateau habitat, including sagebrush. It typically prefers rocky soil.

The species name is from the Modoc Plateau, in the northeast California range.

== Description ==
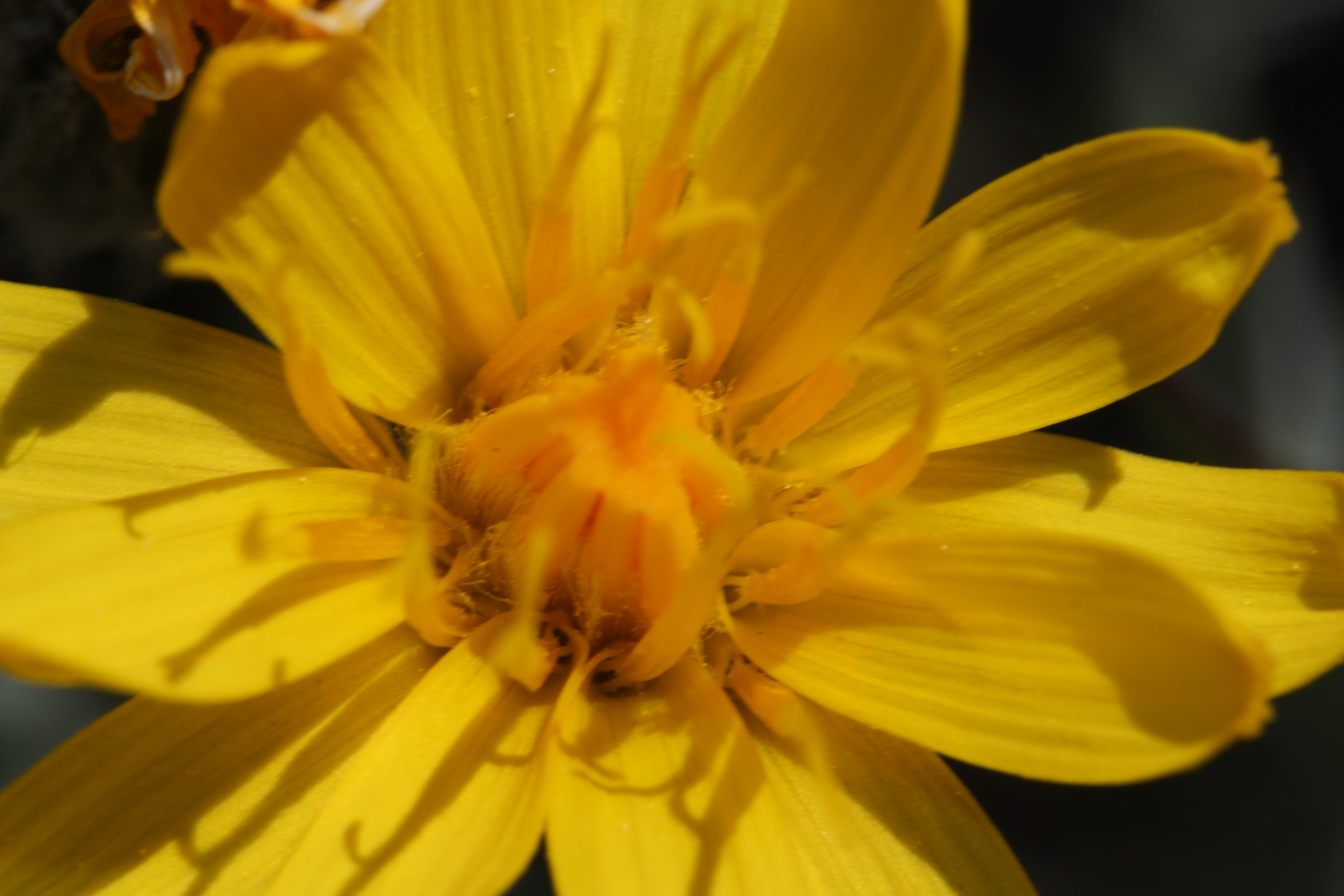
The flower heads are large with 10 to 60 ray florets.

Crepis modocensis is a perennial herb growing an erect stem up to 45 centimeters (18 inches) tall and often lined with long bristles. The woolly and sometimes bristly leaves are dark-veined and edged with blunt and sharp lobes. The longest leaves at the base of the plant reach about 25 centimeters (10 inches) long.

The inflorescence bears one to ten flower heads about 5 cm (2 in) in diameter with rough or bristly phyllaries and up to 60 yellow ray florets but no disc florets.

The fruit is an achene around a centimeter long which is black, sometimes green or red tinted, and sports a tufty white pappus.

Subspecies

- Crepis modocensis subsp. glareosa (Piper) Babc. & Stebbins – Kittitas County in Washington
- Crepis modocensis subsp. modocensis – most of species range
- Crepis modocensis subsp. rostrata (Coville) Babc. & Stebbins – British Columbia, Washington
- Crepis modocensis subsp. subacaulis (Kellogg) Babc. & Stebbins – California, Montana, Nevada, Oregon

C. modocensis may have hybridized with Crepis atribarba to produce Crepis barbigera, the head size of which is intermediate between its prospective parent species.
