= Hyoseris hirta =

Hyoseris hirta may refer to two different species of plants:

- Hyoseris hirta (L.) Gaertn., a synonym for Leontodon saxatilis Lam.
- Hyoseris hirta Balb. ex Willd., a synonym for Crepis bursifolia L.
