= C. bakeri =

C. bakeri may refer to:

- Ceriagrion bakeri, a species of damselfly found in Angola and the Democratic Republic of Congo
- Colletotrichum bakeri, a synonym for Colletotrichum dematium, a plant pathogen causing anthracnose
- Crepis bakeri, the Baker's hawksbeard, a species of flowering plant in the daisy family
- Ctenosaura bakeri, the Utila iguana, Baker's spinytail iguana, swamper or wishiwilly del Suampo, a spinytail iguana endemic to Honduras
- Cupressus bakeri, the Modoc cypress, Siskiyou cypress or Baker cypress, a species of cypress native to the United States

== See also ==
- Bakeri (disambiguation)
