= Aetheria =

The name Aetheria may refer to:

- Aetheria (mythology), one of the Heliades, daughters of Helios in Greek mythology
- Egeria (pilgrim), also known as Etheria, Eucheria, or Silvia, known for writing the Peregrinatio Ætheriæ, Itinerarium Egeriae, or Peregrinatio ad Loca Sancta
- A synonym for the moth genus Hecatera
- Ætheria, one of the classical albedo features on Mars
- Aetheria: first abbess of Notre-Dame de Soissons (658)
- Aetheria: A magical realm consisting of dragons, humans, and fearies.
