= Hawksbeard =

Hawksbeard is a common name for several plants and may refer to:

- Crepis, a cosmopolitan plant genus
- Youngia, an Asiatic plant genus

== Other uses ==
- Andrena fulvago, the Hawk's-Beard Mining-Bee
