= Pseudathetis =

Scientific classification
- Domain: Eukaryota
- Kingdom: Animalia
- Phylum: Arthropoda
- Class: Insecta
- Order: Lepidoptera
- Superfamily: Noctuoidea
- Family: Noctuidae
- Genus: Pseudathetis; Boursin, 1937

Genus of moths

Pseudathetis was a genus of moths of the family Noctuidae. It is now considered a synonym of Hecatera. It consisted of the species Pseudophia fixseni, which is now renamed to Hecatera fixseni.
