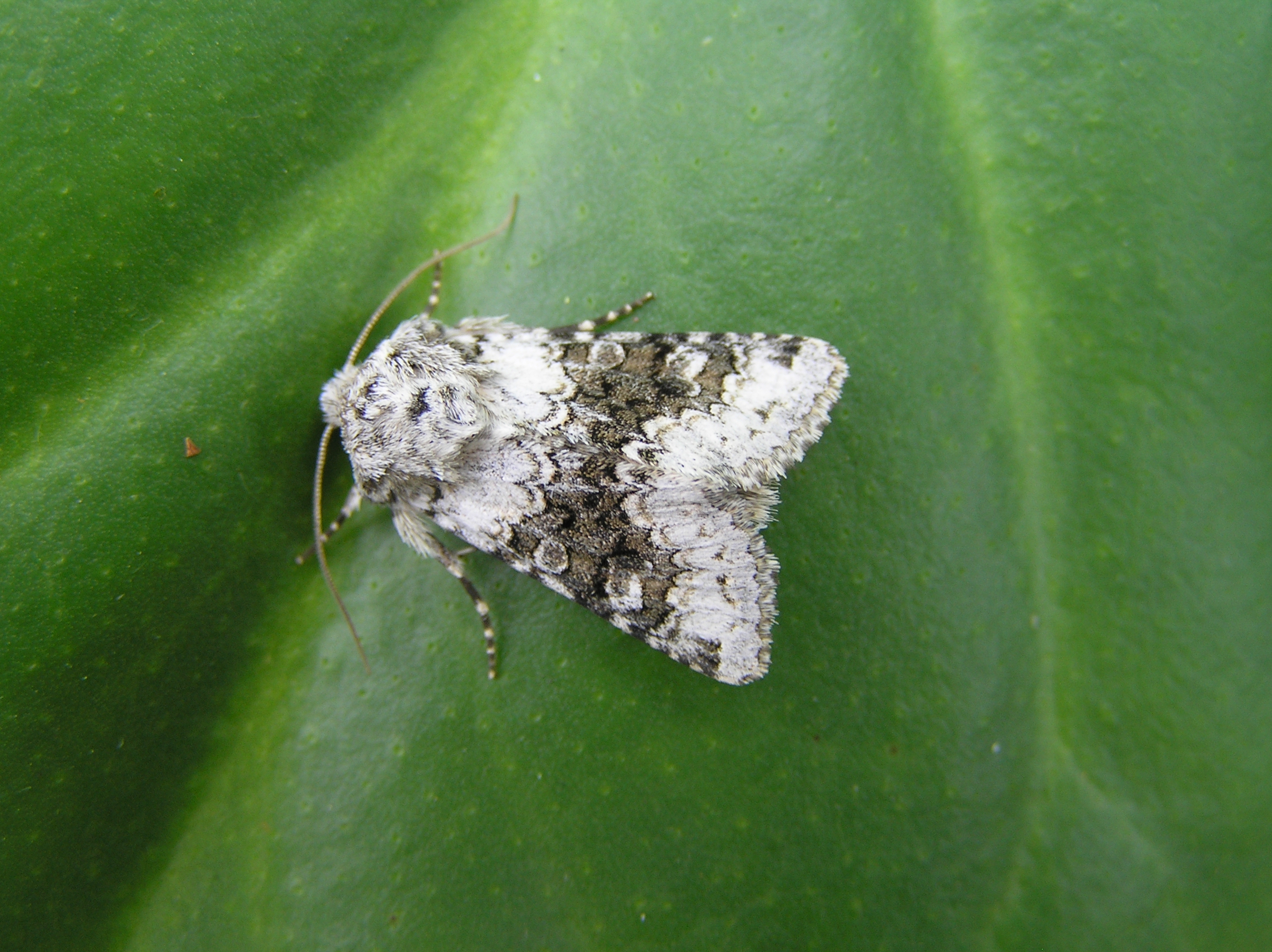

Scientific classification
- Domain: Eukaryota
- Kingdom: Animalia
- Phylum: Arthropoda
- Class: Insecta
- Order: Lepidoptera
- Superfamily: Noctuoidea
- Family: Noctuidae
- Genus: Hecatera
- Species: H. bicolorata

Binomial name
- Hecatera bicolorata (Hufnagel, 1766)

Synonyms
- Phalaena bicolorata; Aetheria bicolorata; Noctua serena; Noctua hieracii; Polia leuconota; Phalaena par; Hecatera intermedia; Noctua monticola; Mamestra serena var. obscura

= Broad-barred white =

Species of moth

The broad-barred white (Hecatera bicolorata) is a moth of the family Noctuidae. The species was first described by Johann Siegfried Hufnagel in 1766. It is distributed throughout Europe and is also found in Turkey, Iran, Israel, Lebanon, Syria, Kirghizia, Tajikistan, western Siberia and China.

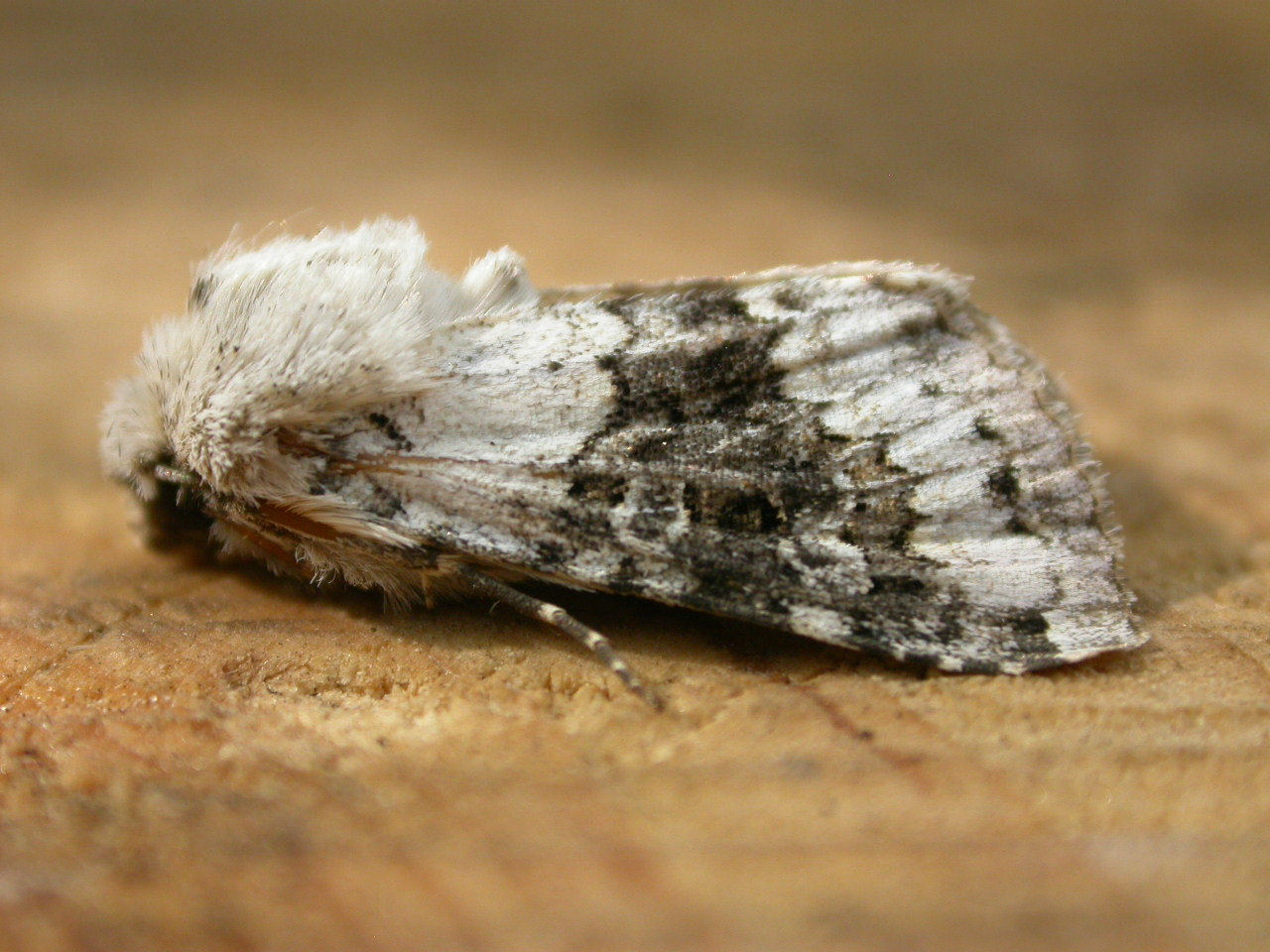

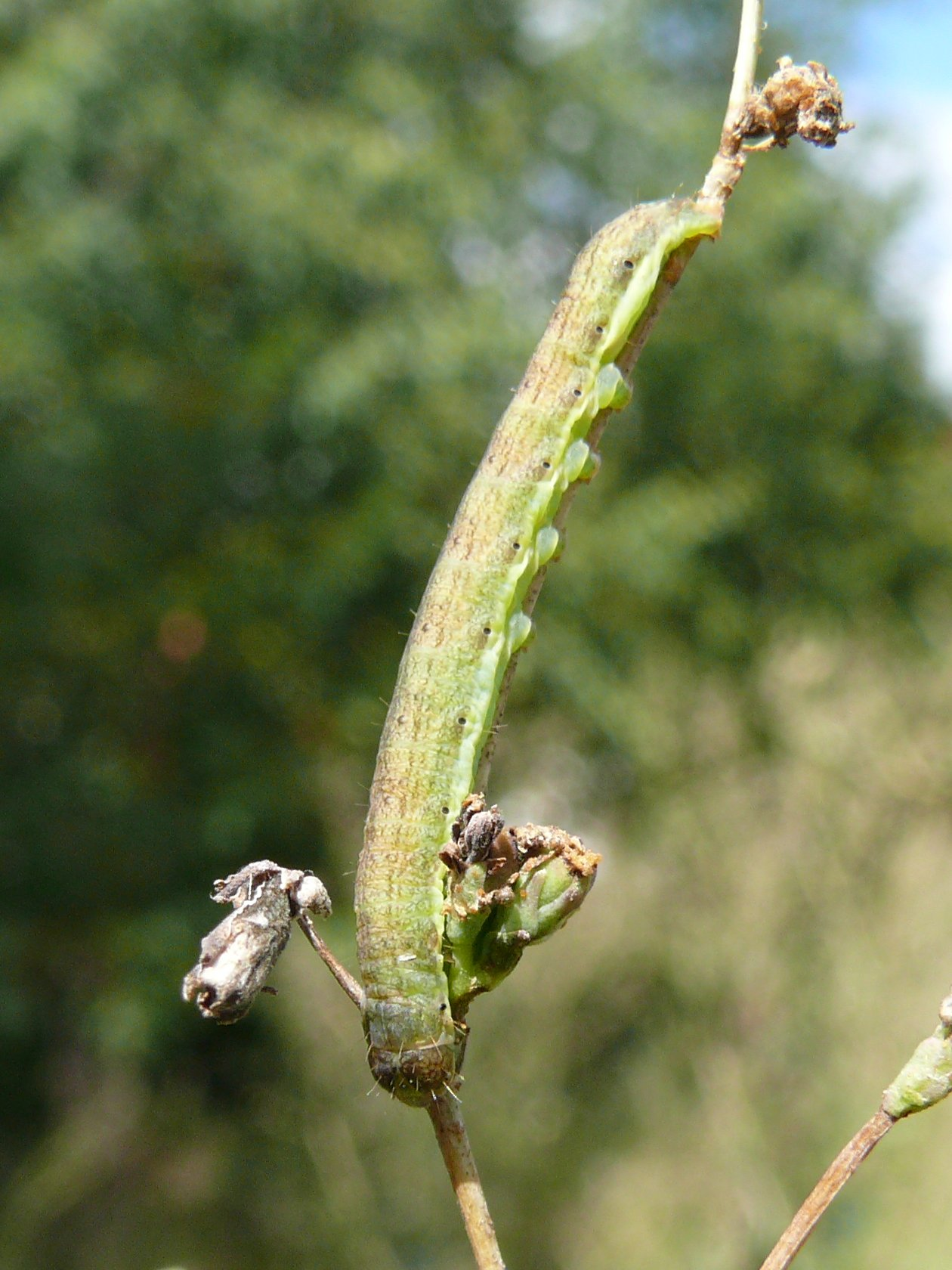

== Description ==
This is a fairly small (wingspan 28–35 mm) distinctive species. The white or sometimes bluish-grey forewings are marked with a broad dark olive-fuscous median band. The claviform stigma is black edged; upper stigmata are pale grey with dark centres. The base and outer area of forewing and the head and thorax are pure white. The hindwings are whitish grey with veins and marginal border fuscous. The hindwings are darker in the female.

== Technical description ==
P. serena Schiff. (= placida Esp., hieracii Scriba, bicolorata Led., intermedia Walk. (17 f)). Forewing bluish grey, the median area dark olive fuscous; claviform stigma black-edged; upper stigmata pale grey with dark centres; hindwing whitish grey, — in female darker, — with veins and marginal border fuscous; — in leuconota Ev. (? = monticola Dup.) (17f) the base and outer area of forewing and the head and thorax are pure white; this form occurs in S. E. Russia, and is the prevalent form in Britain; the pale specimens with the marginal area well-marked are differentiated by Spuler as ab. leucomelaena, while albicans Spuler. applies to the rare cases in which the central field as well is broken up by white: — obscura Stgr. (17f) represents a very uniform dark grey aberration. — Larva yellowish green or brown, with dark blotches along dorsal and subdorsal regions; spiracular line yellow, distinct; head greenish yellow; feeds on flowers of various Compositae, Hieracium, Sonchus, etc.

== Biology ==
This species flies at night from June to August (Note: The flight season refers to the British Isles. This may vary in other parts of the range.) and is attracted to light and various flowers.

The larva is brown or green with darker diamonds along the back. It feeds on the flowers and buds of various yellow-flowered Asteraceae such as hawksbeards, hawkweeds and sow thistles. The species overwinters as a pupa.
