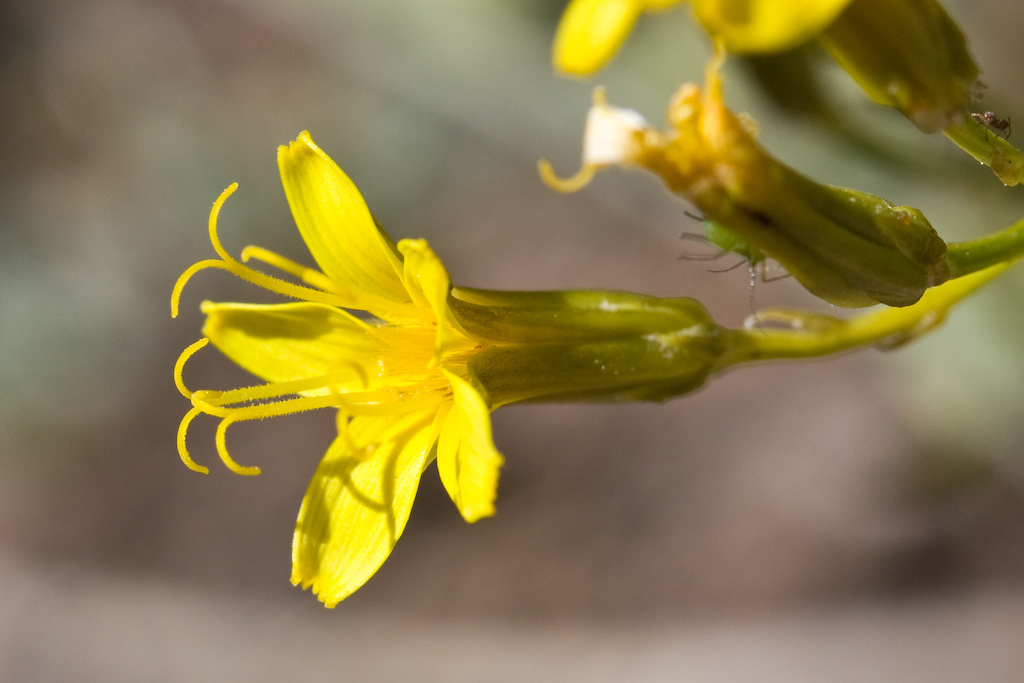

Scientific classification
- Kingdom: Plantae
- Clade: Embryophytes
- Clade: Tracheophytes
- Clade: Spermatophytes
- Clade: Angiosperms
- Clade: Eudicots
- Clade: Asterids
- Order: Asterales
- Family: Asteraceae
- Genus: Crepis
- Species: C. pleurocarpa

Binomial name
- Crepis pleurocarpa A.Gray

Synonyms
- Psilochenia pleurocarpa (A.Gray) W.A.Weber

= Crepis pleurocarpa =

Species of flowering plant

Crepis pleurocarpa is a North American species of flowering plant in the family Asteraceae known by the common name nakedstem hawksbeard. It is native to the western United States (Washington, Oregon, northern California and western Nevada).

Crepis pleurocarpa grows in dry, wooded or open habitat, sometimes on serpentine soils. It is a taprooted perennial herb producing a branching stem up to 60 cm (24 in) in height. The lance-shaped leaves are lobed and long near the base of the plant, approaching 30 cm (12 in) in length, and smaller and sometimes unlobed higher up the stem. The inflorescence is an open array of many flower heads, each having pointed phyllaries with thick midribs and thinner, hair-lined edges. Each flower head has 5 to 8 golden yellow ray florets, but no disc florets. The fruit is a narrow, ribbed achene with a whitish pappus.
