= Epipsammia =

Scientific classification
- Domain: Eukaryota
- Kingdom: Animalia
- Phylum: Arthropoda
- Class: Insecta
- Order: Lepidoptera
- Superfamily: Noctuoidea
- Family: Noctuidae
- Genus: Epipsammia; Staudinger, 1879

Genus of moths

Epipsammia was a genus of moths of the family Noctuidae. It is now considered a synonym of Hecatera. It consisted of the species Epipsammia deserticola, which has been renamed to Hecatera deserticola.
