= Sartha =

Scientific classification
- Domain: Eukaryota
- Kingdom: Animalia
- Phylum: Arthropoda
- Class: Insecta
- Order: Lepidoptera
- Superfamily: Noctuoidea
- Family: Noctuidae
- Genus: Sartha; Staudinger, 1891

Genus of moths

Sartha was a genus of moths of the family Noctuidae. It is now considered a synonym of Hecatera.
