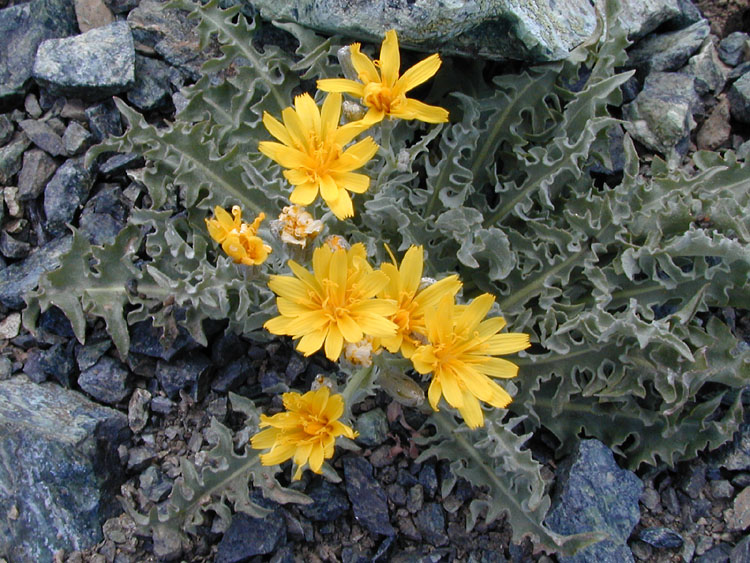

Conservation status
- Secure (NatureServe)

Scientific classification
- Kingdom: Plantae
- Clade: Tracheophytes
- Clade: Angiosperms
- Clade: Eudicots
- Clade: Asterids
- Order: Asterales
- Family: Asteraceae
- Genus: Crepis
- Species: C. occidentalis

Binomial name
- Crepis occidentalis Nutt.

Synonyms
- Berinia occidentalis (Nutt.) Sch.Bip.; Hieracioides occidentale (Nutt.) Kuntze; Psilochenia occidentalis (Nutt.) Nutt.; Crepis grandifolia Greene, syn of subsp. costata; Crepis pumila Rydb., syn of subsp. pumila

= Crepis occidentalis =

Species of flowering plant

Crepis occidentalis is a North American species of flowering plant in the family Asteraceae known by the common names western hawksbeard, or largeflower hawksbeard. It is native to western Canada (British Columbia, Alberta, Saskatchewan) and the western United States (from the Pacific to the western Great Plains).

Crepis occidentalis grows in many types of habitat. It is a perennial herb growing a grayish woolly branching stem to about 40 centimeters (16 inches) in height from a deep taproot. The woolly, toothed leaves are up to 30 centimeters (12 inches) long at the base of the plant. The inflorescence produces several clusters of flower heads with hairy, often glandular phyllaries and many yellow ray florets but no disc florets. The fruit is a ribbed achene with a frilly pappus at the tip.

Subspecies

- Crepis occidentalis subsp. conjuncta Babcock & Stebbins – California, Colorado, Montana, Oregon, Washington, Wyoming
- Crepis occidentalis subsp. costata (A.Gray) Babc. & Stebbins – British Columbia, Saskatchewan, California, Colorado, Idaho, Montana, Nevada, Oregon, Utah, Washington, Wyoming
- Crepis occidentalis subsp. occidentalis – Alberta, British Columbia, Saskatchewan, Arizona, California, Colorado, Idaho, Montana, Oregon, New Mexico, Nevada, South Dakota, Utah, Washington., Wyoming
- Crepis occidentalis subsp. pumila (Rydb.) Babc. & Stebbins – British Columbia; California, Idaho, Montana, Nevada, Oregon, Utah, Washington

== Cultivation ==
Western hawksbeard is occasionally grown by wildflower gardeners for its large deep yellow blooms. The taproot cannot be divided for successful propagation and therefore it is planted from seed when cultivated. The author Claude A. Barr was of the opinion that this species is the most attractive in the genus Crepis and that all the others are, "for the birds."
