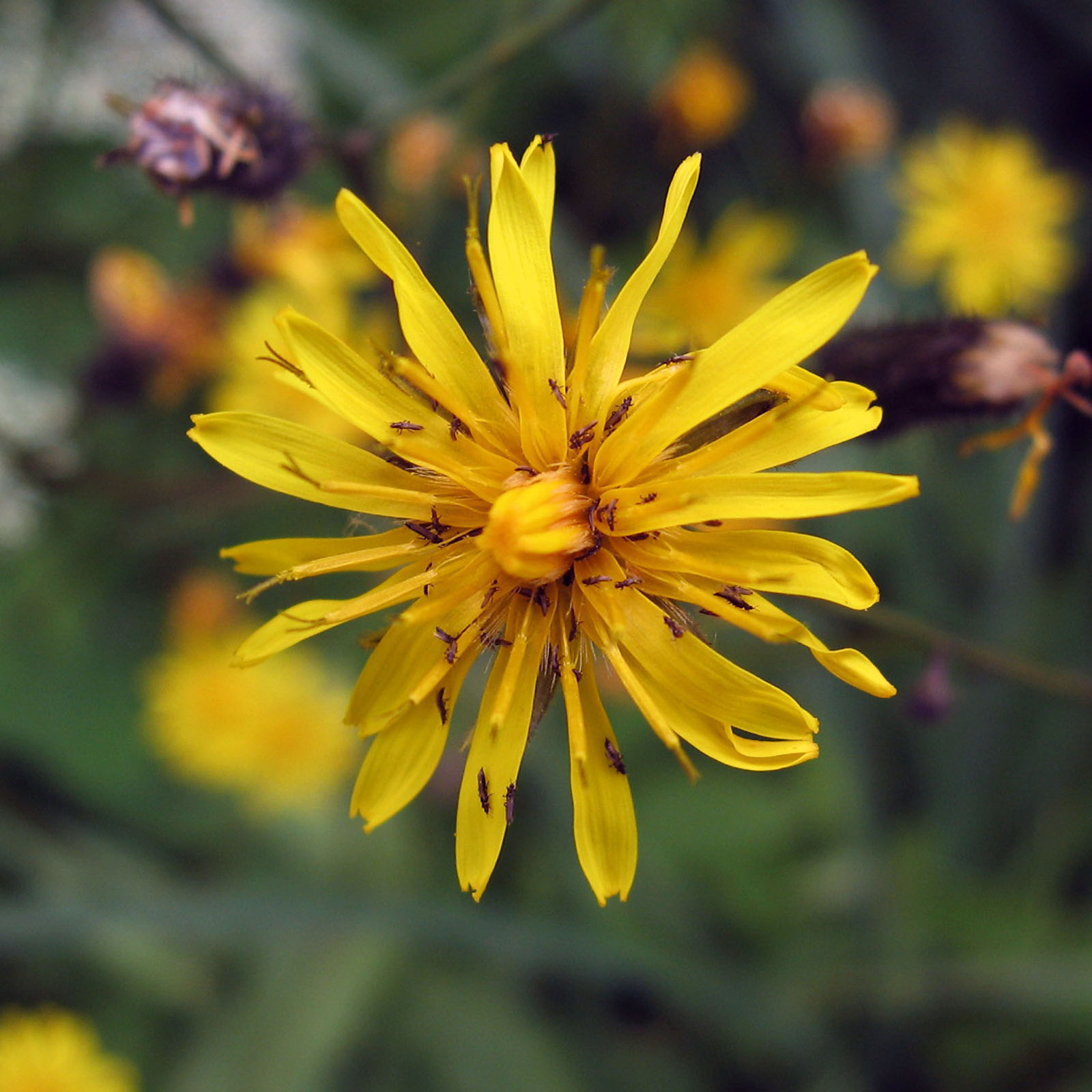
- Inflorescence

Scientific classification
- Kingdom: Plantae
- Clade: Tracheophytes
- Clade: Angiosperms
- Clade: Eudicots
- Clade: Asterids
- Order: Asterales
- Family: Asteraceae
- Genus: Crepis
- Species: C. tectorum

Binomial name
- Crepis tectorum L.

Synonyms
- Synonymy: Crepis arvensis Jáv.; Crepis barckhausioides Rouy; Crepis campestris Schur; Crepis integrifolia Vest; Crepis lanceolata Kit.; Crepis murorum S.G.Gmel.; Crepis segetalis Roth ex Steud.; Crepis tectoria Dulac; Crepis tinctoria Dulac; Hedypnois tectorum (L.) Huds.; Hieracioides tectorum (L.) Kuntze; Hieracium tectorum (L.) Karsch

= Crepis tectorum =

Species of flowering plant

Crepis tectorum, commonly referred to as the narrowleaf hawksbeard or narrow-leaved hawk's-beard, is an annual or winter annual plant between 30 and 100 centimetres in height. Originating in Siberia before being introduced to Canada in 1890, the narrowleaf hawksbeard is an invasive species. It has one branched, hairless and leafy stem during maturity, and yellow leaves which are less than 0.5 inches (13 mm) wide and arranged in an alternate manner.

The narrowleaf hawksbeard's scientific name 'Crepis tectorum' originates from the Greek word krepis meaning sandal or slipper, which refers to the shape of the seed.

== Distribution ==
Crepis tectorum is native to most of Europe, as well as northern and central Asia (Russia, Kazakhstan, Mongolia, and parts of China (Inner Mongolia, Heilongjiang, Xinjiang)).

The species is now naturalized in much of Canada, Greenland, and northern parts of the United States including Alaska. Narrowleaf hawksbeard is now commonly found in the parkland zone of Alberta, Saskatchewan and Manitoba. Crepis tectorum is found in waste areas, conventional tillage, reduced tillage, forage and hay fields, and roadsides.

== Identification ==
Crepis tectorum is identified by its long, erect stem and yellow, dandelion-like flowers. The leaves are pointed and lobed with a length of 10–15 centimetres (3.9–5.9 in) and width up to 4 cm (1.6 in). The flower heads look like they contain single flowers, but in fact they contain many ray florets.

=== Seedling ===
Crepis tectorum may look similar to a dandelion at this stage but will have teeth that point downward on the underside leaf margin. The cotyledons are oval and the first true leaves are more elongated with petioles.

=== Juvenile ===
The juvenile stage of the narrowleaf hawksbeard is distinguishable by its rosette of leaves. The stem may contain a milky-white latex.

=== Mature ===
A mature Crepis tectorum plant will have dandelion-like flowers, with many flower heads on each stem. When the plant had gone to seed it will have a white, fluffy head where the flower used to be. The seeds are dark purple/brown achenes dispersed by the wind using hairs called the pappus.

== Habitat and ecology ==
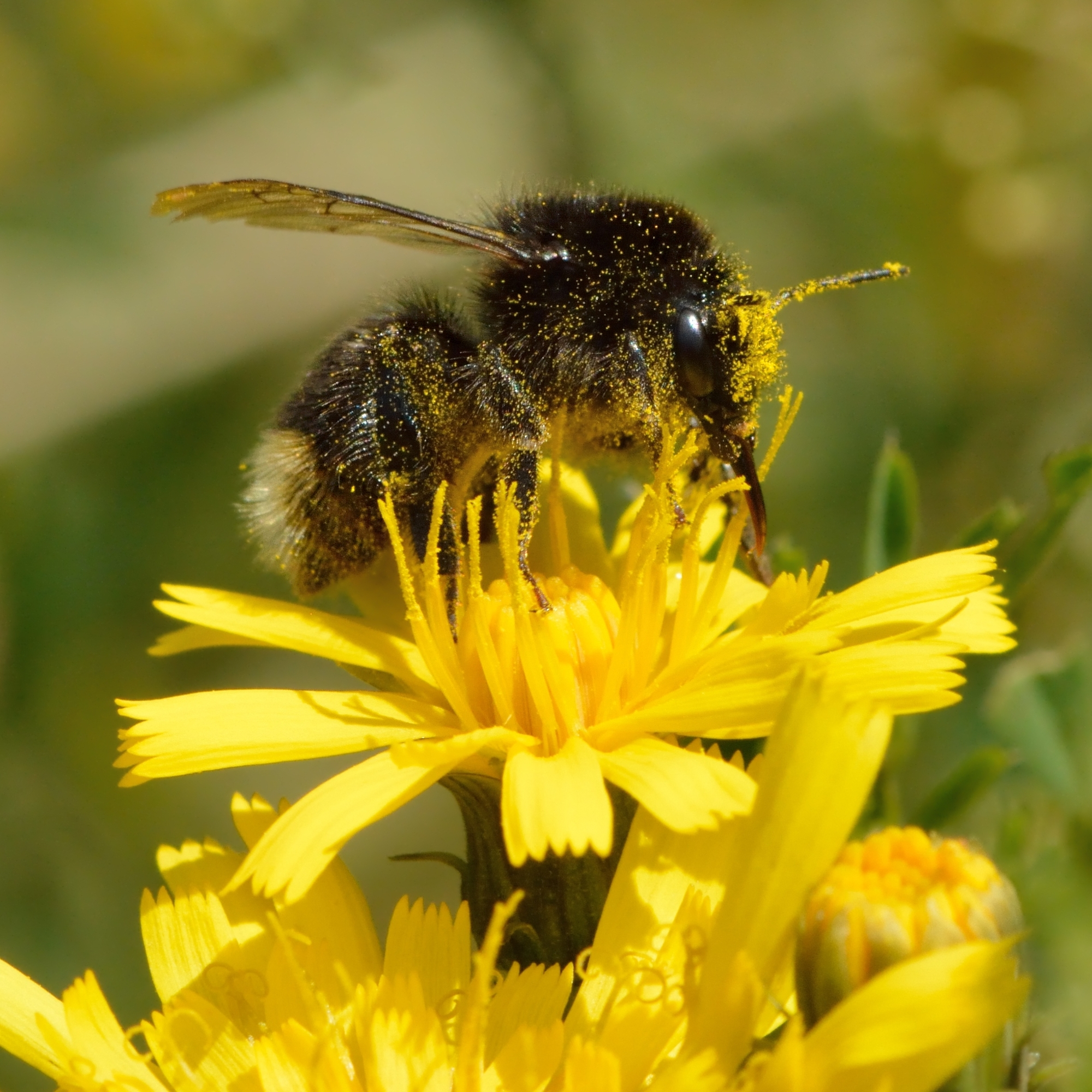
Pollination

Crepis tectorum is an annual weed that grows in cultivated fields and roadsides. It is very invasive so it can take over a field and lead to serious ecological impacts for the surrounding. Crepis tectorum is able to grow in calcareous soil as well as soil that does not contain lime. However, it grows best in nutrient rich soils containing clays and loams. It also thrives in dry, coarse soil. It grows with other species in the wild however, it becomes infectious if not controlled by humans. It can easily be removed by hand, although it can be controlled better by chemical means. The presence of the narrowleaf hawksbeard is damaging to the soil and other species of plants nearby as it generally takes over the area. The temperature range for germination is 2–4 °C (36–39 °F), with an optimum depth of 3–4 cm (1.2–1.6 in).

== Morphology ==
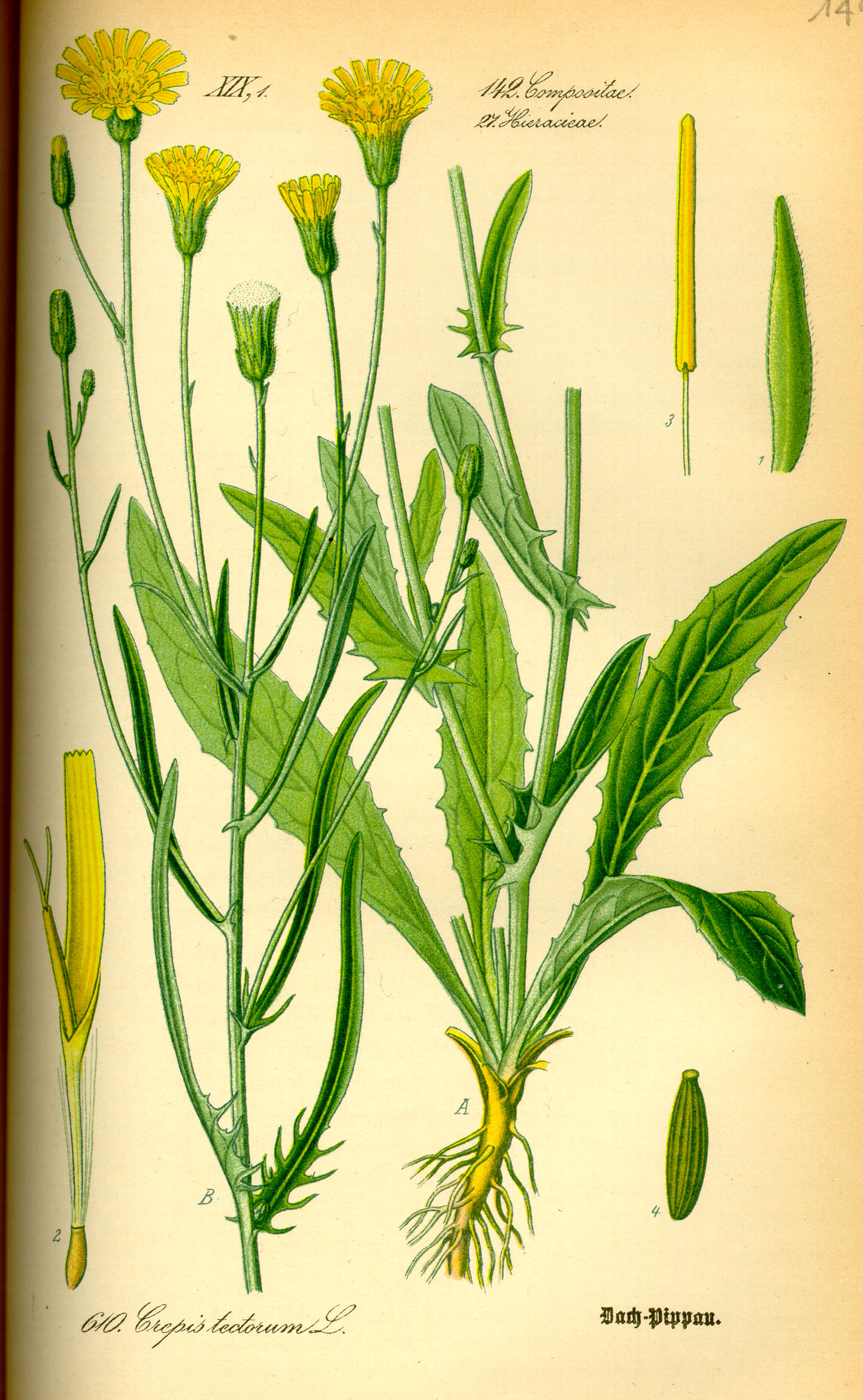
Illustration of C. tectorum

Individuals of this species are usually approximately 3 feet (0.91 m) tall, single-stemmed, yellow petals on flowers, and produce 30–70 yellow ray florets.

== Flowers and fruit ==
Inflorescences of Crepis tectorum are approximately ½-¾ inches wide and are hermaphrodite, having both male and female organs. It produces small flowers from June until September. The fruit is cylindrical shaped and dark brown. The fruit of Crepis tectorum is dry and is called an achene.

== Methods of control ==
Narrowleaf hawksbeard responds best to a fall application of 2,4-DB herbicide. Non-chemical methods of control include spring or fall tillage to control winter annuals and the correct use of agronomic practices such as fertilization for the control of annuals. Biological control can be achieved by insects, non-domestic animals, microorganisms, and viruses. However, the use of biological control can be risky and should always be approached with caution.
