= Crepis incana =

Scientific classification
- Kingdom: Plantae
- Clade: Tracheophytes
- Clade: Angiosperms
- Clade: Eudicots
- Clade: Asterids
- Order: Asterales
- Family: Asteraceae
- Genus: Crepis
- Species: C. incana

Binomial name
- Crepis incana Sibth. & Sm. May 1813 not Lapeyr. July 1813 nor Ledeb. 1846

Species of flowering plant

Crepis incana, the pink dandelion, is a species of flowering plant in the genus Crepis of the family Asteraceae, native to southern Greece. It is a rosette-forming herbaceous perennial growing to 30 cm (12 in) tall and wide. Superficially similar to the true dandelion (Taraxacum), it produces bright pink flower heads in late summer.

It has gained the Royal Horticultural Society's Award of Garden Merit.
