= Crepis phoenix =

Scientific classification
- Kingdom: Plantae
- Clade: Tracheophytes
- Clade: Angiosperms
- Clade: Eudicots
- Clade: Asterids
- Order: Asterales
- Family: Asteraceae
- Genus: Crepis
- Species: C. phoenix

Binomial name
- Crepis phoenix Dunn

Species of flowering plant

Crepis phoenix is a Chinese species of flowering plant in the tribe Cichorieae within the family Asteraceae. It has been found only in the province of Yunnan in southern China.

Crepis phoenix is a perennial herb up to 70 cm tall, with a large taproot. It produces a flat-topped array of numerous small flower heads. Each head has as many as 25 yellow ray florets but no disc florets. The species grows on mountain slopes.
