= Crepis monticola =

Scientific classification
- Kingdom: Plantae
- Clade: Tracheophytes
- Clade: Angiosperms
- Clade: Eudicots
- Clade: Asterids
- Order: Asterales
- Family: Asteraceae
- Genus: Crepis
- Species: C. monticola

Binomial name
- Crepis monticola Coville

Synonyms
- Psilochenia monticola (Coville) W.A.Weber

Species of flowering plant

Crepis monticola is a North American species of flowering plant in the family Asteraceae known by the common name mountain hawksbeard.

== Distribution ==
This aster-like flower is native to northern California and southern Oregon, in the Klamath Mountains and Northern California Coast Ranges.

It grows in woodlands and dry Yellow pine forest and Red fir forest habitats.

== Description ==
Crepis monticola is a taprooted perennial which rarely exceeds 30 centimeters (12 inches) in height. The dense foliage is made up of highly lobed and toothed leaves forming a wrinkled, bristly clump. It is often covered in sticky exudate.

The inflorescence is a cluster of several flower heads, each made up of about 20 golden yellow ligules with toothed tips, but no disc florets.

The fruit is a small achene with a white pappus.
