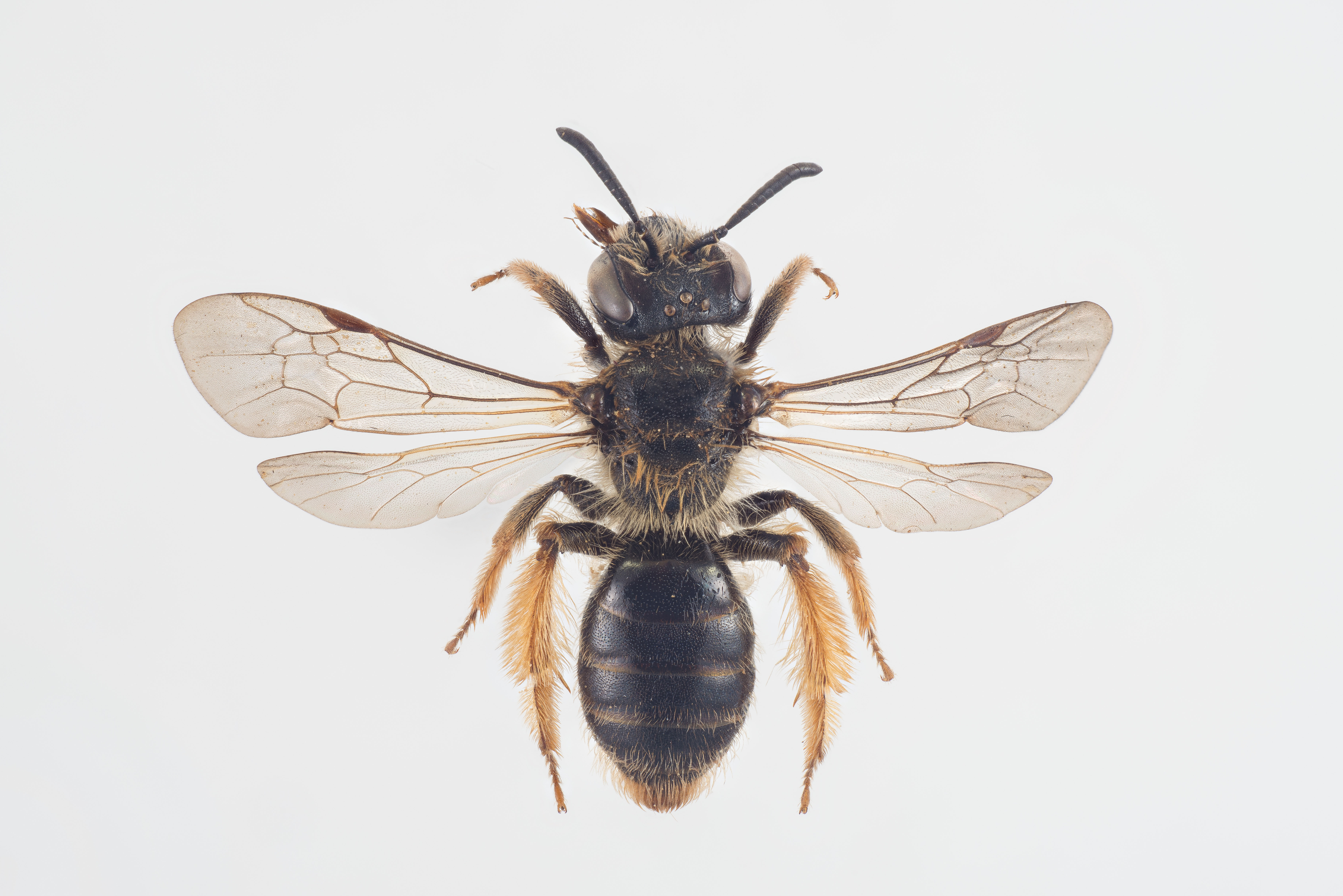

Scientific classification
- Kingdom: Animalia
- Phylum: Arthropoda
- Class: Insecta
- Order: Hymenoptera
- Family: Andrenidae
- Genus: Andrena
- Species: A. fulvago

Binomial name
- Andrena fulvago Christ, 1791

= Andrena fulvago =

Species of bee

Andrena fulvago, also known as the hawk's-beard mining-bee, is a species of bee in the Andrenidae family. The scientific name of the species was first published in 1791 by Johann Ludwig Christ.

== Name ==
The name in English refers to the flower of the same name which attracts the bees. In Dutch, the bee is called the Texel sand bee after the island of Texel where it is found.

== Description ==
The hawk's-beard mining-bee has a body length of nine to ten millimeters. The color is largely black, but the hind legs and middle body have an orange or golden yellow coat, which is seen as the most striking feature of the species. The males and females can only be kept apart with certainty by studying the genitals.

== Habitat ==
The habitat of the bee consists of grasslands, such as dry meadows, which border forests. The species is monolectic, which means that it only goes to one genus or species to pollinate. The Hawk's-Beard Mining-Bee therefore collects only nectar and pollen from the species from the composite family. It prefers mouse ear, cat's ear, and hawksbeard. The Hawk's-Beard Mining-Bee is a solitary bee species and therefore does not live in a eusociality like some bee species. The nests are buried in few overgrown places, often alone or in small groups, and usually in sandy soils. The period during which the species can be found lasts from May to July.

== Locations ==
The hawk's-beard mining-bee lives in Europe and can be found here from southern Europe to southern Sweden and from Great Britain to the Caucasus. It can be found all over Germany up to 900 metres in height, and in Switzerland up to 2,300 metres in height.
