= Namangana =

Scientific classification
- Domain: Eukaryota
- Kingdom: Animalia
- Phylum: Arthropoda
- Class: Insecta
- Order: Lepidoptera
- Superfamily: Noctuoidea
- Family: Noctuidae
- Genus: Namangana; Staudinger, 1888

Genus of moths

Namangana was a genus of moths of the family Noctuidae. It is now considered a synonym of Hecatera. It consisted of the species Namangana mirabilis, which has been renamed to Hecatera mirabilis.
