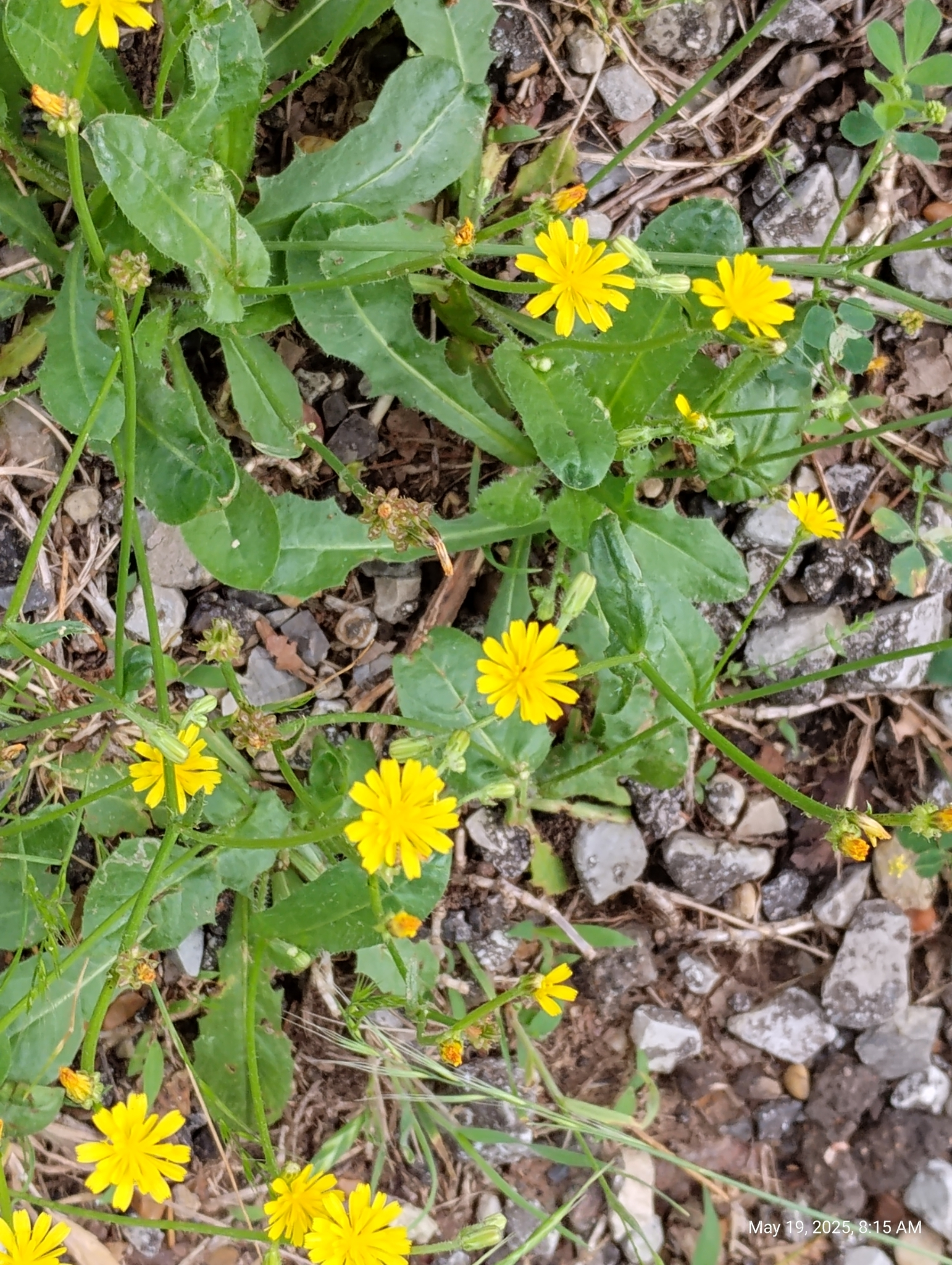
- Crepis zacintha

Scientific classification
- Kingdom: Plantae
- Clade: Embryophytes
- Clade: Tracheophytes
- Clade: Spermatophytes
- Clade: Angiosperms
- Clade: Eudicots
- Clade: Asterids
- Order: Asterales
- Family: Asteraceae
- Genus: Crepis
- Species: C. zacintha

Binomial name
- Crepis zacintha (L.) Babc.

Synonyms
- Hedypnois zacintha (L.) Dum. Cours.; Lapsana zacintha L.; Rhagadiolus zacintha (L.) All.; Zacintha verrucosa Gaertn.

= Crepis zacintha =

Species of flowering plant

Crepis zacintha, the striped hawksbeard, is a plant species native to southern Europe (Greece, Italy, Albania, Bulgaria, etc.) but now naturalized on roadsides and other disturbed sites in Texas, Israel, Cyprus, and the United Kingdom.

Crepis zacintha is an annual herb up to 30 cm (12 inches) tall, often branching above ground. Heads are solitary in the axils of branches. Each head has up to 30 ray florets, yellow with a reddish tinge on the back. There are no disc florets.
