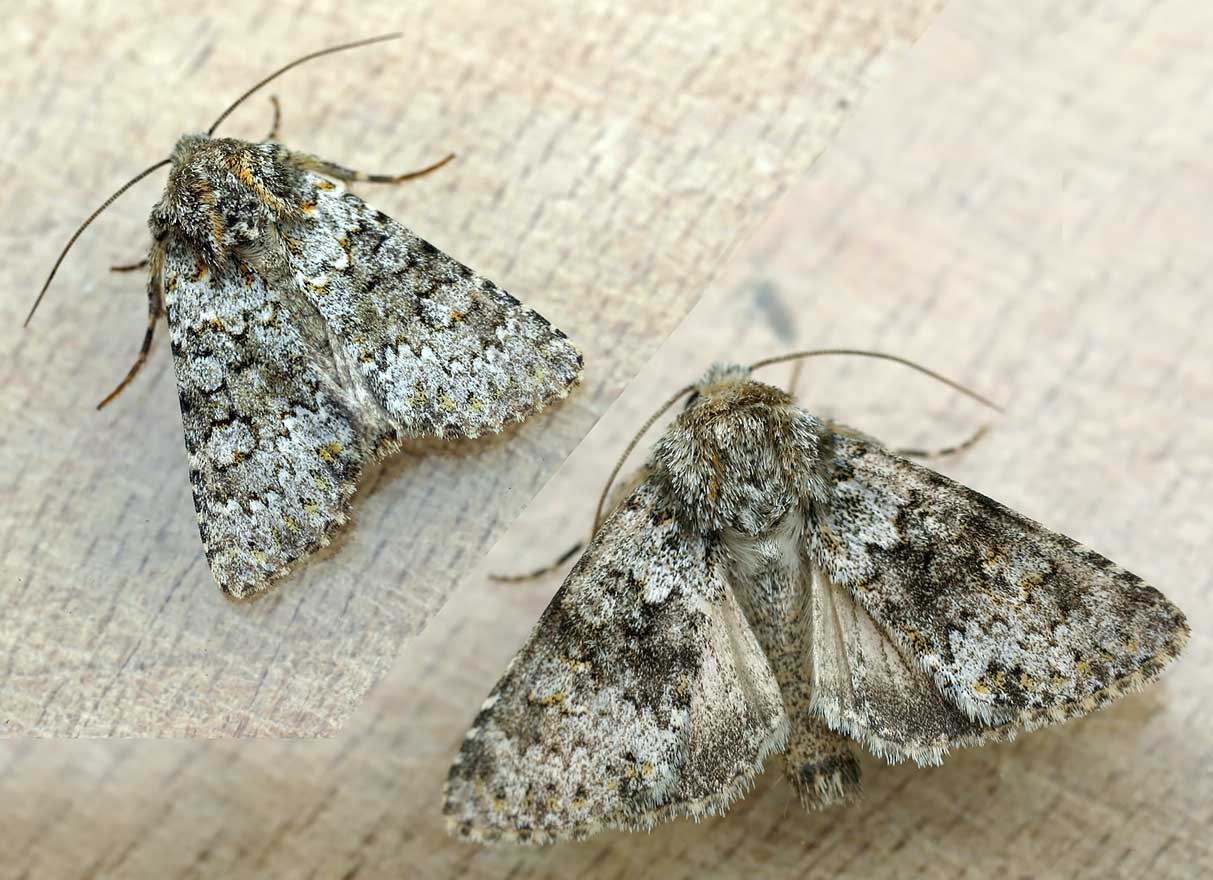

Scientific classification
- Kingdom: Animalia
- Phylum: Arthropoda
- Class: Insecta
- Order: Lepidoptera
- Superfamily: Noctuoidea
- Family: Noctuidae
- Genus: Hecatera
- Species: H. dysodea

Binomial name
- Hecatera dysodea (Denis & Schiffermüller, 1775)

Synonyms
- Noctua dysodea; Aetheria dysodea; Noctua spinaciae; Noctua ranunculina; Polia caduca; Polia subflava; Polia faroulti; Polia antitypina; Mamestra dysodea khala

= Hecatera dysodea =

Species of moth

Hecatera dysodea, the small ranunculus, is a moth of the family Noctuidae. It is found in Europe, primarily in Central Europe and Southern Europe. The northern boundary of the distribution is from the Baltic Sea and the southern part of Lithuania, Belarus, south of Moscow to the Urals. North Africa forms the distribution border in the south (from Algeria and Morocco) east they extend to the Middle East, Turkestan and across the Palearctic to Central Asia. It is an introduced species in North America, where it was first found in Utah in 1998 and Oregon in 2005.

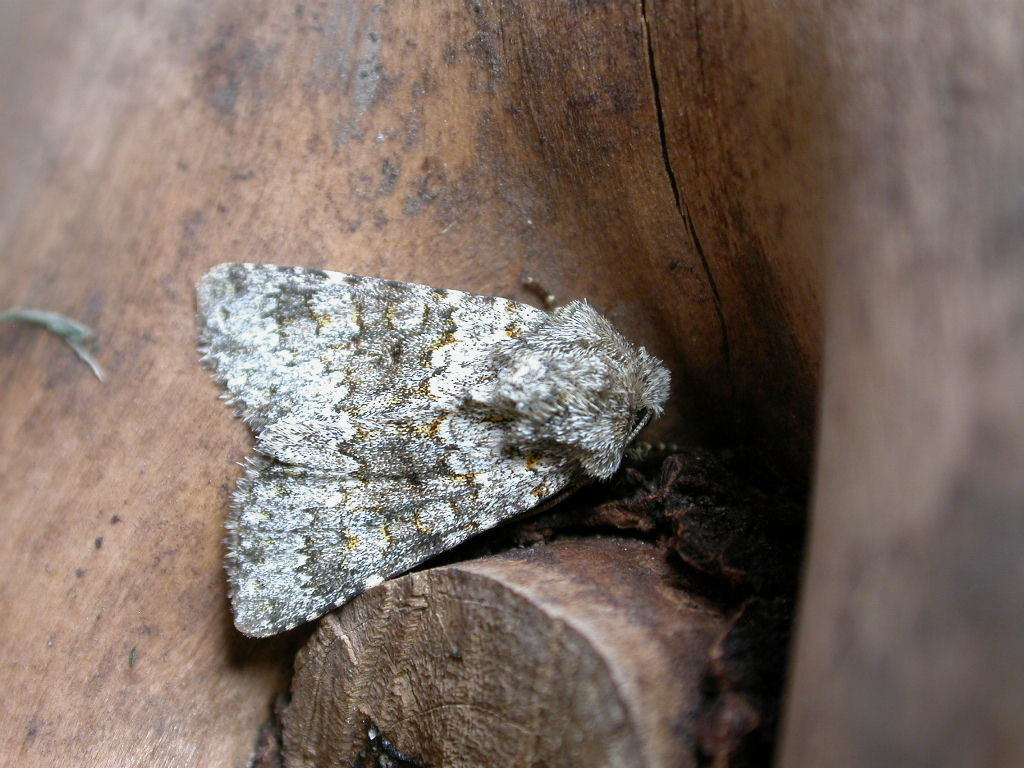

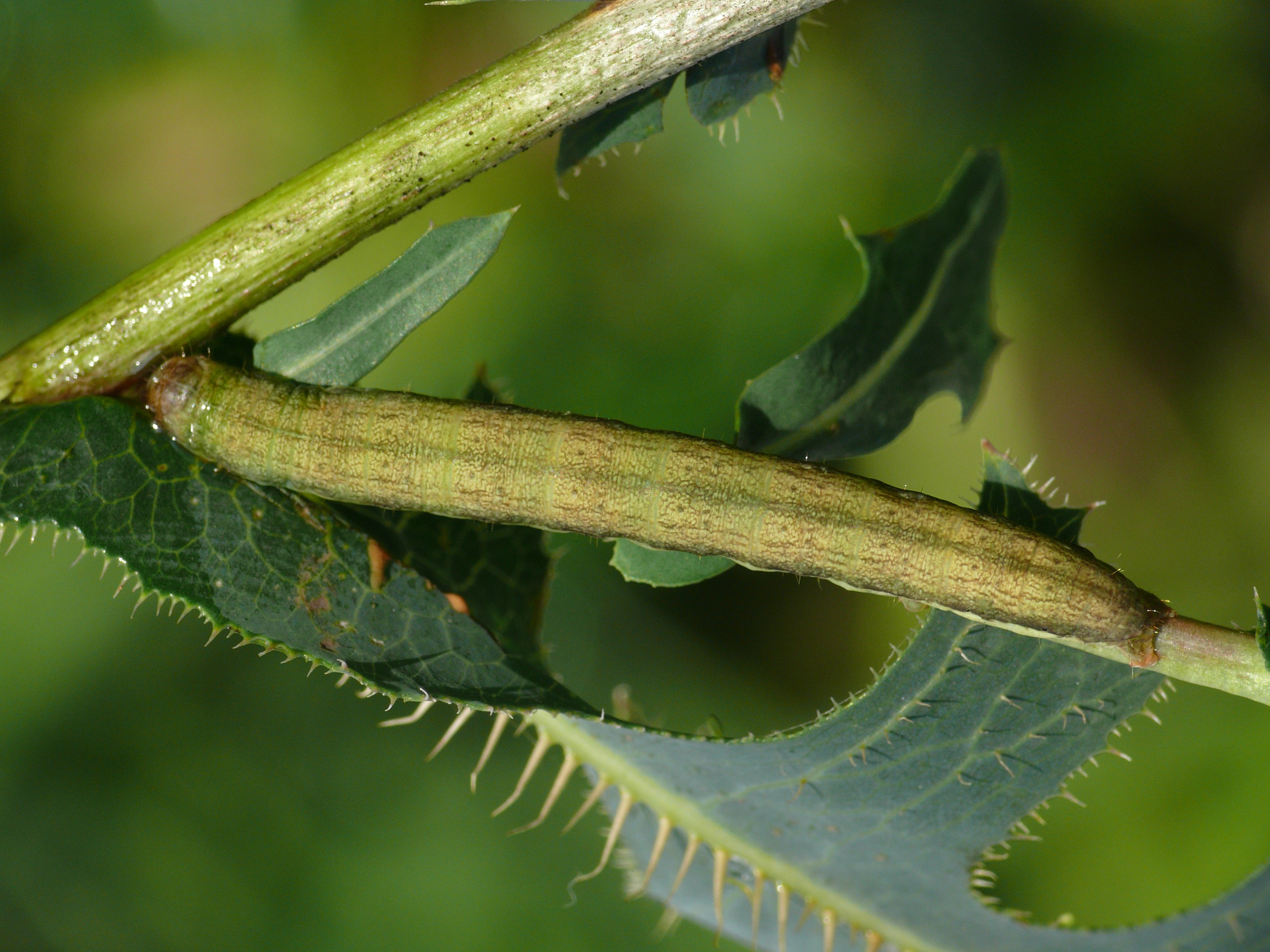
Larva

The wingspan is 32–34 mm. The length of the forewings is 14–15 mm. Meyrick describes it thus - Forewings whitish irrorated with grey, median area suffused with grey and partly mixed with orange; subbasal line whitish, edged anteriorly with black mixed with orange; first and second lines whitish, edged internally with blackish; spots outlined with black mixed with orange; subterminal line formed of orange spots, preceded by some black scales. Hindwings pale grey, with darker posterior suffusion. Larva pale dull green, or yellowish freckled with brown; dorsal line pale, dark-edged; lateral dark, indistinct; spiracles black; head ochreous-brown or dull greenish. Seitz - P. spinaciae Hew. (= dysodea Schiff, flavicincta-minor Esp., chrysozona Bkh., ornata Vill, ranunculina Haw., dysodea of Plate 17). Forewing pale- or greenish-grey, dusted with dark grey; median area darker; all the lines and markings picked out with orange scales; claviform stigma dark; the upper two grey; hindwing dull grey in male, dark grey in female, with broad dark border, the veins and cellspot dark; caduca H-Sch. (17 ¢) is a pale grey form with very little yellow scaling: in innocens Stg. (17g) the median area is blacker, and the inner and outer, by comparison, paler, the yellow scaling slight; koechlini Th.-Mg. (= turbida Hofm.) is a darker form with the orange markings strongly developed. Throughout Europe: in Asia Minor, Persia, Syria, Kashmir, Turkestan, and China. — Larva yellow green, freckled with brown; dorsal line pale, darkedged.

== Biology ==
The moths are found mainly on the edge or in localities. They prefer dry ruderal areas, brownfields, roadsides, embankments, gardens and parks. In the Alps they rise up to 1400 m. They fly in one generation from May to mid August.. Their cocoons typically hatch during the month of June when the humidity levels increase

The larvae feed on flowers and seeds of Asteraceae species, especially Lactuca species.

== Subspecies ==
There are two recognised subspecies:

- Hecatera dysodea dysodea
- Hecatera dysodea nebulosa

== Notes ==
1. The flight season refers to Belgium and The Netherlands. This may vary in other parts of the range.
