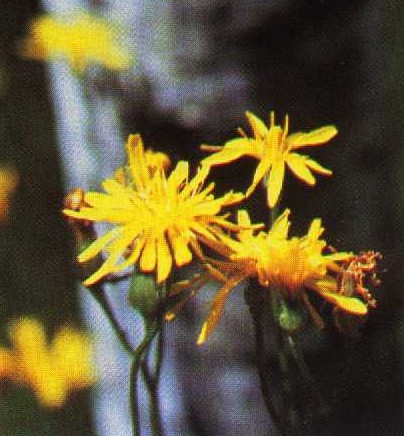

Conservation status
- Secure (NatureServe)

Scientific classification
- Kingdom: Plantae
- Clade: Tracheophytes
- Clade: Angiosperms
- Clade: Eudicots
- Clade: Asterids
- Order: Asterales
- Family: Asteraceae
- Genus: Crepis
- Species: C. runcinata

Binomial name
- Crepis runcinata (James) Torr. & A.Gray

Synonyms
- Synonymy: Berinia runcinata (E.James) Sch.Bip.; Crepidium runcinatum Nutt; Crepis alpicola (Rydb.) A.Nelson; Crepis dakotana Lunell; Crepis denticulata Rydb.; Crepis glaucella Rydb.; Crepis neomexicana Wooton & Standl.; Crepis perplexans Rydb.; Crepis tomentulosa Rydb.; Hieracioides runcinatum (E.James) Kuntze; Hieracium runcinatum E.James; Psilochenia runcinata] Á.Löve & D.Löve; Crepis andersonii A.Gray, syn of subsp. andersonii; Crepis subcarnosa Greene, syn of subsp. andersonii; Crepis barberi Greenm., syn of subsp. barberi; Crepis mogollonica Greene, syn of subsp. barberi; Crepidium caulescens Nutt., syn of subsp. glauca; Crepidium glaucum Nutt., syn of subsp. glauca; Crepis chamaephylla Wooton & Standl., syn of subsp. glauca; Crepis glauca (Nutt.) Torr. & A.Gray, syn of subsp. glauca; Hieracioides caulescens (Nutt.) Kuntze, syn of subsp. glauca; Crepis aculeolata Greene, syn of subsp. hispidulosa; Crepis obtusissima Greene, syn of subsp. hispidulosa; Crepis pallens Greene, syn of subsp. hispidulosa; Crepis petiolata Rydb., syn of subsp. hispidulosa; Crepis platyphylla Greene, syn of subsp. hispidulosa; Crepis riparia A.Nelson, syn of subsp. hispidulosa

= Crepis runcinata =

Species of flowering plant

Crepis runcinata is a North American species of flowering plant in the family Asteraceae known by the common name fiddleleaf hawksbeard. It is native to western and central Canada (from British Columbia to Manitoba), the western and central United States (from the Pacific as far east as Minnesota, Iowa, western Kansas and northwestern Texas) and northern Mexico (Chihuahua).

Crepis runcinata grows in many types of habitats. It is a variable species with many subspecies. In general it is a perennial herb growing an erect, hairless, mostly leafless, unbranching stem up to about 80 centimeters (32 inches) tall from a taproot. The hairless leaves are arranged about the base of the plant in a rosette, each somewhat narrowly oval with many toothlike triangular lobes or sometimes lacking lobes. The inflorescence produces flower heads with hairy, glandular phyllaries and many yellow ray florets but no disc florets. The fruit is a small achene with a pappus.

Subspecies

- Crepis runcinata subsp. andersonii (A.Gray) Babc. & Stebbins – California, Nevada
- Crepis runcinata subsp. barberi (Greenm.) Babc. & Stebbins – Arizona, Nevada, New Mexico, Chihuahua.
- Crepis runcinata subsp. glauca (Nutt.) Babc. & Stebbins – Alberta, Manitoba, Saskatchewan; Arizona, Colorado, Idaho, Montana, North Dakota, Nevada, New Mexico, North Dakota, South Dakota, Texas, Utah, Wyoming
- Crepis runcinata subsp. hallii Babc. & Stebbins – California, Nevada
- Crepis runcinata subsp. hispidulosa (Howell ex Howell) Babc. & Stebbins – Alberta, Saskatchewan; Colorado, Idaho, Montana, North Dakota, Oregon, Utah, Washington, Wyoming
- Crepis runcinata subsp. imbricata Babc. & Stebbins – Nevada, Oregon
- Crepis runcinata subsp. runcinata – Alberta, British Columbia, Manitoba, Saskatchewan; Colorado, Idaho, Minnesota, Montana, Nebraska, Nevada, New Mexico, North Dakota, Oregon, South Dakota, Utah, Washington, Wyoming
