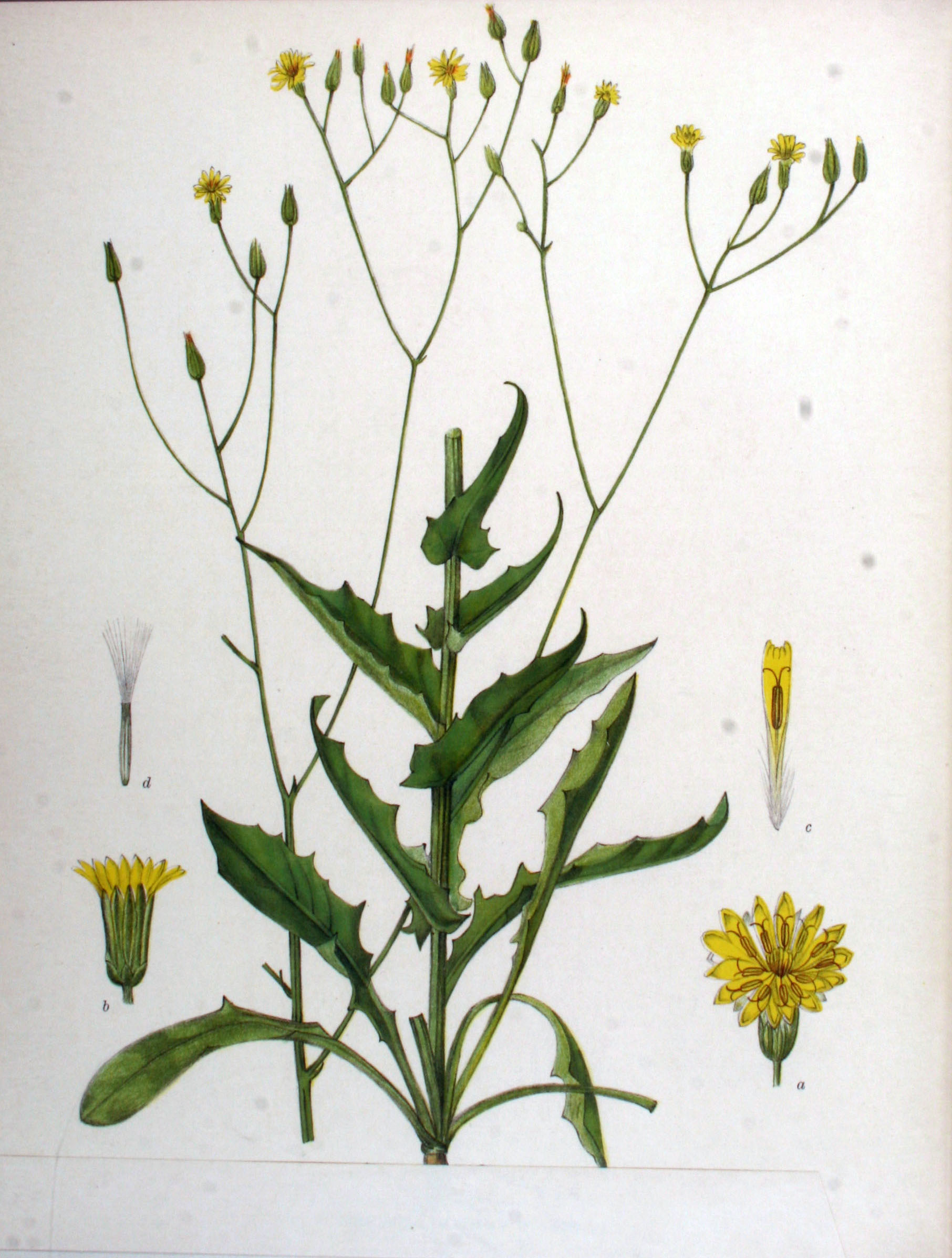

Scientific classification
- Kingdom: Plantae
- Clade: Tracheophytes
- Clade: Angiosperms
- Clade: Eudicots
- Clade: Asterids
- Order: Asterales
- Family: Asteraceae
- Genus: Crepis
- Species: C. pulchra

Binomial name
- Crepis pulchra L.

Synonyms
- Synonymy: Chondrilla pulchra (L.) Lam.; Crepis cichorioides Gand.; Crepis costata Candargy; Crepis cylindrica Cariot & St.-Lag.; Crepis cylindrica St.-Lag.; Crepis deloynei Gand.; Crepis hispanica Pau; Crepis lapsanifolia Rchb.; Crepis oxyphylla Gand.; Crepis pulcherrima Grossh.; Crepis valentina Willk.; Crepis vendeana Gand.; Crepis youngiformis K.Koch; Hieracioides pulchrum (L.) Kuntze; Hieracium glutinosum L.; Idianthes pulchra (L.) Desv.; Intybellia pulchra (L.) Monnier; Lapsana pulchra (L.) Vill.; Launaea pulchra (L.) Pavlov; Phaecasium lampsanoides Cass.; Phaecasium pulchrum (L.) Rchb.f.; Phaecasium pulchrum (L.) Benth. & Hook.f.; Prenanthes hieraciifolia Willd.; Prenanthes paniculata Moench; Prenanthes pulchra (L.) DC.; Prenanthes viscosa Baumg.; Sclerophyllum pulchrum (L.) Gaudin; Sonchus glutinosus (L.) Lam.; Youngia kochiana Ledeb.; Crepis carinata Babc., syn of subsp. turkestanica

= Crepis pulchra =

Species of flowering plant

Crepis pulchra is a European species of flowering plant in the family Asteraceae with the common name smallflower hawksbeard. It is widespread across much of Europe as well as in Morocco, Algeria, and western and central Asia. It has also become naturalized in the parts of the United States and in the Canadian Province of Ontario.

Crepis pulchra is an annual herb up to 100 cm (40 inches) tall. One plant can produce as many as 40 flower heads, each with as many as 30 yellow ray florets but no disc florets.

Subspecies

- Crepis pulchra subsp. pulchra
- Crepis pulchra subsp. turkestanica Babc.
