= Hecatera weissi =

Scientific classification
- Domain: Eukaryota
- Kingdom: Animalia
- Phylum: Arthropoda
- Class: Insecta
- Order: Lepidoptera
- Superfamily: Noctuoidea
- Family: Noctuidae
- Genus: Hecatera
- Species: H. weissi

Binomial name
- Hecatera weissi (Boursin, 1952)

Synonyms
- Polia serena f. weissi (Draudt, 1934)

Species of moth

Hecatera weissi is a species of moth of the family Noctuidae. It is found in southern Europe, North Africa, Turkey, Israel, Jordan and Saudi Arabia.

Adults are on wing from January to April in semi-arid regions and from March to May in temperate regions. There is one generation per year.

== Subspecies ==
- Hecatera weissi weissi
- Hecatera weissi levantina
