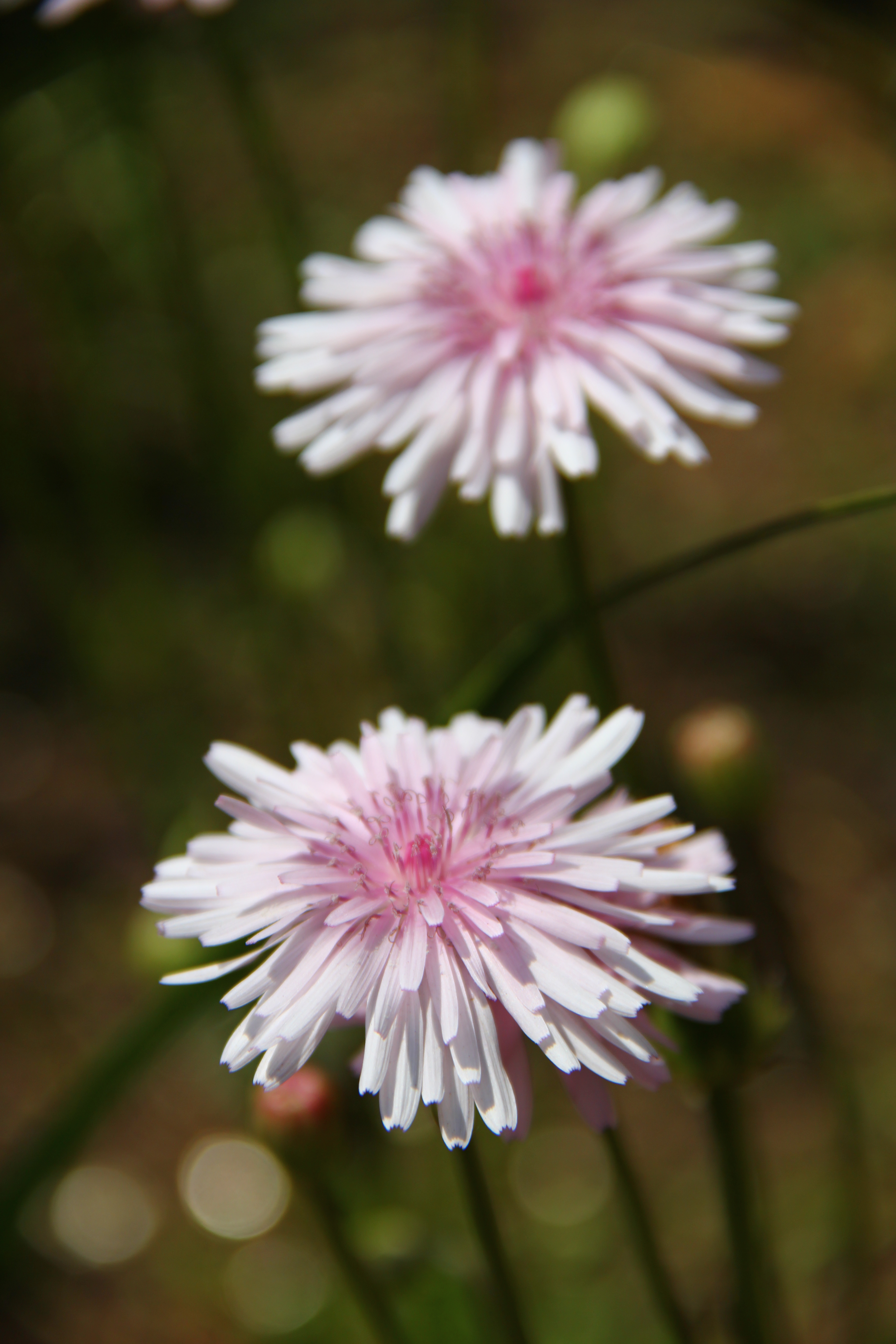

Scientific classification
- Kingdom: Plantae
- Clade: Tracheophytes
- Clade: Angiosperms
- Clade: Eudicots
- Clade: Asterids
- Order: Asterales
- Family: Asteraceae
- Genus: Crepis
- Species: C. rubra

Binomial name
- Crepis rubra L.

Synonyms
- Synonymy: Anisoderis rubra (L.) Cass.; Barkhausia auriculifolia Rchb.; Barkhausia rubra (L.) Moench; Crepis auriculifolia Froel.; Crepis incarnata Vis.; Hieracioides rubrum (L.) Kuntze; Hostia rubra (L.) Cass.; Picris rubra (L.) Lam.

= Crepis rubra =

Species of flowering plant

Crepis rubra is a European species of flowering plant in the family Asteraceae with the common name red hawksbeard or pink hawk's-beard. It is native to the eastern Mediterranean region (Italy, Greece, Albania, North Macedonia, Croatia, Montenegro, Bulgaria, and Asia Minor) and is widely cultivated as an ornamental. It became naturalized in a small region of the United States (Marin County just north of San Francisco Bay in California).

Crepis rubra is an annual up to 40 cm (16 in) tall. Each plant will usually produce only one or two flower heads, each with as many as 100 pink or red ray florets but no disc florets. It grows in rocky fields and meadows.
