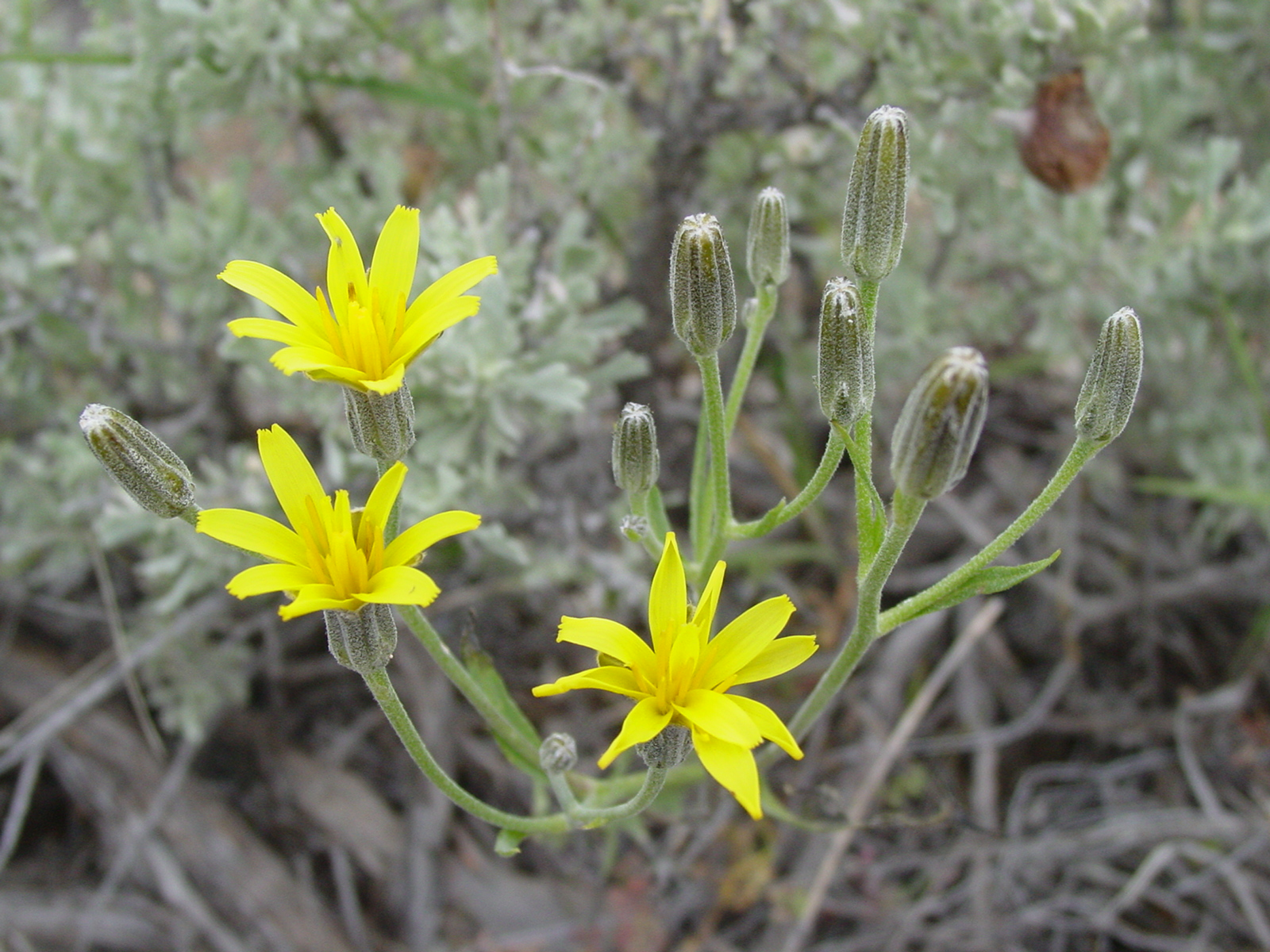

Conservation status
- Secure (NatureServe)

Scientific classification
- Kingdom: Plantae
- Clade: Tracheophytes
- Clade: Angiosperms
- Clade: Eudicots
- Clade: Asterids
- Order: Asterales
- Family: Asteraceae
- Genus: Crepis
- Species: C. acuminata

Binomial name
- Crepis acuminata Nutt.

Synonyms
- Berinia acuminata (Nutt.) Sch.Bip.; Crepis angustata Rydb.; Crepis seselifolia Rydb.; Hieracioides acuminatum (Nutt.) Kuntze; Psilochenia acuminata (Nutt.) W.A.Weber

= Crepis acuminata =

Species of flowering plant

Crepis acuminata is a North American species of flowering plant in the family Asteraceae known by the common name tapertip hawksbeard. It is native to the western United States where it grows in many types of open habitat.

== Description ==
Crepis acuminata is a perennial herb producing a woolly, branching stem up to about 70 centimeters (28 inches) tall from a taproot. The gray-green leaves are 10–40 cm (4–15 1/2 in) long and cut into many triangular, pointed lobes.

The longest, near the base of the plant, may reach 40 cm (16 in) in length. The inflorescence is an open array of flower heads at the top of the stem branches. Each of the many flower heads is about 1.5–2.5 cm (5/8–1 in) wide enveloped in smooth or hairy phyllaries. The flower head opens into a face of up to 10 yellow ray florets. There are no disc florets. The fruit is a narrow achene 7 or 8 millimetres (9/32 or 5/16 in) long tipped with a pappus of white hairlike bristles.

== Distribution and habitat ==
It is native from eastern Washington and eastern California to central Montana, Colorado, and northern New Mexico. It can be found in dry and open areas in sagebrush habitats and coniferous forests.
