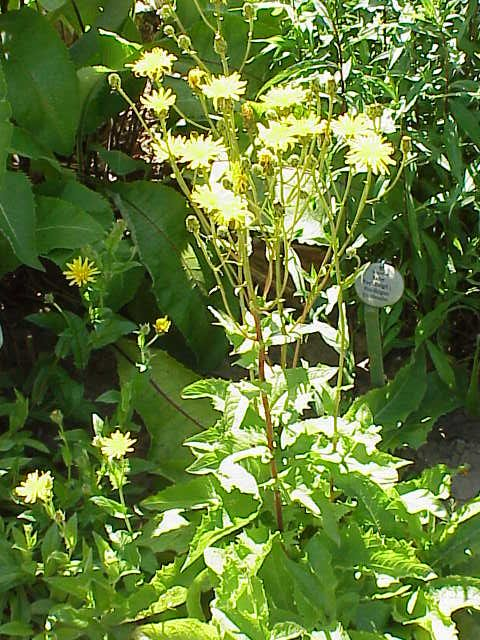

Scientific classification
- Kingdom: Plantae
- Clade: Tracheophytes
- Clade: Angiosperms
- Clade: Eudicots
- Clade: Asterids
- Order: Asterales
- Family: Asteraceae
- Genus: Crepis
- Species: C. sibirica

Binomial name
- Crepis sibirica L.

Synonyms
- Synonymy: Aracium sibiricum (L.) Sch.Bip.; Crepis ruprechtii Boiss.; Hapalostephium sibiricum (L.) D.Don; Hieracioides ruprechtii (Boiss.) Kuntze; Hieracioides sibiricum (L.) Kuntze; Hieracium sibiricum (L.) Lam.; Lepicaune sibirica (L.) K.Koch; Sonchus caucasicus Biehler; Sonchus flexuosus Ledeb.; Soyeria sibirica (L.) Monnier

= Crepis sibirica =

Species of flowering plant

Crepis sibirica is an Asian and eastern European species of plant in the tribe Cichorieae within the family Asteraceae. It has been found in China (Heilongjiang, Liaoning, Inner Mongolia, Xinjiang), Mongolia, Russia, Central Asia, and eastern Europe.

Crepis sibirica is a perennial herb up to 150 cm (5 feet) tall, spreading by means of large underground rhizomes. It produces a flat-topped array of several flower heads. Each head has many yellow ray florets but no disc florets. The species grows on mountain slopes and in forests and grasslands.
