= Hecatera cappa =

Scientific classification
- Domain: Eukaryota
- Kingdom: Animalia
- Phylum: Arthropoda
- Class: Insecta
- Order: Lepidoptera
- Superfamily: Noctuoidea
- Family: Noctuidae
- Genus: Hecatera
- Species: H. cappa

Binomial name
- Hecatera cappa (Hübner, 1809)

Synonyms
- Noctua cappa Hübner, 1809

Species of moth

Hecatera cappa is a species of moth of the family Noctuidae. It is found in Morocco, Algeria, central and south-eastern Europe, Turkey, Transcaucasia, Israel, Lebanon, Jordan, Iran and central Asia.

Adults are on wing from April to May in Israel and at the beginning and end of summer in central Europe. There is one generation per year in Israel. In Europe there are two generations.

The larvae feed on the flowers and seeds of Scrophularia and Delphinium species.
