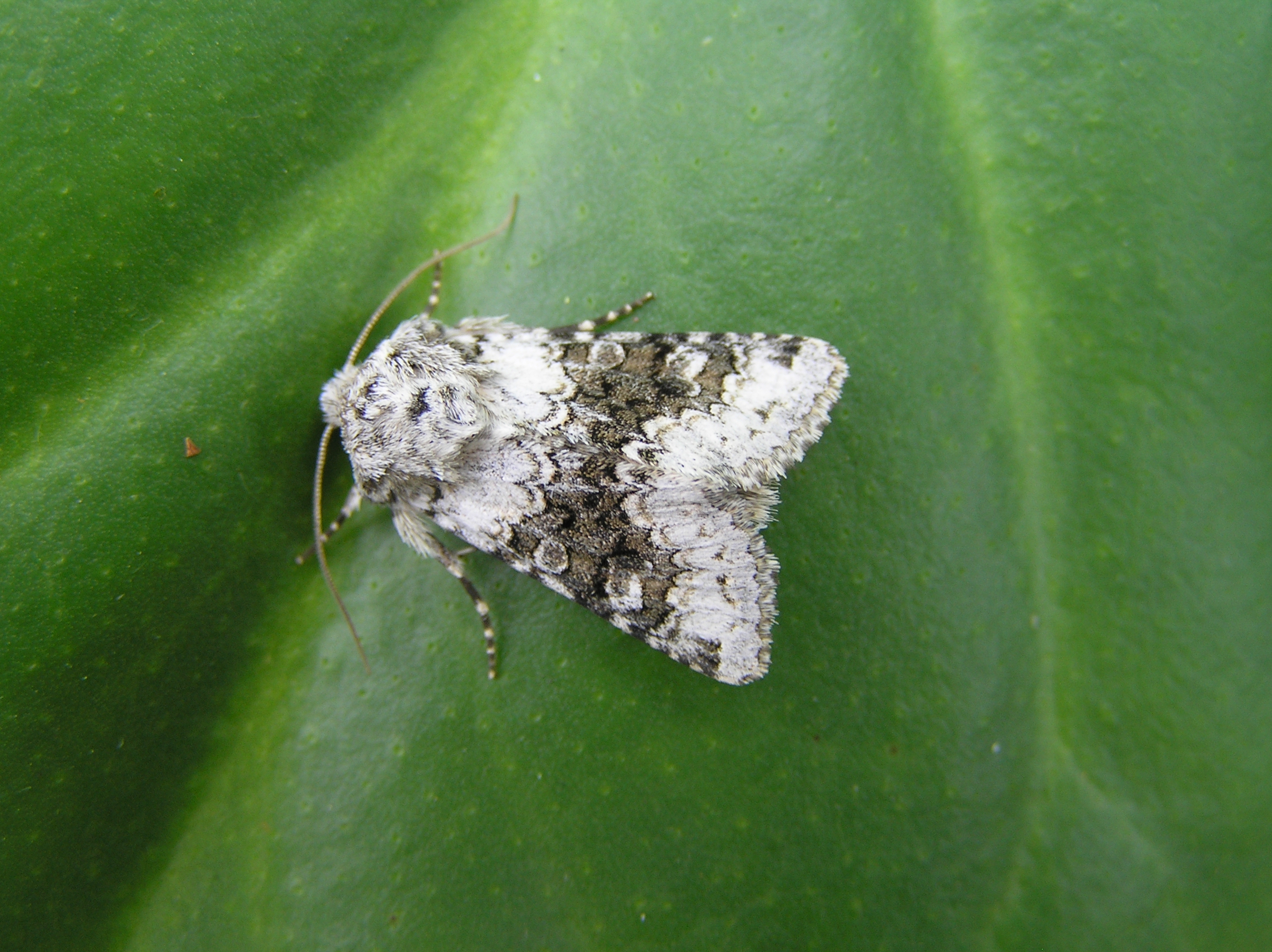
- Broad-barred white (Hecatera bicolorata)

Scientific classification
- Kingdom: Animalia
- Phylum: Arthropoda
- Clade: Pancrustacea
- Class: Insecta
- Order: Lepidoptera
- Superfamily: Noctuoidea
- Family: Noctuidae
- Subfamily: Noctuinae
- Tribe: Hadenini
- Genus: Hecatera; Guenée, 1852

Synonyms
- Epipsammia; Aetheria; Namangana; Sartha; Pseudathetis

= Hecatera =

Genus of moths

Hecatera is a moth genus in the family Noctuidae erected by Achille Guenée in 1852.

== Species ==
- Hecatera agrapha (Boursin, 1960)
- Hecatera bicolorata (Hufnagel, 1766) – broad-barred white
- Hecatera cappa (Hübner, [1809])
- Hecatera confusa (Sugi, 1982)
- Hecatera confusa Leech, 1900
- Hecatera constantialis (Boursin, 1960)
- Hecatera corsica (Rambur, 1832)
- Hecatera deserticola (Staudinger, 1879)
- Hecatera digramme (Fischer von Waldheim, 1820)
- Hecatera disjuncta Hacker & Fibiger, 1999
- Hecatera dysodea (Denis & Schiffermüller, 1775) – small ranunculus
- Hecatera filipjevi (Draudt, 1934)
- Hecatera fixseni (Christoph, 1882)
- Hecatera maderae (Bethune-Baker, 1891)
- Hecatera mirabilis (Staudinger, 1888)
- Hecatera rhodocharis (Brandt, 1938)
- Hecatera weissi (Draudt, 1934)
