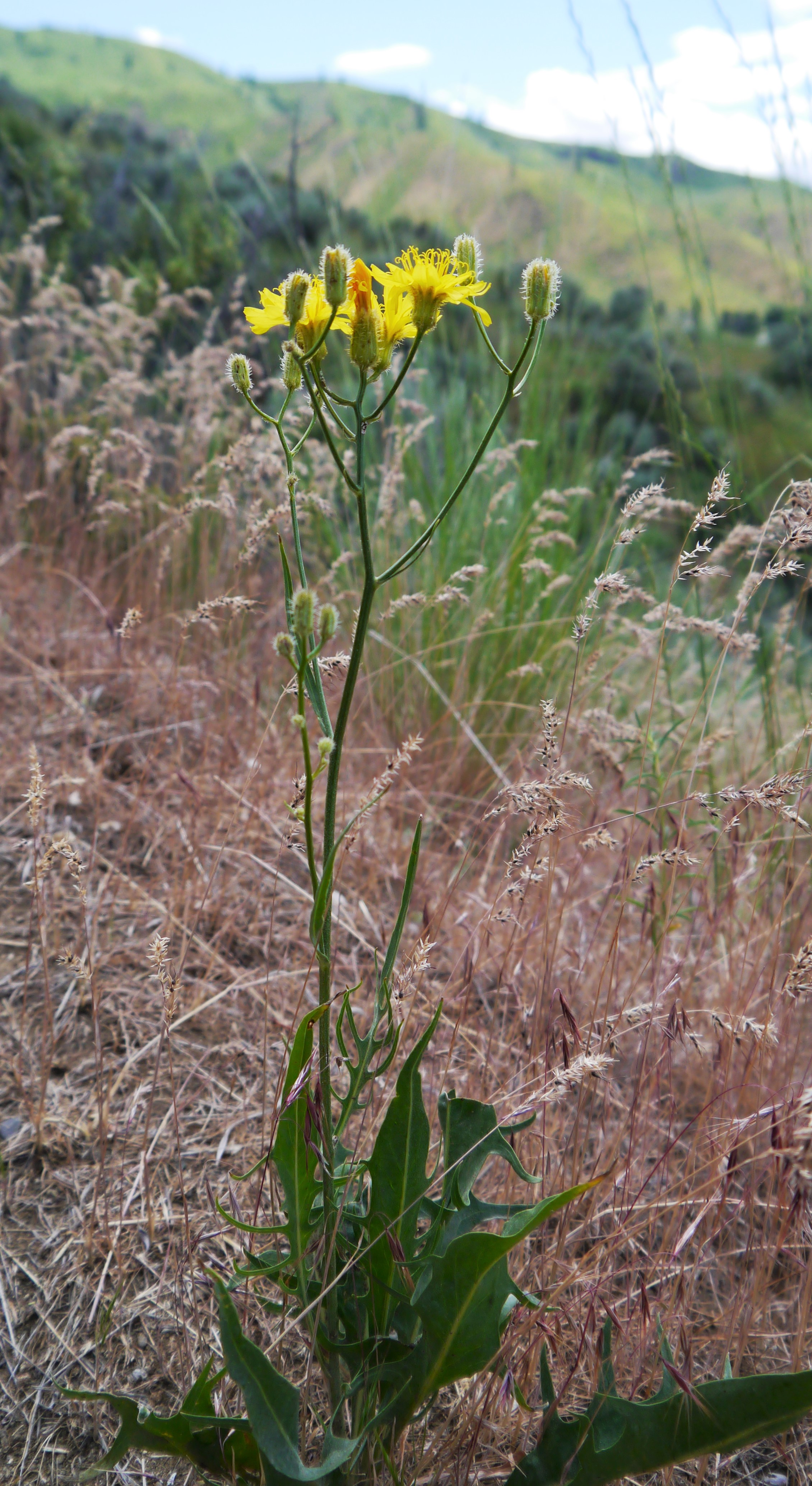
- Crepis barbigera in the Wenatchee foothills, Chelan County Washington

Scientific classification
- Kingdom: Plantae
- Clade: Tracheophytes
- Clade: Angiosperms
- Clade: Eudicots
- Clade: Asterids
- Order: Asterales
- Family: Asteraceae
- Genus: Crepis
- Species: C. barbigera

Binomial name
- Crepis barbigera Leiberg

= Crepis barbigera =

Species of flowering plant

Crepis barbigera is a North American species of flowering plant in the family Asteraceae. It is native to the northwestern United States. It has been found in Washington, Oregon, and Idaho.

Crepis barbigera is a perennial herb up to 80 cm (32 inches) tall, with a slender taproot and expanded woody caudex. One plant can produce as many as 20 small flower heads, each with up to 25 yellow ray florets but no disc florets. Flowers bloom May to July. It grows in a variety of habitats including open rocky places, foothills, plains, and sandy slopes.
