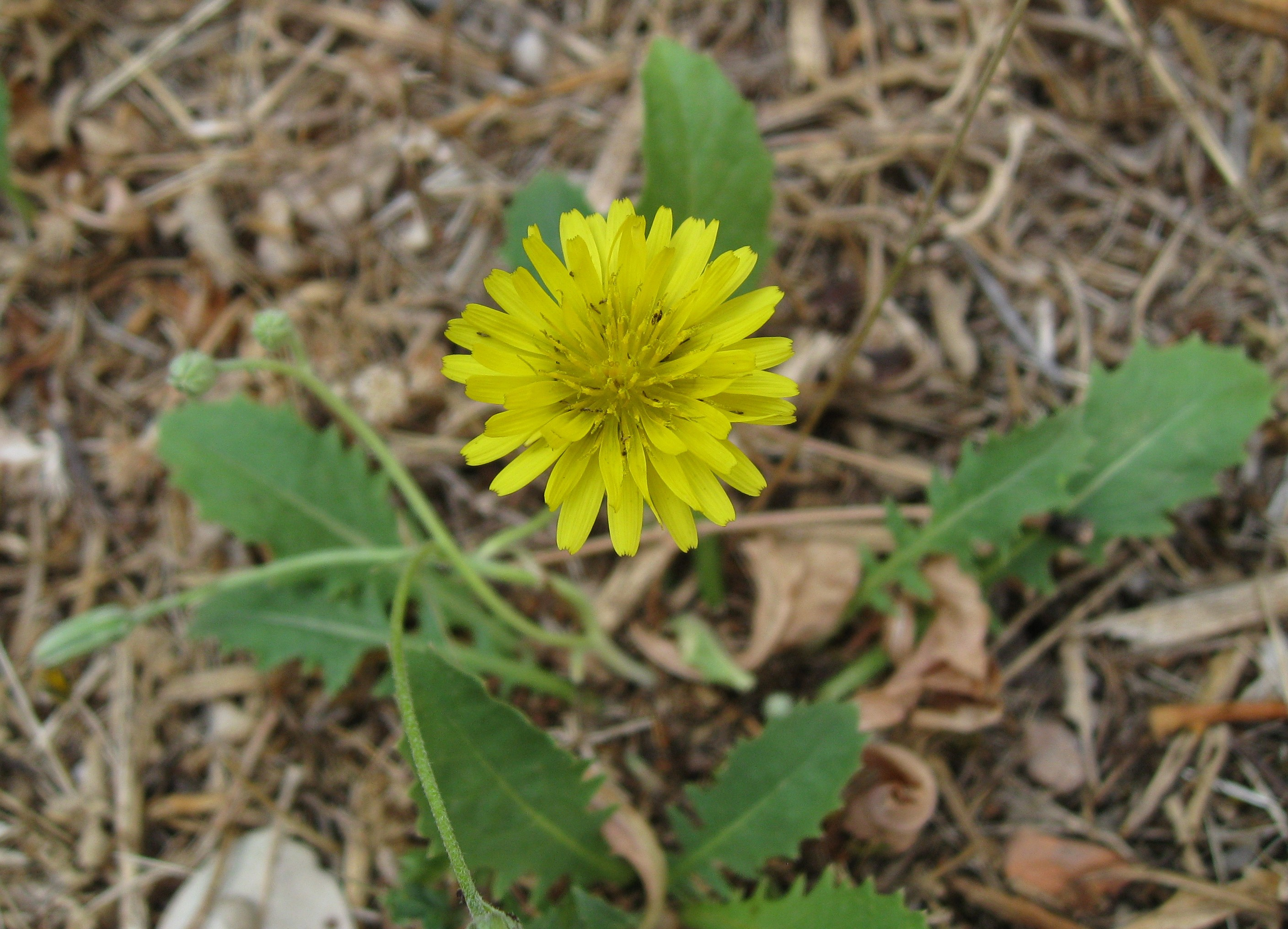

Scientific classification
- Kingdom: Plantae
- Clade: Tracheophytes
- Clade: Angiosperms
- Clade: Eudicots
- Clade: Asterids
- Order: Asterales
- Family: Asteraceae
- Genus: Crepis
- Species: C. bursifolia

Binomial name
- Crepis bursifolia L.

Synonyms
- List: Barkhausia balbisiana DC.; Barkhausia canescens Spreng.; Crepis balbisiana (DC.) F.W.Schultz; Crepis erucifolia Gren. & Godr. 1850 not Tausch 1829; Crepis hirta (Willd.) Pers. 1807 not L. 1753; Hieracioides bursifolium (L.) Kuntze; Hyoseris hirta Balb. ex Willd.; Lagoseris bursifolia (L.) Rchb.; Leontodon gussonei Spreng.

= Crepis bursifolia =

Species of flowering plant

Crepis bursifolia, commonly known as Italian hawksbeard, is a species of flowering plant in the family Asteraceae. It is native to southern Europe (Spain, France, Italy, Malta, Greece), as well as being sparingly naturalized in California (primarily in the hills east of San Francisco Bay, but with a few collections from open spots in urban areas inside the Cities of Oakland and San Francisco).

Crepis bursifolia is a perennial herb up to 35 cm (14 inches) tall. One plant can produce as many as 10 flower heads, each with up to 60 yellow ray florets but no disc florets.
