= Crepis bakeri =

Scientific classification
- Kingdom: Plantae
- Clade: Tracheophytes
- Clade: Angiosperms
- Clade: Eudicots
- Clade: Asterids
- Order: Asterales
- Family: Asteraceae
- Genus: Crepis
- Species: C. bakeri

Binomial name
- Crepis bakeri Greene

Synonyms
- Psilochenia bakeri (Greene) W.A.Weber; Crepis cusickii Eastw.

Species of flowering plant

Crepis bakeri is a species of flowering plant in the family Asteraceae known by the common name Baker's hawksbeard. It is native to the western United States where it grows in many types of mountain and plateau habitat. It is found in Oregon, Washington, Idaho, northern California, Nevada, and Utah.

Crepis bakeri is a perennial herb producing a dark green, hairy, glandular stem up to about 30 centimeters (12 inches) tall from taproot and a thick caudex at ground level. The leaves are narrowly oval and fringed with shallow lobes. They are dark dusty green with reddish or purplish veins and the basal leaves approach 20 centimeters (8 inches) in maximum length. The inflorescence is an open array of up to 22 flower heads. Each has a base of lance-shaped phyllaries which are hairy and often bristly. The flower head contains up to 60 yellow ray florets. There are no disc florets. The fruit is a thin achene up to a centimeter long with an off-white pappus.

Subspecies

- Crepis bakeri subsp. bakeri – California, Nevada, Oregon, Washington
- Crepis bakeri subsp. cusickii (Eastw.) Babc. & Stebbins – California, Oregon, Utah
- Crepis bakeri subsp. idahoensis Babc. & Stebbins – Idaho, California
