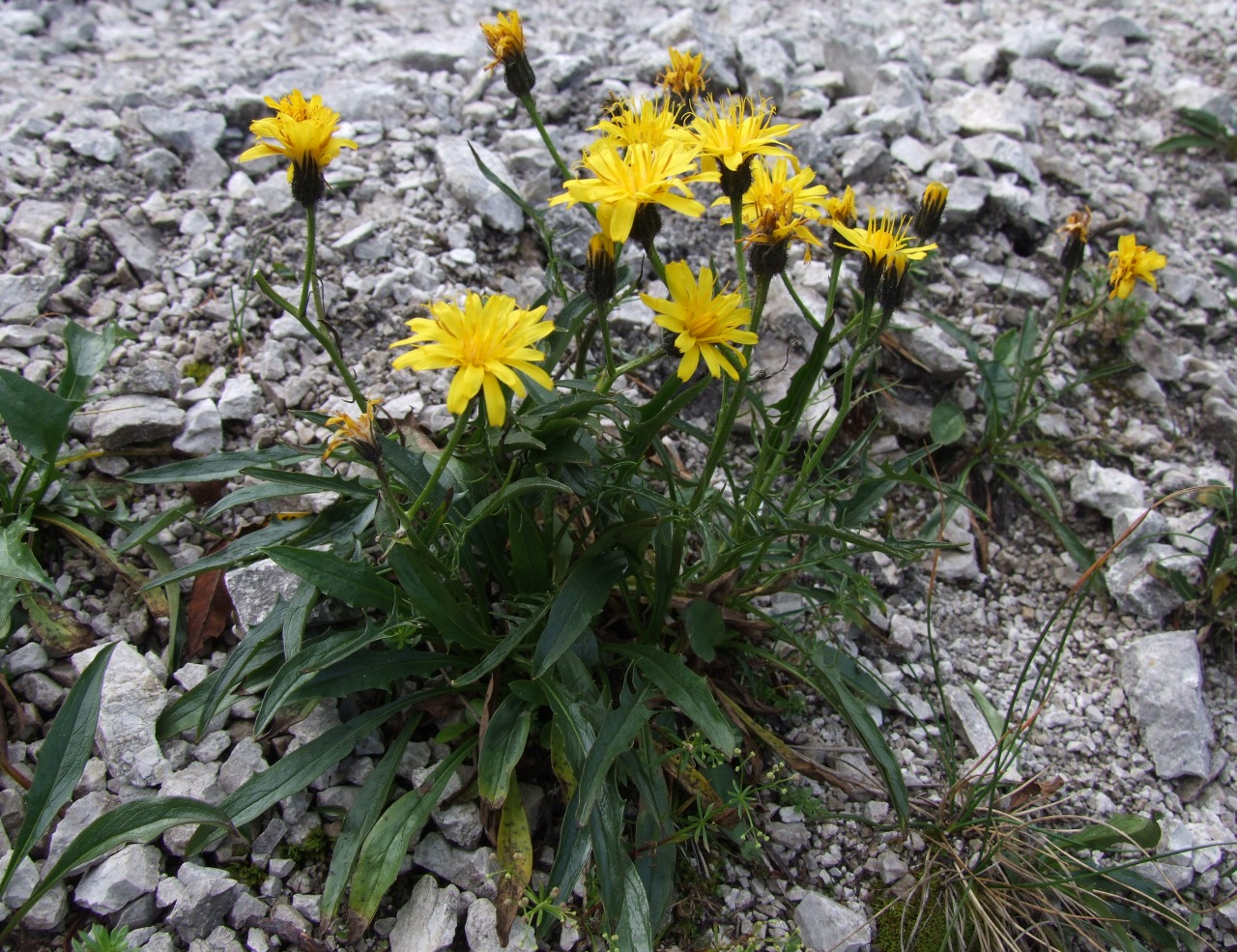
- Crepis jacquinii

Scientific classification
- Kingdom: Plantae
- Clade: Embryophytes
- Clade: Tracheophytes
- Clade: Angiosperms
- Clade: Eudicots
- Clade: Asterids
- Order: Asterales
- Family: Asteraceae
- Subfamily: Cichorioideae
- Tribe: Cichorieae
- Subtribe: Crepidinae
- Genus: Crepis; L.

Species
- about 200, see text

= Crepis =

Genus of flowering plants

Crepis, commonly known in some parts of the world as hawksbeard or hawk's-beard (but not to be confused with the related genus Hieracium with a similar common name), is a genus of annual and perennial flowering plants of the family Asteraceae superficially resembling the dandelion, the most conspicuous difference being that Crepis usually has branching scapes with multiple heads (though solitary heads can occur). The genus name Crepis derives from the Greek krepis, meaning "slipper" or "sandal", possibly in reference to the shape of the fruit.

The genus is distributed throughout the Northern Hemisphere and Africa, and several plants are known as introduced species practically worldwide. The center of diversity is in the Mediterranean.

== Ecology ==
Crepis species are used as food plants by the larvae of some Lepidoptera species including the broad-barred white moth. The fly Tephritis formosa is known to attack the capitula of this plant.

Seeds of Crepis species are an important food source for some bird species.

A fungus, Bremia o, are obligate parasites of Crepis pyrenaica.

== Reproduction ==
Crepis can reproduce sexually or asexually. Crepis is insect-pollinated, typically by bees and other generalist pollinators. Species in this genus are able to produce viable seeds through hybridization. Some of these hybrids (depending on their parent species) can reproduce themselves. As an aster, flowers of Crepis are closely clustered on a capitulum, which is surrounded by petal-like rays. Asexual reproduction (or autogamy) between flowers on the same capitulum has been observed in the genus.

=== Apomixis in Crepis ===
As with several other genera in Asteraceae, multiple Crepis species exhibit apomixis, a form of asexual reproduction where flowers produce clonal seeds without need of fertilization. Unlike sexually-reproducing individuals, which are diploid, apomicts are typically polyploid, with three or more sets of chromosomes. The mechanism of apomixis in Crepis is apospory, wherein diploid tissue arises during meiosis in the ovule. Through apospory, asexual seeds can develop spontaneously in the flowers of a non-apomictic Crepis.

Crepis is part of the Cichorieae tribe in Asteraceae, and is one of several genera of that tribe that exhibits apomixis. The largest group of asexual species is found in North America, and is referred to as the "North American Crepis agamic complex" The agamic complex may have first arisen in the Pliocene, between 5.3 and 2.6 million years ago. At least one Eurasian Crepis species, C. tectorum, has been observed to self-fertilize. Another agamic complex is thought to exist in Asia. Species known to produce apomicts include C. acuminata, C. barbigera, C. intermedia, and C. occidentalis. Polyploid individuals may still be able to carry out sexual reproduction and therefore produce sexual offspring, allowing for the formation of new polyploid hybrids.

=== Reproductive interference ===
Apomictic individuals can prevent reproduction in sexual individuals in multiple ways. Like other apomictic species in Cichorieae, polyploid apomicts may still produce viable pollen that can be transferred to sexual diploids through the normal process of pollination. The mixed apomict-sexual parantage may produce a polyploid hybrid (as has been observed when the apomictic C. barbigera breeds with diploid species C. atribarba). Seed set in the diploid may be reduced, or the pollen may produce hybrid seeds that are unable to reproduce or survive to a normal lifespan. The pollen from the apomict may also prevent germination of pollen from a diploid flower. When pollen from a polyploid individual fertilizes diploid flowers, the resultant seeds are typically polyploid, which lowers the diploid population over generations.

As a result of this reproductive interference, sexual reproduction between diploid plants is reduced when apomicts enter a population. Because diploid species require pollen exchange to reproduce and apomicts can produce seeds by parthenogenesis, apomicts do not suffer any reproductive consequences in a mixed diploid-polyploid population. Meanwhile, the reproductive success of sexually-reproducing diploids falls, resulting in diploids being found more often in populations isolated from apomicts.

=== Evolutionary implications ===
Although apomixis has been considered a "blind alley of evolution", research into apomictic species and species complexes has cast doubt on this. Apomictic clades elsewhere in Cichorieae have demonstrated an ability to "revert" to a sexual mode of reproduction, reducing the risk of extinction through lack of introgression. Speciation in Crepis has occurred through its ability to self-fertilize, hybridize, and form polyploid apomicts.

Apomixis can facilitate range expansion in ways that sexual reproduction does not. Apomicts do not require input of genetic material for another individual, and can therefore produce seeds on maturity without the aid of pollinators. This allows apomictic populations to expand into new geographic areas more rapidly than sexual ones. Because apomixis in Crepis involves multiple ploidy levels, there is sufficient genetic variation for adaptation to novel ecosystems. Additionally, some Crepis apomict species have the ability to hybridize with other apomicts, resulting in genetic recombination alongside parthenogenesis.

== Uses ==
In Crete, Greece, the leaves of Crepis commutata which are called glykosyrida (γλυκοσυρίδα) are eaten raw, boiled, steamed or browned in salads. Another two species on the same island, Crepis vesicaria, called kokkinogoula (κοκκινογούλα), lekanida (λεκανίδα) or prikousa (πρικούσα) and a local variety called maryies (μαργιές) or pikrouses (πικρούσες) have both its leaves and tender shoots eaten boiled by the locals.

== Secondary metabolites ==
The genus Crepis is a rich source of costus lactone-type guaianolides, a class of sesquiterpene lactones.

Phenolics found in Crepis include luteolin-type flavonoids and caffeoyl quinic acid derivatives such as chlorogenic acid and 3,5-dicaffeoylquinic acid. Moreover, Crepis species contain the caffeoyl tartaric acid derivatives caffeoyl tartaric acid and cichoric acid.

== Diversity ==
There are about 200 species in the genus.

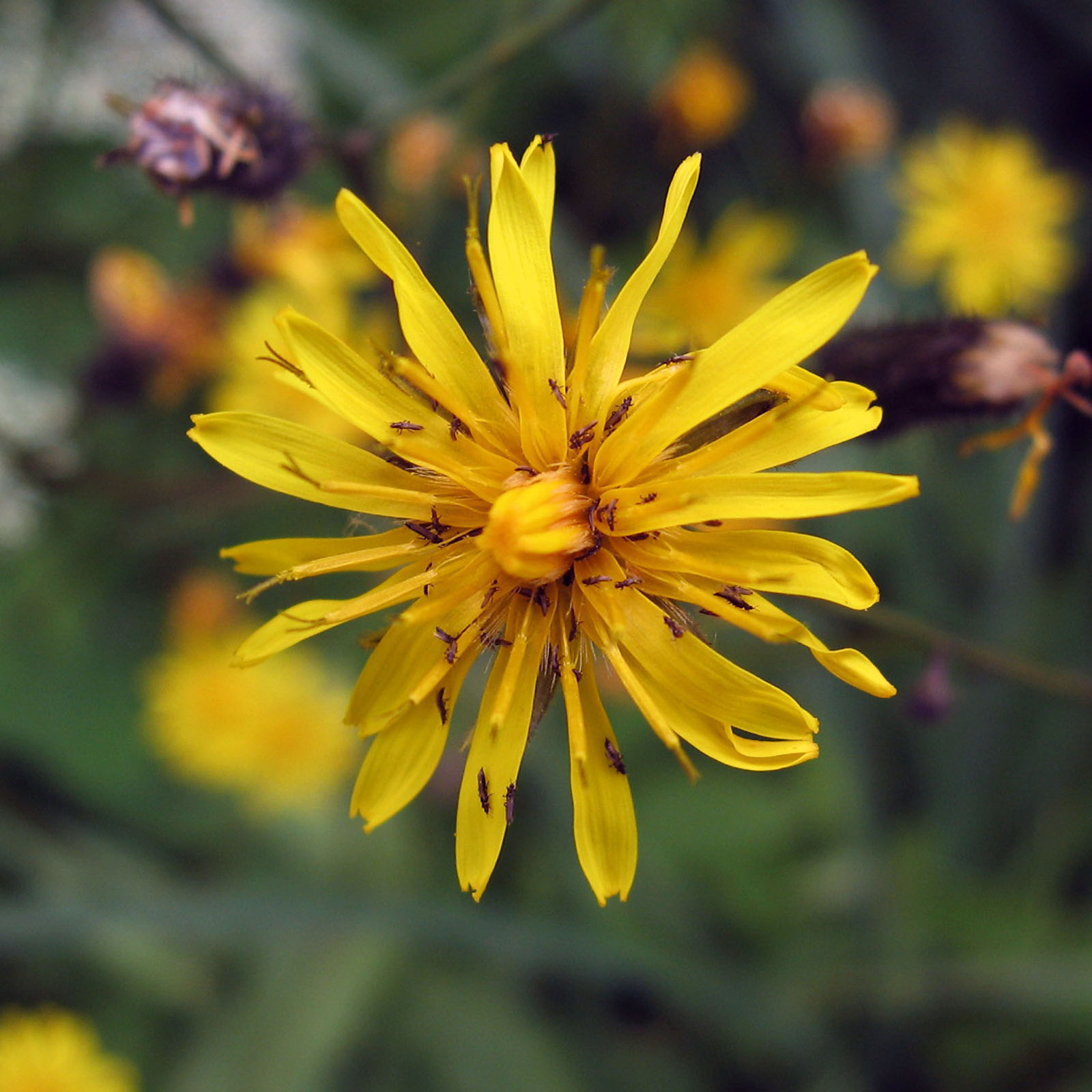
Crepis tectorum

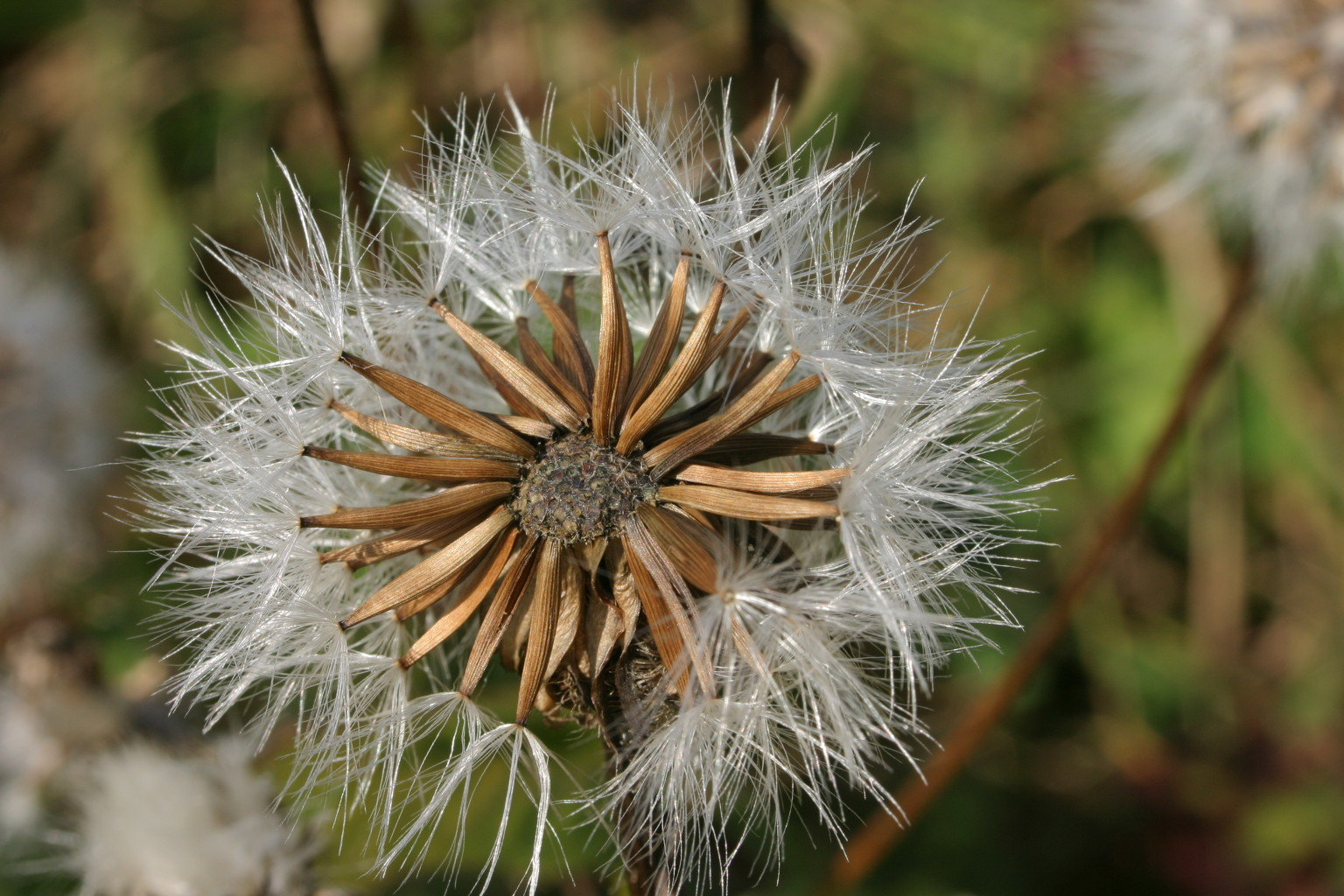
Crepis pyrenaica

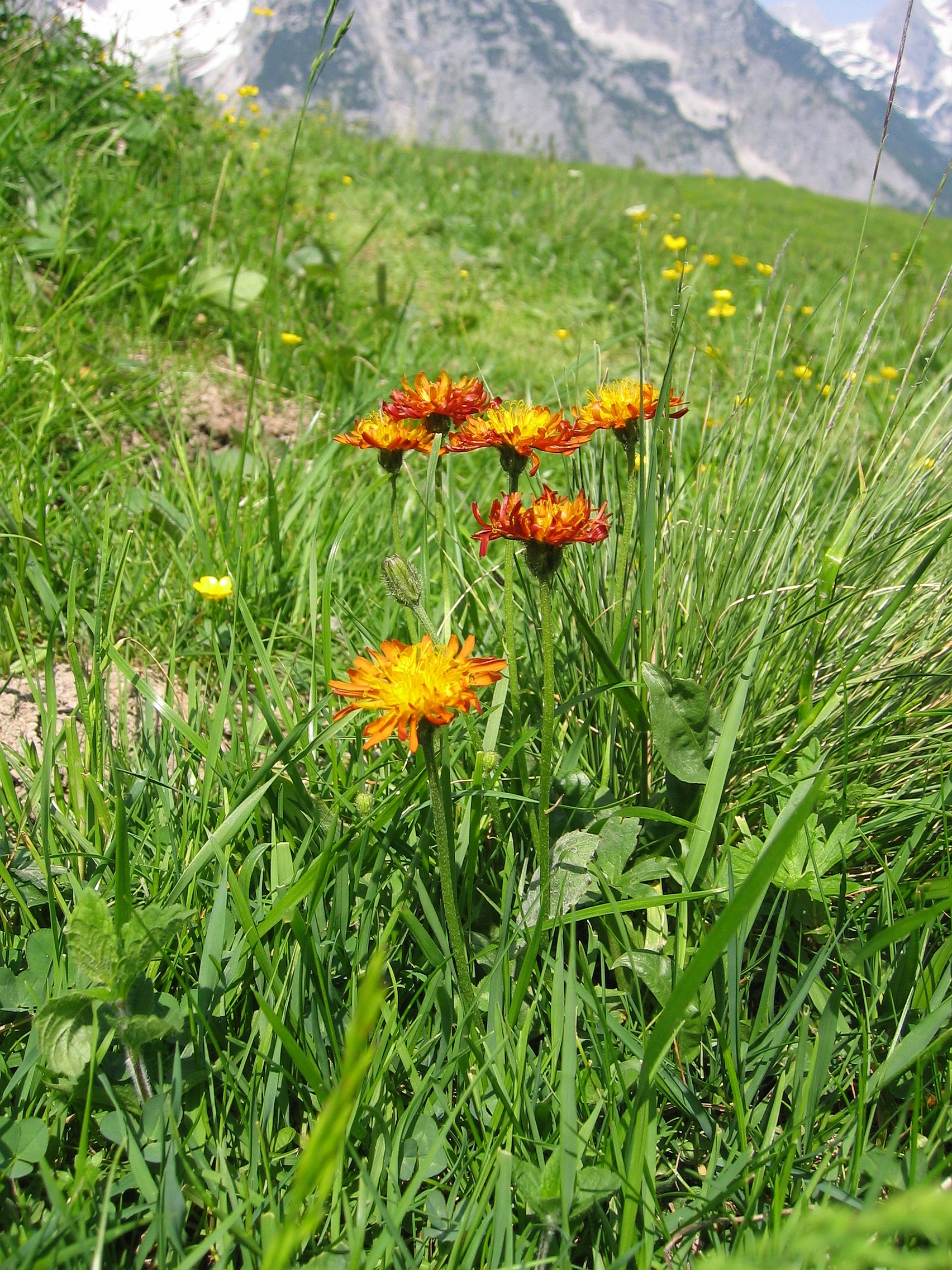
Crepis aurea

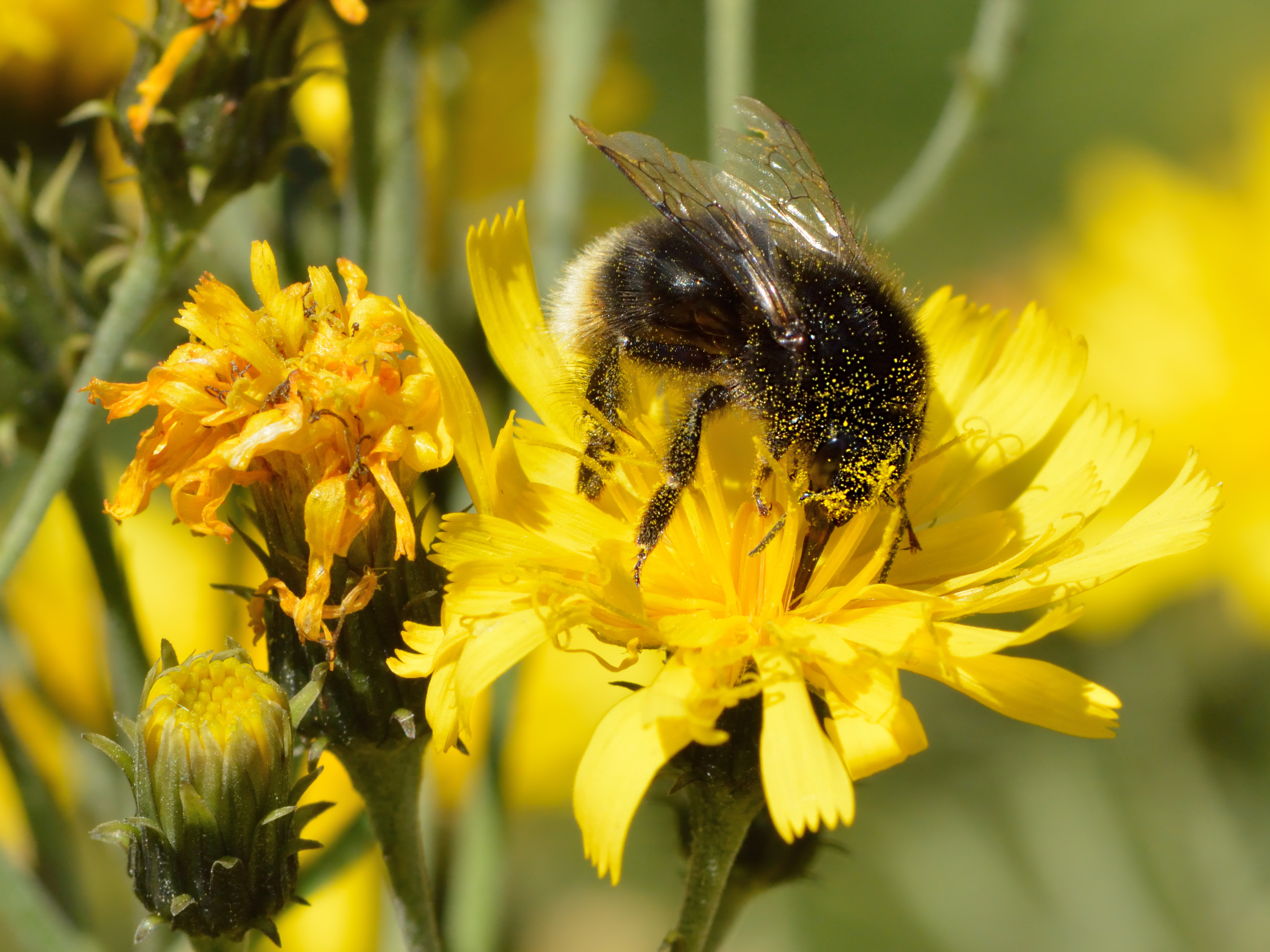
Crepis flowers attracts bumblebees

Species include:

- Crepis acuminata – tapertip hawksbeard, longleaf hawk's-beard
- Crepis alpestris
- Crepis alpina
- Crepis aspera
- Crepis atribarba – dark hawk's-beard, slender hawk's-beard
- Crepis aurea – golden hawk's-beard
- Crepis bakeri – Baker's hawksbeard
- Crepis barbigera – bearded hawk's-beard
- Crepis biennis – rough hawksbeard
- Crepis bungei
- Crepis bursifolia – Italian hawksbit
- Crepis capillaris – smooth hawksbeard, green crepis
- Crepis conyzifolia
- Crepis dioscoridis
- Crepis foetida – stinking hawksbeard, roadside hawk's-beard
- Crepis incana – pink dandelion
- Crepis intermedia – limestone hawksbeard, small-flower hawk's-beard
- Crepis kotschyana
- Crepis micrantha
- Crepis modocensis – Modoc hawksbeard, Siskiyou hawksbeard
- Crepis mollis – northern hawksbeard
- Crepis monticola – mountain hawksbeard
- Crepis nicaeensis – French hawksbeard, Turkish hawksbeard
- Crepis occidentalis – largeflower hawksbeard, gray hawk's-beard, western hawk's-beard
- Crepis palaestina
- Crepis paludosa – marsh hawksbeard
- Crepis pannonica – pasture hawksbeard
- Crepis phoenix
- Crepis pleurocarpa – nakedstem hawksbeard, naked hawk's-beard
- Crepis pontana
- Crepis praemorsa – leafless hawksbeard
- Crepis pulchra – small-flower hawk's-beard
- Crepis pygmaea – pygmy hawksbeard
- Crepis pyrenaica
- Crepis rubra – red hawksbeard, pink hawk's-beard
- Crepis runcinata – fiddleleaf hawksbeard
- Crepis sancta – holy hawksbeard
- Crepis setosa – bristly hawksbeard
- Crepis sibirica
- Crepis sodiroi
- Crepis tectorum – narrow-leaved hawksbeard
- Crepis thompsonii
- Crepis vesicaria – beaked hawksbeard, dandelion hawk's-beard, weedy hawk's-beard
- Crepis zacintha – striped hawksbeard
