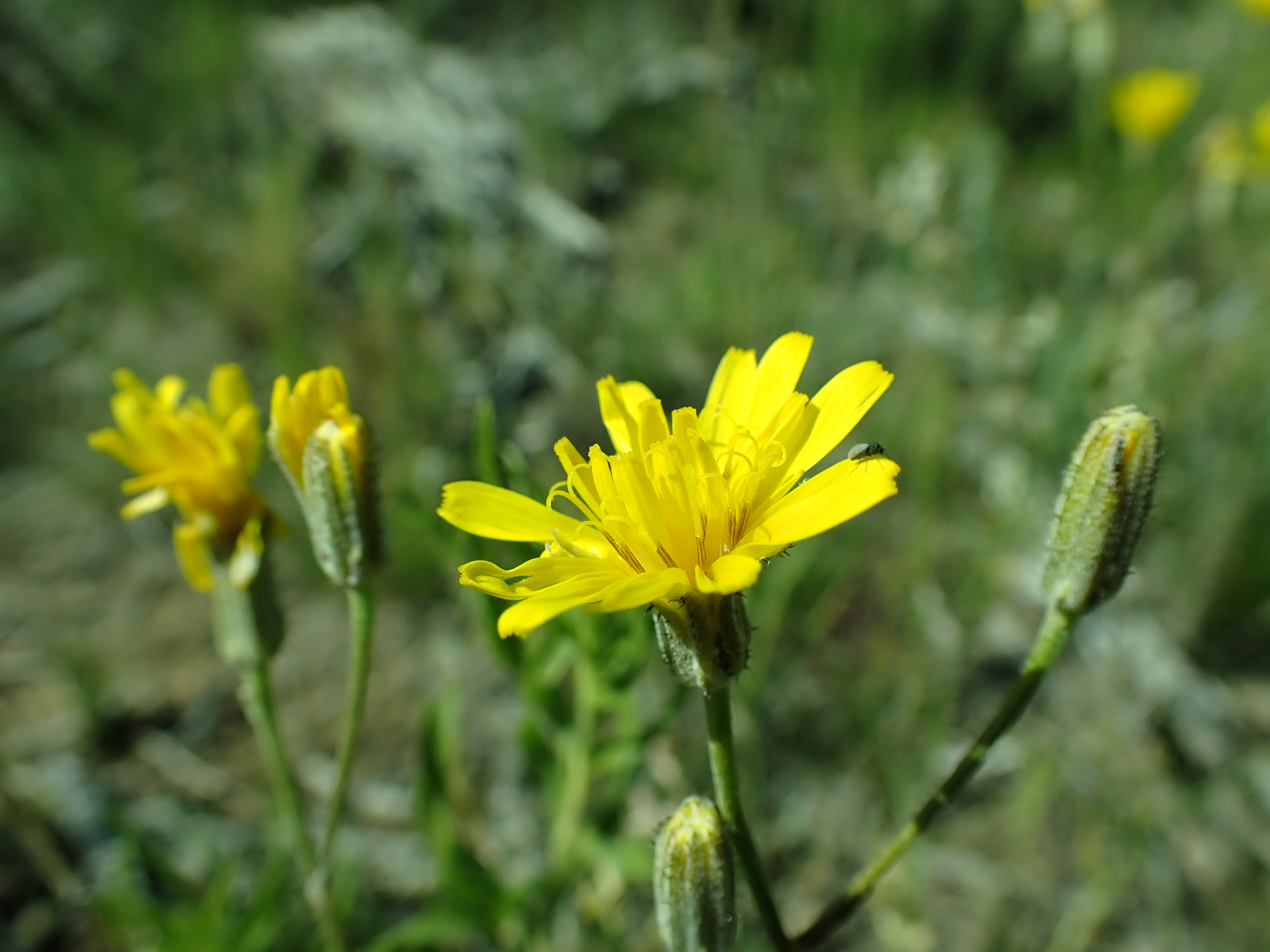

Conservation status
- Secure (NatureServe)

Scientific classification
- Kingdom: Plantae
- Clade: Tracheophytes
- Clade: Angiosperms
- Clade: Eudicots
- Clade: Asterids
- Order: Asterales
- Family: Asteraceae
- Genus: Crepis
- Species: C. atribarba

Binomial name
- Crepis atribarba A.Heller

Synonyms
- Crepis atrabarba A.Heller; Crepis exilis Osterh.; Psilochenia atribarba W.A.Weber

= Crepis atribarba =

Species of flowering plant

Crepis atribarba is a North American species of a flowering plant in the family Asteraceae known by the common names slender hawksbeard and dark hawksbeard. It is native to western Canada and the western United States. It has been found in British Columbia, Utah, Washington, Oregon, Nevada, Idaho, Alberta, Montana, Wyoming, Colorado, Saskatchewan, and Nebraska.

Crepis atribarba grows in many types of mountain and plateau habitat. It is a perennial herb up to 70 cm (28 inches) tall, with a slender taproot and 1 or 2 slender stems. One plant can produce as many as 30 small flower heads, each with 6–35 yellow ray florets but no disc florets.
