= Hecatera fixseni =

Scientific classification
- Domain: Eukaryota
- Kingdom: Animalia
- Phylum: Arthropoda
- Class: Insecta
- Order: Lepidoptera
- Superfamily: Noctuoidea
- Family: Noctuidae
- Genus: Hecatera
- Species: H. fixseni

Binomial name
- Hecatera fixseni (Christoph, 1883)

Synonyms
- Pseudophia fixseni Christoph, 1882; Epipsammia fixseni

Species of moth

Hecatera fixseni is a species of moth of the family Noctuidae. It is found in Egypt, Israel, Armenia, Iran, Turkmenistan, Afghanistan and Pakistan.

Adults are on wing from March to April in Israel, generally, it is a bivoltine species, flying in spring and autumn.
