= List of Crepis species =

List of Crepis species. This plant genus is in the family of Asteraceae.

This is a list of binomial names, with just accepted species and not including synonyms.

Source: Plants of the World Online and IPNI.

== A ==
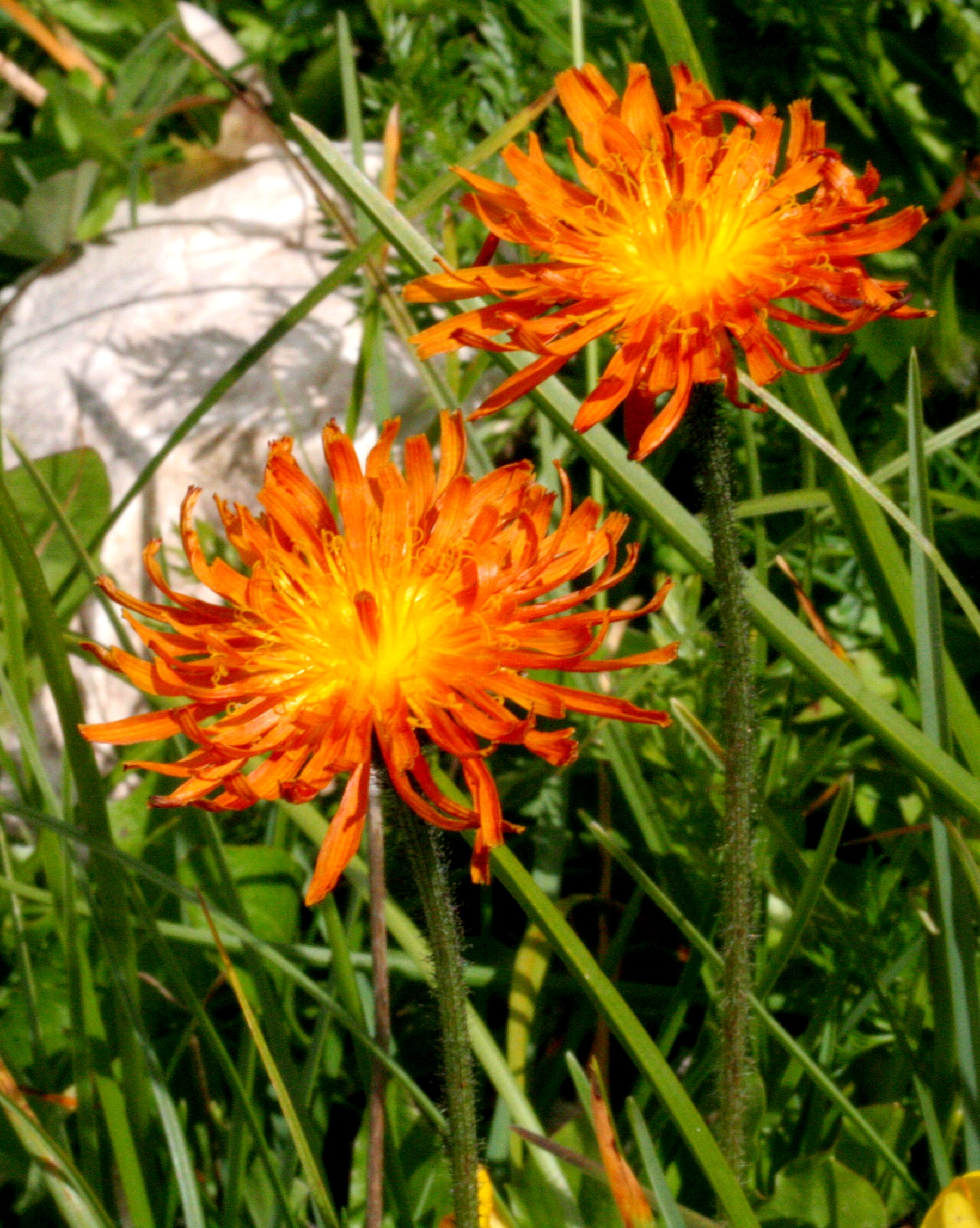
Crepis aurea

- Crepis achyrophoroides Vatke
- Crepis aculeata Boiss.
- Crepis acuminata Nutt.
- Crepis aitchisonii Boiss.
- Crepis albescens Kuvaev & L.S.Demidova
- Crepis albida Vill.
- Crepis alfredii Bornm.
- Crepis alpestris (Jacq.) Tausch
- Crepis alpina L.
- Crepis amanica Babc.
- Crepis amplexifolia Willk.
- Crepis apula (Fiori) Babc.
- Crepis arcuata Kamari & Strid
- Crepis arenaria (Pomel) Pomel
- Crepis armena DC.
- Crepis asadbarensis Bornm. ex Rech.f.
- Crepis aspera L.
- Crepis aspromontana Brullo, Scelsi & Spamp.
- Crepis atheniensis Babc.
- Crepis athoa Boiss.
- Crepis atribarba A.Heller
- Crepis aurea (L.) Cass.
- Crepis auriculifolia Sieber

== B ==
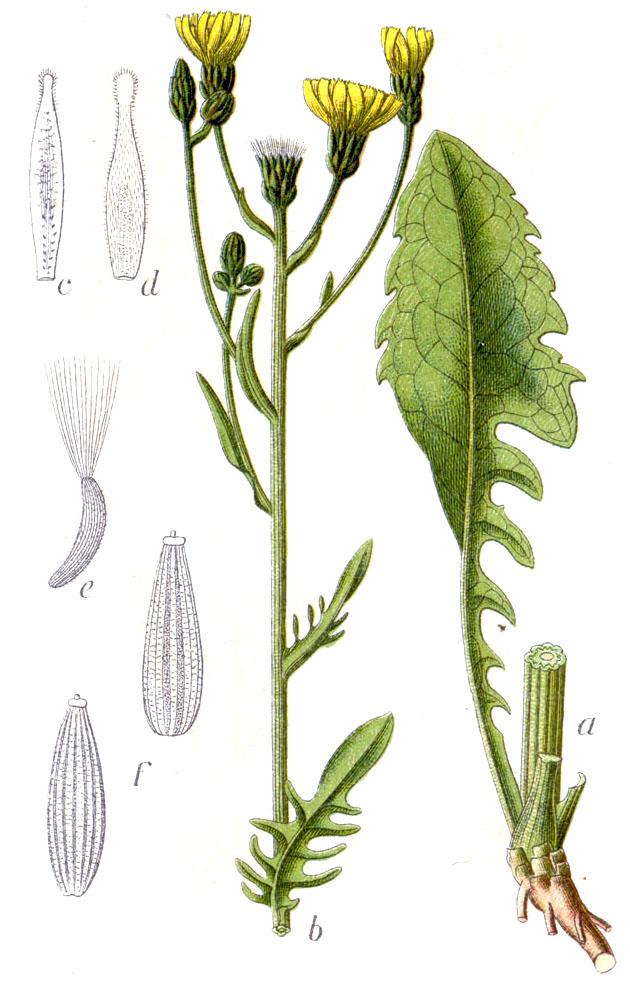
Crepis biennis (type species)

- Crepis bakeri Greene
- Crepis baldaccii Halácsy
- Crepis balliana Babc.
- Crepis barbigera Leiberg
- Crepis bellidifolia Loisel.
- Crepis bermejana M.Talavera, Sánch.Casim.-Sor. & Talavera
- Crepis bertiscea Jáv.
- Crepis biennis L.
- Crepis bithynica Boiss.
- Crepis bodinieri H.Lév.
- Crepis bungei Ledeb. ex DC.
- Crepis bupleurifolia Freyn & Sint.
- Crepis burejensis F.Schmidt
- Crepis bursifolia L.

== C ==
- Crepis calycina (Hoffmanns. & Link) Nyman
- Crepis canariensis (Sch.Bip.) Babc. ex Jenkins
- Crepis capillaris (L.) Wallr.
- Crepis carbonaria Sch.Bip.
- Crepis caucasica C.A.Mey.
- Crepis chloroclada Collett & Hemsl.
- Crepis chondrilloides Jacq.
- Crepis chrysantha (Ledeb.) Turcz.
- Crepis ciliata K.Koch
- Crepis claryi Batt.
- Crepis clausonis (Pomel) Batt. & Trab.
- Crepis commutata (Spreng.) Greuter
- Crepis connexa Babc.
- Crepis conyzifolia (Gouan) A.Kern.
- Crepis coreana (Nakai) Sennikov
- Crepis coronopus Gagnep.
- Crepis crocea (Lam.) Babc.
- Crepis cytherea Kamari
- Crepis czerepanovii Tzvelev

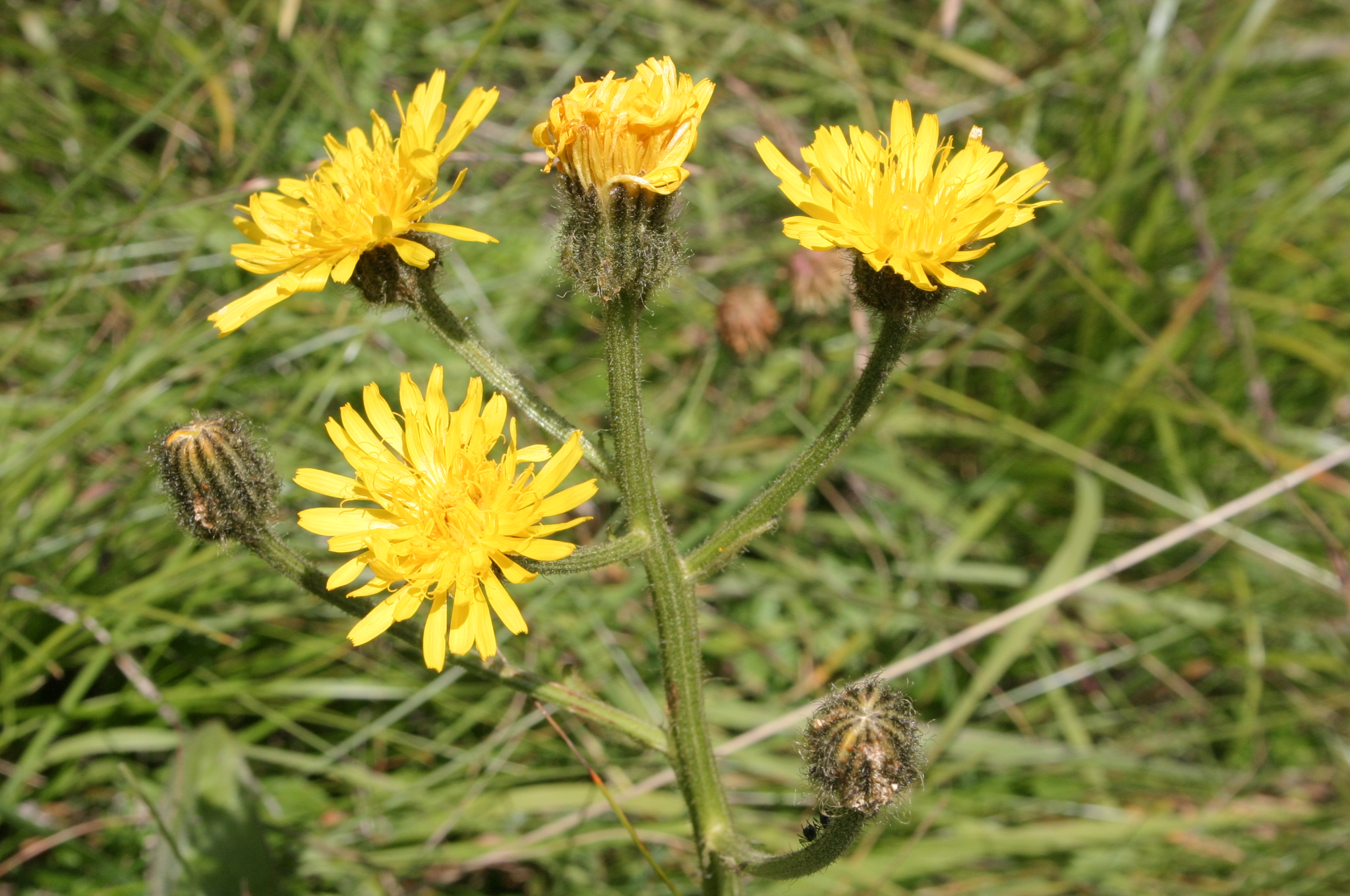
Crepis conyzifolia

== D ==
- Crepis dachhigamensis G.Singh
- Crepis darvazica Krasch.
- Crepis demavendi Bornm.
- Crepis dianthoseris N.Kilian, Enke, Sileshi & Gemeinholzer
- Crepis dioritica Schott & Kotschy ex Boiss.
- Crepis dioscoridis L.
- Crepis divaricata F.Schultz
- Crepis × druceana Murr

== E ==
- Crepis elbrusensis Boiss.
- Crepis elongata Babc.
- Crepis elymaitica Bornm.
- Crepis erythia

== F ==
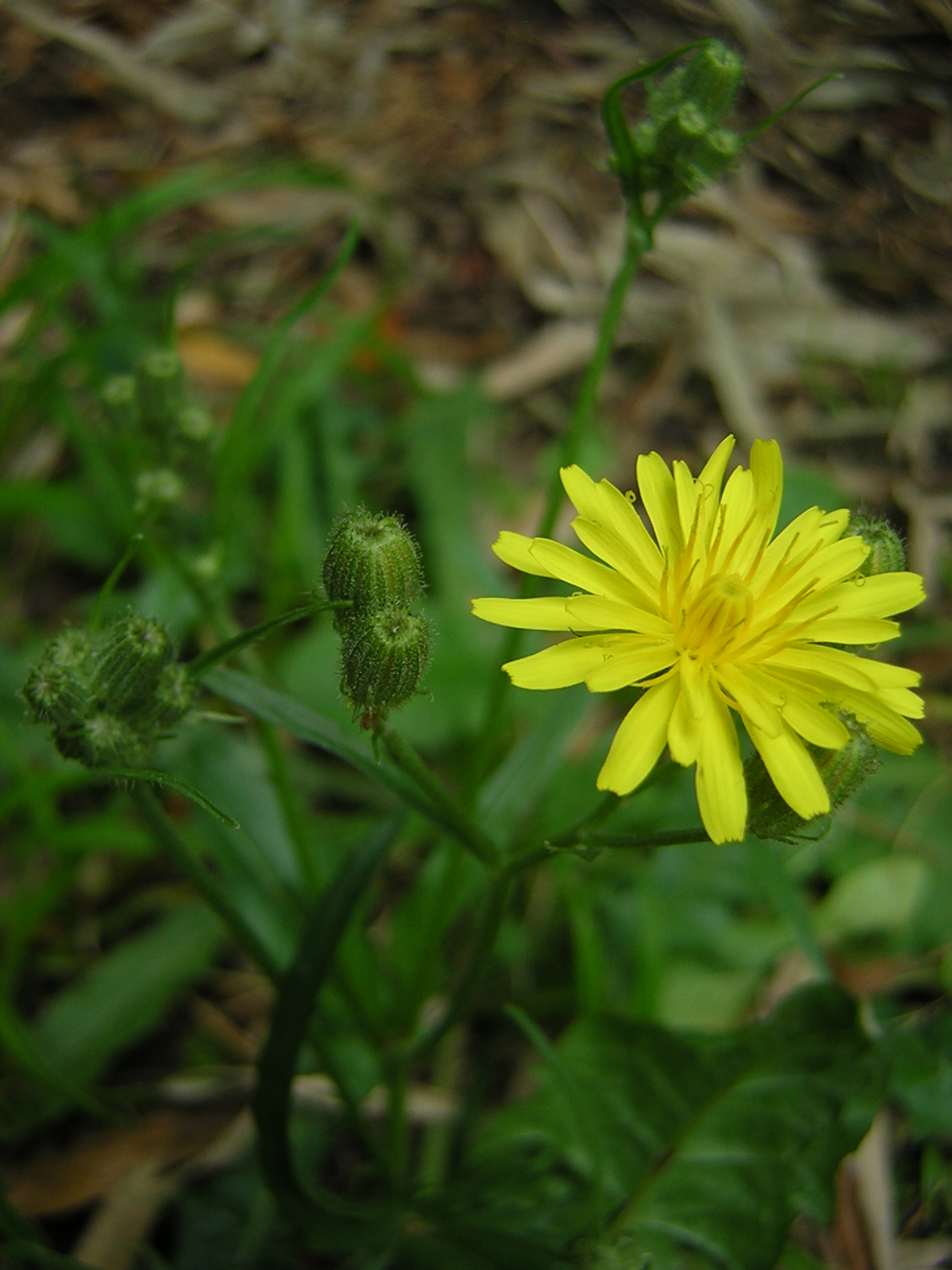
Crepis foetida

- Crepis faureliana Maire
- Crepis foetida L.
- Crepis foliosa Babc.
- Crepis fraasii Sch.Bip.
- Crepis friesii Babc.
- Crepis frigida (Boiss. & Balansa) Babc.
- Crepis froelichiana DC.

== G ==
- Crepis gaubae Bornm.
- Crepis gemicii Yıldırım, Bingöl & Armağan
- Crepis gmelinii (L.) Tausch
- Crepis gossweileri S.Moore
- Crepis granatensis (Willk.) Blanca & Cueto
- Crepis guioliana Babc.
- Crepis gymnopus Koidz.

== H ==
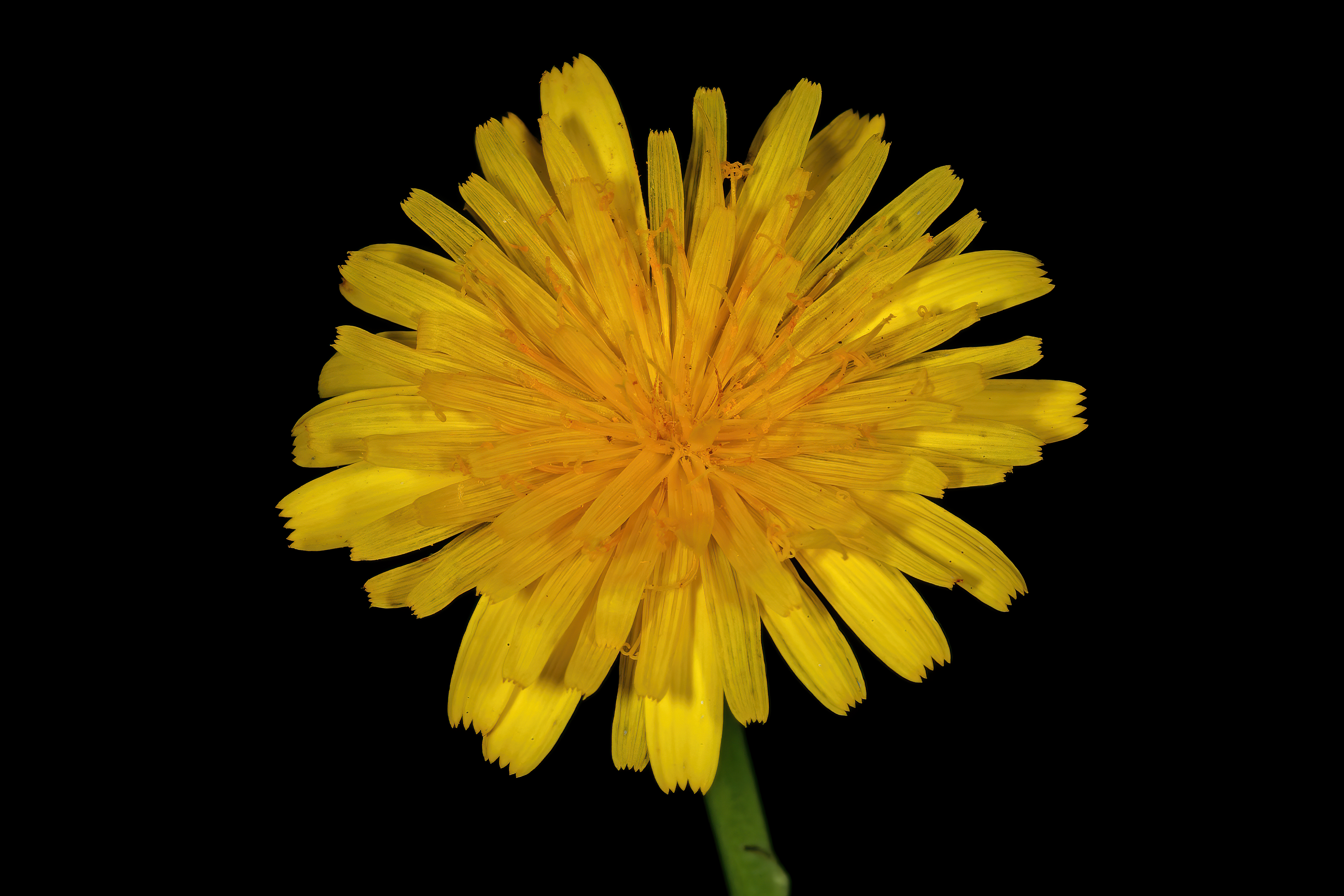
Crepis hypochaeridea

- Crepis hakkarica Lamond
- Crepis heldreichiana (Kuntze) Greuter
- Crepis hellenica Kamari
- Crepis heterotricha DC.
- Crepis hieracioides Ledeb.
- Crepis hierosolymitana Boiss.
- Crepis himalaica Kitam.
- Crepis hokkaidoensis Babc.
- Crepis hookeriana Ball
- Crepis hypochoeridea Thell.

== I/J ==
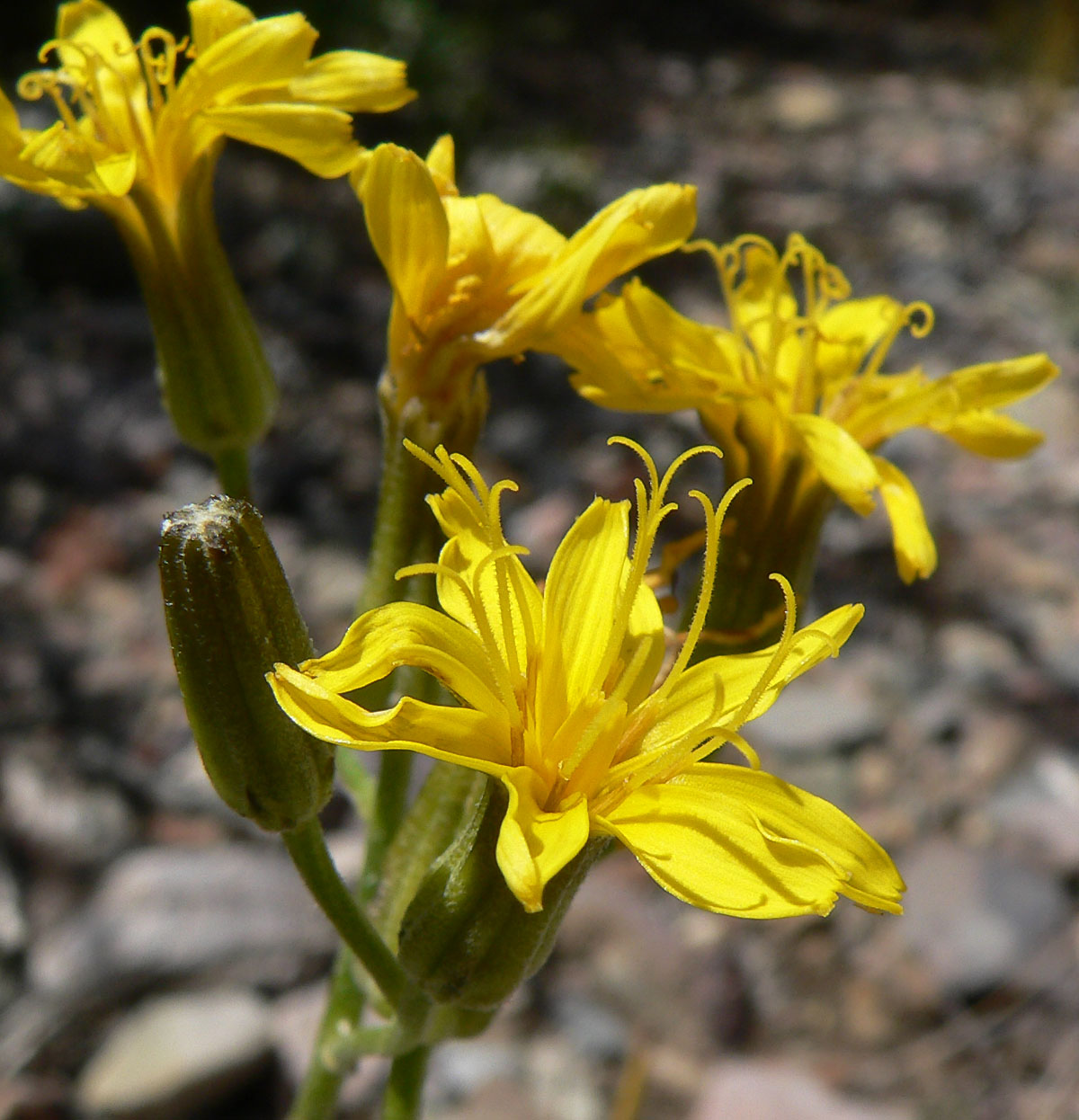
Crepis intermedia

- Crepis incana Sm.
- Crepis insignis Babc.
- Crepis insularis Moris & De Not.
- Crepis intermedia A.Gray
- Crepis jacquinii Tausch
- Crepis juvenalis (Delile) F.W.Schultz

== K ==
- Crepis karakuschensis Czerep.
- Crepis kashmirica Babc.
- Crepis khorassanica Boiss.
- Crepis koelzii Babc.
- Crepis kotschyana (Boiss.) Boiss.
- Crepis kurdica Rech.f.

== L ==
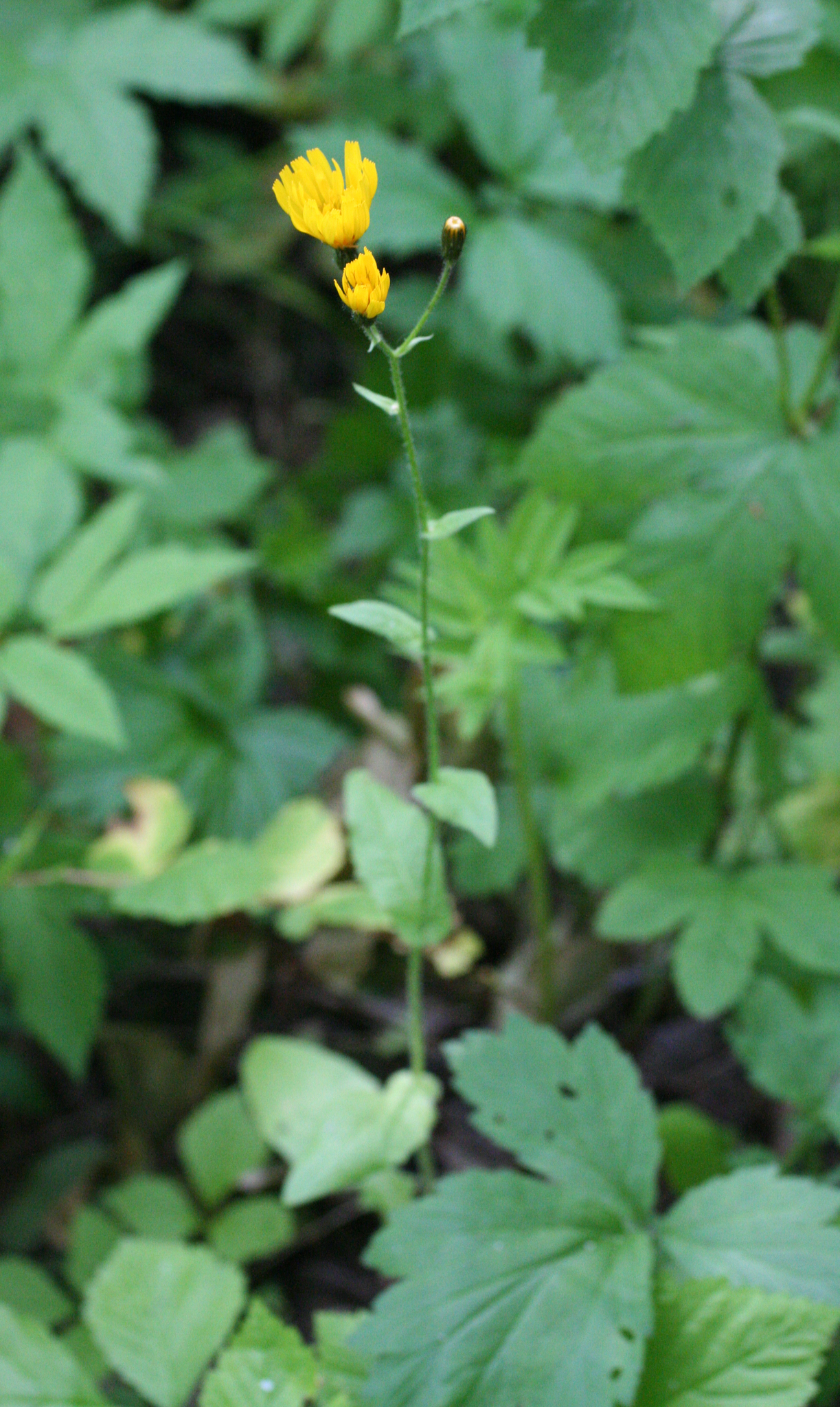
Crepis lyrata

- Crepis lacera Ten.
- Crepis lampsanoides (Gouan) Tausch
- Crepis leontodontoides All.
- Crepis libanotica J.Thiébaut
- Crepis libyca (Pamp.) Babc.
- Crepis lignea (Vaniot) Babc.
- Crepis litardieri Emb.
- Crepis lomonosovae Tzvelev
- Crepis lyrata (L.) Froel.

== M ==
- Crepis macedonica Kitan.
- Crepis macropus Boiss. & Heldr.
- Crepis magellensis F.Conti & Uzunov
- Crepis marschallii F.Schultz
- Crepis merxmuelleri Kamari & Hartvig
- Crepis micrantha Czerep.
- Crepis microtaraxaconoides P.Fourn.
- Crepis miyabei Tatew. & Kitam.
- Crepis modocensis Greene
- Crepis mollis (Jacq.) Asch.
- Crepis monrealensis Pau
- Crepis monticola Coville
- Crepis muhlisii Babc.
- Crepis multicaulis Ledeb.
- Crepis multiflora Sm.

== N ==
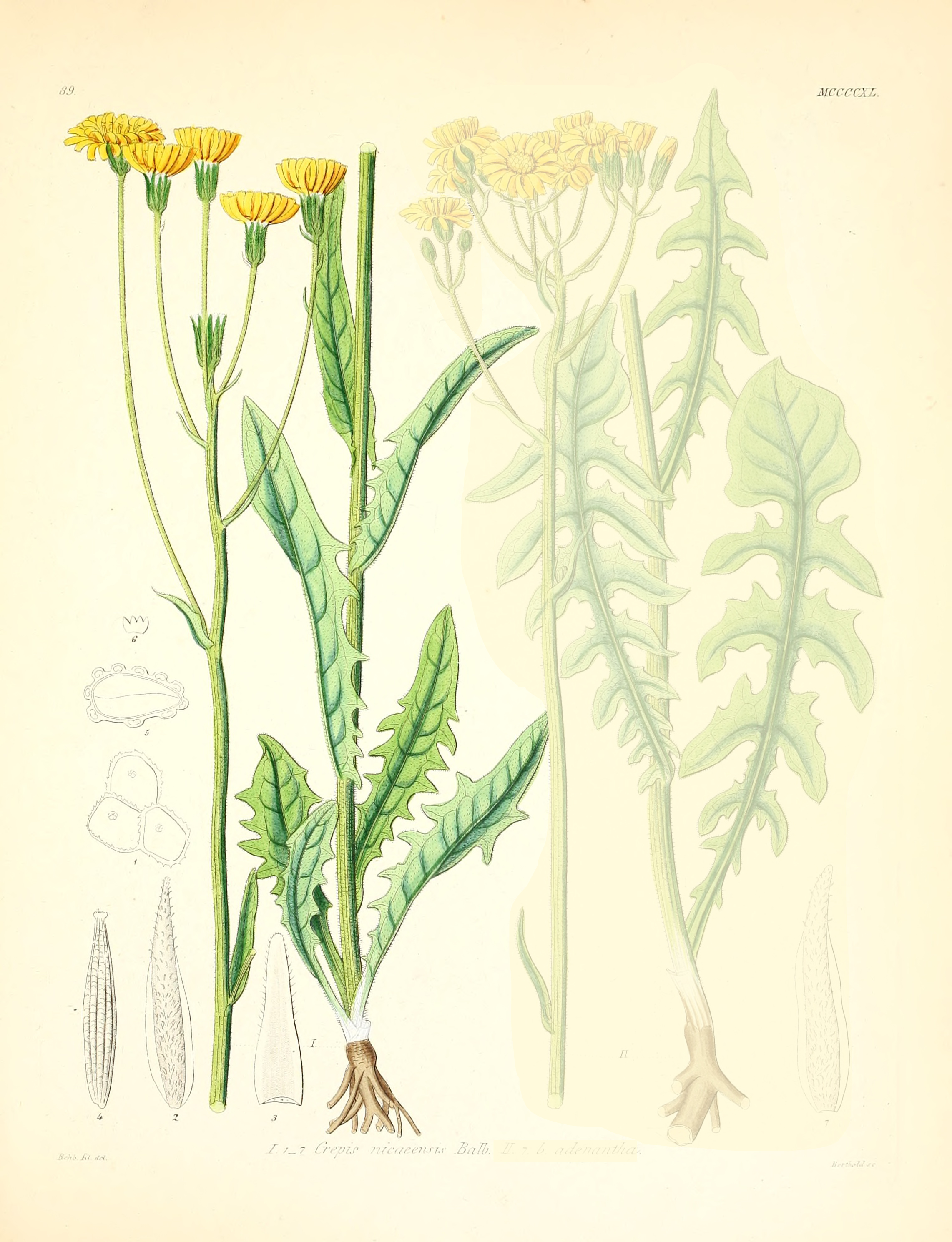
Crepis nicaeensis

- Crepis napifera (Franch.) Babc.
- Crepis neglecta L.
- Crepis newii Oliv. & Hiern
- Crepis nicaeensis Balb.
- Crepis nigrescens Pohle
- Crepis nigricans Viv.
- Crepis noronhaea Babc. ex Jenkins
- Crepis novoana S.Ortiz, X.Soñora & Rodr.Oubiña

== O ==
- Crepis occidentalis Nutt.
- Crepis oporinoides Boiss. ex Froel.
- Crepis oreadis Schrenk

== P ==
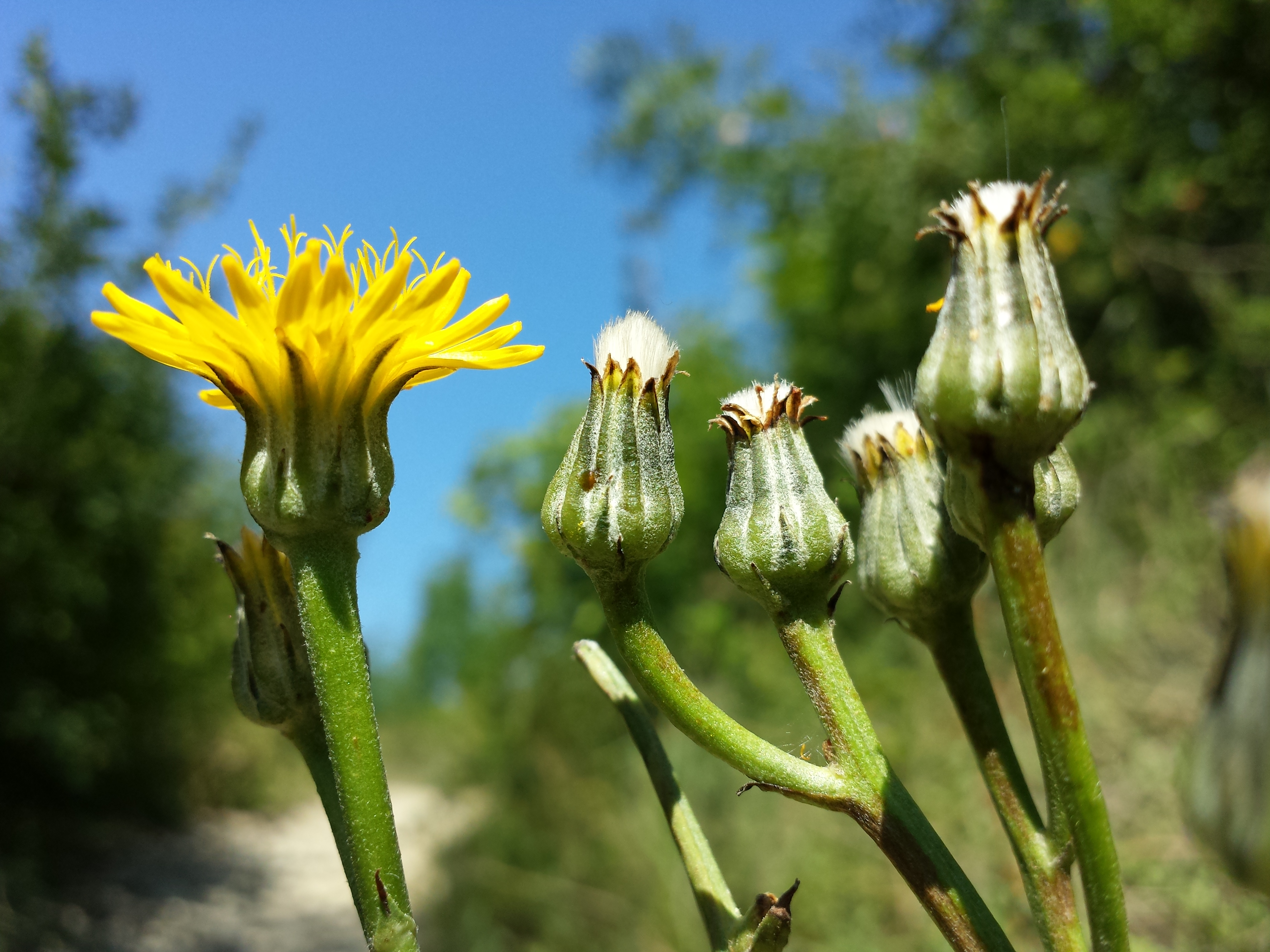
Crepis pannonica

- Crepis palaestina (Boiss.) Bornm.
- Crepis paludosa (L.) Moench
- Crepis paniculas C.Presl
- Crepis pannonica (Jacq.) K.Koch
- Crepis pantocsekii (Vis.) Latzel
- Crepis papposissima Babc.
- Crepis patula Poir.
- Crepis phoenix Dunn
- Crepis pleurocarpa A.Gray
- Crepis pontana (L.) Dalla Torre
- Crepis porrifolia D.Don
- Crepis praemorsa (L.) Tausch
- Crepis pterothecoides Boiss.
- Crepis pulchra L.
- Crepis pulmonariifolia Froel.
- Crepis purpurea (Willd.) M.Bieb.
- Crepis pusilla (Sommier) Merxm.
- Crepis pygmaea L.
- Crepis pyrenaica (L.) Greuter

== Q ==
- Crepis quercifolia Bornm. & Gauba

== R ==
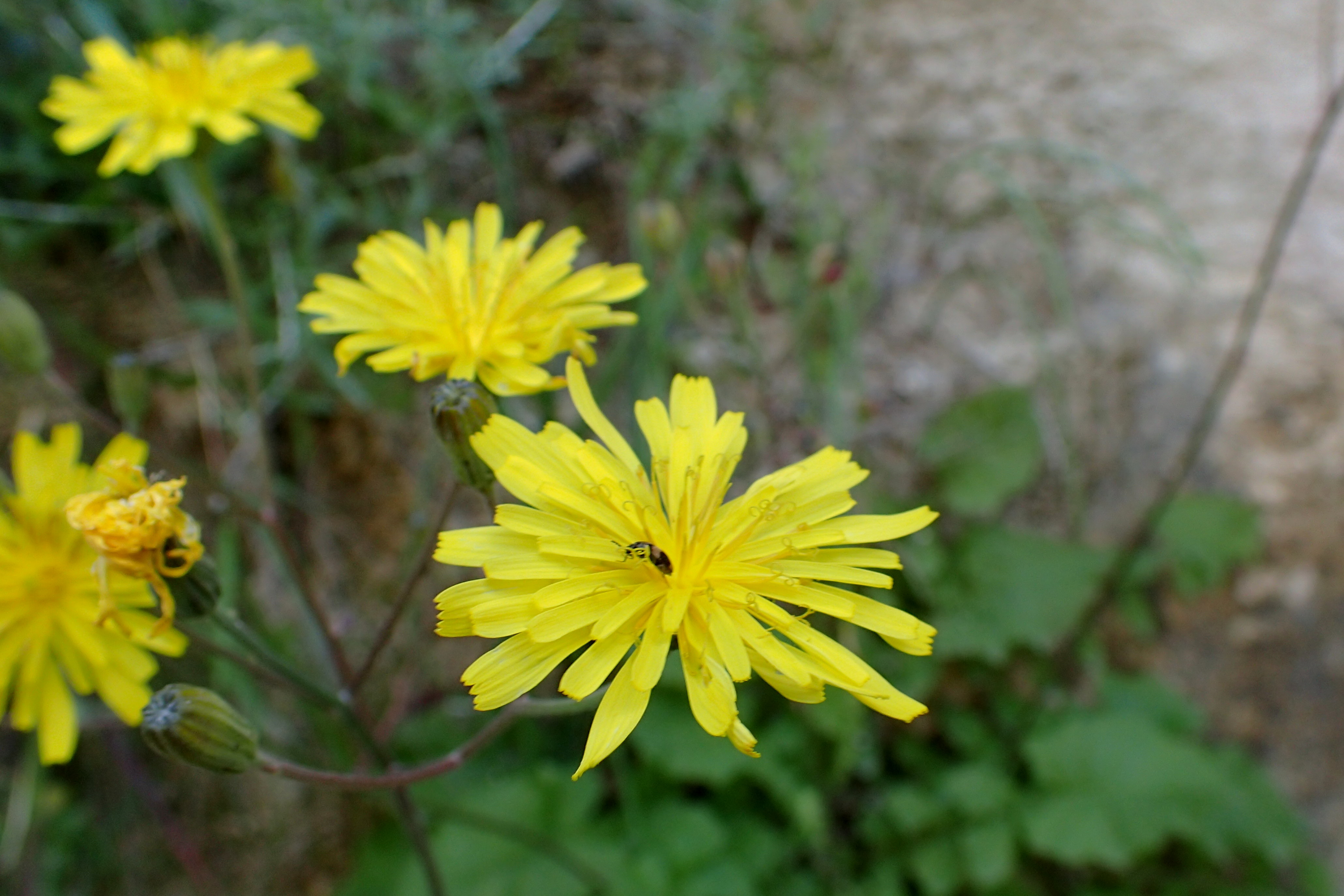
Crepis reuteriana

- Crepis ramosissima d'Urv.
- Crepis reuteriana Boiss.
- Crepis rhaetica Hegetschw.
- Crepis rigescens Diels
- Crepis robertioides Boiss.
- Crepis rubra L.
- Crepis rueppellii Sch.Bip.
- Crepis runcinata (E.James) Torr. & A.Gray

== S ==
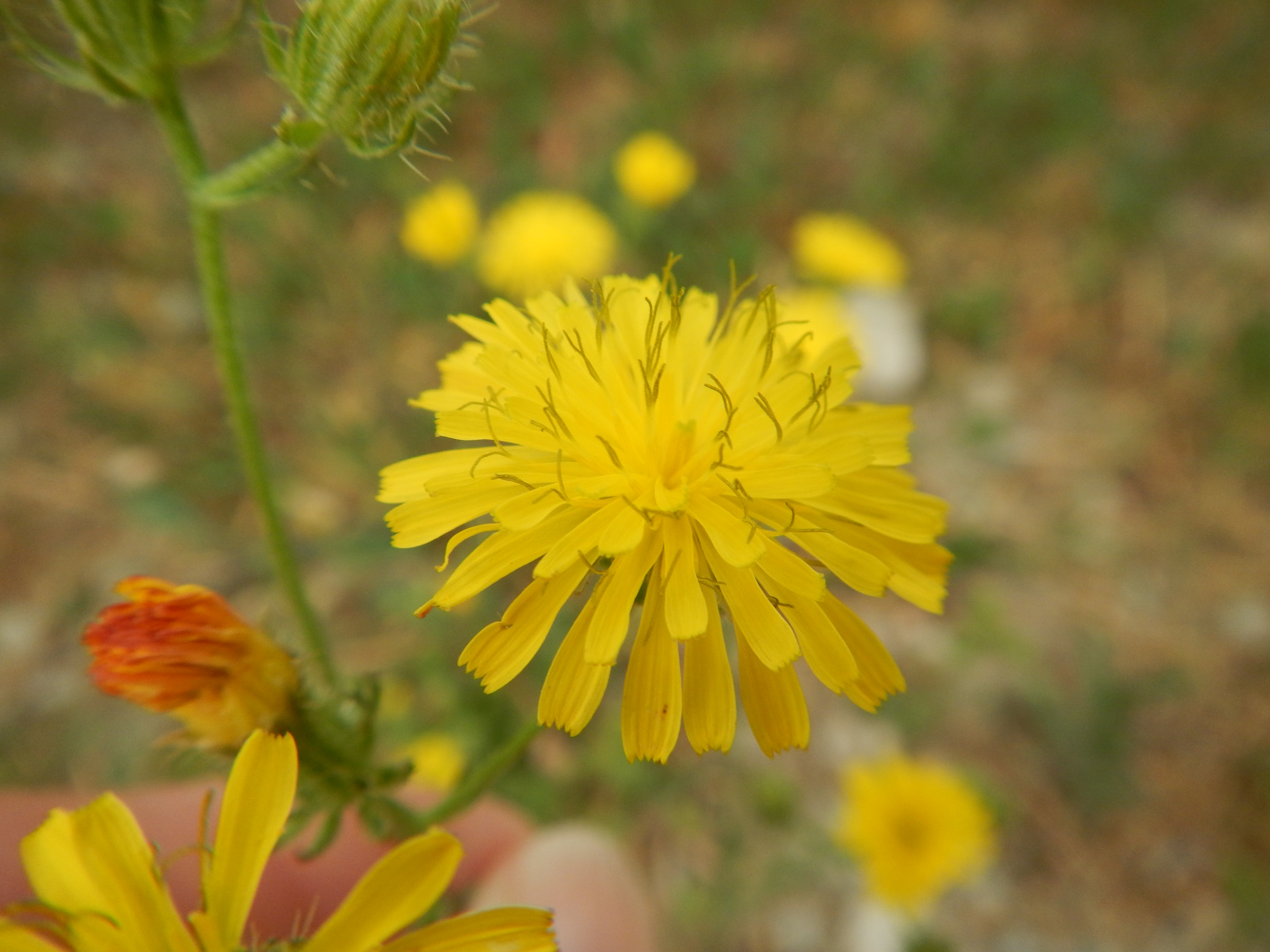
Crepis setosa

- Crepis sahendii Boiss. & Buhse
- Crepis salzmannii Babc.
- Crepis sancta (L.) Bornm.
- Crepis schachtii Babc.
- Crepis schultzii Hochst. ex Oliv.
- Crepis semnanensis Heidarnia & Assadi
- Crepis senecioides Delile
- Crepis setosa Haller f.
- Crepis sibirica L.
- Crepis sibthorpiana Boiss. & Heldr.
- Crepis smyrnaea DC.
- Crepis sonchifolia C.A.Mey.
- Crepis sprengelii Nicotra
- Crepis stojanovii T.Georgiev
- Crepis straussii Bornm. & Bornm.
- Crepis subscaposa Collett & Hemsl.
- Crepis suffreniana Steud.
- Crepis syriaca (Bornm.) Babc. & Navashin

== T ==
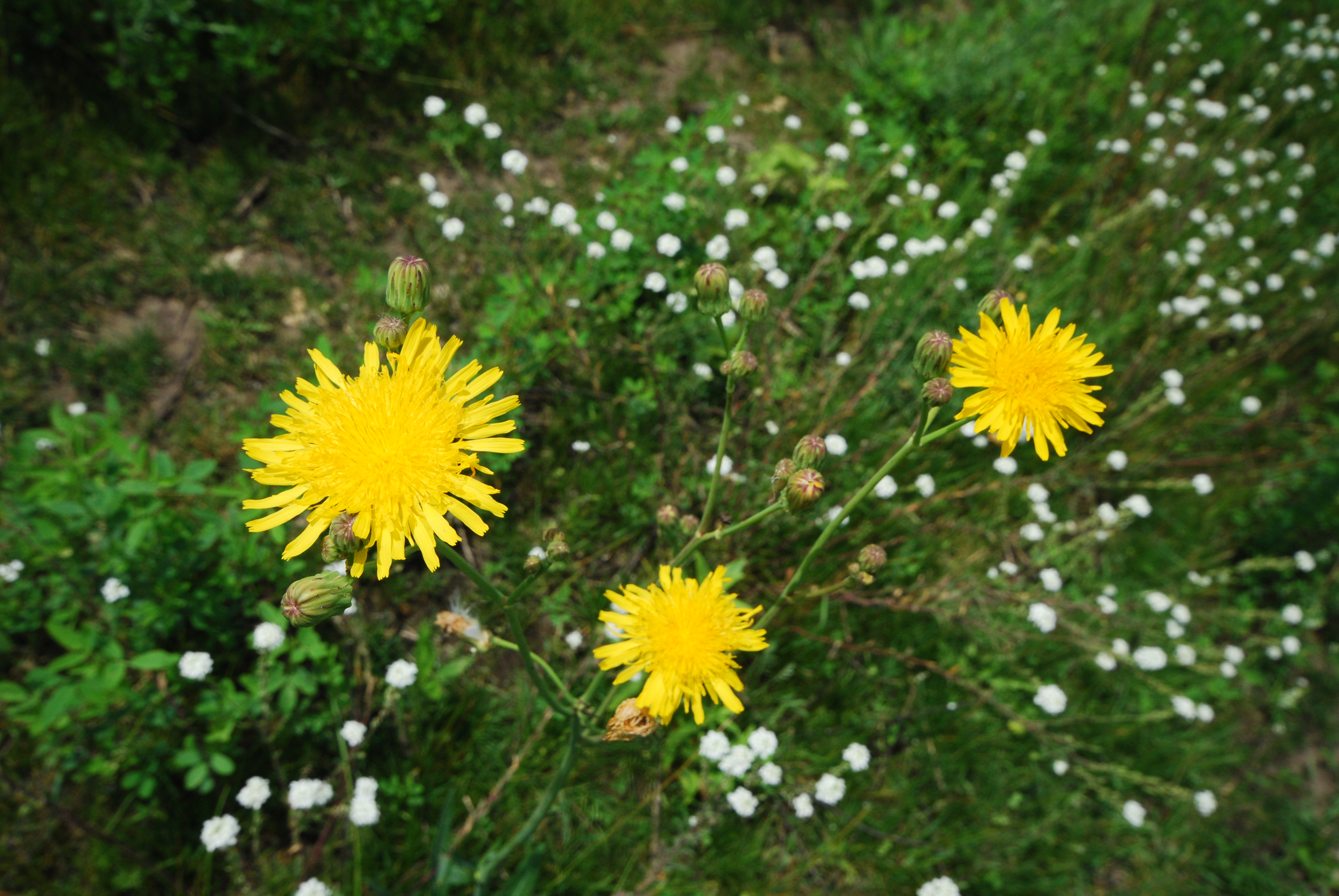
Crepis tectorum

- Crepis tectorum L.
- Crepis tenerrima Sch.Bip. ex Oliv.
- Crepis terglouensis A.Kern.
- Crepis thompsonii Babc.
- Crepis tianshanica C.Shih
- Crepis tingitana Ball
- Crepis triasii (Cambess.) Nyman
- Crepis trichocephala (Krasch.) V.V.Nikitin
- Crepis tungusica Egorova & Sipliv.
- Crepis turcica Degen & Bald.
- Crepis turcomanica Krasch.
- Crepis tybakiensis Vierh.

== U ==
- Crepis urundica Babc.

== V ==
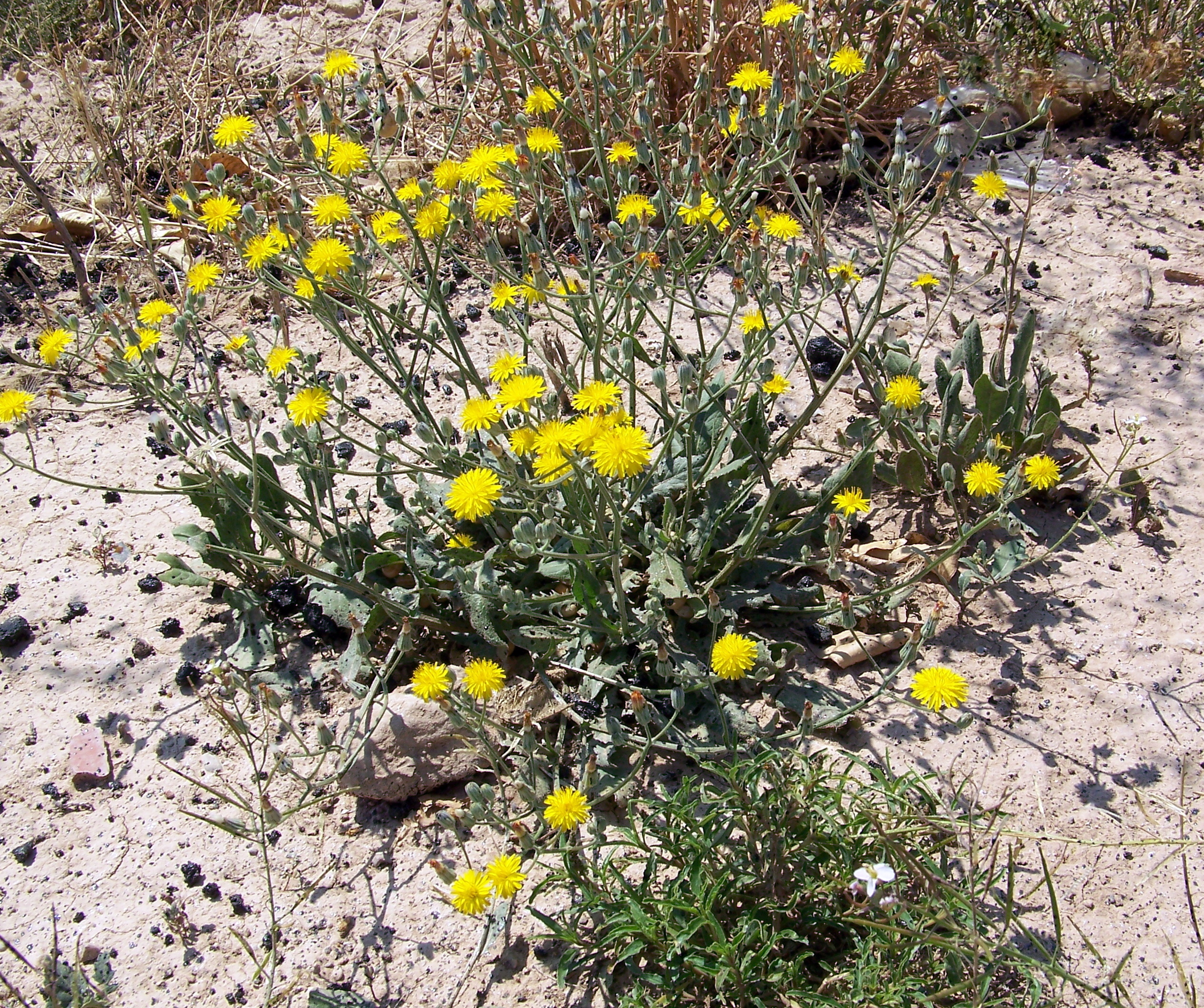
Crepis vesicaria

- Crepis vesicaria L.
- Crepis viscidula Froel.

== W ==
- Crepis willdenowii Czerep.
- Crepis willemetioides Boiss.

== X ==
- Crepis xylorrhiza Sch.Bip. ex Babcock

== Z ==
- Crepis zacintha (L.) Loisel.
