= Marion Elizabeth Stilwell Cave =

American botanist (1904–1995)

Marion Elizabeth Cave
- Born: Marion Elizabeth Stilwell; February 11, 1904; Rochester, NY
- Died: September 26, 1995 (aged 91); California
- Education: A.B. University of Colorado Boulder 1924 A.M.University of Colorado Boulder 1925 PhD University of California, Berkeley 1936
- Known for: Plant Microphotography, Plant embryology
- Spouse: Roy Clinton Cave (m. 1928–1991)
- Awards: Guggenheim Fellowship 1952
- Scientific career
- Fields: Botany, Cytologist, Embryologist, Geneticist
- Workplaces: University of California, Berkeley 1936 – 1943 Office of the Coordinator of Inter-American Affairs 1944–1945 University of California, Berkeley 1945–1981
- Thesis: Cytological and genetical investigations involving Crepis foetida, C. commutata, C. eritreensis, and C. thomsonii
- Doctoral advisor: Ernest Brown Babcock

Marion Elizabeth Cave (11 February 1904 – 26 September 1995) was an American plant embryologist and cytogeneticist. She obtained her PhD from University of California, Berkeley where she pioneered the approach to distinguish plant taxonomy using genetics. She continued this work at Berkeley as a research associate. While there, she would be the first person to count the chromosomes in algae, earn her a Guggenheim fellowship in 1952. In addition to her research, she successfully obtained National Science Foundation funding to create a service that would annually inform how many chromosomes each plant species had to help the field of plant cytology flourish. For her contributions, Volume 33 of Madroño, a genus (Marionella) of Delesseriaceae, and a subgenus (Mscavea) of Echeandia were all dedicated to her.

== Early life and education ==
Cave was born to Anna (née Thompson) and Joseph Stilwell in 1904 in Rochester New York. Shortly thereafter they moved to Colorado where her sister Dorothy Margaret was born in 1907. For undergraduate, she studied at the University of Colorado Boulder. While there, she joined the Chi Omega sorority, was the head of sports on the athletic board, joined the honor society Phi Beta Kappa, and reviewed multiple chapters of "Colorado Plant Life" for Francis Ramaley. In 1925 she graduated cum laude and received her A.B. in biology. Then in 1926 Cave received her A.M. also from University of Colorado Boulder. She then moved to California to attend University of California, Berkeley and pursue her PhD. While there, she joined the biological science honor society Phi sigma and later would become an officer and vice president of the honor society. During her time there, she would be influenced by Priscilla Avery. Under the direction of Ernest Brown Babcock, Cave earned her PhD in genetics in 1936 due to her efforts to apply genetics to distinguish plant taxonomy in Crepis foetida.

== Academic career and research ==
Cave continued to work at the University of California from 1936 to 1943 as a research associate in the botany department. During this time she continued her embryological studies by examining the female gametophyte in Erythronium helenae and Erythronium tuolumnense and she started her 20-year collaboration with Lincoln Constance studying the chromosome numbers of Hydrophyllaceae (waterleaf family). Besides her research endeavors, she served as an instructor of botany at the University of California College of Pharmacy in San Francisco.

From 1944 to 1945 Cave moved to Washington D.C. to work for the Office of the Coordinator of Inter-American Affairs. While there she translated studies on forest legislation from multiple South American companies.

Cave returned to working as a research associate in the botany department of the University of California, Berkeley in 1945. During this time she worked in collaboration with South African phycologist Mary Pocock to pioneer techniques to count the number of chromosomes present in algae using Volvocaceae. For this work she received a Guggenheim Fellowship in 1952 to assist in traveling to South African. She collaborated with Spencer Wharton Brown to discover that pollen tubes in Lilium are attracted to a "preferred zone" of ovules rather than another portion of the ovule. Outside these collaborations she continued to champion the use of embryology in plant taxonomy using Liliaceae as her model system. Besides her research she joined Society of Woman Geographers in 1957 and in 1959 she organized the Ninth International Botanical Congress in Montreal, Canada in 1959. In 1966 she took a sabbatical to visit and collaborate at the University of Concepción in Chile.

== Controversies ==
=== Peony coenocyte: embryo or suspensor ===
In 1957 two Soviet scientists M.S. Yakovlev and M.D. Joffe published in the Indian journal Phytomorphology that the angiosperm Paeonies embryo formed large coenocyte cells during early development. This was striking because closely related angiosperms were not known to form large coenocyte; however, its distantly related cousin the gymnosperms do. This finding questioned the placement of peonies within angiosperms. While leading embryologist and founder of Phytomorphology Panchanan Maheshwari allowed the article to be published, Maheshwari had qualms regarding the veracity of the finding and in turn instructed his student Prem Murgai to replicate the work. In 1959 Murgai concluded the Soviets were wrong. Murgai concluded the large coenocyte cell did not form the embryo but rather the suspensor. Interested in this controversy, Cave recruited graduate students Howard Arnott and Stanton A. Cook to investigate this matter more thoroughly. Ultimately in 1961, this team's findings agreed with Yakovlev and Joffe's initial findings. The coenocyte was the embryo, and this represented an instance of parallel evolution between gymnosperms and peonies. In 1963 while Maheshwari was visiting Berkeley, he attempted to sway Cave's opinion on this matter with his lab's slides using his large presence and big personality. In response Cave called for a young graduate student to explain to Maheshwari his mistake in their interpretation.

=== Image tampering: fake or real ===
Upon completing her 1970 study of Californian Liliaceae chromosomes, Cave submitted her manuscript for review. P. E. Brandham, a staff member from Kew Gardens in London, reviewed her manuscript and claimed the images Cave produce could not be real and that Cave must have drawn on them. The attack on the integrity of her data infuriated Cave and she swiftly informed the reviewer that they were mistaken.

== Works ==
- A Fourth New Species of Nicotiana from Peru (1935)
- Cytological and Genetical Investigations Involving Crepis foetida, C. Commutata, C. Eritreënsis, and C. Thomsonii (1936)
- A study of Intra- and Interspecific Relations of Crepis foetida (1938)
- Megasporogenesis and Embryo Sac Development in Calochortus (1941)
- Development of the female gametophyte in Erythronium helenae and Erythronium tuolumnense (1942)
- Development of the Macrogametophyte of Miersia Chilensis (1942)
- Alteration of Chromosome Number in Miersia chilensis (1943)
- Curare in the Amazon Basin (1944)
- Forest legislation in Honduras (1945)
- Forest legislation in Venezuela (1945)
- Forest legislation in Paraguay (1945)
- Sporogenesis and Embryo Sac Development of Hesperocallis and Leucocrinum in Relation to their Systematic Position (1948)
- Karyological Studies in the Volvocaceae (1951)
- Induced Dominant Lethality in Lilium (1953)
- Plant Genera, Their Nature and Definition (1953)
- The Detection and Nature of Dominant Lethals in Lilium. I. Effects of X Rays on the Heritable Component and Functional Ability of the Pollen Grain (1954)
- The Detection and Nature of Dominant Lethals in Lilium. II. Cytological Abnormalities in Ovules after Pollen Irradiation (1954)
- The Variable Chromosome Number in Astrephomene gubernaculifera (1956)
- The Detection and Nature of Dominant Lethals in Lilium. III. Rates of Early Embryogeny in Normal and Lethal Ovules (1957)
- Chromosome Numbers in the Hydrophyllaceae (1942, 1944, 1947, 1950, 1959)
- Ontogeny of the Inflorescence and the Flower in Drimys winteri Var. Chilensis (1959)
- Embryogeny in the California Peonies with Reference to Their Taxonomic Position (1961)
- Chromosome numbers in Crossosoma (1963)
- Cytological observations on some genera of the Agavoideae (1964)
- Embryology of Blandfordia nobilis Smith (Liliaceae), with Special Reference to Its Taxonomic Position (1964)
- The chromosomes of Scoliopus (Liliaceae) (1966)
- Chromosomes of the California Liliaceae (1970)
- Chromosome Numbers and Relationships in Annoniflorae (1971)
- Chromosome number in Muilla maritima (Torr.) S. Wats (1974)
- Geography of pollen and chromosomal heteromorphism in Leucocrinum montanum (Lilliaceae) (1975)

== Personal life ==
She married Roy Clinton Cave in 1928 in California. They lived together briefly in St. Louis, Missouri. They moved back to California in 1935. They moved to Washington D.C. from 1944 to 1945 so that both could work for Office of the Coordinator of Inter-American Affairs. Afterwards, they moved back to California. Outside of work she was interested in sewing, traveling, reading, and gardening. She was survived by her sister's daughter Joan Litten.

== Legacy ==
Despite not having more space to work than a graduate student, as a research associate Cave was invested in teaching graduate students the plant photomicrography and embryology. Some of her students included Howard Arnott, Sherwin Carlquist, Stanton A. Cook, Florence Signaigo Wagner, and Warren H. Wagner. In addition, her opinion and experiences on cytological squash techniques were requested during the formation of a Plant Microtechnique Manual. Towards the end of her time at Berkeley she became the photographer for the botany department. From 1952 to 1981 she took 372 photographs.

Outside of Berkeley she provided samples to help Rosalie Wunderlich of the University of Vienna resume her research program after World War II. To help the plant cytological community, she secured funding from the National Science Foundation to create an annual compilation of all the plant species within known chromosome numbers. She was the initial editor of "Index to Plant Chromosome Numbers" from 1956 to 1964 and then became associate editor from 1964 to 1974.

== Awards and achievements ==
- Guggenheim Fellowship (1952)
- Volume 33 of Madroño (journal) dedicated to her
- A genus (Marionella) of Delesseriaceae was dedicated to her by Florence Signaigo Wagner
- A subgenus (Mscavea) of Echeandia was dedicated to her by Robert William Cruden
