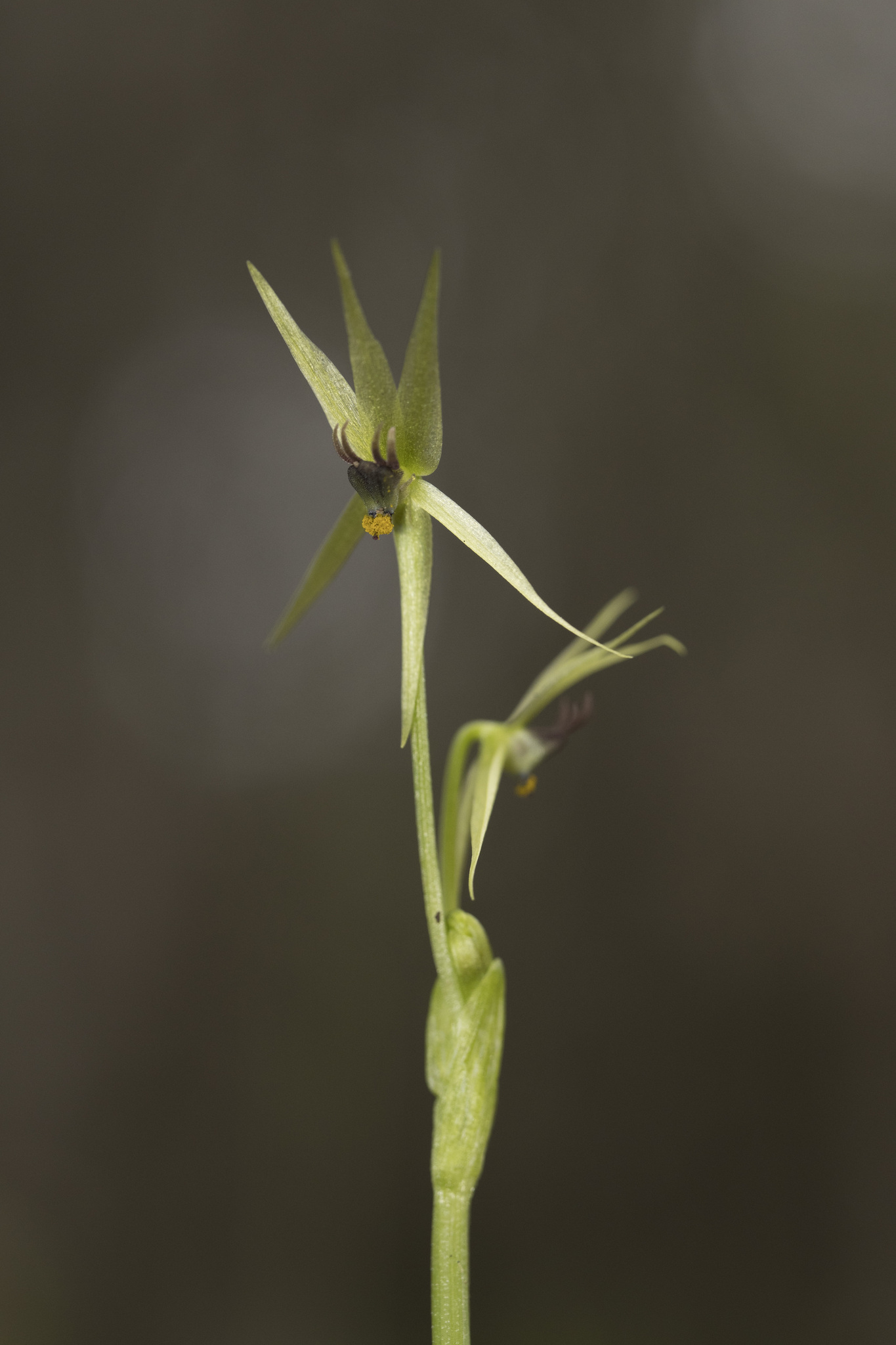

Scientific classification
- Kingdom: Plantae
- Clade: Tracheophytes
- Clade: Angiosperms
- Clade: Monocots
- Order: Asparagales
- Family: Amaryllidaceae
- Subfamily: Allioideae
- Genus: Miersia
- Species: M. chilensis

Binomial name
- Miersia chilensis Lindl.

= Miersia chilensis =

Species of plant

Miersia chilensis is a species of flowering plant in the family Amaryllidaceae. It is a perennial herb endemic to Chile, distributed between the Coquimbo and Araucanía regions. It is a diploid species with a karyotype of 2n=20, which is larger than other species of the genus (2n=12).
