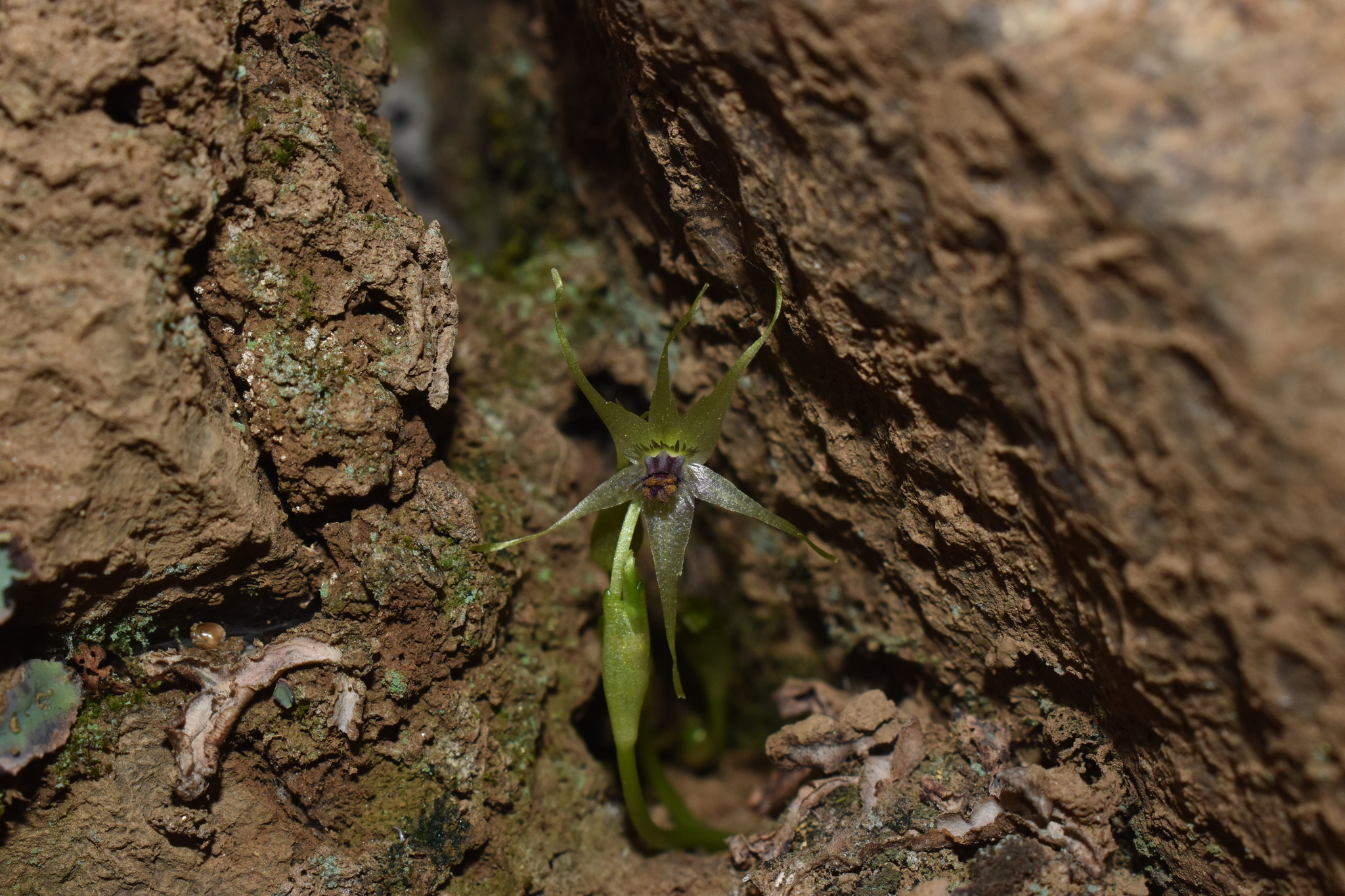

Scientific classification
- Kingdom: Plantae
- Clade: Tracheophytes
- Clade: Angiosperms
- Clade: Monocots
- Order: Asparagales
- Family: Amaryllidaceae
- Subfamily: Allioideae
- Genus: Miersia
- Species: M. stellata

Binomial name
- Miersia stellata C.Cuevas & Nic.García

= Miersia stellata =

Species of plant

Miersia stellata is a species of flowering plant in the family Amaryllidaceae. It is a bulbous geophyte endemic to central Chile.
