= Rosalie Auguste Emma Wunderlich =

Austrian botanist and embryologist

- Born: 10 September 1908; Vienna, Austria
- Died: 18 December 1990 (aged 82); Vienna, Austria
- Scientific career
- Fields: Botany, embryology

Rosalie Auguste Emma Wunderlich (10 September 1907 in Vienna – 18 December 1990 in Vienna) was an Austrian botanist and embryologist at the University of Vienna.

== Life ==
Wunderlich was born on September 10, 1907, in Vienna. In 1926 she passed her Matura, an advanced degree, at the Gymnasium (school), or teacher training college, in Vienna. After she passed the supplementary Matura, she studied botany at the University of Vienna. She became a doctoral student at the Botanical Institute of the University of Vienna and worked closely with Karl Schnarf. Despite completed her dissertation proposal, she did not register for the examination because she had already been back to work as an elementary or special schoolteacher for financial reasons. However, she remained a freelancer at the Botanical Institute of the University of Vienna until her death. In addition to practical research work, she worked on systematic embryology through thorough literature studies and her own publications. Her work was disrupted as a result of World War II. She was able to resume her research because Marion S. Cave provided her some samples. Thanks to her specialist knowledge, she was able to elucidate Gregor Mendel's motivation for carrying out his crossing experiments. She found the key to this in a footnote of his research report.

== Publications ==
- Vergleichende Untersuchungen von Pollenkörnern einiger Liliaceen und Amaryllidaceen, (1936).
- Zur vergleichenden Embryologie der Liliaceae-Scilloideae (1937).
- Ein künstlich bestäubter Fruchtknoten von Yucca filamentosa(1938).
- Zur vergleichenden Embryologie der Liliaceae-Asphodeloideae (1939).
- Die Agavaceae HUTCHINSONs im Lichte ihrer Embryologie, ihres Gynözeum-, Staubblatt- und Blattbaues (1950).
- Über das Antherentapetum mit besonderer Berücksichtigung seiner Kernzahl (1954).
- Zur Frage der Phylogenie der Endospermtypen bei den Angiospermen (1959).
- The Pogostemoneae - a debatable group of Labiatae (1963).
- Zur Deutung der eigenartigen Embryoentwicklung von Paeonia (1966).
- Ein Vorschlag zu einer natürlichen Gliederung der Labiaten auf Grund der Pollenkörner, der Samenentwicklung und des reifen Samens (1967).
- Some remarks on the taxonomic significance of the seed coat. Phytomorphology 17: 301-311 (1968).
- Die systematische Stellung von Theligonum (1971).
- Der wissenschaftliche Streit über die Entstehung des Embryos der Blütenpflanzen im zweiten Viertel des 19. Jahrhunderts (bis 1856) und MENDELS "Versuche über Pflanzenhybriden". Acta Musei Moraviae, Sci. nat., 67 (Folia Mendeliana 17): 225-242 (1982).
- The scientific controversy about the origin of the embryo of phanerogams in the second quarter of the 19th Century (up to 1856) and MENDEL's "Versuche über Pflanzenhybriden". In: Gregor MENDEL and the Foundation of Genetics (eds. V. Orel and A. Matalova), proceedings of the symposium "The past, present and future of geneties" held in Kuparovice, Czechoslovakia, August 26–28, 1982, pp. 229–235. Brno (1983).
- Zur Frage nach der systematischen Stellung der Limnanthaceae. Ein Vergleich mit den Boraginaceae s. str. (Boraginoideae sensu GÜRKE 1897), ausgehend von der Embryologie. Stapfia (Linz) 25: 1-59 (1991).

== Literature ==
- Johann Greilhuber: Nachruf für Rosalie Wunderlich. In: Stapfia (Linz) 25, S. I–III (1991) (zobodat.at [PDF; 682 kB])
