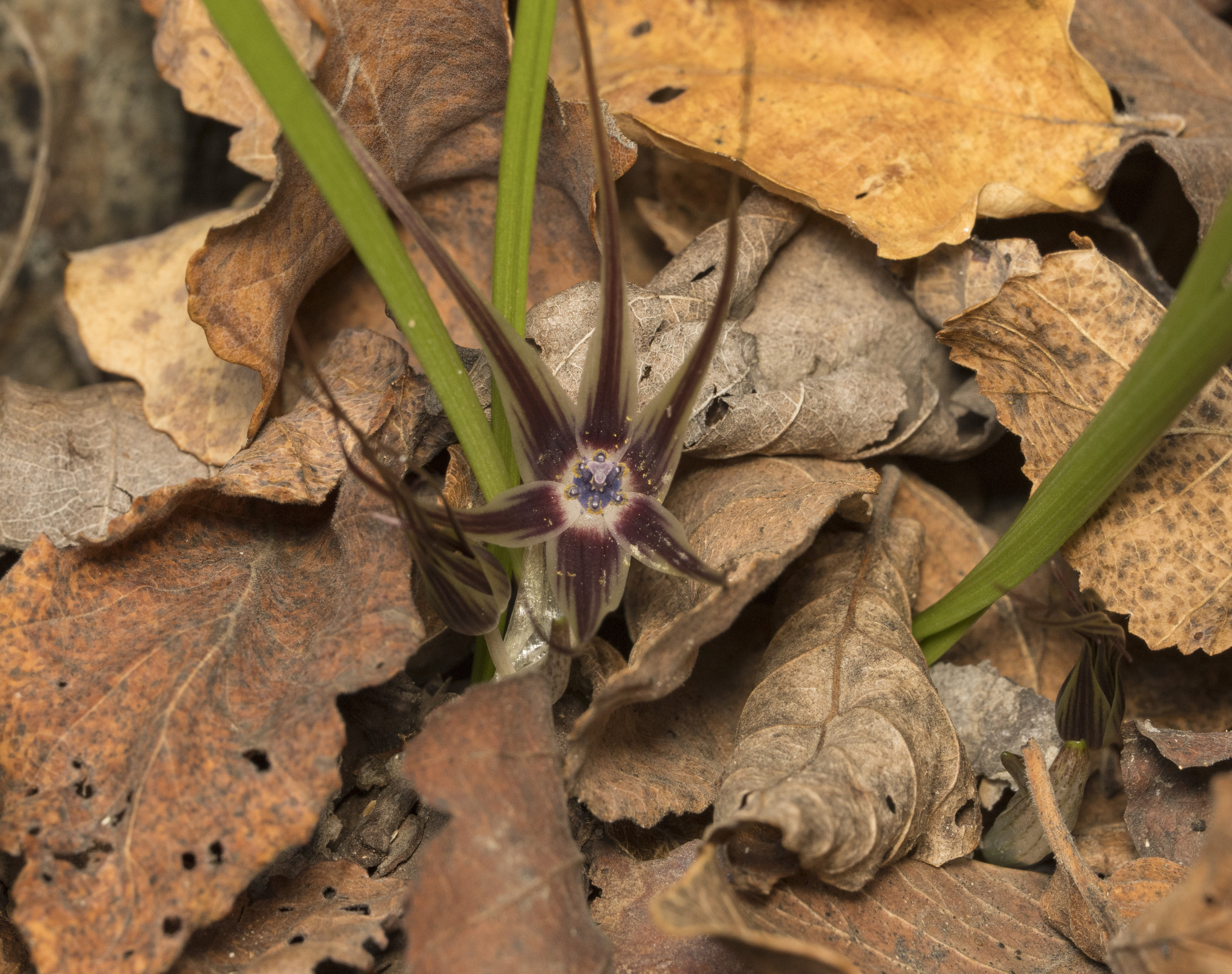

Scientific classification
- Kingdom: Plantae
- Clade: Tracheophytes
- Clade: Angiosperms
- Clade: Monocots
- Order: Asparagales
- Family: Amaryllidaceae
- Subfamily: Allioideae
- Genus: Miersia
- Species: M. humilis

Binomial name
- Miersia humilis (Phil.) M.F.Fay & Christenh.

= Miersia humilis =

Species of plant

Miersia humilis is a species of flowering plant in the family Amaryllidaceae. It is a bulbous geophyte endemic to Central Chile.
