= Florence Signaigo Wagner =

American botanist (1919–2019)

- Born: Florence Signaigo; February 18, 1919
- Died: October 21, 2019 (aged 100)
- Citizenship: United States of America
- Education: College of William & Mary; University of Michigan; University of California, Berkeley
- Known for: research into the evolution and classification of ferns
- Spouse: Warren Wagner, Jr. (1920–2000)
- Children: Margaret and Warren
- Scientific career
- Fields: botany
- Workplaces: University of Michigan

Florence Signaigo Wagner (February 18, 1919 – October 21, 2019) was an American botanist who served as president of the American Fern Society.

== Biography ==
Florence Signaigo was born in Birmingham, Michigan, on February 18, 1919 and grew up in Highland Park. Her first botanical interest focused on red algae.

She studied at the College of William & Mary (BA Philosophy), and the University of Michigan (MA Latin American studies), before receiving a PhD from the University of California, Berkeley. Her doctoral dissertation, under the phycologist George Frederik Papenfuss, was titled, Contributions to the Morphology of the Delesseriaceae. Florence Signaigo Wagner" (1954). She graduated in 1952, and published her thesis as a paper, in which she described the new genus Marionella, named for her landlady, the Berkeley embryologist and cytologist Marion Elizabeth Stilwell Cave (1904–1995).

After marrying a fellow graduate student, she moved with him to Michigan in 1951 and they both joined the University of Michigan.

She was employed as a botanist in Tunja, Colombia, and at the University of Michigan as a research scientist for more than five decades. Although known as a researcher, she also undertook field work collecting specimens. Her international identifier on the International Plant Names Index is 31701-1. As is usual in botany, she is listed as an abbreviation rather than using her full name when quoted or mentioned: F.S. Wagner.

=== Offices held ===
She held many offices in university, regional, and national societies including Chair of the Pteridological Section of the Botanical Society of America (1982-1984) and Vice-President (1984-1985) and then President (1986-1987) of the American Fern Society.

=== Personal life ===
She married the botanist Warren "Herb" Wagner, Jr. (1920–2000), who also became her work partner and co-author, and they had two children, Margaret and Warren. She died in Ann Arbor, Michigan, on October 21, 2019.

== Selected publications ==
Wagner published dozens of scientific papers.

- Wagner, F. S. (1954). Contributions to the morphology of the Delesseriaceae. Univ. Calif. Publs Bot., 27, 279-346.
- Wagner, F. S. (1955). CONTRIBUTIONS TO THE MORPHOLOGY. University of California Publications in Botany, 7, 279.
- Wagner, W. H., Wagner, F. S., Sutton, R. G., Rukavina, N. A., Towle, E. L., Tanghe, L. J., & Riggsby, E. D. (1965). Rochester area log ferns (Dryopteris celsa) and their hybrids. Rochester Academy of Science.
- Wagner, W. H., & Wagner, F. S. (1966). Pteridophytes of the Mountain Lake Area Giles Co., Virginia: Biosystematic Studies 1964-1965.
- Wagner, W. H., & Wagner, F. S. (1975). A hybrid polypody from the New World tropics.
