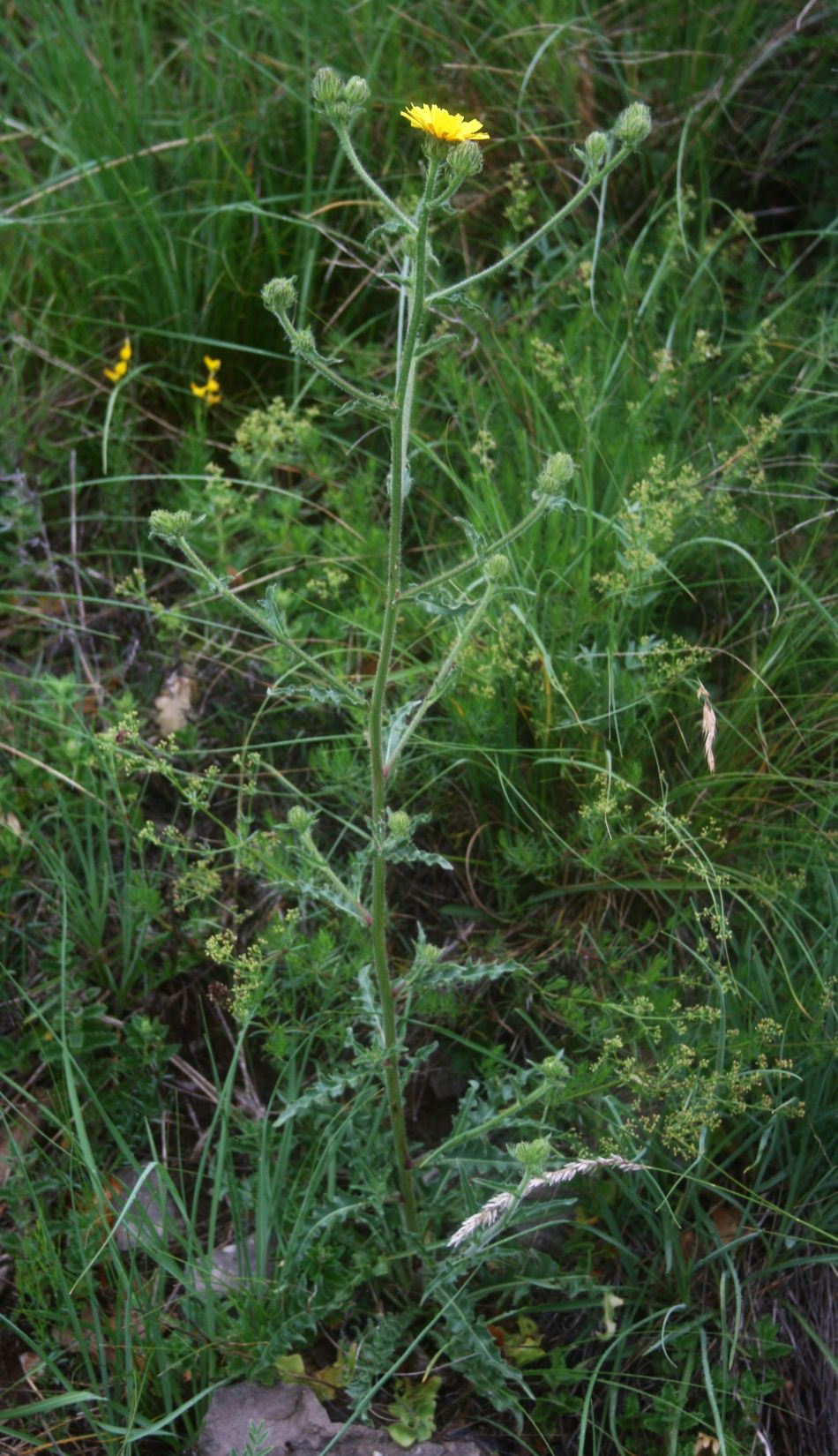

Scientific classification
- Kingdom: Plantae
- Clade: Tracheophytes
- Clade: Angiosperms
- Clade: Eudicots
- Clade: Asterids
- Order: Asterales
- Family: Asteraceae
- Genus: Crepis
- Species: C. setosa

Binomial name
- Crepis setosa Haller f.

Synonyms
- Synonymy: Aegoseris setosa (Haller f.) Fourr.; Apargia setosa Moench; Barkhausia hispida Link; Barkhausia nudiflora Viv. ex Coss.; Barkhausia setosa (Haller f.) DC.; Barkhausia setosa var. alpina Schur; Barkhausia setosa var. hispida (Waldst. & Kit.) Schur; Barkhausia setosa var. setosa; Crepidium asperum Tausch; Crepis agrestis M.Bieb.; Crepis aspera Suter; Crepis bannatica Willd.; Crepis hamata Vitman; Crepis hastata Kit.; Crepis hispida Waldst. & Kit.; Crepis muricata Vitman; Crepis nova Winterl; Crepis setosa subsp. setosa; Crepis setosa f. setosa; Crepis setosa subsp. typica Babc.; Hieracioides setosum (Haller f.) Kuntze; Nemauchenes aspera (L.) Endl.; Wibelia setosa (Haller f.) Röhl.

= Crepis setosa =

Species of flowering plant

Crepis setosa, the bristly hawksbeard, is a European species of flowering plant in the family Asteraceae. It has become naturalized in North America and occurs Washington, Oregon, California, Idaho, Montana, Texas, Arkansas, Missouri, Tennessee, Wisconsin, Ohio, Pennsylvania, New York, Connecticut and Vermont.

Crepis setosa grows in forest and areas with disturbance.
