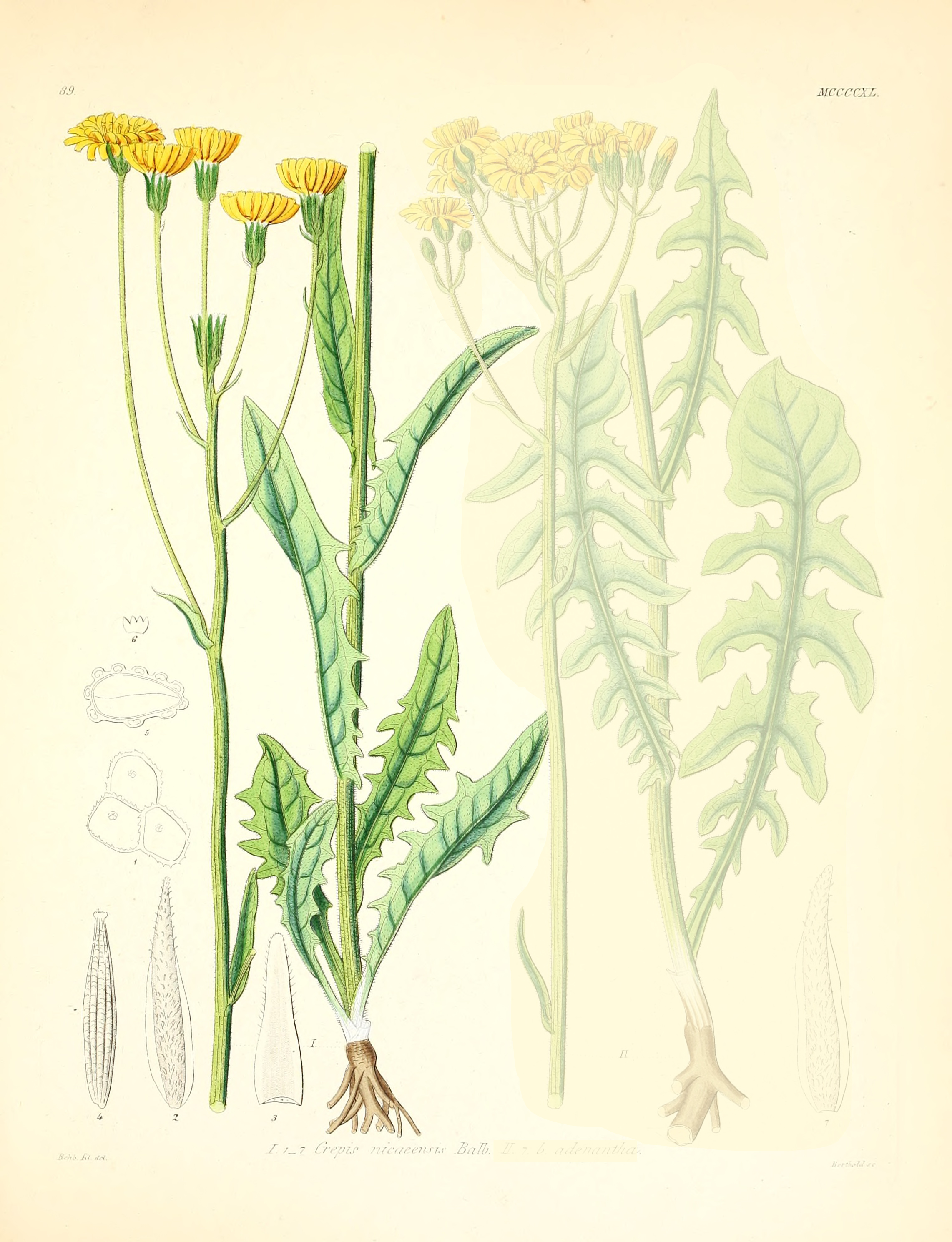

Scientific classification
- Kingdom: Plantae
- Clade: Tracheophytes
- Clade: Angiosperms
- Clade: Eudicots
- Clade: Asterids
- Order: Asterales
- Family: Asteraceae
- Genus: Crepis
- Species: C. nicaeensis

Binomial name
- Crepis nicaeensis Balb. ex Pers.

Synonyms
- Synonymy: Barkhausia nicaeensis (Pers.) Link ex Spreng.; Berinia nicaeensis (Pers.) Sch.Bip.; Brachyderea nicaeensis (Pers.) Sch.Bip.; Crepis adenantha Vis.; Crepis flexuosa Kit.

= Crepis nicaeensis =

Species of flowering plant

Crepis nicaeensis is a European species of flowering plant in the family Asteraceae with the common names French hawk's-beard and Turkish hawksbeard. It is widespread across much of Europe, as well as being sparingly naturalized in scattered locations in the United States and Canada.

Crepis nicaeensis is an annual or biennial herb up to 110 cm (44 inches) tall. One plant can produce as many as 15 flower heads, each with as many as 60 yellow ray florets but no disc florets.
