= Crepis czerepanovii =

Scientific classification
- Kingdom: Plantae
- Clade: Tracheophytes
- Clade: Angiosperms
- Clade: Eudicots
- Clade: Asterids
- Order: Asterales
- Family: Asteraceae
- Genus: Crepis
- Species: C. czerepanovii

Binomial name
- Crepis czerepanovii Tzvelev

Species of flowering plant

Crepis czerepanovii is a species of flowering plant belonging to the family Asteraceae.

Its native range is Finland and northwestern European Russia.
