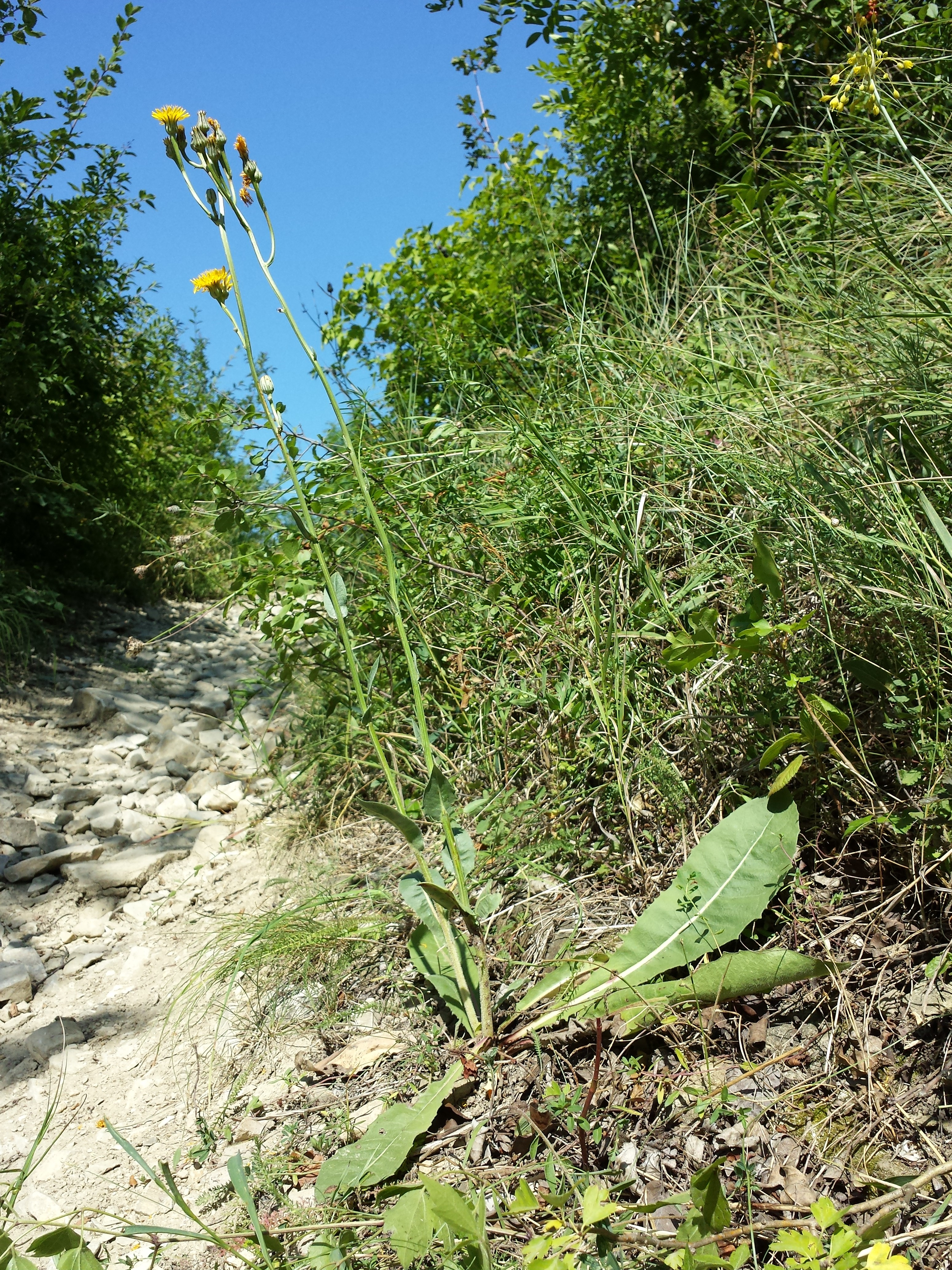

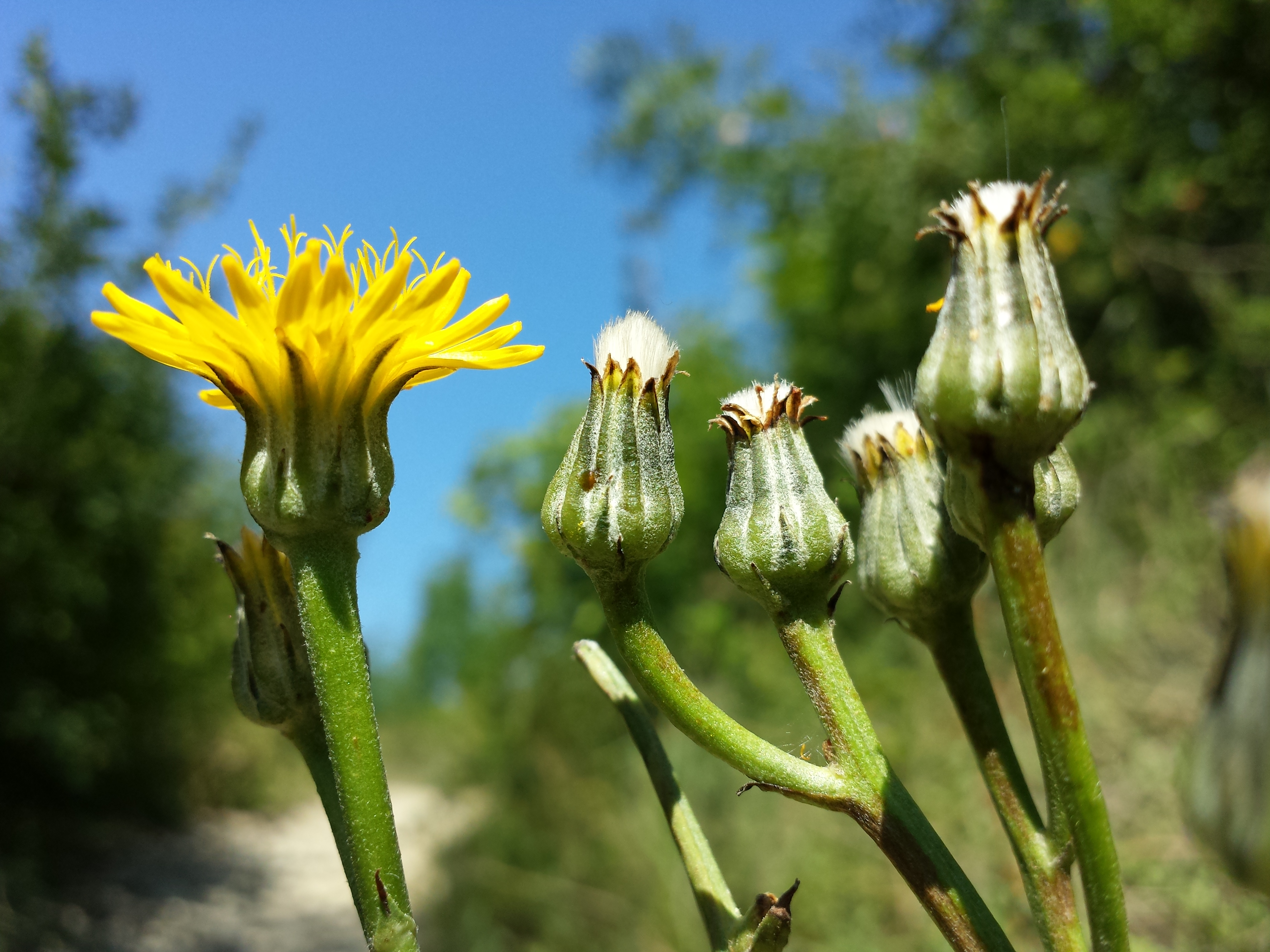

Scientific classification
- Kingdom: Plantae
- Clade: Tracheophytes
- Clade: Angiosperms
- Clade: Eudicots
- Clade: Asterids
- Order: Asterales
- Family: Asteraceae
- Genus: Crepis
- Species: C. pannonica

Binomial name
- Crepis pannonica (Jacq.) K. Koch

Synonyms
- Synonymy: Barkhausia rigida (Waldst. & Kit.) Sloboda; Berinia pannonica (Jacq.) Sch.Bip.; Brachyderea rigida (Waldst. & Kit.) Cass.; Crepis blavii (Asch.) Stadlm.; Crepis glochidiata (Prokh.) Prokh.; Crepis latifolia Balb. ex Pers.; Crepis rigida Waldst. & Kit.; Hieracioides pannonicum (Jacq.) Kuntze; Hieracium pannonicum Jacq.; Mulgedium blavii Asch.; Senecio glochidiatus Prokh.

= Crepis pannonica =

Species of flowering plant

Crepis pannonica, the pasture hawksbeard, is a European species of flowering plant in the family Asteraceae. It is native to eastern Europe (Austria, Czech Republic, Hungary, Romania, Ukraine, Russia, etc.) and the Caucasus, as well as being sparingly naturalized in the State of Connecticut in the northeastern United States.

Crepis pannonica is a perennial herb up to 130 cm (52 inches) tall. One plant can produce as many as 8 flower heads, each with as many as 90 yellow ray florets.
