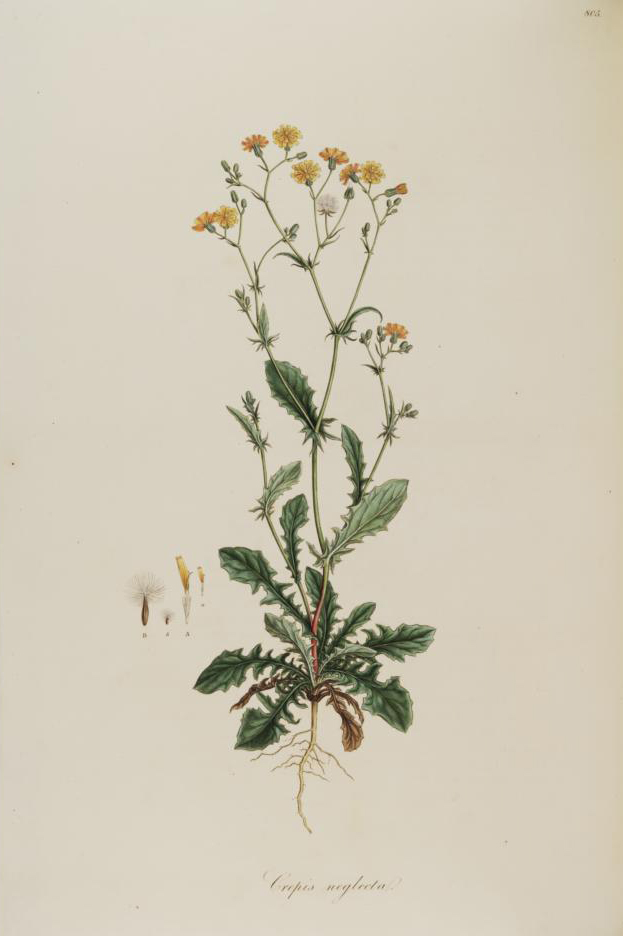
- botanical illustration of Crepis neglecta

Scientific classification
- Kingdom: Plantae
- Clade: Tracheophytes
- Clade: Angiosperms
- Clade: Eudicots
- Clade: Asterids
- Order: Asterales
- Family: Asteraceae
- Genus: Crepis
- Species: C. neglecta

Binomial name
- Crepis neglecta L. (1767)

Subspecies
- Crepis neglecta subsp. corymbosa (Ten.) Nyman; Crepis neglecta subsp. cretica (Boiss.) Vierh.; Crepis neglecta subsp. neglecta

= Crepis neglecta =

Species of flowering plant

Crepis neglecta is a species of flowering plant in the sunflower family, Asteraceae. It ranges from east-central to southeastern Europe and northwestern Turkey.

== Subspecies ==
Three subspecies are accepted.

- Crepis neglecta subsp. corymbosa (Ten.) Nyman – mainland Italy, Sicily, and mainland Greece
- Crepis neglecta subsp. cretica (Boiss.) Vierh. – eastern Crete and Karpathos
- Crepis neglecta subsp. neglecta – former Czechoslovakia, mainland Italy, former Yugoslavia, Albania, Bulgaria, mainland Greece, and northwestern Turkey.
