= Crepis auriculifolia =

Scientific classification
- Kingdom: Plantae
- Clade: Tracheophytes
- Clade: Angiosperms
- Clade: Eudicots
- Clade: Asterids
- Order: Asterales
- Family: Asteraceae
- Genus: Crepis
- Species: C. auriculifolia

Binomial name
- Crepis auriculifolia Sieber (1826)

Synonyms
- Berinia auriculifolia Sch.Bip. (1866); Crepis raulinii Boiss. (1849)

Species of flowering plant

Crepis auriculifolia is a species of flowering plant in the sunflower family, Asteraceae. It is endemic to Crete.
