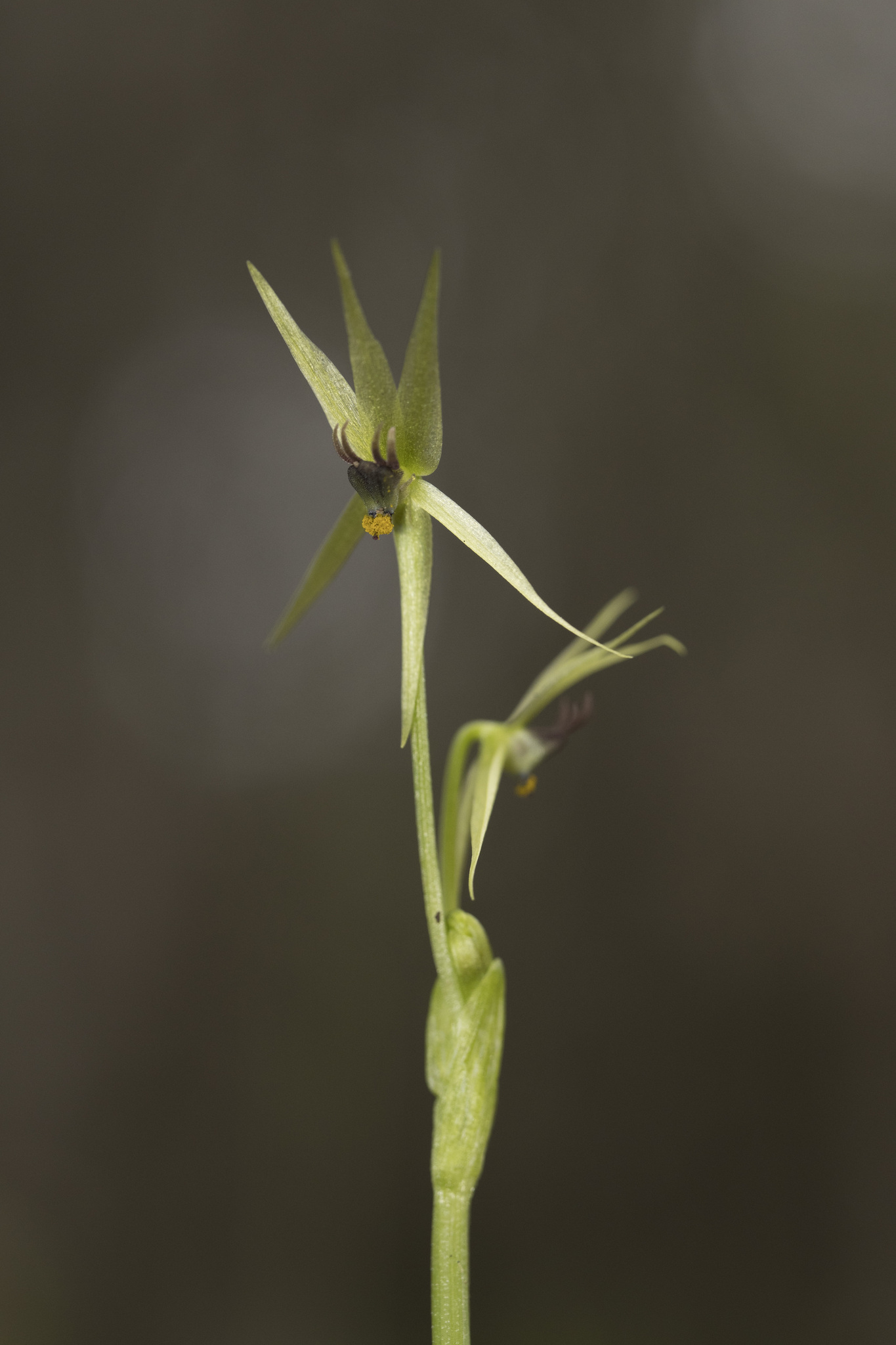
- Miersia chilensis

Scientific classification
- Kingdom: Plantae
- Clade: Tracheophytes
- Clade: Angiosperms
- Clade: Monocots
- Order: Asparagales
- Family: Amaryllidaceae
- Subfamily: Allioideae
- Tribe: Gilliesieae
- Genus: Miersia; Lindl.

Type species
- Miersia chilensis Lindl.

= Miersia =

Genus of flowering plants

Miersia is a plant genus in the Amaryllidaceae. The genus has 10 known species, 9 of which are endemic to Chile and one, M. rusbyi, endemic to Bolivia.

The genus name of Miersia is in honour of John Miers (1789–1879), a British botanist and engineer, best known for his work on the flora of Chile and Argentina.

== Species ==
The following species are listed in Plants of the World Online:

- Miersia chilensis Lindl.
- Miersia humilis (Phil.) M.F.Fay & Christenh.
- Miersia leporina Ravenna
- Miersia myodes Bertero
- Miersia putaendensis A.Cádiz-Véliz
- Miersia raucoana J.E.Sepúlveda & Nic.García
- Miersia rusbyi Britton
- Miersia stellata C.Cuevas & Nic.García
- Miersia tenuiseta Ravenna
- Miersia triloba (Ravenna) M.F.Fay & Christenh.
