= Crepis noronhaea =

Scientific classification
- Kingdom: Plantae
- Clade: Tracheophytes
- Clade: Angiosperms
- Clade: Eudicots
- Clade: Asterids
- Order: Asterales
- Family: Asteraceae
- Genus: Crepis
- Species: C. noronhaea

Binomial name
- Crepis noronhaea Babc. ex Jenkins

Species of flowering plant

Crepis noronhaea is a species of flowering plant in the family Asteraceae found only on Porto Santo island in the Madeira archipelago.
