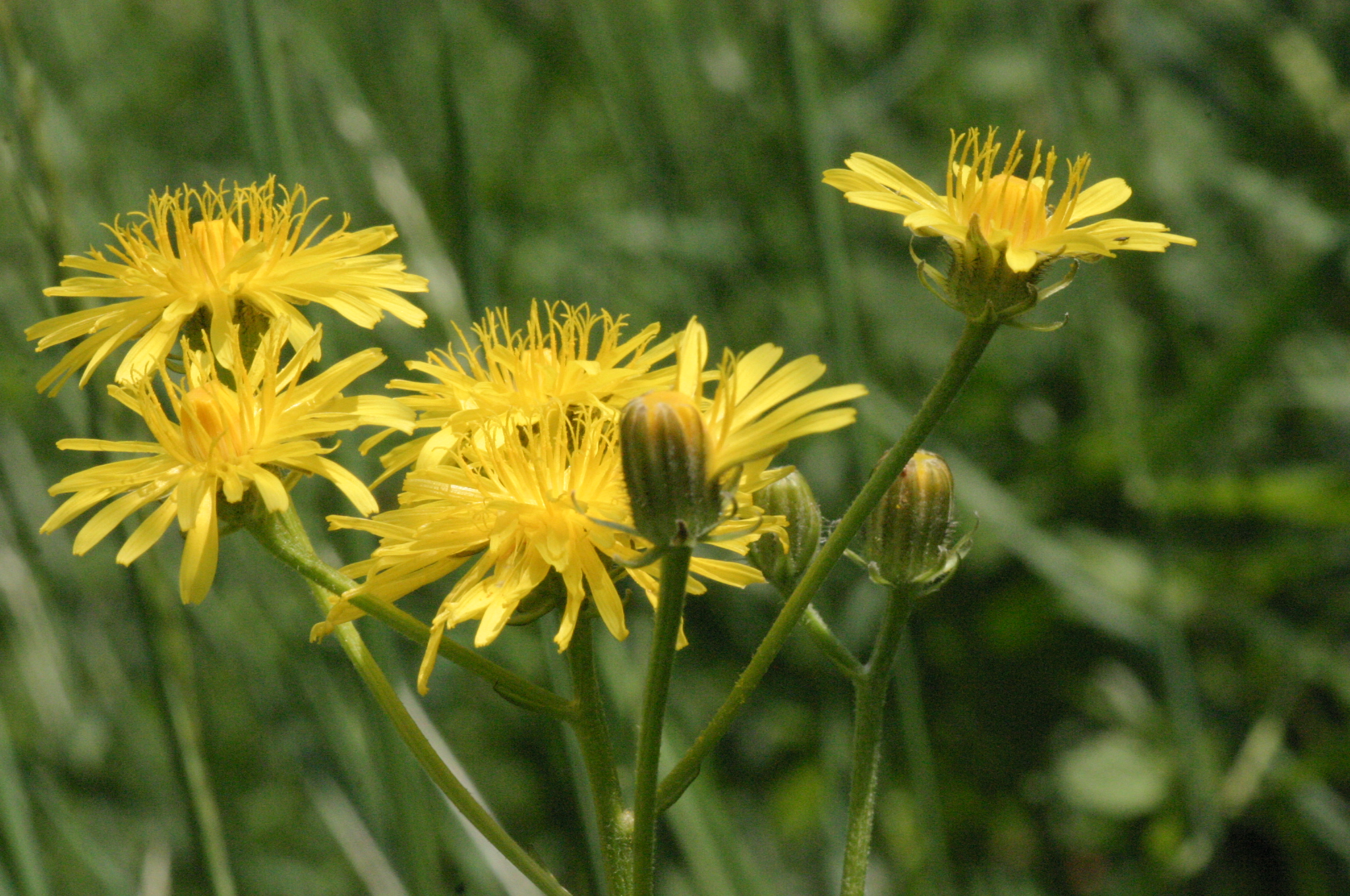

Scientific classification
- Kingdom: Plantae
- Clade: Tracheophytes
- Clade: Angiosperms
- Clade: Eudicots
- Clade: Asterids
- Order: Asterales
- Family: Asteraceae
- Genus: Crepis
- Species: C. biennis

Binomial name
- Crepis biennis L.

= Crepis biennis =

Species of flowering plant

Crepis biennis is a European species of flowering plant in the family Asteraceae with the common name rough hawksbeard. It is native to Europe and Asia Minor, as well as being sparingly naturalized in scattered locations in the northeastern United States and on the island of Newfoundland in eastern Canada.

== Description ==
Crepis biennis is a perennial herb up to 120 cm (48 inches) tall. One plant can produce as many as 14 small flower heads, each with up to 100 yellow ray florets but no disc florets.
