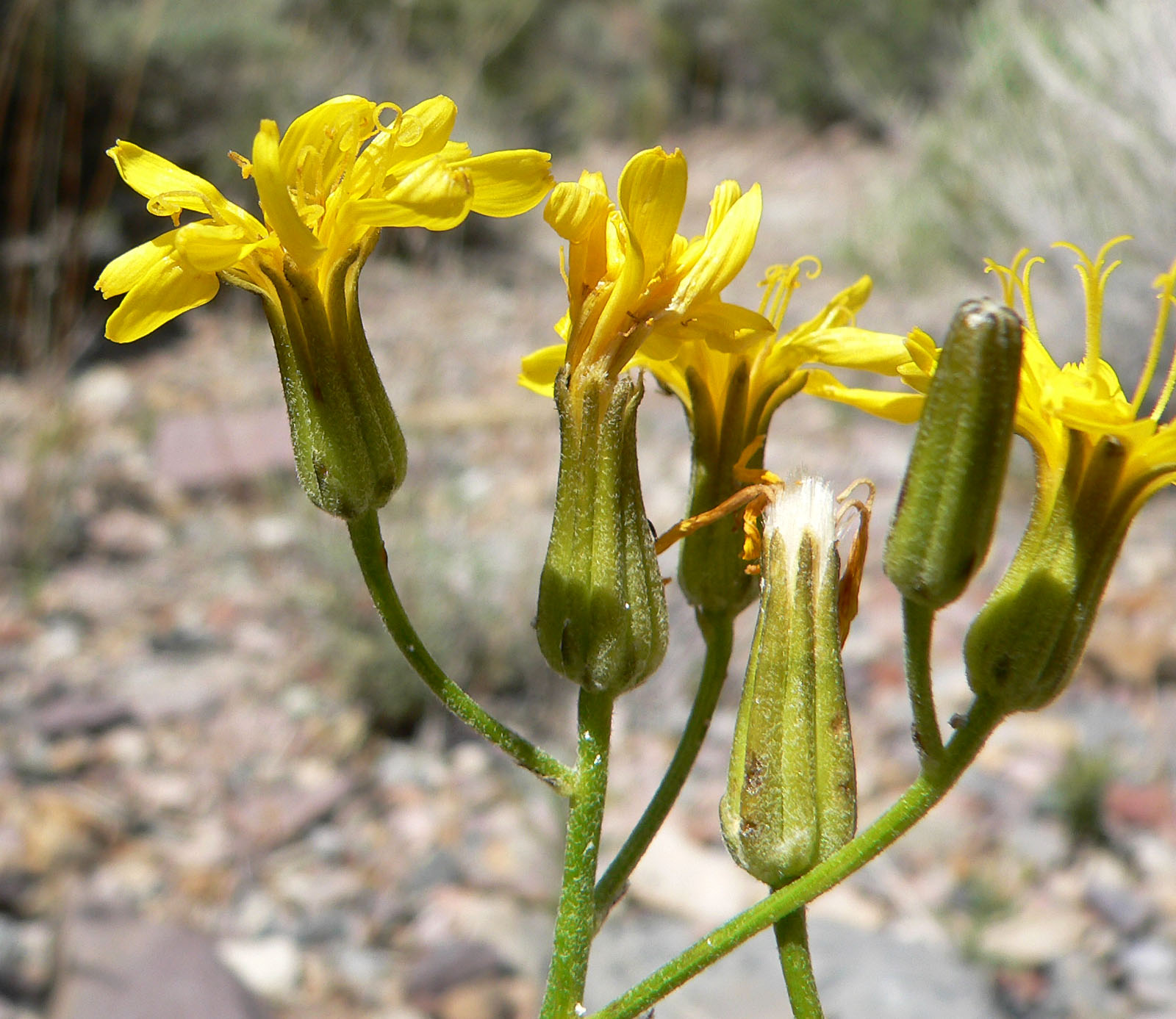

Conservation status
- Secure (NatureServe)

Scientific classification
- Kingdom: Plantae
- Clade: Tracheophytes
- Clade: Angiosperms
- Clade: Eudicots
- Clade: Asterids
- Order: Asterales
- Family: Asteraceae
- Genus: Crepis
- Species: C. intermedia

Binomial name
- Crepis intermedia A.Gray

Synonyms
- Hieracioides intermedium (A.Gray) Kuntze; Psilochenia intermedia (A.Gray) W.A.Weber

= Crepis intermedia =

Species of flowering plant

Crepis intermedia is a North American species of flowering plant in the family Asteraceae known by the common name limestone hawksbeard. It is native to the Pacific Northwest, Columbia Plateau, Great Plains and Southwestern regions of western North America.

Crepis intermedia grows in many types of open and forested habitat. It is a perennial herb growing an erect, multibranched stem from a thick taproot, reaching up to 70 centimeters (28 inches) in height. It has woolly green herbage. The leaves are lined with triangular lobes and the lowest leaves approach 40 centimeters (16 inches) long. The inflorescence is an open array of many ligulate flower heads, each with woolly phyllaries and several yellow ray florets but no disc florets. The fruit is a narrow, ribbed achene just under a centimeter long.
