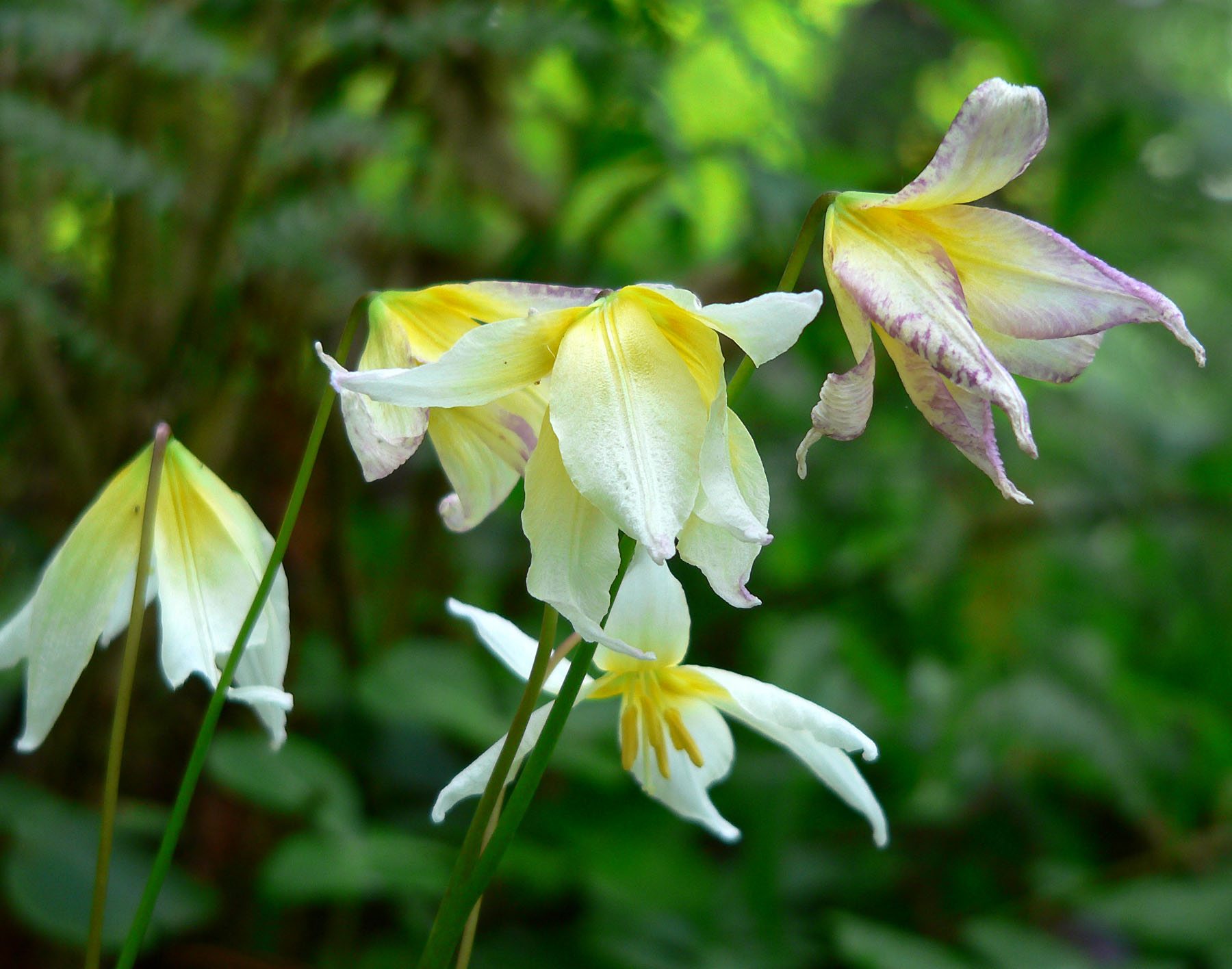

Scientific classification
- Kingdom: Plantae
- Clade: Tracheophytes
- Clade: Angiosperms
- Clade: Monocots
- Order: Liliales
- Family: Liliaceae
- Subfamily: Lilioideae
- Genus: Erythronium
- Species: E. helenae

Binomial name
- Erythronium helenae Applegate

= Erythronium helenae =

Species of flowering plant

Erythronium helenae is a species of flowering plant in the lily family which is known by the common names Pacific fawn lily and St. Helena fawn lily. It is endemic to the coastal mountains north of the San Francisco Bay Area in California. It is named for the local peak Mount Saint Helena, forming the point where Napa, Sonoma and Lake Counties meet. It grows on the slopes of the mountain at elevations of 500–1200 m, often on serpentine soils.

Erythronium helenae grows from a bulb 3 to 5 centimeters wide and produces two wide leaves up to 20 centimeters long which are green mottled with brown or white. It produces erect stalks up to 30 centimeters tall, each bearing one to three flowers. The flower has white tepals with yellowish bases 3 or 4 centimeters long. The tepals develop pink or purple streaks or mottling as they age. The flower has yellow stamens with large yellow anthers.
