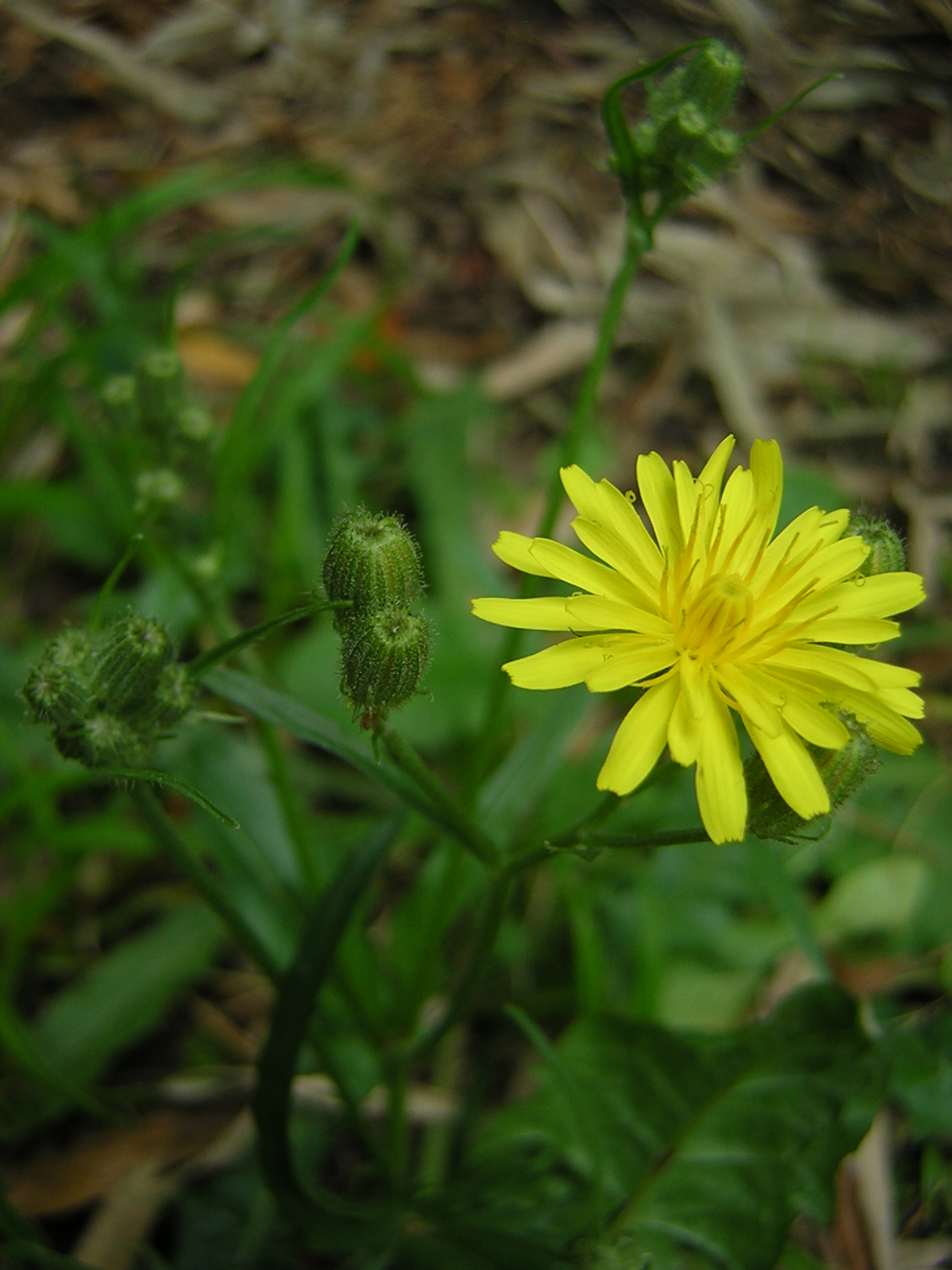

Scientific classification
- Kingdom: Plantae
- Clade: Tracheophytes
- Clade: Angiosperms
- Clade: Eudicots
- Clade: Asterids
- Order: Asterales
- Family: Asteraceae
- Genus: Crepis
- Species: C. foetida

Binomial name
- Crepis foetida L.

Synonyms
- Synonymy: Anisoderis foetida (L.) Fisch. & C.A.Mey.; Arnoseris foetida (L.) Dumort.; Barkhausia candollei Spreng.; Barkhausia divaricata Schur; Barkhausia echioides Schur; Barkhausia foetida (L.) F.W.Schmidt; Barkhausia gracilis (Lej.) Dumort.; Barkhausia graveolens (G.Gaertn. & al.) Link; Barkhausia interrupta (Sm.) Rchb.; Barkhausia prostrata Dumort.; Barkhausia radicata (Sm.) Godr.; Barkhausia rodigioides Sch.Bip. ex Tchich.; Barkhausia schimperi Sch.Bip. ex A.Rich.; Barkhausia triangularis K.Koch; Barkhausia zacinthia Margot & Reut. ex DC.; Berinia foetida (L.) Sch.Bip.; Chondrilla decandollei Steud.; Chondrilla decandollei Spreng. ex DC.; Crepis amygdalina Lag.; Crepis barbata Mill. 1768 not L. 1753; Crepis eritreensis Babc.; Crepis fallax Boiss.; Crepis foetens Link; Crepis gracilis] Lej.; Crepis graveolens (G.Gaertn. & al.) Schrad. ex Steud.; Crepis insularis Moris & De Not.; Crepis interrupta Sm.; Crepis kotschyana C.B.Clarke; Crepis prostrata (Dumort.) Michot; Crepis radiata Nyman; Crepis radicata Sm. 1813 not Forssk. 1775; Crepis rodigioides Sch.Bip.; Crepis schimperi (Sch.Bip. ex A.Rich.) Schweinf.; Crepis thomsonii Babc.; Crepis thracia Spreng.; Crepis zacinthia (Margot & Reut. ex DC.) Nyman; Hieracioides fallax (Boiss.) Kuntze; Hieracioides foetidum (L.) Kuntze; Hostia foetida (L.) Moench; Lapsana foetida (L.) Scop.; Lapsana leontodontoides Scop. ex DC.; Picris foetida (L.) Lam.; Rhynchopappus foetidus (L.) Dulac; Tolpis barbata (L.) Gaertn.; Wibelia foetida (L.) Sch.Bip.; Wibelia graveolens G.Gaertn., B.Mey. & Scherb.

= Crepis foetida =

Species of flowering plant

Crepis foetida is a European species of flowering plant in the family Asteraceae with the common name stinking hawksbeard. It is widespread across much of Europe and Siberia, as well as being sparingly naturalized in scattered locations in the United States and Australia.

Crepis foetida is an annual, biennial, or perennial herb up to 50 cm (20 inches) tall. One plant can produce as many as 10 flower heads, each with 100 or more yellow ray florets but no disc florets.

Subspecies

- Crepis foetida subsp. foetida
- Crepis foetida subsp. glandulosa (C.Presl) Arcang.
- Crepis foetida subsp. rhoeadifolia (M.Bieb.) Čelak.
