= Alpine plant =

Plants that grow at high elevation

An alpine plant is a plant that grows in an alpine climate, which occurs at high elevation and above the tree line. There are many different plant species and taxa that grow as a plant community in alpine tundra. These include perennial grasses, sedges, forbs, cushion plants, mosses, and lichens. Alpine plants are adapted to the harsh conditions of the alpine environment, which include low temperatures, dryness, ultraviolet radiation, wind, drought, poor nutritional soil, and a short growing season.

Some alpine plants serve as medicinal plants.

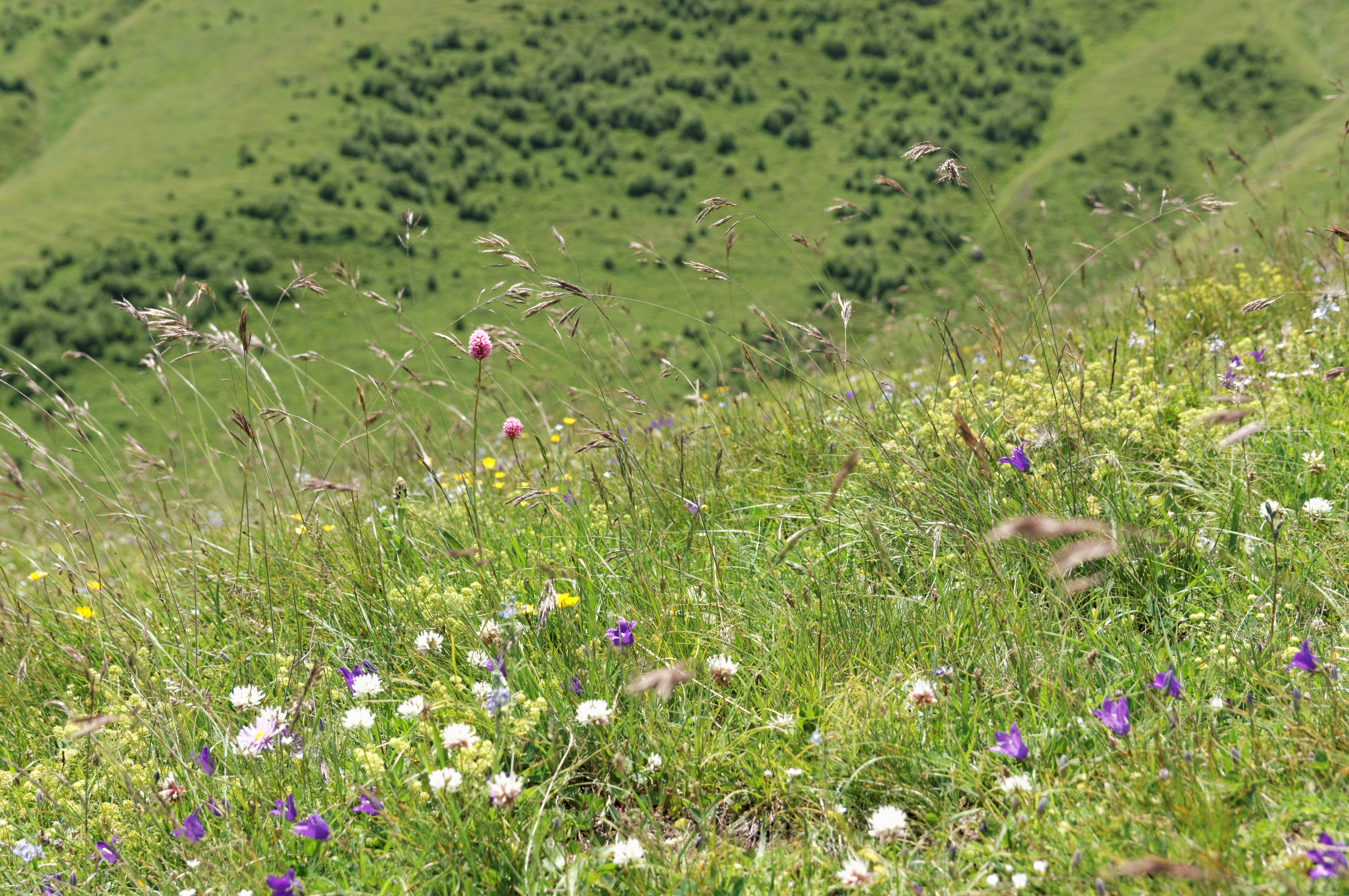
Alpine meadows in the Kazbegi National Park, Georgia

== Ecology ==
Alpine plants occur in a tundra: a type of natural region or biome that does not contain trees. Alpine tundra occurs in mountains worldwide. It transitions to subalpine forests below the tree line; stunted forests occurring at the forest-tundra ecotone are known as Krummholz. With increasing elevation, it ends at the snow line where snow and ice persist through summer, also known as the Nival Zone.

Alpine plants are not limited to higher elevations. However, high-elevation areas have different ecology than those growing at higher latitudes. One of the biggest distinctions is that the lower bound of a tropical alpine area is difficult to define due to a mixture of human disturbances, dry climates, and a naturally lacking tree line. The other major difference between tropical and arctic-alpine ecology is the temperature differences. The tropics have a summer/winter cycle every day, whereas the higher latitudes stay cold both day and night. In the northern latitudes, the main factor to overcome is the cold. Frost action processes have a strong effect on the soil and vegetation of arctic-alpine regions. Tropical alpine regions are subject to these conditions as well, but they seldom happen. Because northern alpine areas cover a massive area it can be difficult to generalize the characteristics that define the ecology. One factor in alpine ecology is wind in an area. Wind pruning is a common sight within northern alpine regions. Along with wind pruning, wind erosion of vegetation mats is a common sight throughout Alaska.

== Growth ==
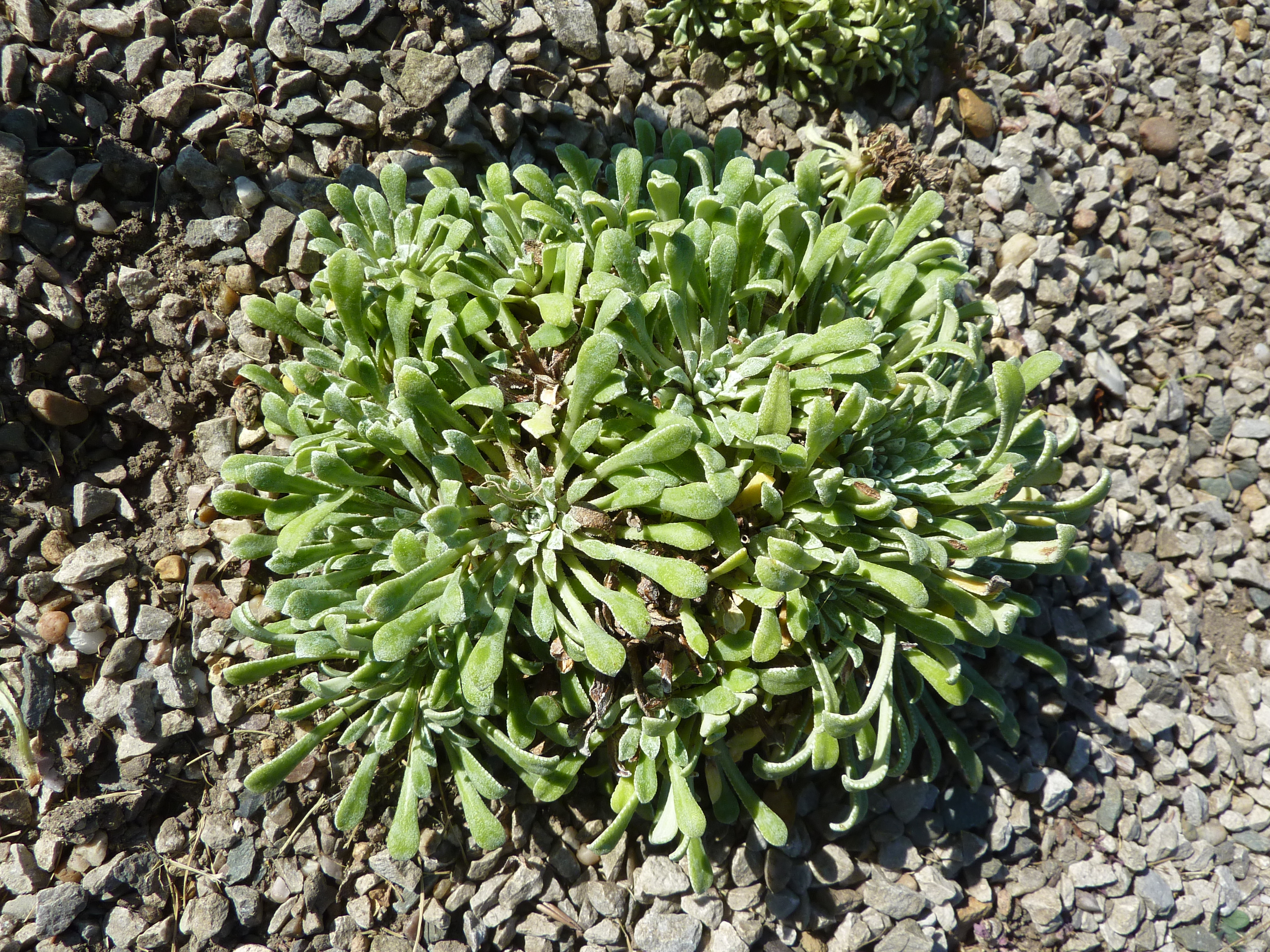
Saxifraga

Long-lived perennial herbs are the most common type of plant in alpine environments, with most having a large, well-developed root and/or rhizome system. These underground systems store carbohydrates through the winter which are then used in the spring for new shoot development. Some species of saxifrages have small root systems, but are evergreen. The leaves of these plants store energy in the form of carbohydrates and lipids. Alpine plants go into vegetative dormancy at the end of the growing period, forming perennating buds with the shortening photoperiod.

Seedling establishment is very slow and occurs less often than vegetative reproduction. In the first year of growth of perennial alpine plants, most of the photosynthate is used in establishing a stable root system which is used to help prevent desiccation and for carbohydrate storage over winter. In this year, the plant may produce a few true leaves, but usually, only the cotyledons are produced. It usually takes a few years for plants to become well established.

== Adaptations ==
Alpine plants can exist at very high elevations, from 300 to 6,000 metres (1,000 to 20,000 ft), depending on location. For example, there is a moss that grows at 6,480 m (21,260 ft) on Mount Everest. Arenaria bryophylla is the highest flowering plant in the world, occurring as high as 6,180 m (20,280 ft).

To survive, alpine plants are adapted to the conditions at high elevations, including cold, dryness, high levels of ultraviolet radiation, and difficulty of reproduction. These conditions are linked to topographical slope, ultimately affecting plant diversity and distribution. This is due to steeper slopes causing faster soil erosion which in turn impedes plant growth, seed distribution, and seed settlement. Furthermore, the slope of the topography directly affects many other abiotic factors including temperature, solar radiation, moisture content, and nutritional content in the soil.

=== Surviving low temperature extremes ===
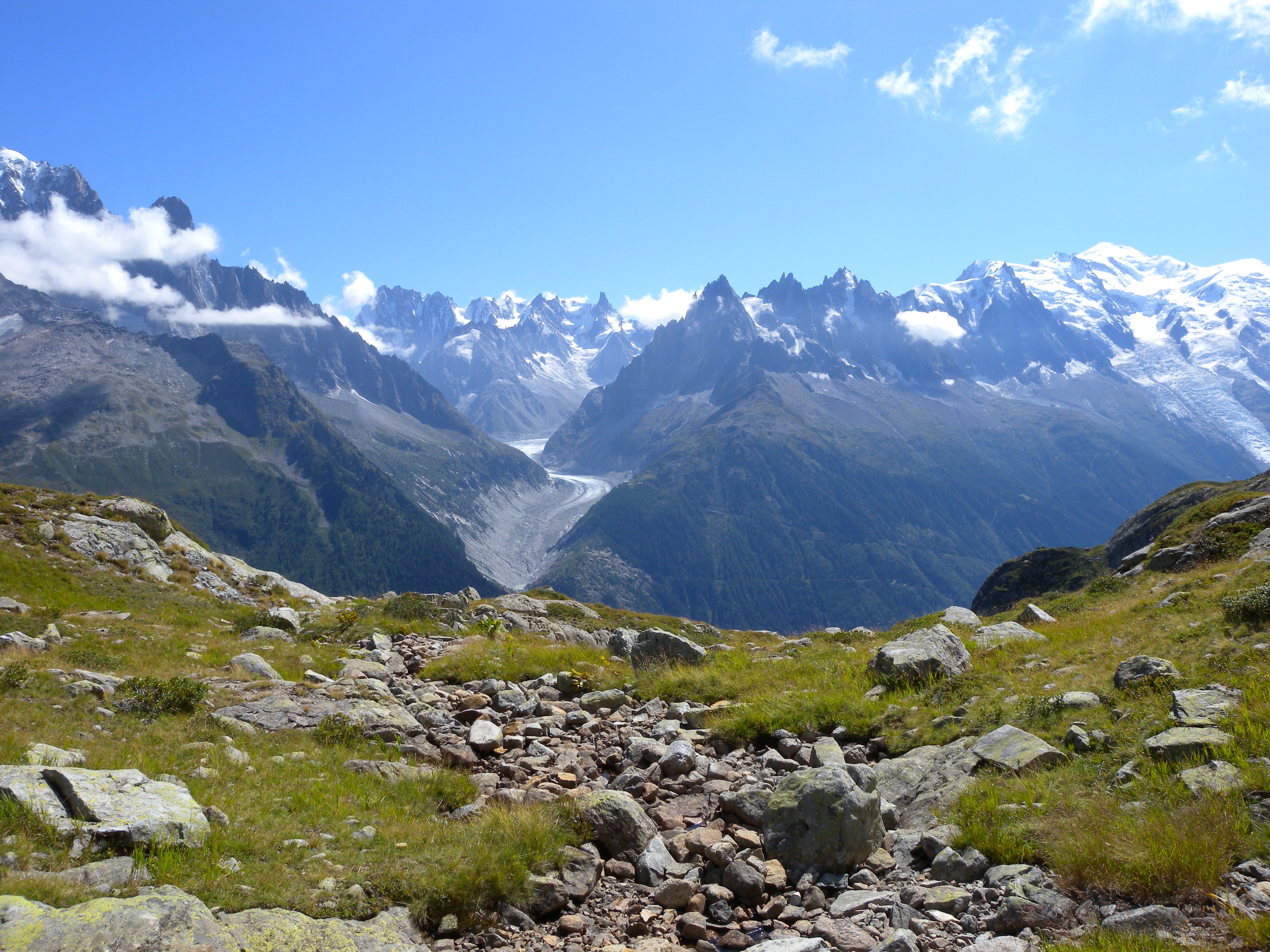
Alpine habitat on Mont Blanc Massif

Most alpine plants are faced with low-temperature extremes at some point in their lives. There are several ways that a plant can survive these extremes. Plants can avoid exposure to low temperature by using different forms of seasonal phenology, morphology, or by variable growth form preference. One way is to hide most of the plant in the soil and only letting the flowers and leaves be exposed to air. They can also avoid the freezing of their exposed tissues by increasing the number of solutes in their tissues, known as freezing-point depression. Another, somewhat similar, method plants may use to avoid freezing is supercooling, which prevents ice crystallization within plant tissues. These methods are only sufficient when the temperature is only moderately cold. In the alpine zone, temperatures are often low enough that these methods are not sufficient. When plants need a more permanent solution, they can develop freeze tolerance. Plants can also dehydrate their cells by moving water into intercellular spaces. This causes ice formation outside of the cell where ice crystals will not cause damage. When all of these strategies fail to prevent frost damage, alpine plants often have the capacity to repair or replace the organs damaged. As it is often difficult to prevent damage, many alpine plants depend on the replacement of their organs. They help make this possible by placing their meristems below ground, where temperatures are generally warmer.

=== Photosynthesis and respiration rates ===
Photosynthesis and respiration rates are not uniform throughout the growing season. At the start of the growing season, new shoots have low net photosynthesis rates and high respiration rates due to rapid growth of new shoots. As the temperature rises in a plants microclimate, the net photosynthesis rates will increase as long as ample water is available and will peak during flowering. Alpine plants are able to start photosynthesizing and reach maximum photosynthesis rates at lower temperatures compared to plants adapted to lower elevations and warmer climates. This is due to the combined effects of genotype and environmental factors.

=== Avoidance of desiccation ===
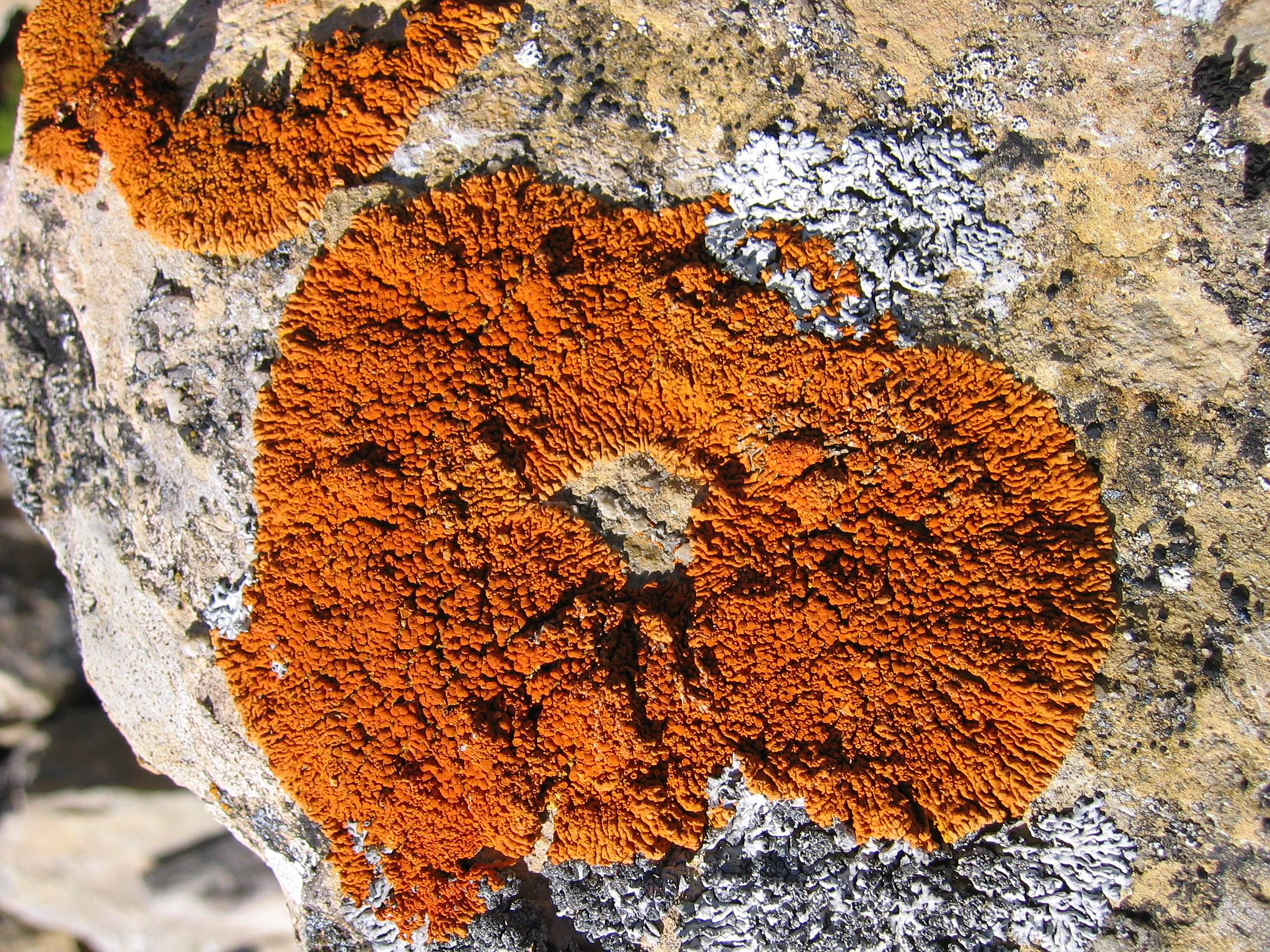
A common alpine lichen, Xanthoria elegans

In alpine areas, water availability is often variable. Bryophytes and lichens exhibit high desiccation tolerance, which contributes to their abundance throughout all alpine areas habitats. Among higher plants, tissue desiccation is rare at high elevation. If it does occur, it normally happens to plants growing on exposed sites, where wind stress is increased. Alpine plants avoid water loss by deep rooting and increased stomatal control. Plants at low elevation normally reach a maximum stomatal opening in the morning while alpine plants reach maximum opening mid-day when the temperature is greatest. Alpine succulent plants often utilize CAM photosynthesis to avoid water loss.

=== Avoidance of ultraviolet radiation ===
Because ultraviolet radiation tends to increase with elevation, it is often assumed to be a stress factor among alpine plants. In the past, there have been many attempts to research how ultraviolet radiation may influence alpine plant forms. However, it is uncertain if the growth and development of plants are affected by ultraviolet radiation. It is also not clear if the radiation is responsible for promoting genetic differentiation, leading to stunted growth forms.

=== Reproduction ===
Alpine plants use both sexual reproduction and asexual reproduction. Sexual reproduction has limits in high alpine areas, especially in areas with a short growing season in alpine zones at high latitudes. In tropical alpine zones with a year-round growing season, such as the northern Andes, plants can flower year-round. Regardless of when alpine plants flower, pollinators are often scarce. The activity of pollinators decreases with increasing elevation. The most common pollinators in the alpine zone are bumblebees and flies. Plants utilize different strategies to deal with these limits, including alternate flowering time and clonal propagation.

==== Early flowering plants ====
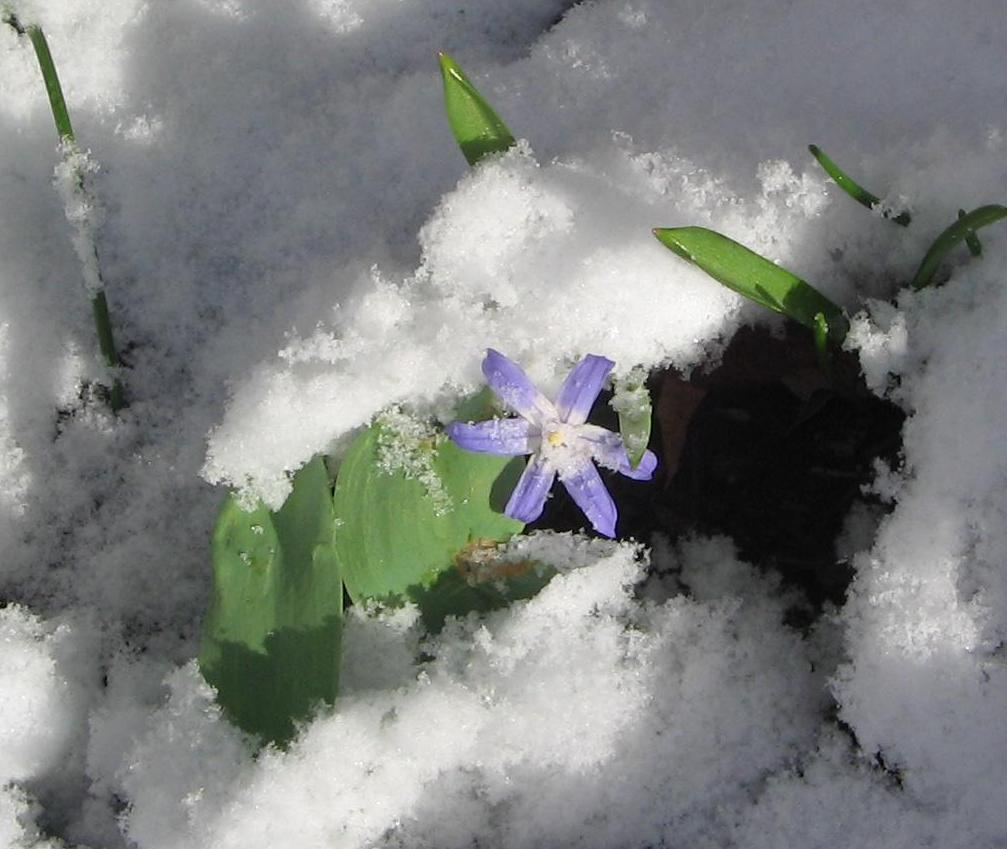
Glory-of-the-Snow is an alpine plant that preforms its flowers in the previous season so that it can flower as soon as the snow starts to melt in spring

Some plants flower immediately after snow melting or soil thawing. These early flowering plants always form their flowers in the previous season, called preformation. This flower primordium is produced one to three years before flowering which ensures that flowering is not delayed after snowmelt and that with the right environmental conditions, there will be enough time for seed set. Consequently, they risk frost damage to the preformed inflorescence. In order to minimize frost damage, preformed flowers are often surrounded by tightly packed bracts that are densely covered in trichomes. This helps to keep the interior of a flower bud warm. Because of early-season pollinator limitation, plants that bloom early generally have a low rate of reproductive success. One advantage of flowering early is that seeds that are produced have a greater chance of developing to maturity before the next freeze. They also have a high outcrossing rate, which helps to increase genetic diversity. Speed and time of flowering is dependent on the time of snowmelt, temperature, and photoperiod, but usually occurs 10 to 20 days after snowmelt. The alpine snowbell is a plant with a high enough metabolism that the heat is able to melt the surrounding snow.

==== Mid-season flowering ====
Approximately half of all alpine species flower in mid-season. Flowering at the seasonal peak combines some of the advantages and risks of early flowering and late flowering plants. Some mid-season plants pre-form their inflorescences, but not all do.

==== Late flowering ====
Late flowering occurs after the main growing season ends. They have a high seed output but their seeds have a reduced rate of maturing because of time constraints. These plants tend towards self pollination, apomixis, and vivipary.

==== Clonal propagation ====
Because investment in flowers and seed production can be costly for alpine plants, they often use clonal propagation. This strategy becomes increasingly more frequent as elevation increases, and is most common among cryptogams and grasses. Some alpine plants use it as their predominant method of reproduction. In these plants, sexual reproduction is rare and does not contribute significantly to reproductive output. An example of such a plant is Carex curvula, which is estimated to have a clonal age of approximately 2000 years.

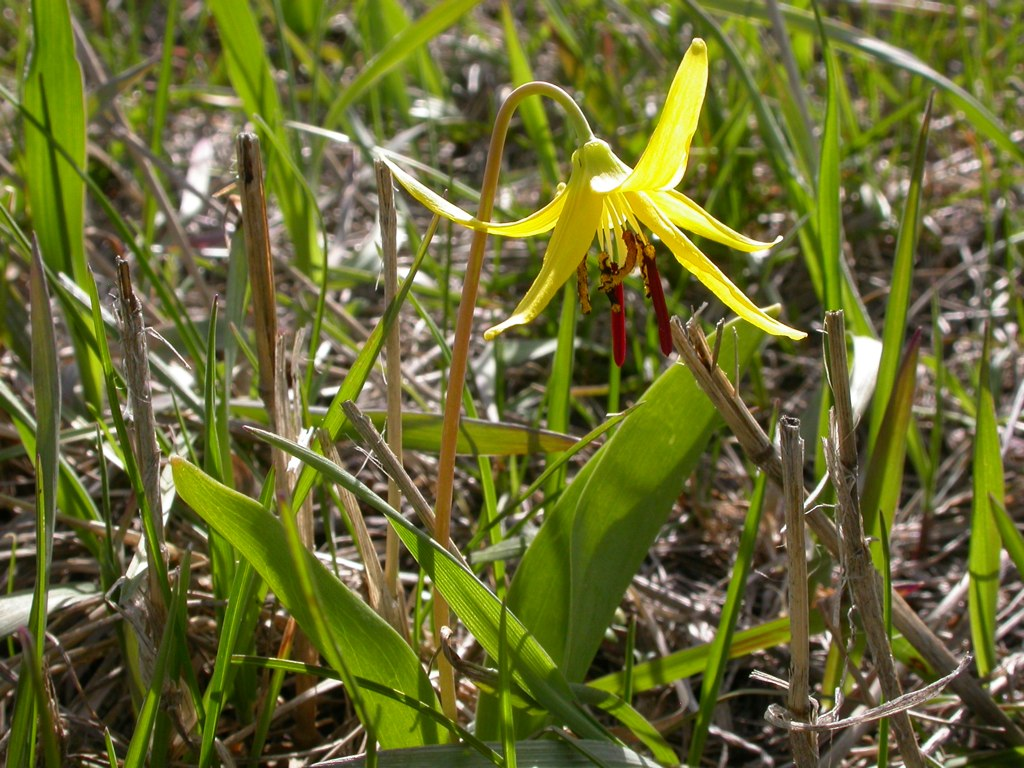
Erythronium grandiflorum

After establishment, each year new shoot growth occurs rapidly from the perennating bud which is usually located close to the soil surface. This growth occurs after snowmelt when the soil temperature is above 0 °C. Some species, like Erythronium grandiflorum, can begin new shoot growth before snowmelt as they have their perennating buds located in bulbs buried deep in the soil. As new leaves protrude from the snow, the new shoots give off heat from thermal reradiation and/or respiratory heat which melts the surrounding snow. This exposes more soil to solar radiation, heating it up and allowing new growth to accelerate.

== Medicinal alpine plants ==
There are a number of alpine plants that are used economically. In the Himalayas, hundreds of species are traded for medicinal and aromatic uses. It is estimated that the annual trade of these plants amounts to millions of US dollars. Many households in rural Nepal and India rely on medicinal alpine plant trade as a source of income. This creates an increased need to focus on plant conservation in these areas, ensuring sustainable harvest as well as ecosystem sustainability. Some of the species harvested in Nepal include Neopicrorhiza scrophulariiflora, Nardostachys grandiflora, Aconitum spicatum, Dioscorea deltoidea, Aconitum heterophyllum, Rheum australe, and Bergenia. In the Indian Himalayas, the alpine medicinal plants such as Dactylorhiza hatagirea, Picrorhiza kurrooa, Aconitum heterophyllum, Fritillaria roylei, Podophyllum hexandrum are under severe pressure due to over-exploitation for commercial purposes.

== See also ==
- Alpinum (garden)
- Alpine Garden Society
- Flora of the Alps
