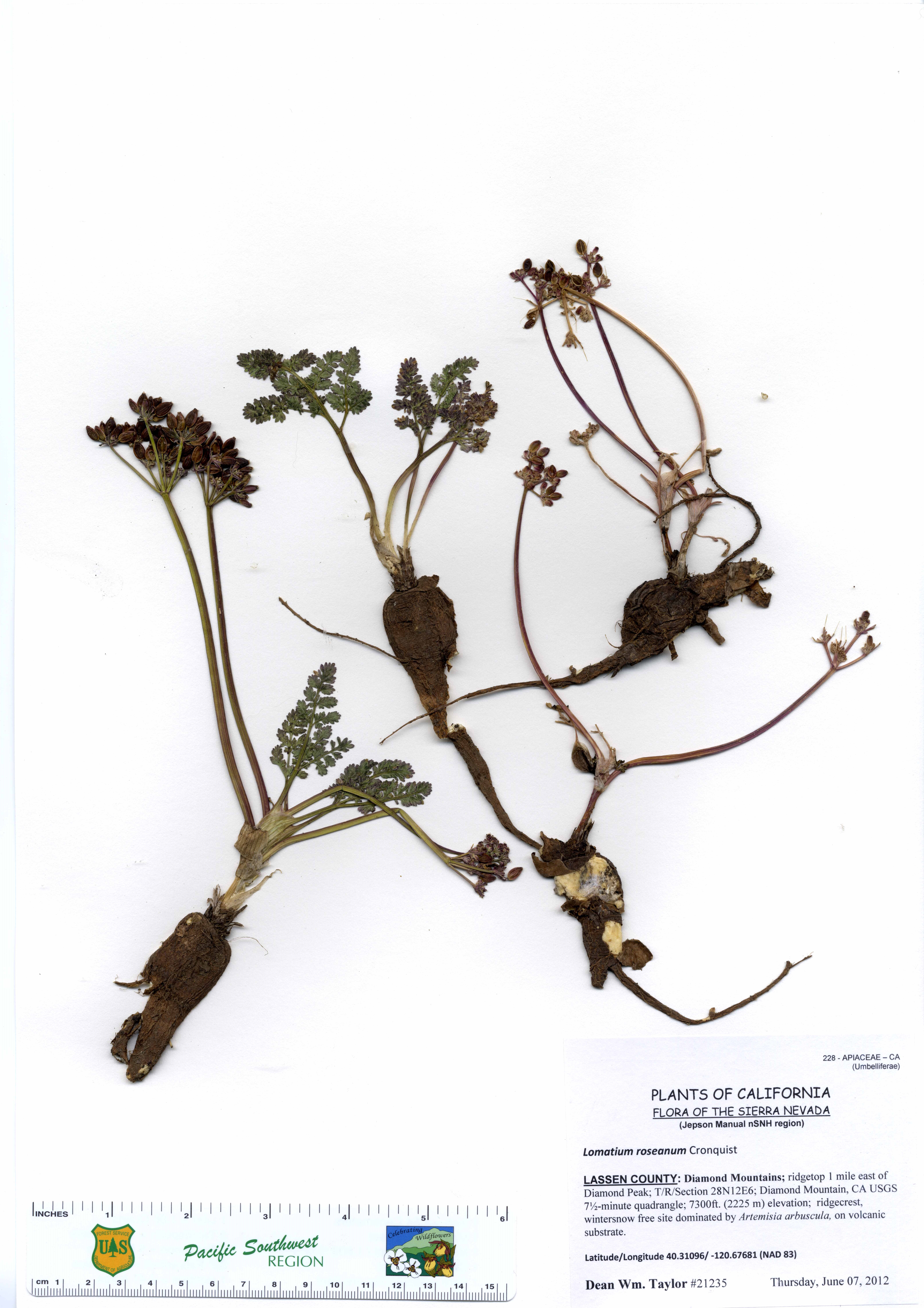

Conservation status
- Imperiled (NatureServe)

Scientific classification
- Kingdom: Plantae
- Clade: Tracheophytes
- Clade: Angiosperms
- Clade: Eudicots
- Clade: Asterids
- Order: Apiales
- Family: Apiaceae
- Genus: Lomatium
- Species: L. roseanum

Binomial name
- Lomatium roseanum Cronquist

Synonyms
- Leptotaenia leibergii J.M.Coult. & Rose 1900, not Lomatium leibergii J.M. Coult. & Rose 1900

= Lomatium roseanum =

Species of flowering plant

Lomatium roseanum, adobe parsley, also known as adobe lomatium and rose-flowered desert-parsley, is a very rare plant of the Western U.S., known only from northwestern Nevada and southeastern Oregon, and which may also occur in northeastern California. The largest populations occur on the Sheldon National Wildlife Refuge. It is a member of the celery family, the Umbelliferae, and has yellow flowers.

== Technical description ==
- Plant perennial, long-lived, usually over 10 cm tall, glabrous, somewhat caulescent at the base.
- Root tuberous, thick.
- Leaves green, shiny, ternate, with ternate-pinnately dissected leaflets, the ultimate segments numerous and small (<1 cm); petiole dilated (flared out) and sheathing at the base.
- Scapes (peduncles) ascending, arcuate (curved), 15–20 cm long.
- Involucels with slender bractlets.
- Flowers yellow, aging to whitish.
- Fruit only very narrowly laterally winged; dorsal ribs wingless.

== Distribution, habitat, and ecology ==
The range of adobe parsley is extremely limited: it is known only from Washoe County in Nevada and nearby places in southeastern Oregon, where it has possibly already been extirpated. It is also suspected to exist in Humboldt County, Nevada. Fewer than 20 known populations exist, though these can be large.

Adobe parsley lives in loose, rocky habitat. Specifically, it prefers dry basalt talus scree overlying clay soils. It associates with the low sagebrush community, and specific associates include Artemisia arbuscula, Poa secunda, Elymus elymoides, Arenaria aculeata, Phlox spp., Erigeron linearis, etc.

The fire ecology is unknown for members of this genus. The low sagebrush community type within which adobe parsley lives generally lacks enough fuels to carry a fire. When it does burn, these non-fire adapted shrubs are usually killed and replaced by medusahead and cheatgrass, and re-establish low sagebrush vegetation through time (2 to 5 years) via seeds.

== Conservation status and threats ==
- U.S. Forest Service: Pacific Southwest Region Sensitive Species
- California Native Plant Society: Not Listed (not known from California)
- Nevada Natural Heritage Program: Sensitive Plant
- NatureServe Nevada State Rank: S2S3; Global Rank: G2

== Field identification ==
Adobe parsley occurs between 5,750 feet (1,750 m) and 6,175 feet (1,882 m) above sea level. It flowers and may be most easily recognized in early spring, i.e., between April and June. It stands out because of its tuberous root, yellow flowers, and green shiny leaves. It resembles L. hendersonii, which is found farther north, but is more robust (larger) and somewhat caulescent.
