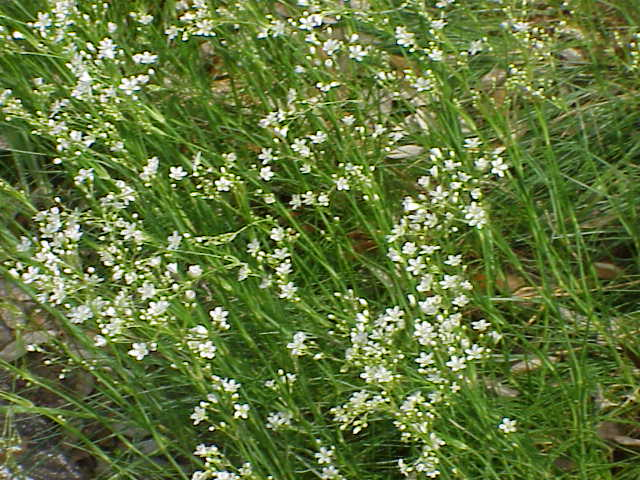

Scientific classification
- Kingdom: Plantae
- Clade: Tracheophytes
- Clade: Angiosperms
- Clade: Eudicots
- Order: Caryophyllales
- Family: Caryophyllaceae
- Genus: Eremogone
- Species: E. saxatilis

Binomial name
- Eremogone saxatilis (L.) Ikonn.

= Eremogone saxatilis =

Species of flowering plant

Eremogone saxatilis is a species of flowering plant belonging to the family Caryophyllaceae.

Its native range is Eastern Europe to Siberia and Central Asia.

Synonym:

- Arenaria saxatilis L.
