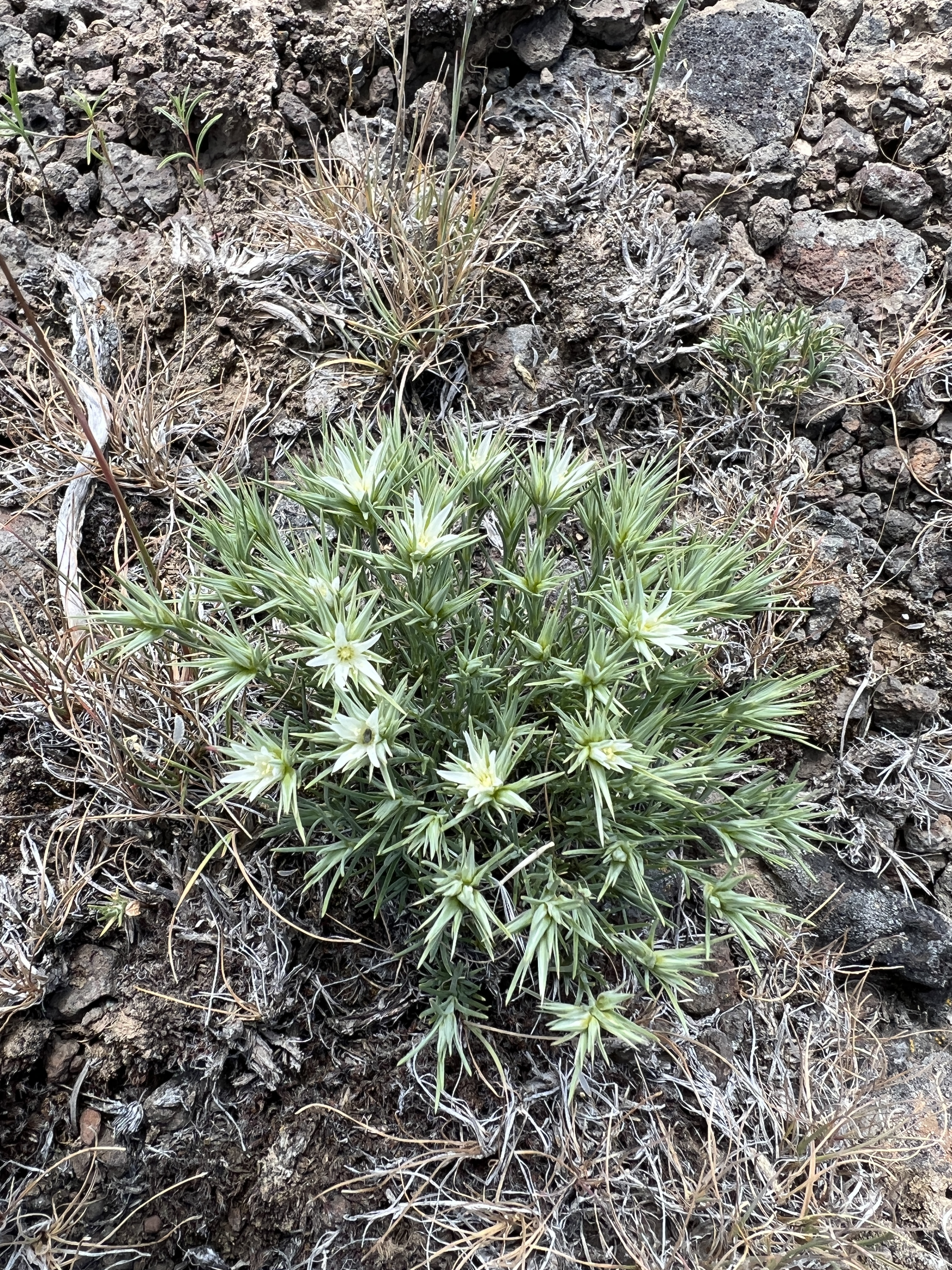

Scientific classification
- Kingdom: Plantae
- Clade: Tracheophytes
- Clade: Angiosperms
- Clade: Eudicots
- Order: Caryophyllales
- Family: Caryophyllaceae
- Genus: Eremogone
- Species: E. franklinii

Binomial name
- Eremogone franklinii Douglas ex Hook.

= Eremogone franklinii =

Species of plant

Eremogone franklinii is a species of perennial herb in the Caryophyllaceae family with the common name Franklin's sandwort. It is native to eastern Washington and Oregon to southern Idaho and northern Nevada.

== Description ==
Eremogone franklinii is a tufted glabrous perennial with a branched base and numerous prostrate or spreading stems that grows up to 10 cm (rarely 15 cm) tall. Each stem is covered with overlapping narrowly triangular leaves with a needle-like tip. Each leaf is 1 to 2 cm long and medium green, often grading to paler green with whitish longitudinal markings near the upper end of each stem. The white flowers form singly or in dense clusters at the tip of each leafy stem. Each flower is about 2 cm across and has 5 pointed green sepals and 5 spreading oblanceolate white petals.

== Range and habitat ==
Eremogone franklinii grows in open seasonally dry sandy or rocky soils, often associated with scrubby sagebrushes. It is native to eastern Washington and Oregon to southern Idaho and northern Nevada.

== Gallery ==
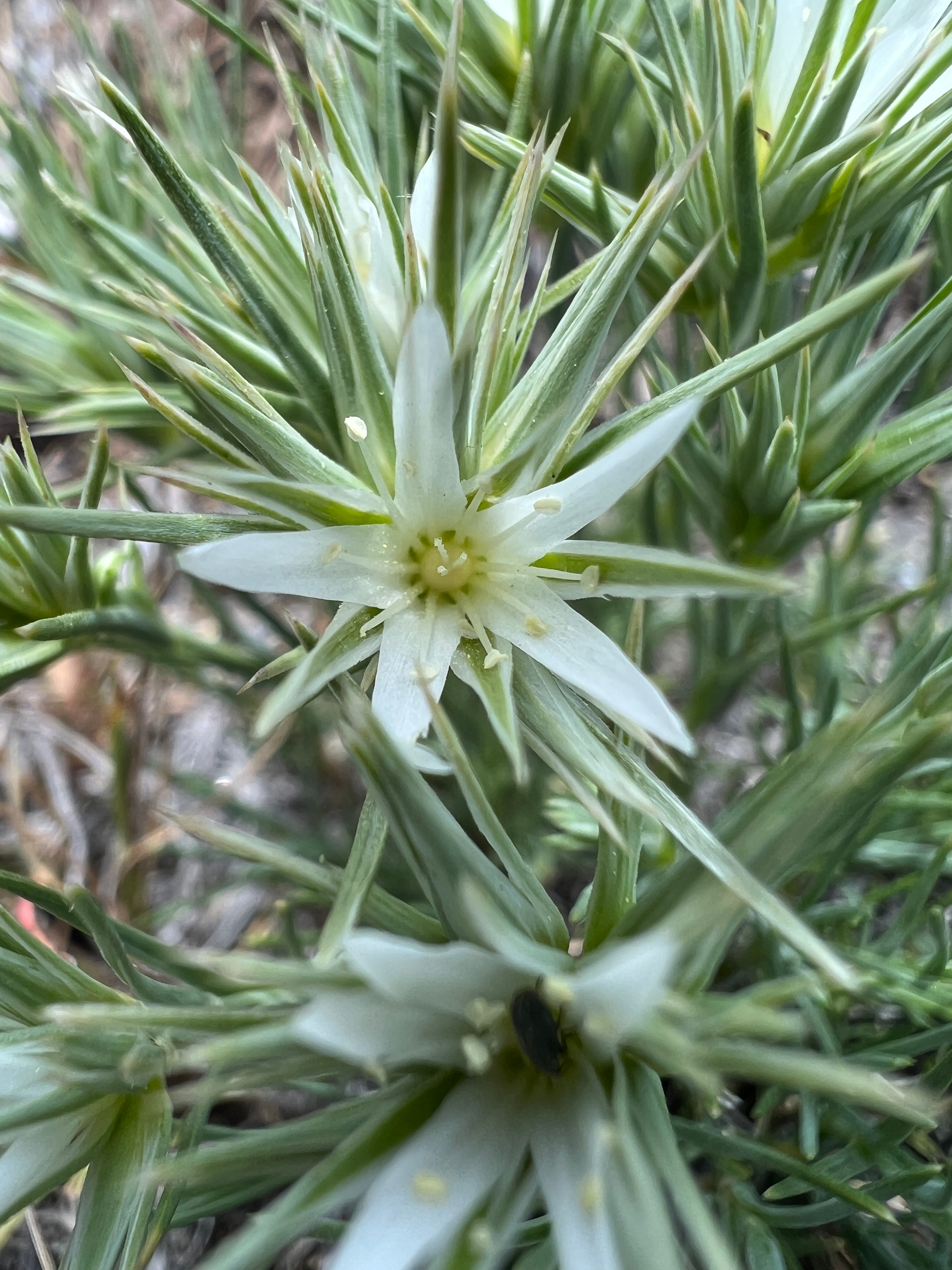
Flower

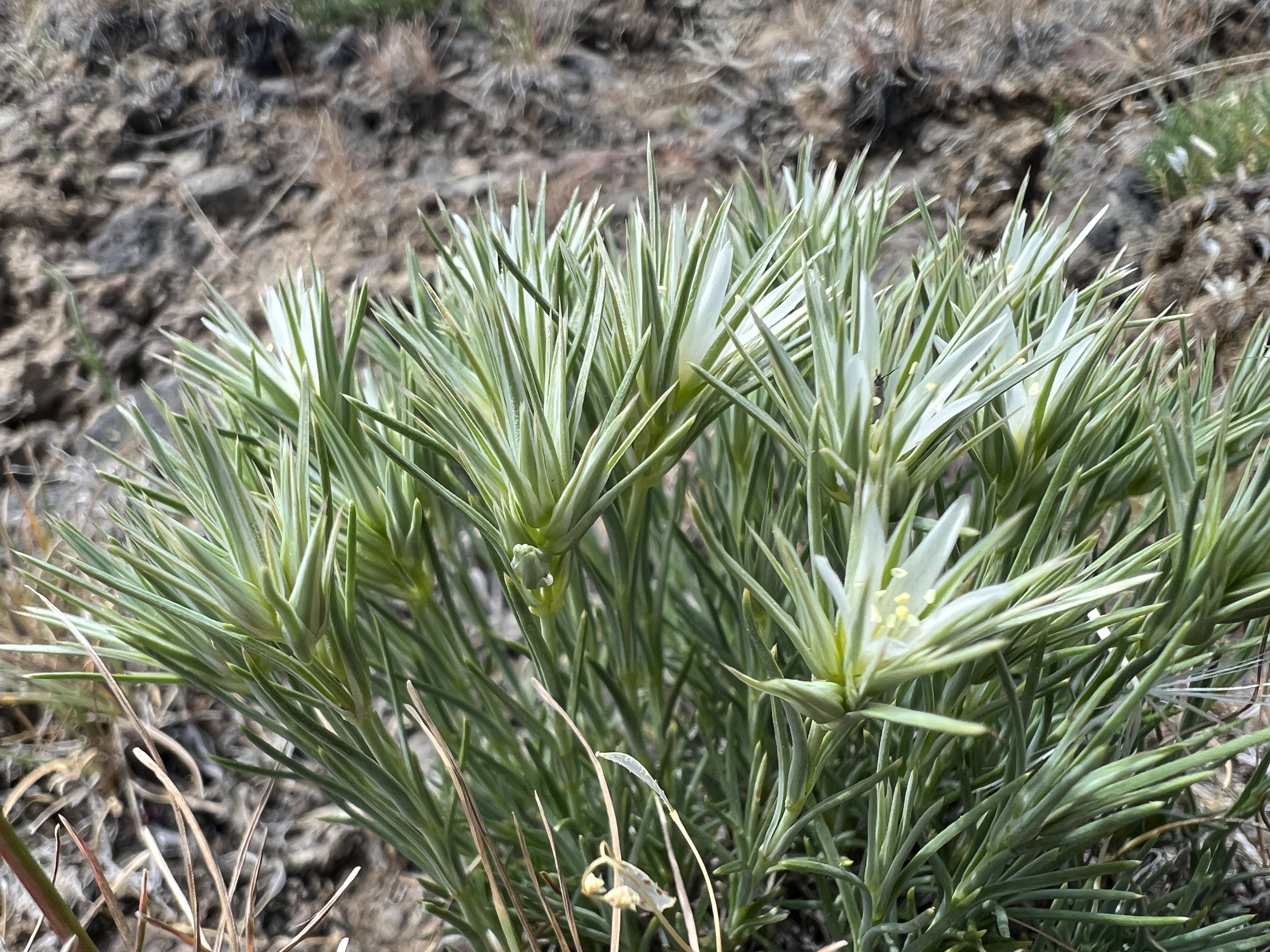
Side view
