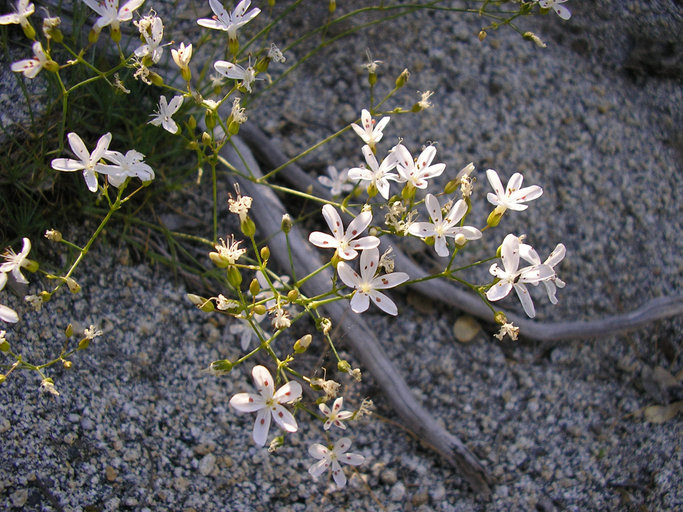

Scientific classification
- Kingdom: Plantae
- Clade: Embryophytes
- Clade: Tracheophytes
- Clade: Angiosperms
- Clade: Eudicots
- Order: Caryophyllales
- Family: Caryophyllaceae
- Genus: Eremogone
- Species: E. cliftonii

Binomial name
- Eremogone cliftonii Rabeler & R.L.Hartm.

= Eremogone cliftonii =

Species of flowering plant

Eremogone cliftoniii is a species of flowering plant in the family Caryophyllaceae known by the common name Clifton's eremogone. It is endemic to California, where it is known from 27 to 33 occurrences in Butte and Plumas Counties. It occurs in forests and chaparral habitat on weathered granite soils. Although limited in distribution it may be relatively abundant where it does occur. The plant was only described to science in 2007.

This is a perennial herb with small, threadlike, pointed leaves up to 6 centimeters long. The terminal inflorescence is a cluster of flowers with petals 1 to 2 centimeters long.
