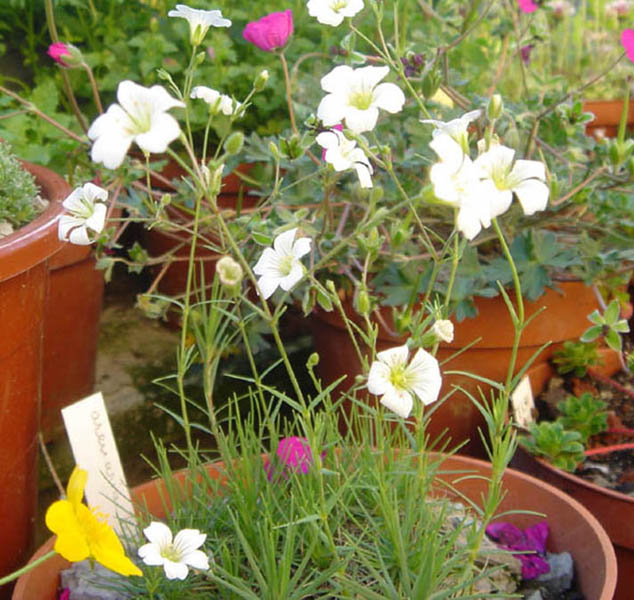
- Eremogone ledebouriana here given as Arenaria ledebouriana

Scientific classification
- Kingdom: Plantae
- Clade: Tracheophytes
- Clade: Angiosperms
- Clade: Eudicots
- Clade: Superasterids
- Order: Caryophyllales
- Family: Caryophyllaceae
- Genus: Eremogone; Fenzl

Species
- See text

= Eremogone =

Genus of plants in the carnation family

Eremogone is a genus of flowering plants in the family Caryophyllaceae, native to western North America, northern Asia, eastern Europe and northeastern Africa. Attempts to resolve taxonomic relationships within the Caryophyllaceae have resulted in the enlargement of Eremogone with species from other genera.

== Species ==
Currently accepted species include:

- Eremogone aberrans (M.E.Jones) Ikonn.
- Eremogone acerosa (Boiss.) Ikonn.
- Eremogone acicularis (F.N.Williams) Ikonn.
- Eremogone aculeata (S.Watson) Ikonn.
- Eremogone acutisepala (Hausskn. ex F.N.Williams) Ikonn.
- Eremogone aksayqingensis (L.H.Zhou) Rabeler & W.L.Wagner
- Eremogone ali-gulii Koç & Hamzaoglu
- Eremogone androsacea (Grubov) Ikonn.
- Eremogone angustisepala (McNeill) Ikonn.
- Eremogone armeniaca (Boiss.) Holub
- Eremogone asiatica (Schischk.) Ikonn.
- Eremogone baxoiensis (L.H.Zhou) Dillenb. & Kadereit
- Eremogone biebersteinii (D.F.K.Schltdl.) Holub
- Eremogone blepharophylla (Boiss.) Ikonn.
- Eremogone brachypetala (Grossh.) Czerep.
- Eremogone brevipetala (Tsui & L.H.Zhou) Sadeghian & Zarre
- Eremogone bryophylla (Fernald) Pusalkar & D.K.Singh
- Eremogone calcicola (Gilli) Ikonn.
- Eremogone capillaris (Poir.) Fenzl
- Eremogone caricifolia (Boiss.) Ikonn.
- Eremogone cephalotes (M.Bieb.) Fenzl
- Eremogone cliftonii Rabeler & R.L.Hartm.
- Eremogone commagenae (Çeleb. & Favarger) Rabeler & W.L.Wagner
- Eremogone congesta (Nutt. ex Torr. & A.Gray) Ikonn.
- Eremogone cucubaloides (Sm.) Hohen.
- Eremogone curvifolia (Majumdar) Pusalkar & D.K.Singh
- Eremogone davisii (McNeill) Holub
- Eremogone dianthoides (Sm.) Ikonn.
- Eremogone drypidea (Boiss.) Ikonn.
- Eremogone eastwoodiae (Rydb.) Ikonn.
- Eremogone edgeworthiana (Majumdar) Pusalkar & D.K.Singh
- Eremogone fendleri (A.Gray) Ikonn.
- Eremogone ferganica (Schischk.) Ikonn.
- Eremogone ferrisiae (Abrams) R.L.Hartm. & Rabeler
- Eremogone ferruginea (Duthie ex F.N.Williams) Pusalkar & D.K.Singh
- Eremogone festucoides (Benth.) Pusalkar & D.K.Singh
- Eremogone formosa (Fisch. ex Ser.) Fenzl
- Eremogone franklinii (Douglas ex Hook.) R.L.Hartm. & Rabeler
- Eremogone gerzensis (L.H.Zhou) Rabeler & W.L.Wagner
- Eremogone glaucescens (H.J.P.Winkl.) Ikonn.
- Eremogone globuliflora (Rech.f.) Ikonn.
- Eremogone graminea (C.A.Mey.) C.A.Mey.
- Eremogone griffithii (Boiss.) Ikonn.
- Eremogone grueningiana (Pax & K.Hoffm.) Rabeler & W.L.Wagner
- Eremogone gypsophiloides (L.) Fenzl
- Eremogone haitzeshanensis (Tsui ex L.H.Zhou) Rabeler & W.L.Wagner
- Eremogone holostea (M.Bieb.) Rupr.
- Eremogone hookeri (Nutt.) W.A.Weber
- Eremogone ikonnikovii Knjaz.
- Eremogone insignis (Litv.) Ikonn.
- Eremogone isaurica (Boiss.) Ikonn.
- Eremogone ischnophylla (F.N.Williams) Rabeler & W.L.Wagner
- Eremogone jakutorum (A.P.Khokhr.) N.S.Pavlova
- Eremogone juncea (M.Bieb.) Fenzl
- Eremogone kansuensis (Maxim.) Dillenb. & Kadereit
- Eremogone kingii (S.Watson) Ikonn.
- Eremogone koelzii (Rech.f.) Ikonn.
- Eremogone kumaonensis (Maxim.) Pusalkar & D.K.Singh
- Eremogone lancangensis (L.H.Zhou) Rabeler & W.L.Wagner
- Eremogone ledebouriana (Fenzl) Ikonn.
- Eremogone loisiae N.H.Holmgren & P.K.Holmgren
- Eremogone longifolia (M.Bieb.) Fenzl
- Eremogone lychnidea (M.Bieb.) Rupr.
- Eremogone macradenia (S.Watson) Ikonn.
- Eremogone macrantha (Schischk.) Ikonn.
- Eremogone meyeri (Fenzl) Ikonn.
- Eremogone minuartioides Dillenb. & Kadereit
- Eremogone mongholica (Schischk.) Ikonn.
- Eremogone mukerjeeana (Majumdar) Rabeler & W.L.Wagner
- Eremogone multiflora (Gilli) Ikonn.
- Eremogone oosepala (Bordz.) Czerep.
- Eremogone paulsenii (H.J.P.Winkl.) Ikonn.
- Eremogone persica (Boiss.) Ikonn.
- Eremogone picta (Sm.) Dillenb. & Kadereit
- Eremogone polaris (Schischk.) Ikonn.
- Eremogone polycnemifolia (Boiss.) Holub
- Eremogone potaninii (Schischk.) Rabeler & W.L.Wagner
- Eremogone procera (Spreng.) Rchb.
- Eremogone przewalskii (Maxim.) Ikonn.
- Eremogone pseudacantholimon (Bornm.) Holub
- Eremogone pulvinata (Edgew.) Pusalkar & D.K.Singh
- Eremogone pumicola (Coville & Leiberg) Ikonn.
- Eremogone qinghaiensis (Tsui & L.H.Zhou) Rabeler & W.L.Wagner
- Eremogone rigida (M.Bieb.) Fenzl
- Eremogone roborowskii (Maxim.) Rabeler & W.L.Wagner
- Eremogone saxatilis (L.) Ikonn.
- Eremogone scariosa (Boiss.) Holub
- Eremogone shannanensis (L.H.Zhou) Rabeler & W.L.Wagner
- Eremogone sinaica (Boiss.) Dillenb. & Kadereit
- Eremogone stenomeres (Eastw.) Ikonn.
- Eremogone surculosa (Rech.f.) Ikonn.
- Eremogone szowitsii (Boiss.) Ikonn.
- Eremogone taibaishanensis (L.H.Zhou) Rabeler & W.L.Wagner
- Eremogone talassica (Adylov) Czerep.
- Eremogone tetrasticha (Boiss.) Ikonn.
- Eremogone tschuktschorum (Regel) Ikonn.
- Eremogone turlanica (Bajtenov) Czerep.
- Eremogone ursina (Rob.) Ikonn.
- Eremogone zadoiensis (L.H.Zhou) Rabeler & W.L.Wagner
- Eremogone zargariana (Parsa) Holub
