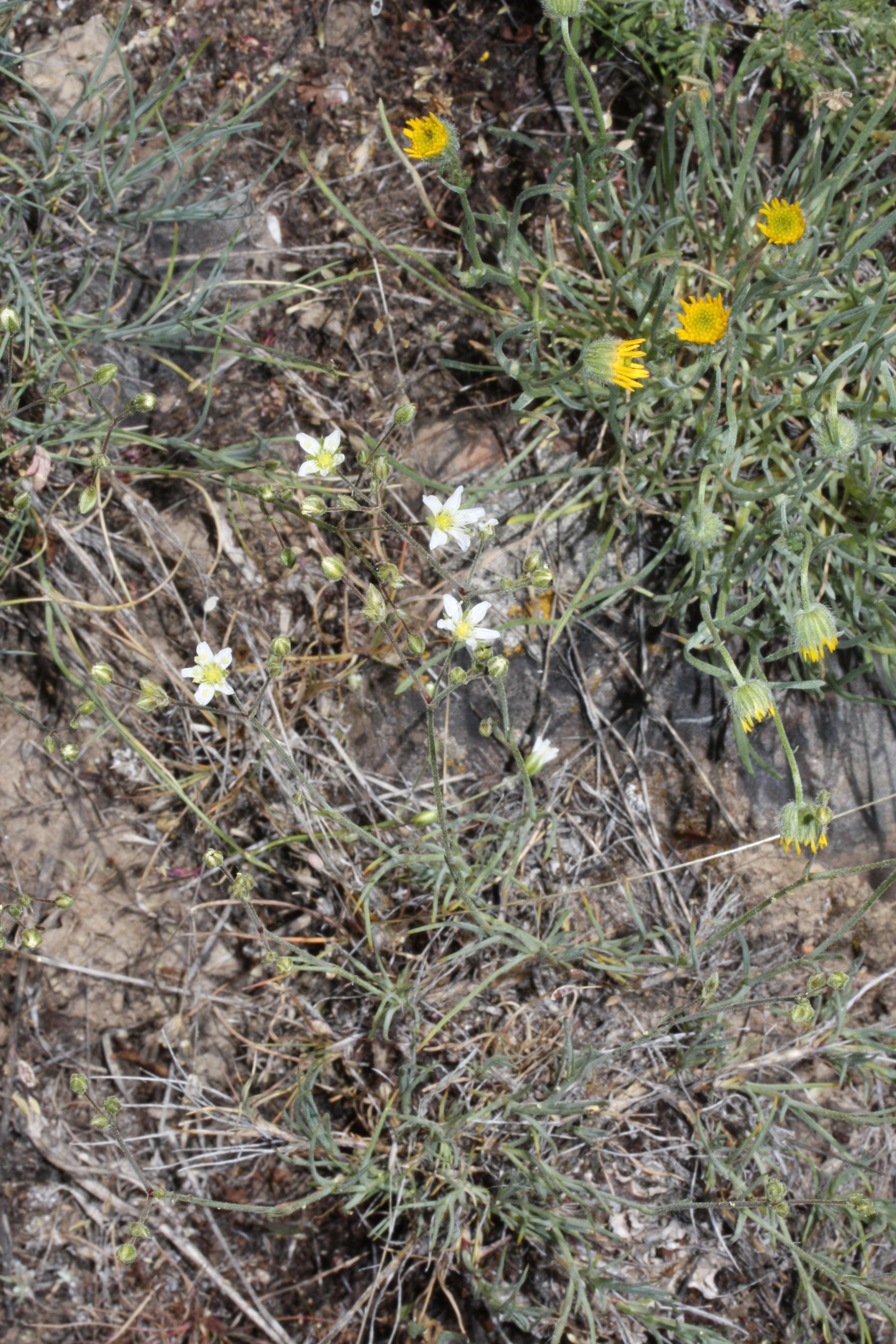
- Arenaria congesta in Wenas Wildlife Area

Conservation status
- Secure (NatureServe)

Scientific classification
- Kingdom: Plantae
- Clade: Tracheophytes
- Clade: Angiosperms
- Clade: Eudicots
- Order: Caryophyllales
- Family: Caryophyllaceae
- Genus: Eremogone
- Species: E. congesta

Binomial name
- Eremogone congesta (Nutt. ex Torr. & A.Gray) Ikonn.

Synonyms
- Arenaria congesta Nutt. ex Torr. & A.Gray

= Eremogone congesta =

Species of flowering plants

Eremogone congesta is a species of flowering plant in the family Caryophyllaceae known by the common name ballhead sandwort. It is native to western North America from central Canada to the American southwest.

== Description ==
This is a perennial herb forming a tuft of slender upright stems up to about 40 centimeters (16 in) tall. The leaves are needlelike to thready, up to 8 centimeters (3.1 in) long and only a few millimeters wide. They may be fleshy or flat and they often have a very sharp tip. Most of the leaves are located in a patch at the base of the plant, and there are a few scattered along the mostly naked stem.

The inflorescence is an open or rounded cyme of five-petalled white flowers. The fruit is a toothed capsule containing several reddish seeds.

== Uses ==
The plant was used for a variety of medicinal purposes by Native American groups, including the Shoshone.
