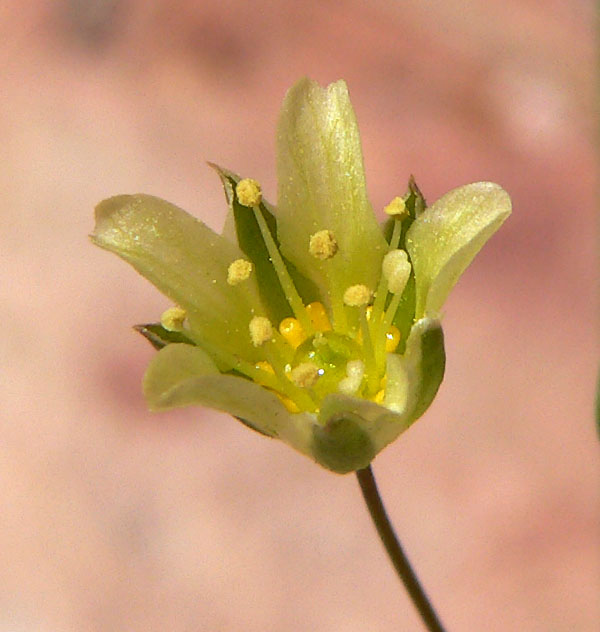

Scientific classification
- Kingdom: Plantae
- Clade: Tracheophytes
- Clade: Angiosperms
- Clade: Eudicots
- Order: Caryophyllales
- Family: Caryophyllaceae
- Genus: Eremogone
- Species: E. macradenia

Binomial name
- Eremogone macradenia (S.Wats.) Ikonn.

Synonyms
- Arenaria congesta var. macradenia (S.Wats.) M.E.Jones; Arenaria macradenia S.Wats.

= Eremogone macradenia =

Species of flowering plant

Eremogone macradenia is a species of flowering plant in the family Caryophyllaceae known by the common names Mojave sandwort and desert sandwort.

== Distribution ==
It is native to the Southwestern United States, where it grows on desert slopes and in dry woodland and sagebrush, such as in the Mojave Desert in California.

== Description ==
This is a perennial herb producing a tuft of erect stems 20 to 40 centimeters tall. The leaves are needlelike, a few centimeters long and sharp or blunt at the tip. The inflorescence is an open cyme of white flowers each with five petals. The fruit is a toothed capsule containing several small reddish to black seeds.

=== Varieties ===
There are four varieties of this species. Three are not rare but one variety, var. kuschei, is limited to about 130 individuals in the San Gabriel Mountains of eastern Los Angeles County, California.
