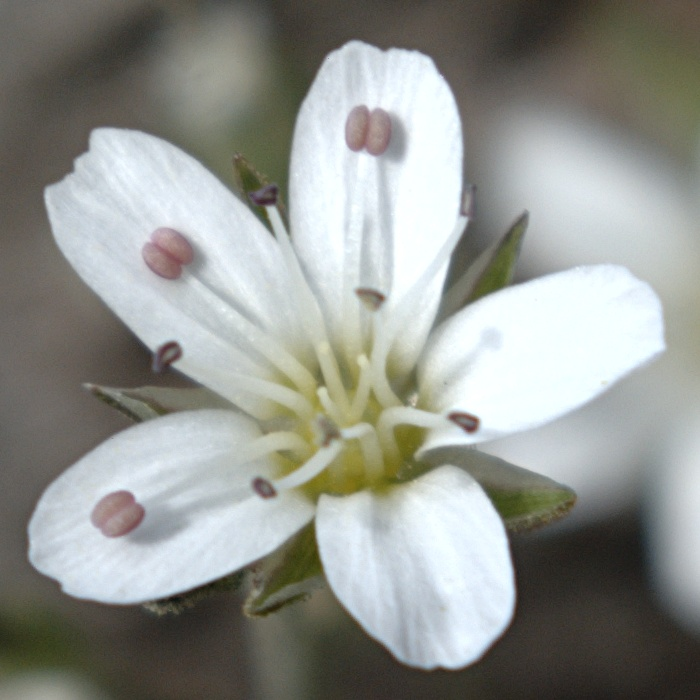
- Eremogone fendleri flower

Scientific classification
- Kingdom: Plantae
- Clade: Tracheophytes
- Clade: Angiosperms
- Clade: Eudicots
- Order: Caryophyllales
- Family: Caryophyllaceae
- Genus: Eremogone
- Species: E. fendleri

Binomial name
- Eremogone fendleri (A.Gray) Ikonn.

Synonyms
- Arenaria fendleri A.Gray; Arenaria fendleri subsp. genuina Maguire

= Eremogone fendleri =

Species of flowering plant in the carnation family

Eremogone fendleri, or Fendler's sandwort, is a perennial plant in the family Caryophyllaceae found in the Colorado Plateau and Canyonlands region of the southwestern United States.
