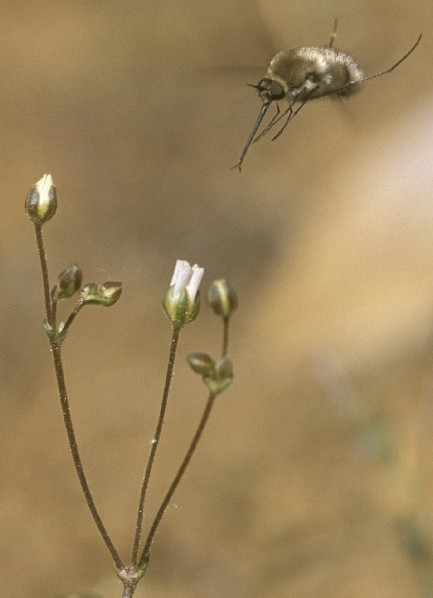
- With a bee fly

Conservation status
- Critically Imperiled (NatureServe)

Scientific classification
- Kingdom: Plantae
- Clade: Embryophytes
- Clade: Tracheophytes
- Clade: Angiosperms
- Clade: Eudicots
- Order: Caryophyllales
- Family: Caryophyllaceae
- Genus: Eremogone
- Species: E. ursina

Binomial name
- Eremogone ursina (B.L.Rob.) Ikonn.

Synonyms
- Arenaria capillaris var. ursina (B.L.Rob.) B.L.Rob.; Arenaria ursina B.L.Rob.

= Eremogone ursina =

Species of flowering plant

Eremogone ursina is a species of flowering plant in the family Caryophyllaceae known by the common name Bear Valley sandwort.

== Distribution ==
It is endemic to San Bernardino County, California, where it is known from a few occurrences in the vicinity of Big Bear. It grows on quartzite pebble plain habitat in forest openings in the San Bernardino Mountains near the communities of Fawnskin, Sugarloaf, and Baldwin Lake. It is an indicator species for the rare pebble plain habitat, which is unique to the area. It is a federally listed threatened species.

== Description ==
Eremogone ursina is a petite perennial herb forming small tufts no more than 18 centimeters tall. Its small, waxy leaves are needlelike and up to a centimeter long. The inflorescence is an open cyme of white flowers with five petals each under half a centimeter long and protruding purple-anthered stamens. The fruit is a toothed capsule containing 1 or 2 minute purple seeds.

== Threats ==
The biggest threat to the survival of this species is off-roading. Other threats include destruction of its habitat for development, mining activity, and disturbance of the landscape during fire suppression efforts.
