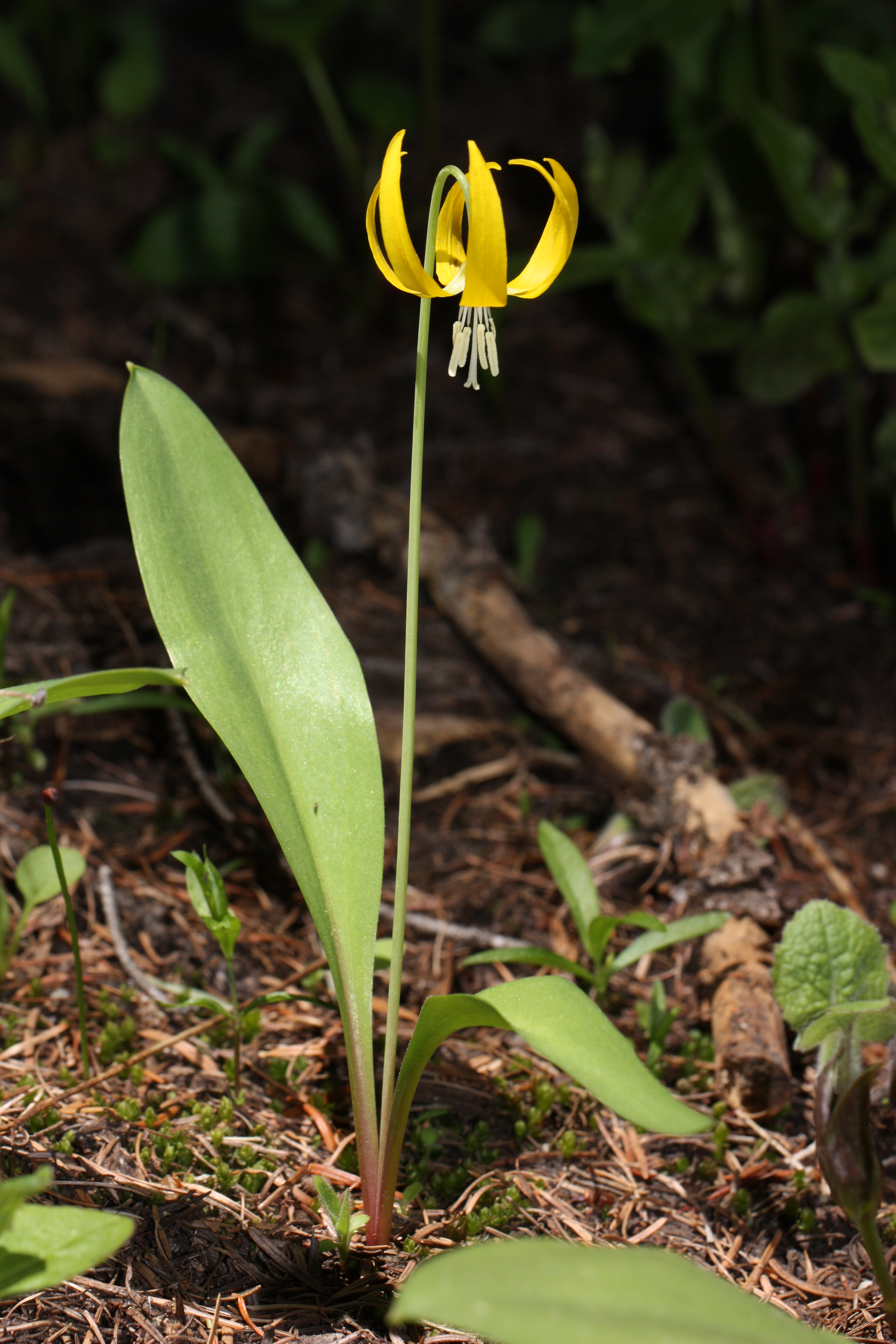
- In Mount Rainier National Park

Conservation status
- Secure (NatureServe)

Scientific classification
- Kingdom: Plantae
- Clade: Tracheophytes
- Clade: Angiosperms
- Clade: Monocots
- Order: Liliales
- Family: Liliaceae
- Subfamily: Lilioideae
- Tribe: Lilieae
- Genus: Erythronium
- Species: E. grandiflorum

Binomial name
- Erythronium grandiflorum Pursh

Synonyms
- List: Erythronium giganteum Lindl.; Erythronium leptopetalum Rydb.; Erythronium maximum Douglas ex Baker; Erythronium nudipetalum Applegate; Erythronium obtusatum Goodd.; Erythronium pallidum (H.St.John) G.N.Jones; Erythronium parviflorum (S.Watson) Goodd.; Erythronium speciosum Nutt. ex Baker; Erythronium utahense Rydb.

= Erythronium grandiflorum =

Plant species in the lily family

Erythronium grandiflorum is a North American species of plants in the lily family. It is known by several common names, including yellow avalanche lily, glacier lily, and dogtooth fawn lily. The Ktunaxa name for glacier lily is maxa.

== Description ==
Erythronium grandiflorum grows from a deep bulb (or corm) which is 3 to 5 centimeters wide. Its two green leaves are wavy-edged and up to 20 centimeters long. The stalk may reach 30 centimeters tall and bears one to three showy flowers. Each flower has bright lemon yellow petals, white stamens with large white to yellow to red anthers, and a white style.

== Taxonomy ==
Erythronium grandiflorum is classified in genus Erythronium in the family Liliaceae. It has no subspecies or varieties according to Plants of the World Online (POWO). The subspecies Erythronium grandiflorum subsp. candidum, though found in Flora of North America, is considered to be a species named Erythronium idahoense.

== Distribution and habitat ==
It is native to western North America from British Columbia and Alberta south to New Mexico and California, though it has not been reported from Arizona or Nevada. It can be found in subalpine mountain meadows, slopes, and clearings.

== Ecology ==
The flower is pollinated by bumblebees and other bees. The bulbs are an important and preferred food of the grizzly bear. Mule deer readily eat the foliage.

After hummingbirds migrate 1,500 miles each year from Mexico to the Rocky Mountains of Colorado they collect energy from the nectar of the lilies, however, rising temperatures from global warming cause the flowers to bloom, and also to wither, earlier each year. As of 2023, the danger is foreseen that in 20 years the birds may arrive from their long migration to find their usually reliable nourishment unavailable because of premature withering.

== Uses ==
The bulbs were traditionally an important food source for a number of western North American Indigenous Nations. They were harvested when the plants were in fruit and often pit cooked, then dried and stored. They can also be boiled.

== Gallery ==
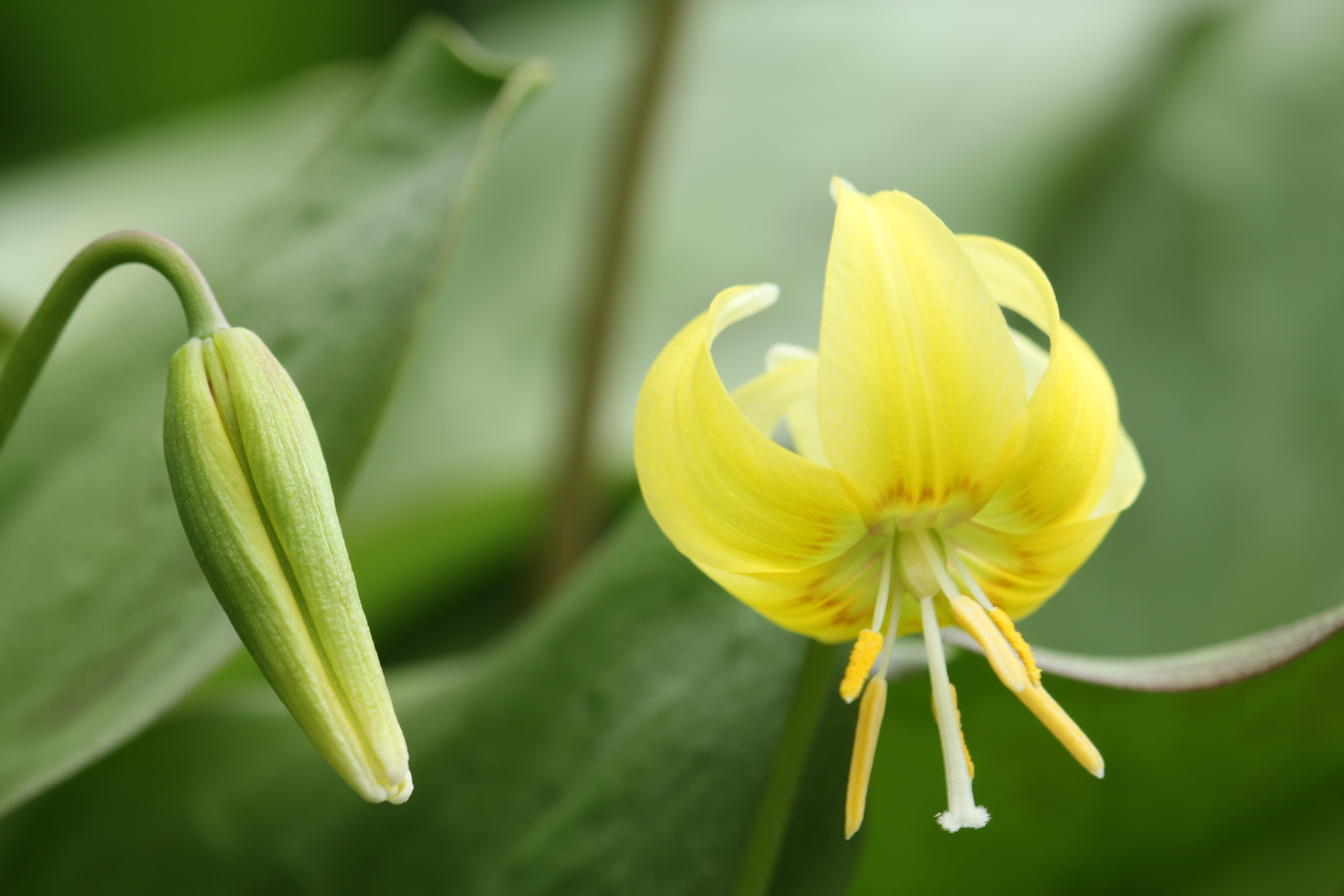
Bud and flower

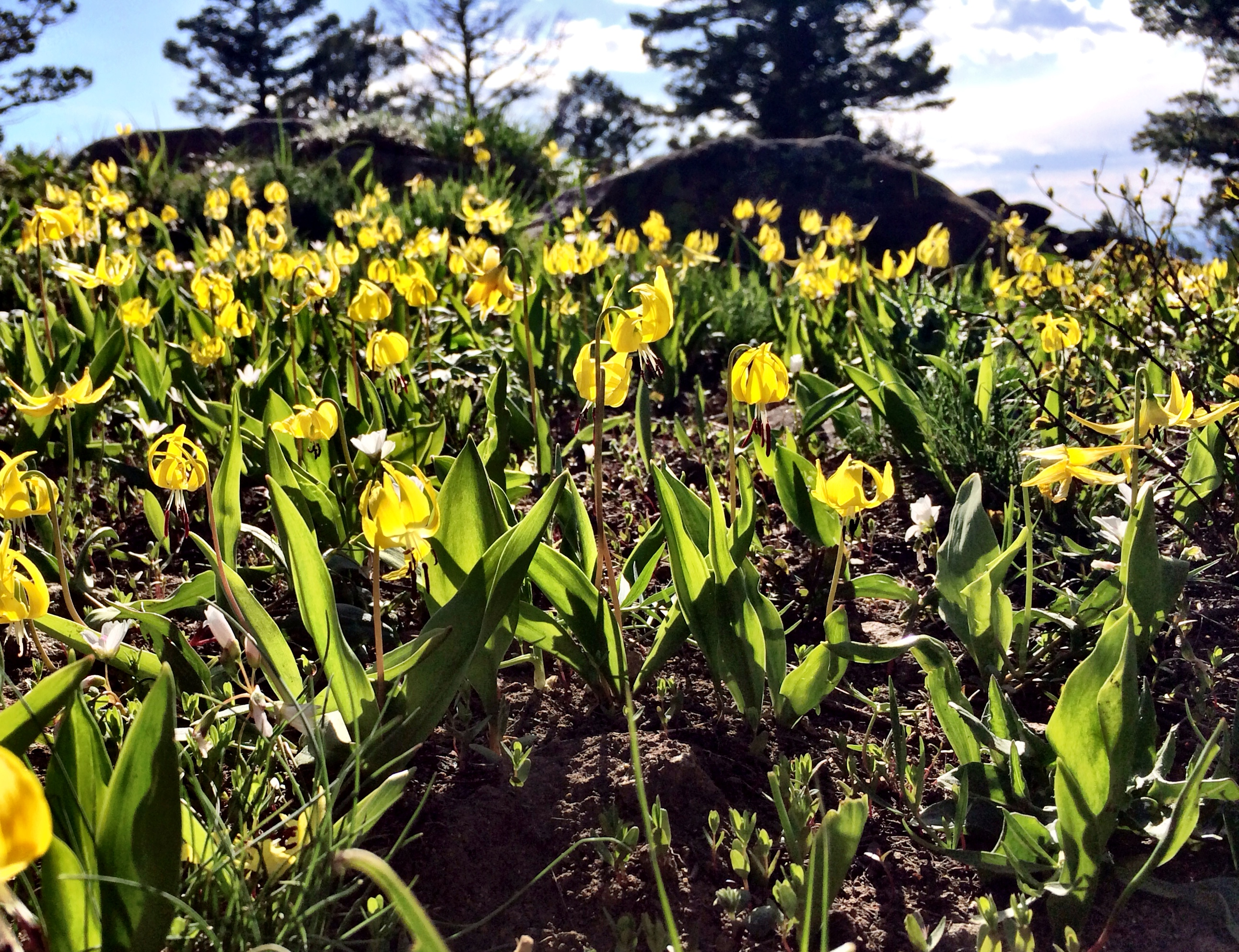
Blooms in Missoula, Montana

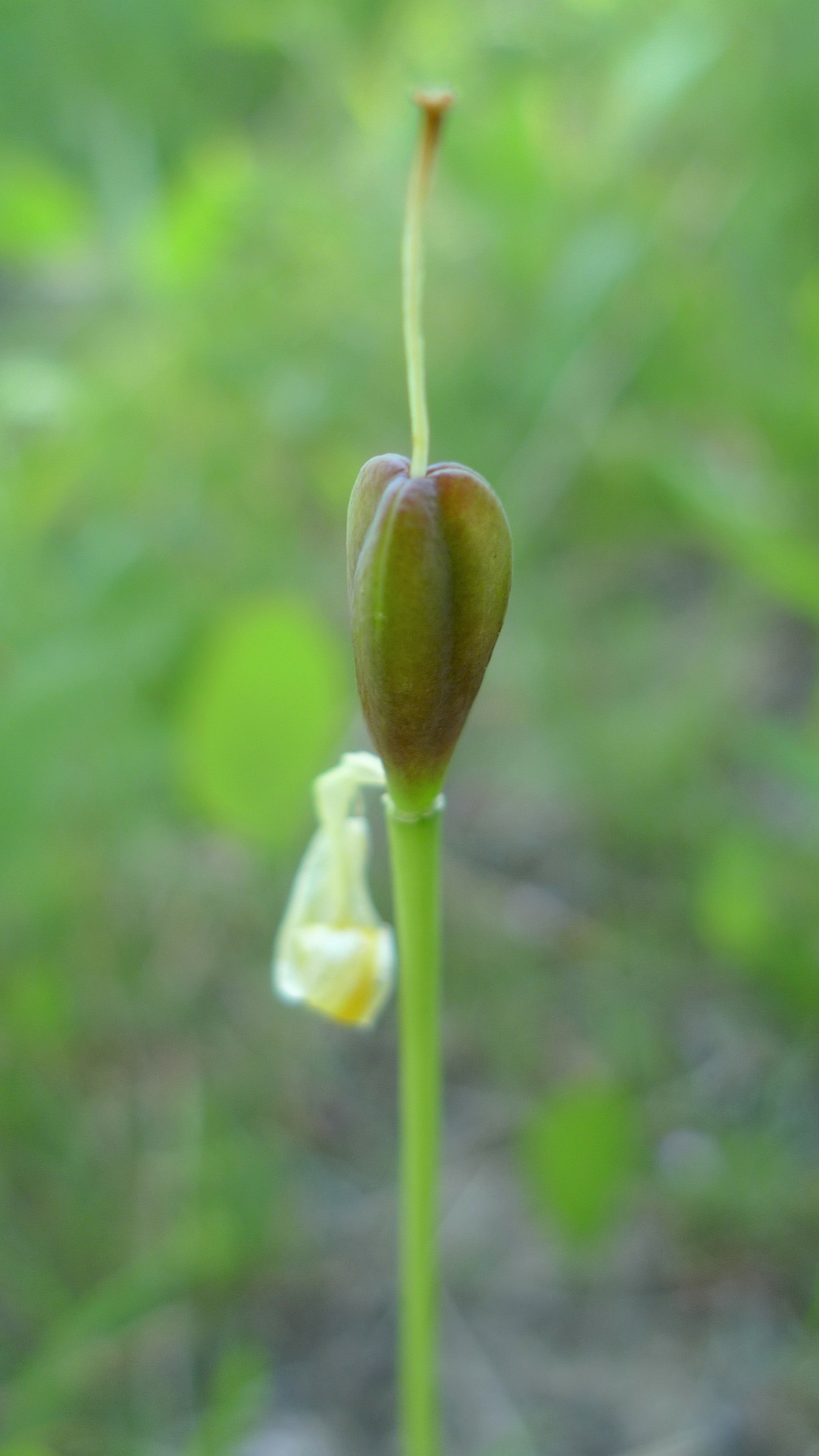
Young fruit
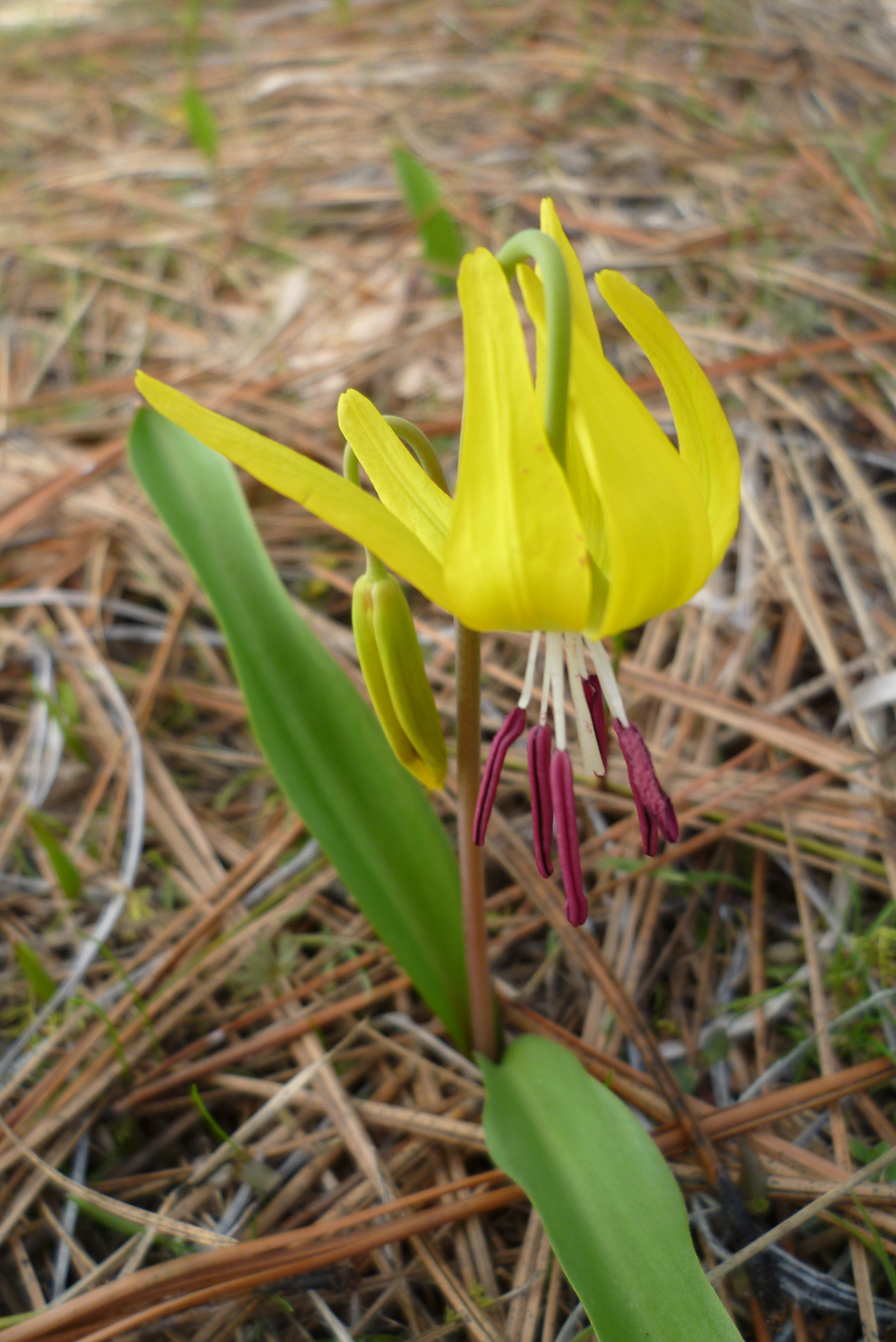
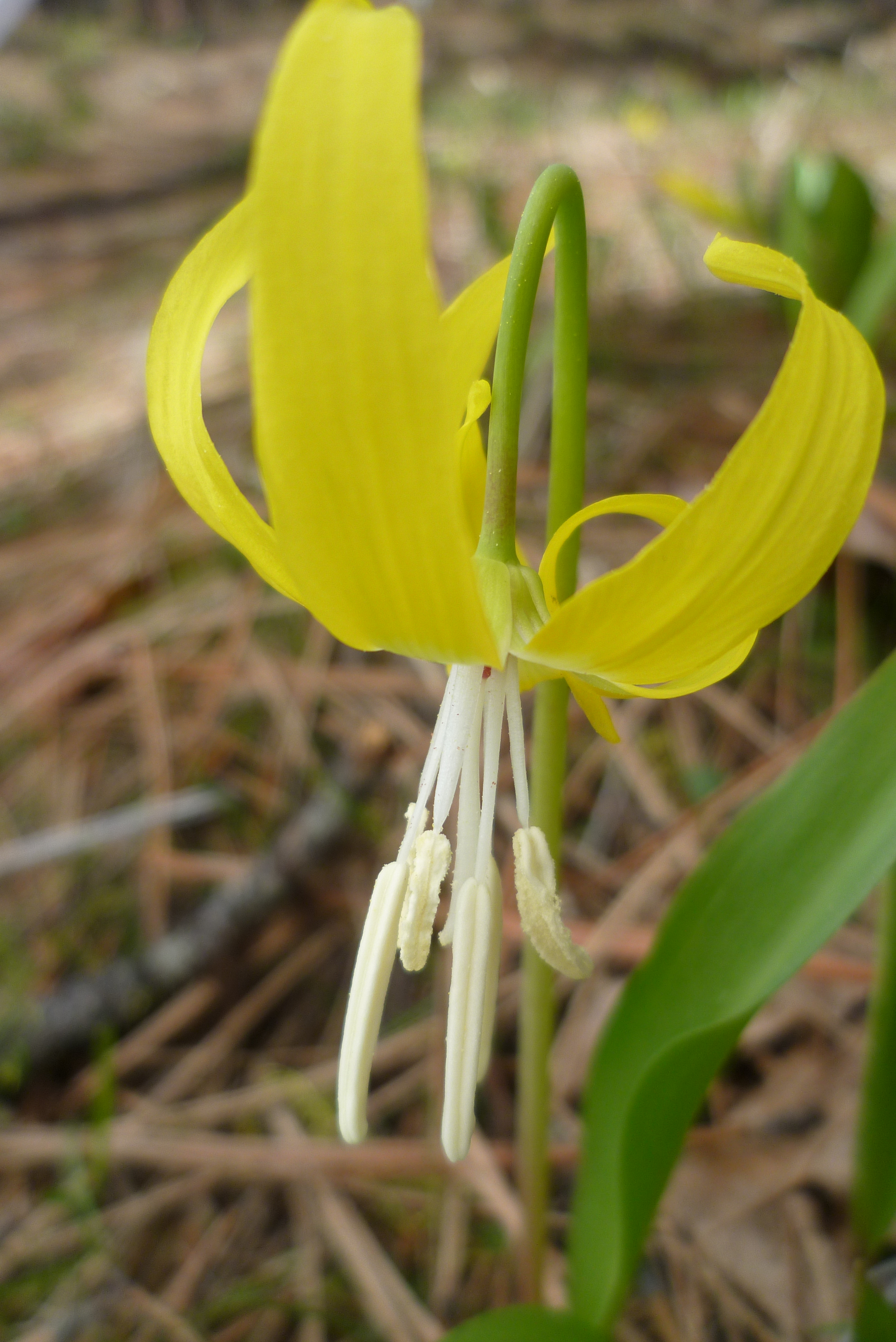
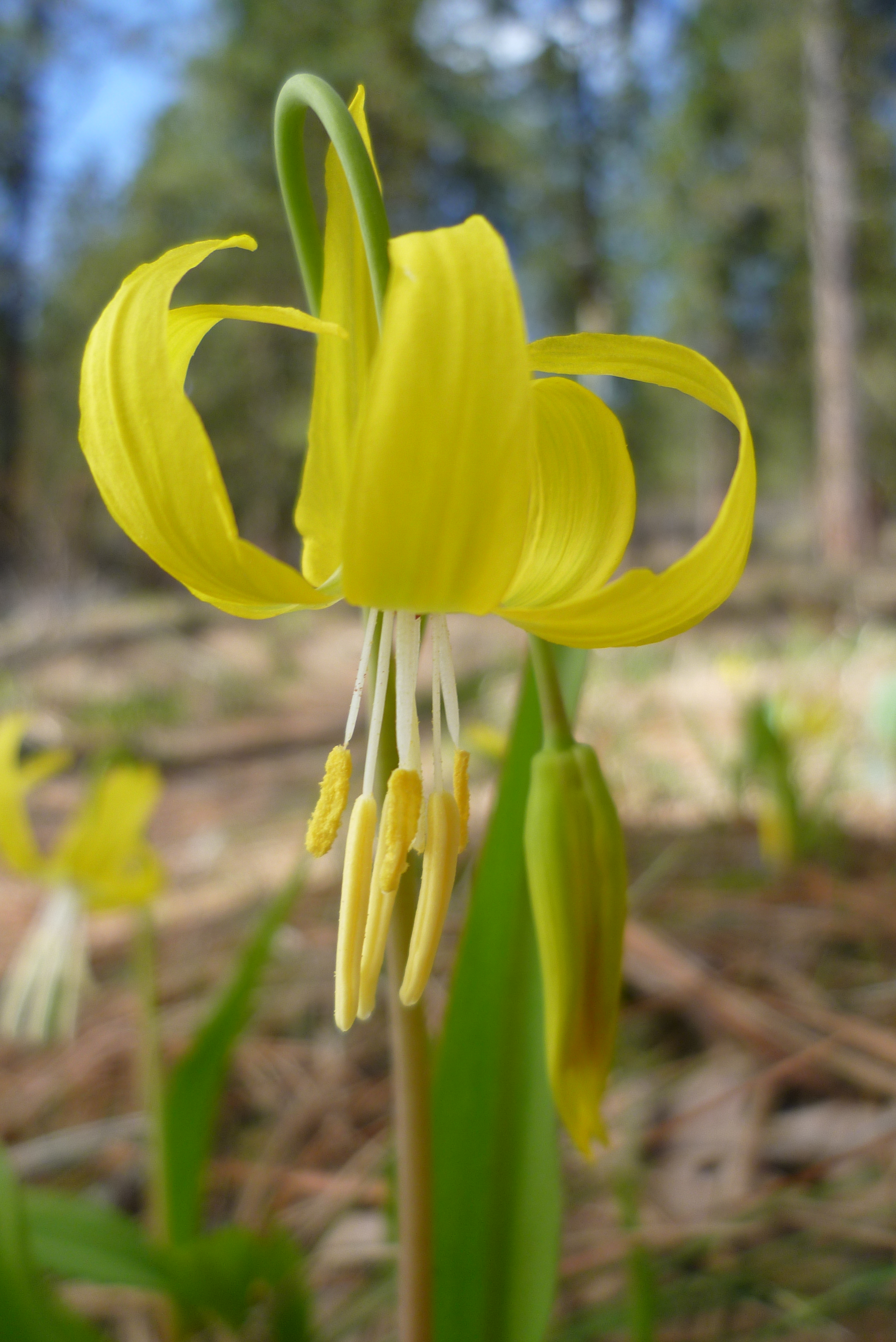
Anther color variation
