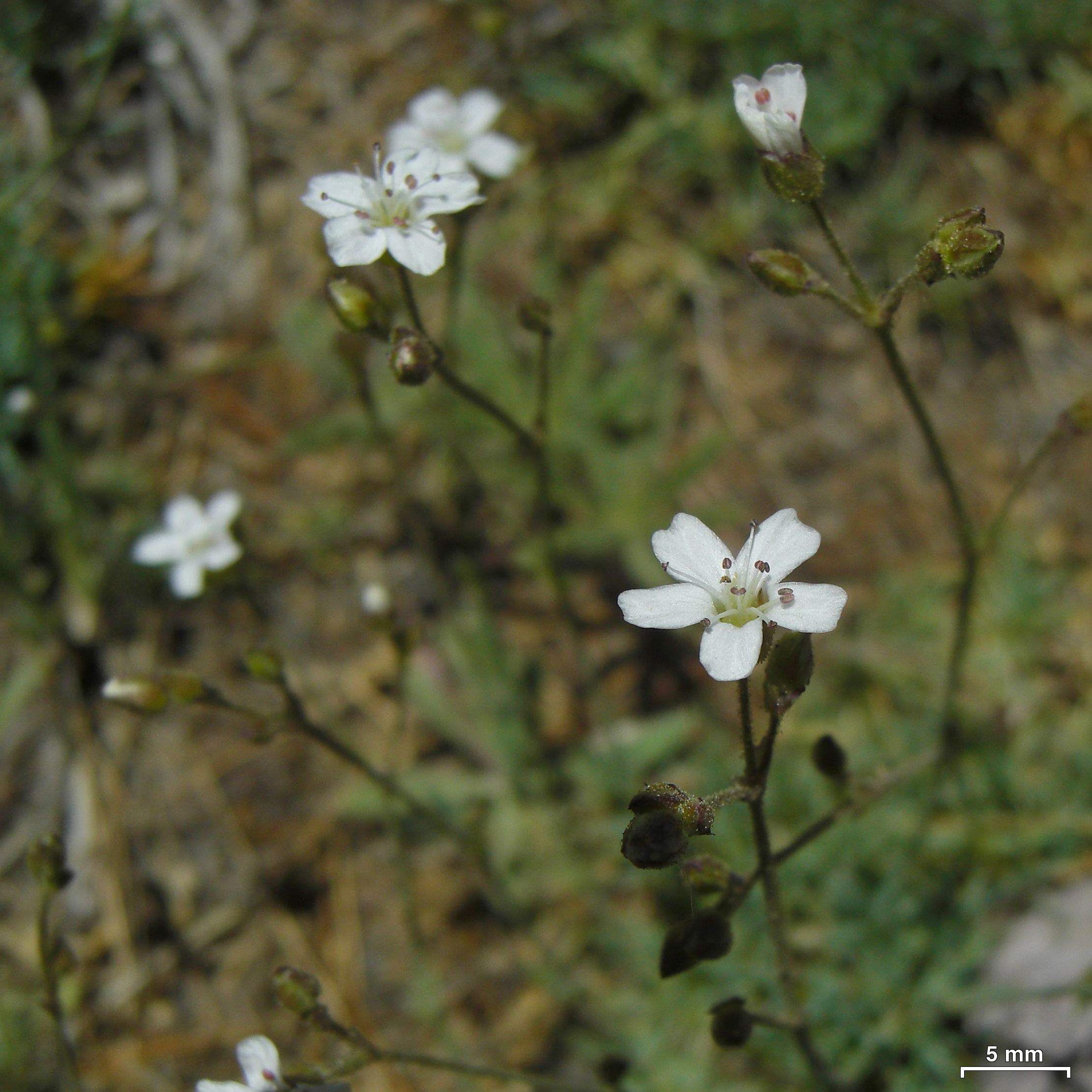

Scientific classification
- Kingdom: Plantae
- Clade: Tracheophytes
- Clade: Angiosperms
- Clade: Eudicots
- Order: Caryophyllales
- Family: Caryophyllaceae
- Genus: Eremogone
- Species: E. aculeata

Binomial name
- Eremogone aculeata (S.Wats.) Ikonn.

Synonyms
- Arenaria aculeata S.Watson; Arenaria congesta var. aculeata (S.Watson) M.E.Jones; Arenaria fendleri var. aculeata (S.Watson) S.L.Welsh; Arenaria pumicola var. californica Maguire; Arenaria salmonensis L.F.Hend.

= Eremogone aculeata =

Species of flowering plant in the carnation family

Eremogone aculeata (syn. Arenaria aculeata) is a species of flowering plant in the family Caryophyllaceae known by the common name prickly sandwort. It is native to the western United States, where it grows in the southern sagebrush steppe, mountainous areas, and volcanic soils, as well as on rocky slopes.

This is a mat-forming perennial herb growing in clumps of waxy foliage on short, hairy, glandular stems. The leaves are very thin and pointed, somewhat needlelike, and up to 3 or 4 centimeters long. The inflorescence is an open array of flowers with five lance-shaped to oval white petals each one half to one centimeter long. The fruit is a toothed capsule containing several small yellowish seeds.
