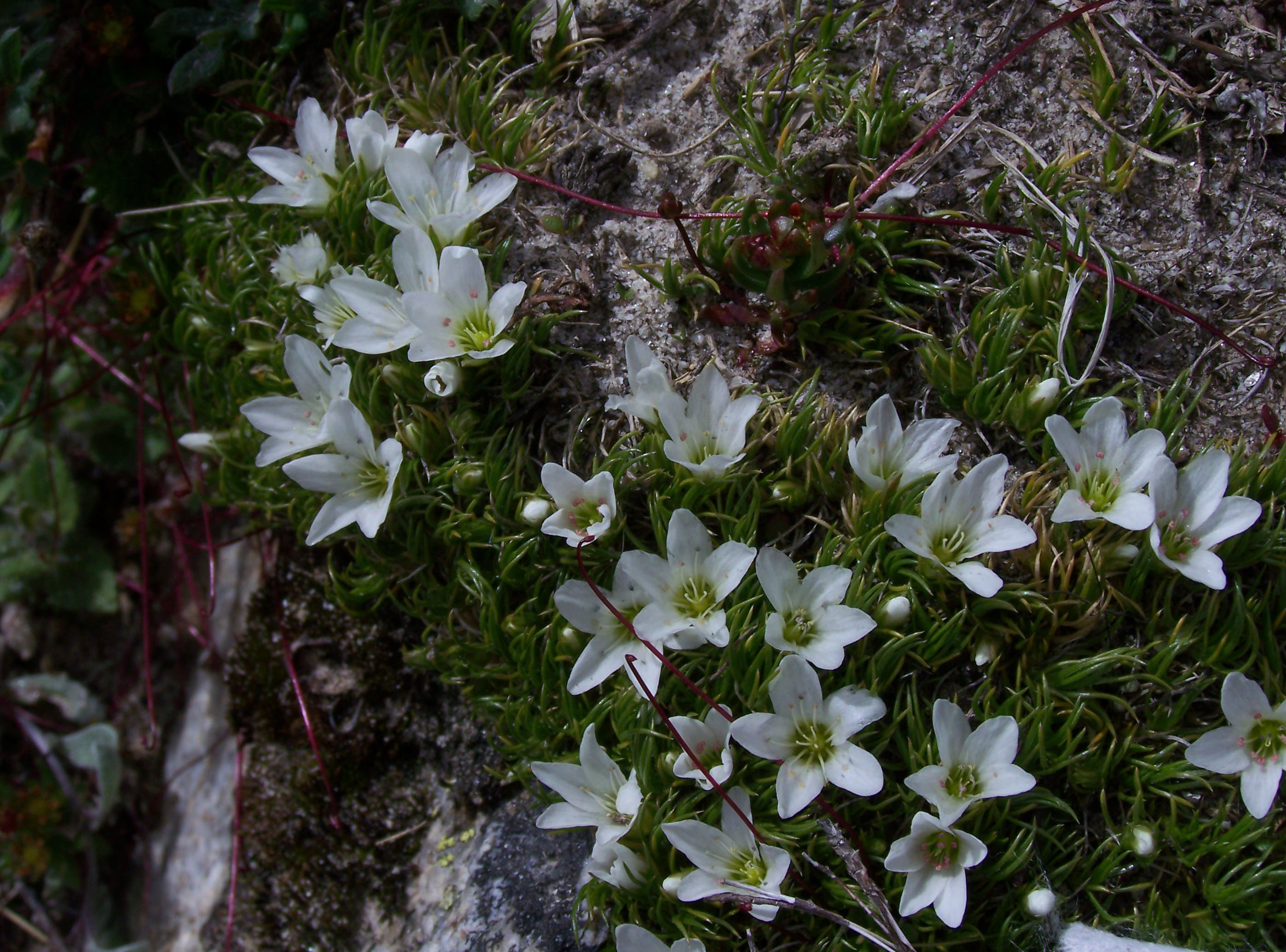

Scientific classification
- Kingdom: Plantae
- Clade: Embryophytes
- Clade: Tracheophytes
- Clade: Angiosperms
- Clade: Eudicots
- Order: Caryophyllales
- Family: Caryophyllaceae
- Genus: Eremogone
- Species: E. bryophylla

Binomial name
- Eremogone bryophylla (Fernald) Pusalkar & D.K.Singh

Synonyms
- Arenaria bryophylla Fernald; Arenaria bryophylla var. brevipedicella R.F.Huang & S.K.Wu; Arenaria musciformis Wall. ex Edgew. & Hook.f.

= Eremogone bryophylla =

Species of flowering plant in the carnation family

Eremogone bryophylla is a flowering plant in the sandwort (Eremogone) genus. It occurs in the Himalaya of China, Tibet, Nepal, and India. It is the highest known flowering plant, occurring as high as 6,180 metres (20,280 ft).
